= Deaths in February 2018 =

The following is a list of notable deaths in February 2018.

Entries for each day are listed alphabetically by surname. A typical entry lists information in the following sequence:

- Name, age, country of citizenship at birth, subsequent country of citizenship (if applicable), reason for notability, cause of death (if known), and reference.

== February 2018 ==
=== 1 ===
- Reyes Abades, 68, Spanish special effects artist (Pan's Labyrinth, The Skin I Live In, Goya's Ghosts), heart attack.
- Omar Aggad, 90, Palestinian-born Saudi Arabian investor and philanthropist.
- Haji Saifullah Khan Bangash, 70, Pakistani politician, Senator (since 2012), heart failure.
- John Battaglia, 62, American convicted murderer, execution by lethal injection.
- André Baudry, 95, French magazine editor (Arcadie).
- Niranjan Bhagat, 91, Indian poet, stroke.
- Hazar Khan Bijarani, 71, Pakistani politician, MP (1990–1993, 1997–2013), shot.
- Cliff Bourland, 97, American sprinter, Olympic champion (1948), complications from pneumonia.
- Fidel Castro Díaz-Balart, 68, Cuban nuclear physicist and scientific adviser, suicide.
- Dino Cinel, 76, Italian-American priest and historian, stabbed.
- Kurt Cox, 70, American professional golfer, Hodgkin's lymphoma.
- Dennis Edwards, 74, American Hall of Fame soul and R&B singer (The Contours, The Temptations), complications from meningitis.
- Édouard Ferrand, 52, French politician, MEP (since 2014).
- Sonia Gechtoff, 91, American painter.
- Germain Grisez, 88, French-American philosopher.
- Nicholas von Hoffman, 88, American journalist.
- Barys Kit, 107, Belarusian rocket scientist.
- Robert Larsson, 50, Swedish ice hockey player (Skellefteå AIK), complications from a heart attack.
- Li Kelin, 75, Chinese container transport executive (China Shipping Group).
- John Jacob Lavranos, 91, South African insurance broker and botanist.
- Patricia Lindop, 87, British radiation biologist.
- Francis M. McDaniel Jr., 94, American politician.
- Michael O'Hara, 85, American Olympic volleyball player (1964), Pan-American Games champion (1959).
- Frank L. Oliver, 95, American politician, member of the Pennsylvania House of Representatives (1973–2010).
- Mowzey Radio, 33, Ugandan singer (Goodlyfe Crew), head injury.
- Fariha Razzaq Haroon, 61–62, Pakistani politician, shot.
- Sewall Shurtz, 84, American Olympic fencer (1956).
- Palle Sørensen, 90, Danish convicted murderer.
- Alan Stout, 85, American composer.
- Su Bai, 95, Chinese archaeologist.
- William Whitehead, 86, Canadian writer.

=== 2 ===
- Boaz Arad, 61, Israeli artist, suicide by hanging.
- Fabinho Azevedo, 41, Brazilian-born Togolese footballer (A.D. Isidro Metapán), traffic collision.
- Dave Barrett, 87, Canadian politician, Premier of British Columbia (1972–1975), Alzheimer's disease.
- John Bender, 79, American politician.
- Carlo Brugnami, 79, Italian racing cyclist.
- Sanford Diller, 89, American real estate developer and philanthropist.
- Michael Fleisher, 75, American comic book writer (Jonah Hex, Spectre, Ghost Rider).
- Derek Freeman, 93, Australian politician, member of the New South Wales Legislative Council (1973–1981, 1981–1984).
- Albina Girfanova, 61, Russian linguist and anthropologist.
- Tomás Gutiérrez, 77, Puerto Rican basketball player (Leones de Ponce).
- Jon Huntsman Sr., 80, American chemical manufacturer and philanthropist, prostate cancer.
- Effy Irvine, 93, Scottish minister.
- Malcolm Jefferson, 71, British racehorse trainer.
- Paulo Júnior, 33, Brazilian footballer (Incheon United, Al-Fujairah), leukemia.
- Alan Maynard, 73, British health economist.
- Durk van der Mei, 93, Dutch politician, Secretary of State (1977–1981).
- Kingunge Ngombale–Mwiru, 87, Tanzanian politician, MP (2000–2010).
- Joseph Polchinski, 63, American theoretical physicist, cancer.
- Ole Thestrup, 69, Danish actor (Borgen, The Green Butchers, Ronal Barbaren), lung cancer.
- Melvyn Weiss, 82, American attorney, complications from amyotrophic lateral sclerosis.

=== 3 ===
- Bert Brown, 79, Canadian politician, Senator (2007–2013).
- Sam Cataldo, 80, American politician, member of the New Hampshire Senate (2012–2016), traffic collision.
- Leon "Ndugu" Chancler, 65, American jazz/pop drummer ("Billie Jean"), prostate cancer.
- Paul Clipson, 53, American film director and projectionist.
- Pierre Conner, 85, American mathematician.
- Ted Corbett, 94, New Zealand organic chemist (University of Otago).
- Roy Dietzel, 87, American baseball player (Washington Senators).
- Roman Filipov, 33, Russian fighter pilot, suicide by grenade explosion.
- Michael Gordon, 62, Australian journalist (The Age), heart attack.
- Michael Harner, 88, American anthropologist and author.
- Lakshmi Kanakala, 78, Indian actress, cardiac arrest.
- Federico Leardini, 38, Italian economic journalist, heart attack.
- Oswaldo Loureiro, 85, Brazilian actor.
- Bert Lundin, 96, Swedish union leader.
- Károly Palotai, 82, Hungarian football player and referee, Olympic champion (1964).
- Ilse Petri, 99, German actress.
- Dirk Bernard Joseph Schouten, 95, Dutch economist.
- Alec Sehon, 93, Romanian-born Canadian immunologist.
- George Shadid, 88, American politician, member of the Illinois Senate (1993–2006).
- Hukum Singh, 79, Indian politician, MP (since 2014).
- Bill Teale, 70, American educator.
- Tillie Fay Walker, 88, American civil rights activist.
- Rolf Zacher, 76, German actor (Jaider, der einsame Jäger, Angelo und Luzy, Rising to the Bait).

=== 4 ===
- Frank Allen, 91, Australian footballer (East Perth, Western Australia), cancer.
- Zvi Arad, 75, Israeli mathematician.
- Majid Ariff, 80, Singaporean football player and coach.
- Alan Baker, 78, British mathematician, recipient of the Fields Medal (1970), stroke.
- Etelka Barsi-Pataky, 76, Hungarian politician, MEP (2004–2009).
- Peter L. Buttenwieser, 82, American educator and philanthropist.
- Carlos Alberto Caó, 76, Black Brazilian activist, lawyer, and politician, federal deputy from Rio de Janeiro (1982, 1987–1990).
- Don Choate, 79, American baseball player (San Francisco Giants), cancer.
- Jack Davis, 82, American politician, member of the U.S. House of Representatives (1987–1989), dementia.
- Nicholas Dopuch, 88, American accounting researcher.
- Gregor Dorfmeister, 88, German writer and journalist (Die Brücke, Town Without Pity).
- Rodney Foil, 83, American forestry researcher and academic administrator.
- Martin Grüner, 88, German politician.
- Kenneth Haigh, 86, British actor (Man at the Top, Cleopatra, Eagle in a Cage).
- Hoàng Vân, 87, Vietnamese songwriter.
- Takuya Iwasaki, 88, Japanese Middle Eastern archaeologist and professor (University of Tsukuba).
- Edwin Jackson, 26, American football player (Indianapolis Colts, Arizona Cardinals), traffic collision.
- John Mahoney, 77, English-American actor (Frasier, In the Line of Fire, Say Anything...), Tony winner (1986), complications from throat cancer.
- Esmond Bradley Martin, 76, American conservationist, stabbed.
- Nat Neujean, 95, Belgian sculptor.
- Séamus Pattison, 81, Irish politician, TD (1961–2007), Parkinson's disease.
- Laurin Pepper, 88, American football and baseball player (Southern Miss Golden Eagles, Pittsburgh Pirates).
- Wojciech Pokora, 83, Polish actor.
- Leif Rygg, 77, Norwegian fiddler, cancer.
- Irina Sanpiter, 60, Russian actress (Bianco, rosso e Verdone), leukemia.
- Jim Stillwagon, 68, American football player (Ohio State Buckeyes, Toronto Argonauts).
- Ronald H. Tills, 82, American politician.
- T. Varagunam, 87, Sri Lankan academic and physician.
- Rolv Yttrehus, 91, American composer.

=== 5 ===
- John Agitation, 90, Trinidadian comedian.
- Siddiq Baloch, 77, Pakistani journalist and political economist, pancreatic cancer.
- Caroline Brown, 64, British cellist (Hanover Band), Krukenberg tumor.
- Chien Te-men, 74, Taiwanese actor.
- Wallace Clift, 91, American priest and academic.
- Richard Doughty, 57, English cricketer (Gloucestershire).
- Margot Duhalde, 97, Chilean pilot (Air Transport Auxiliary).
- Dovid Grossman, 71, American rabbi, traffic collision.
- Claire Harris, 80, Trinidadian-born Canadian poet.
- Ladislav Kačáni, 86, Slovak football player and coach.
- Yoshihide Kozai, 89, Japanese astronomer, liver failure.
- Ken McPherson, 90, English footballer (Coventry City, Newport County, Swindon Town).
- Bob Morrow, 71, Canadian politician, Mayor of Hamilton, Ontario (1982–2000).
- Jeremy Nunley, 46, American football player (Houston Oilers, Carolina Panthers), heart attack.
- Seán O'Connor, 82, Irish hurler (Limerick GAA) and referee.
- Domingo Pillado, 90, Chilean Olympic footballer (1952).
- Mathieu Riboulet, 57, French writer and film director, cancer.
- Francisco Rojas San Román, 59, Mexican trucker, motivational coach and politician, MP (2009–2012, since 2015), shot.
- Zeno Roth, 61, German guitarist and songwriter (Uli Jon Roth).
- Sushma Shimkhada, 82, Nepali sculptor.
- Jockie Soerjoprajogo, 63, Indonesian musician and songwriter, complications from diabetes, cirrhosis and stroke.
- Ove Stokstad, 78, Norwegian artist and jazz musician.
- Hugh Wirth, 78, Australian veterinarian and animal welfare advocate.
- Norman Zabusky, 89, American physicist.

=== 6 ===
- Fedora Alemán, 105, Venezuelan singer (Virginia).
- Aljabr, 22, American racehorse, heart attack.
- Liliana Bodoc, 59, Argentine author (La Saga de los Confines), heart attack.
- Douglas Botting, 83, English explorer and author.
- Neil Caldwell, 88, American politician.
- Bernard Darmet, 72, French Olympic racing cyclist (1968).
- Jeff Fogelson, 71, American athletic director (Xavier University).
- Nancy Funk, 66, American basketball coach, cancer.
- Doug Guetzloe, 63, American political consultant.
- André Harvey, 75, American sculptor.
- Jao Tsung-I, 100, Chinese-born Hong Kong scholar, calligrapher and painter.
- Derek Kinne, 87, British soldier.
- Joe Knollenberg, 84, American politician, member of the U.S. House of Representatives (1993–2009), Alzheimer's disease.
- Donald Lynden-Bell, 82, English astrophysicist, complications from a stroke.
- Muhiyidin Moye, 32, American political activist (Black Lives Matter), shot.
- Madavoor Vasudevan Nair, 88, Indian Kathakali dancer.
- Débora Pérez Volpin, 50, Argentine journalist and politician, member of the Buenos Aires City Legislature (since 2017), cardiac arrest.
- James W. Sire, 84, American author.
- Brunello Spinelli, 78, Italian water polo player, Olympic champion (1960), traffic collision.
- Grace Sseruwagi, 84, Ugandan Olympic boxer.
- Frida Topno, 92, Indian politician.
- John Anthony West, 85, American author and Egyptologist, cancer.
- Michael White, 58, British author and musician (Thompson Twins).

=== 7 ===
- Brahim Akhiat, 77, Moroccan author.
- Harry W. Anderson, 95, American businessman and art collector.
- John Perry Barlow, 70, American writer, lyricist (Grateful Dead) and internet activist, co-founder of Electronic Frontier Foundation.
- Nelson Cooke, 98, Australian cellist (London Symphony Orchestra, Royal Philharmonic Orchestra) and teacher (Canberra School of Music).
- Torsten Engberg, 83, Swedish military officer.
- Johny Hoffmann, 73, Luxembourgish footballer.
- Mickey Jones, 76, American drummer (Kenny Rogers and The First Edition) and actor (Home Improvement, National Lampoon's Vacation), complications from diabetes.
- Waltraud Kretzschmar, 70, East German handball player (national team), world champion (1971, 1975, 1978), Olympic silver (1976) and bronze medalist (1980).
- T. N. Krishnamurti, 85, Indian meteorologist.
- Ralph Lumenti, 81, American baseball player (Washington Senators).
- Jill Messick, 50, American film producer (Mean Girls, Frida) and talent manager (Rose McGowan), suicide.
- Newton Morton, 88, American epidemiologist.
- Herman Ferdinandus Maria Münninghoff, 96, Dutch Roman Catholic prelate, Bishop of Jayapura (1972–1997), cancer.
- Gali Muddu Krishnama Naidu, 70, Indian politician, dengue fever.
- Valerii Postoyanov, 76, Russian Olympic sport shooter (1972).
- Nabi Şensoy, 72, Turkish diplomat, ambassador to the United States (2006–2009).
- Pete Tillotson, 81, American basketball player.
- Pat Torpey, 64, American drummer (Mr. Big), complications from Parkinson's disease.
- Skule Waksvik, 90, Norwegian sculptor.
- Al Wester, 94, American sportscaster.
- Catherine G. Wolf, 70, American psychologist, complications from amyotrophic lateral sclerosis.

=== 8 ===
- Ben Agajanian, 98, American football player (New York Giants, Green Bay Packers), NFL Champion (1956, 1961).
- Zarnigar Agakisiyeva, 72, Azerbaijani actress, heart failure.
- Jarrod Bannister, 33, Australian Olympic javelin thrower (2008, 2012), Commonwealth Games champion (2010).
- Carl K. Benhase, 88, American football coach (Hanover Panthers).
- Robert Bonfils, 95, American illustrator.
- Verena Butalikakis, 62, German politician, deputy (2002–2005).
- Paul Danblon, 86, Belgian journalist and composer.
- Agenor Girardi, 66, Brazilian Roman Catholic prelate, Bishop of União da Vitória (since 2015).
- Ron Gower, 88, Australian Olympic boxer.
- Robert A. Gross, 90, American physicist and engineering scientist.
- Marie Gruber, 62, German actress (Go Trabi Go, The Lives of Others, The Reader), lung cancer.
- Don Hart, 87, Australian football player (Fitzroy).
- Algia Mae Hinton, 88, American blues singer and guitarist.
- M. Cecil Mackey, 89, American academic administrator, President of Michigan State University (1979–1985).
- John Martinkovic, 91, American football player (Green Bay Packers, New York Giants).
- Khalid Mehsud, 44, Pakistani terrorist, drone strike.
- Ebony Reigns, 20, Ghanaian singer, traffic collision.
- Carlos Robles Piquer, 92, Spanish diplomat and politician, Minister of Education and Science (1975–1976), Senator (1983–1987) and MEP (1986–1999).
- Gary Seear, 65, New Zealand rugby union player (Otago, New Zealand Colts, national team), cancer.
- Kavous Seyed-Emami, 64, Iranian environmentalist, suicide by hanging.
- Lovebug Starski, 57, American rapper and disc jockey, heart attack.
- Sandra L. Townes, 73, American judge (United States District Court for the Eastern District of New York), cancer.

=== 9 ===
- Ray Baum, 62, American politician, lawyer and lobbyist (NAB), member of the Oregon House of Representatives (1988–1996), cancer.
- Peter Beer, 89, American judge (Eastern District of Louisiana).
- Reg E. Cathey, 59, American actor (The Wire, House of Cards, Fantastic Four), Emmy winner (2015), lung cancer.
- Michael Crouch, 84, Australian investor and water boiler manufacturer (Zip Industries).
- Dolores Crow, 86, American politician and legislator, member of the Idaho House of Representatives (1982–2006).
- Antoine Culioli, 93, French linguist.
- Arnold D'Ambrosa, 85, American politician.
- Serge Daan, 77, Dutch zoologist.
- Jim Garrett, 87, American football player (BC Lions), coach (Columbia Lions) and scout (Dallas Cowboys).
- John Gavin, 86, American actor (Psycho, Spartacus, Imitation of Life) and diplomat, Ambassador to Mexico (1981–1986), pneumonia.
- Nebojša Glogovac, 48, Serbian actor (Klopka), cancer.
- István Hevesi, 86, Hungarian water polo player, Olympic champion (1956).
- Walter W. Holland, 88, Czech-born British epidemiologist.
- Jóhann Jóhannsson, 48, Icelandic film composer (The Theory of Everything, Arrival, Sicario), accidental cocaine overdose.
- Bernard Koura, 94, French painter.
- Mordechai E. Kreinin, 88, Israeli-born American economist.
- Alfonso Lacadena, 53, Spanish Mesoamerican epigraphist and academic (Complutense University of Madrid), cancer.
- Robert W. Lichtwardt, 93, Brazilian-born American mycologist.
- Craig MacGregor, 68, American bass guitarist (Foghat), lung cancer.
- Neill McGeachy, 75, American college basketball coach (Duke University) and athletic director (Lenoir–Rhyne University).
- Liam Miller, 36, Irish footballer (Manchester United, Sunderland, national team), pancreatic cancer.
- Wally Moon, 87, American baseball player (St. Louis Cardinals, Los Angeles Dodgers), World Series champion (1959, 1963, 1965).
- Henryk Niedźwiedzki, 84, Polish boxer, Olympic bronze medalist (1956).
- "Sunshine" Sonny Payne, 92, American radio presenter (KFFA).
- Edward Pearce, 78, English political journalist and writer.
- Bruno Rossetti, 57, Italian sport shooter, Olympic bronze medalist (1992).
- Anne Treisman, 82, British psychologist.
- Edward Vebell, 96, American Olympic fencer (1952) and illustrator.
- Wesla Whitfield, 70, American singer, complications from bladder cancer.
- Keith M. Wilson, 73, British historian.

=== 10 ===
- Kenneth E. Bailey Sr., 71, American politician.
- Advent Bangun, 66, Indonesian karateka and actor (The Devil's Sword), diabetes.
- Sir Alan Battersby, 92, British organic chemist.
- Russell Beck, 76, New Zealand archaeologist.
- Jeff Bell, 74, American political consultant, presidential speechwriter and politician.
- Fran Bera, 93, American aviator.
- Troy Blakely, 68, American music executive and talent manager (Sammy Hagar, Red Hot Chili Peppers, Poison), cancer.
- Tina Louise Bomberry, 52, Canadian Mohawk actress (North of 60).
- Walter Boucquet, 76, Belgian racing cyclist.
- Sir Lawrence Byford, 92, British police officer and author, Chief Inspector of Constabulary (1983–1987).
- Bevan Congdon, 79, New Zealand cricketer (Central Districts, Canterbury, national team).
- Rosa Ferrer Obiols, 57, Andorran politician, MP (1994–2001, 2005–2007), Mayor of Andorra la Vella (2007–2015) and Minister of Health, Welfare and Occupation (2015–2016), cancer.
- Michiko Ishimure, 90, Japanese writer, complications from Parkinson's disease.
- Raimund Herincx, 90, British bass-baritone.
- Tamio Kawachi, 79, Japanese actor (Story of a Prostitute, Tokyo Drifter, Gappa: The Triphibian Monster), cerebral infarction.
- Richard C. Lamb, 84, American astrophysicist.
- Stephen A. Mahin, 71, American structural engineer.
- Angel Maldonado, 90, Mexican Olympic swimmer.
- Donald Mark, 91, American judge (New York Supreme Court).
- William Merriweather Peña, 99, American architect.
- John Muir, 73, Australian judge.
- Myroslav Popovych, 87, Ukrainian philosopher.
- Ludmila Švédová, 81, Czech gymnast, Olympic silver medalist (1960).
- Chris Stockwell, 60, Canadian politician, Ontario MPP (1990–2003) and Speaker (1996–1999), cancer.
- V. Joseph Thomas, 76, Indian police chief.
- Peter Thonemann, 100, Australian-born British physicist.
- Calvin Edouard Ward, 92, American concert pianist.

=== 11 ===
- Anthony Acevedo, 93, American soldier and diarist.
- Darien Boswell, 79, New Zealand Olympic rower (1964).
- Sister Claire, 81, Indian Roman Catholic nun and artist.
- Robert E. Cleary, 86, American sergeant major.
- Michael Cohen, 80, American physician and anthropologist, pneumonia.
- Vic Damone, 89, American pop singer ("On the Street Where You Live", "You're Breaking My Heart"), complications from respiratory illness.
- Ramendra Narayan Debbarma, 68, Indian politician, MLA (since 2013), stroke.
- Jon D. Fox, 70, American politician, member of the U.S. House of Representatives (1995–1999), cancer.
- Parbati Ghose, 84, Indian actress and film director, first female filmmaker from Odisha.
- Asma Jahangir, 66, Pakistani human rights activist and lawyer, President of SCBAP (2010–2012) and Special Rapporteur on Human Rights in Iran (since 2016), heart attack.
- Marie Johnson-Calloway, 97, American artist.
- Lâm Ngươn Tánh, 89, Vietnamese military officer.
- Joseph MacNeil, 93, Canadian Roman Catholic prelate, Bishop of Saint John (1969–1973), Archbishop of Edmonton (1973–1999).
- Jan Maxwell, 61, American actress and singer (Chitty Chitty Bang Bang, Follies, Gossip Girl), meningitis complicated from breast cancer.
- Des Moroney, 82, Canadian-born Swedish ice hockey player and coach (Leksand, Västerås, Örebro).
- Juozas Preikšas, 91, Lithuanian Roman Catholic prelate, Bishop of Panevėžys (1989–2002).
- Tom Rapp, 70, American singer-songwriter (Pearls Before Swine), cancer.
- Jean Renaux, 84, French Olympic sports shooter (1960, 1964).
- Andy Rice, 77, American football player (Kansas City Chiefs, Cincinnati Bengals, Chicago Bears).
- Dick Scott, 76, English footballer (Norwich City F. C.).
- John Nanzip Shagaya, 75, Nigerian politician, Minister of Internal Affairs (1985–1990), traffic collision.
- Sir Nicholas Shehadie, 92, Australian rugby union player (Randwick, New South Wales, national team), Lord Mayor of Sydney (1973–1975).
- Sun Shu, 84, Chinese geologist, Director of the Institute of Geology, Chinese Academy of Sciences.
- Jack Sinclair, 90, New Zealand runner and neurophysiologist.
- Raymond Vautherin, 82, French-born Italian linguist.
- Qazi Wajid, 87, Pakistani actor (Ankahi, Tanhaiyaan, Dhoop Kinare) and radio personality, heart attack.

=== 12 ===
- Paul R. Abramson, 80, American political scientist.
- Marty Allen, 95, American actor and comedian (Allen & Rossi), complications from pneumonia.
- Mohammed Amin, 89, Indian politician and trade unionist.
- Weems Oliver Baskin III, 81, American politician, member of the South Carolina House of Representatives (1972–1974).
- Jean-Jacques Béchio, 68, Ivorian politician.
- Martin van der Borgh, 83, Dutch racing cyclist.
- Dave Clark, 81, American Olympic pole vaulter (1960), cancer.
- Bill Crider, 76, American author, cancer.
- Leo Falcam, 82, Micronesian politician, President of the Federated States of Micronesia (1999–2003), Vice President (1997–1999), Governor of Pohnpei (1979–1983).
- Giuseppe Galasso, 88, Italian historian and politician, Deputy (1983–1994).
- Jef Geys, 83, Belgian artist.
- Luo Haocai, 83, Chinese politician and legal scholar, chairman of China Zhi Gong Party.
- Abdul Manan Ismail, 69, Malaysian politician, fall.
- Louise Latham, 95, American actress (Marnie).
- Jack Ludwig, 95, Canadian author.
- Ursula Marvin, 96, American planetary geologist.
- Grant McBride, 68, Australian politician, member of the Parliament of New South Wales (1992–2011), Alzheimer's disease.
- László Melis, 64, Hungarian composer and violinist.
- Alexander B. Morrison, 87, American religious leader, general authority of the LDS Church (since 1987).
- Fethia Mzali, 90, Tunisian politician, country's first female government minister.
- Gerald Reaven, 89, American endocrinologist.
- Rudy Regalado, 87, American baseball player (Cleveland Indians).
- Daryle Singletary, 46, American country music singer ("I Let Her Lie", "The Note", "Amen Kind of Love").
- Mogau Tshehla, 26, South African footballer (Witbank Spurs, Polokwane City), traffic collision.
- Françoise Xenakis, 87, French writer.

=== 13 ===
- Edward M. Abroms, 82, American film editor (Blue Thunder, The Sugarland Express, Street Fighter), heart failure.
- Joseph Bonnel, 79, French footballer (Marseille, national team).
- Scott Boyer, 70, American singer, songwriter and musician (Cowboy, The 31st of February).
- Carriega, 88, Spanish football coach (Real Zaragoza, Sevilla, Atlético Madrid).
- Chyskillz, 48, American hip hop producer, heart attack.
- Danilinho, 32, Brazilian footballer (Chapecoense, Juazeirense), heart attack.
- Florin Diacu, 58, Romanian-born Canadian mathematician.
- Dobri Dobrev, 103, Bulgarian ascetic and philanthropist.
- James W. Downing, 104, American naval officer and author, commanding officer of USS Patapsco, complications from heart surgery.
- Tito Francona, 84, American baseball player (Cleveland Indians, Atlanta Braves, Baltimore Orioles).
- Ernest Hecht, 88, Czechoslovak-born British publisher.
- Henrik, Prince Consort of Denmark, 83, French-born Danish royal consort (since 1972), complications from pneumonia.
- Sandra Love, 72, American politician, member of the New Jersey General Assembly (2008–2010).
- John McMartin, 73, Australian rugby player.
- Victor Milán, 63, American author (Wild Cards, Deathlands, BattleTech), cancer.
- Geir Magnus Nyborg, 66, Norwegian theologian.
- Danko Radić, 65, Croatian basketball referee and coach.
- Carmela Rey, 86, Mexican singer and actress.
- John Robb, 85, Northern Irish politician and surgeon.
- Josefina Samper, 90, Spanish syndicalist, communist and feminist.
- George P. Steele, 93, American military officer.
- Nini Theilade, 102, Danish ballet dancer and choreographer (A Midsummer Night's Dream, Ballet Russe de Monte Carlo).
- Peter Daniel Truman, 83, American politician, member of the Pennsylvania House of Representatives (1983–1988).
- John Turnbull, 82, New Zealand cricketer.

=== 14 ===
- Zoltán Agócs, 79, Slovak architect (Apollo Bridge).
- Abolfazl Anvari, 80, Iranian Olympic wrestler (1968, 1972), world championship bronze medalist (1966, 1969).
- Lois Barker, 94, American baseball player (AAGPBL).
- Lev Bayandin, 76, Russian politician, Governor of Yamalo-Nenets Autonomous Okrug (1991–1994).
- Lerone Bennett Jr., 89, American scholar and author, editor of Ebony, vascular dementia.
- Angus Black, 92, Scottish rugby player (Lions, national team).
- Pyotr Bochek, 92, Ukrainian military officer, Hero of the Soviet Union (1945).
- Don Carter, 84, American investor, founding owner of the Dallas Mavericks.
- Marty Dolin, 78, American-born Canadian politician, Manitoba MLA for Kildonan (1985–1988).
- Claes Elmstedt, 89, Swedish politician, MP (1965–1984), Minister for Communications (1981–1982).
- Nuray Hafiftaş, 53, Turkish folk singer.
- Billy Henderson, 89, American football coach (Clarke Central).
- Antoni Krauze, 78, Polish screenwriter and director.
- Ruud Lubbers, 78, Dutch politician, diplomat and businessman, Prime Minister (1982–1994), United Nations High Commissioner for Refugees (2001–2005), euthanasia.
- Arthur J. Moss, 86, American cardiologist (University of Rochester).
- John Pitman, 77, American journalist.
- Bolla Bulli Ramaiah, 91, Indian politician.
- Morgan Tsvangirai, 65, Zimbabwean politician and opposition leader, Prime Minister (2009–2013), colorectal cancer.
- AnnMarie Wolpe, 87, South African feminist, sociologist and academic.

=== 15 ===
- Abdilaqim Ademi, 48, Macedonian politician, MP (2002–2006) and Minister of Education and Science (2014–2016).
- Lassie Lou Ahern, 97, American actress (Our Gang, Uncle Tom's Cabin), complications from influenza.
- Abdon Alinovi, 94, Italian politician, deputy (1976–1992).
- Bibi Ballandi, 71, Italian television producer, colorectal cancer.
- Tosun Bayrak, 92, Turkish writer and artist.
- Ivar Belck-Olsen, 86, Norwegian politician.
- Tom Brewer, 86, American baseball player (Boston Red Sox).
- Don J. Briel, 71, American theologian, leukemia.
- Leo Cahill, 89, American-Canadian football coach (Toronto Argonauts).
- Pier Paolo Capponi, 79, Italian actor (The Cat o' Nine Tails).
- Steven Collins, 66, British-born American Buddhist studies scholar.
- Marian Czachor, 93, Polish footballer
- Jacques Hébert, 97, French politician, Mayor of Cherbourg (1958–1977), Deputy (1962–1973).
- Wynn Irwin, 85, American actor (Lotsa Luck, Hart to Hart, Die Hard 2).
- Geoff Jones, 87, Australian football player (St Kilda).
- Chuck Klausing, 92, American football player (Penn State) and Hall of Fame coach (IUP, Carnegie Mellon).
- Milan Křížek, 91, Czech composer.
- Iseabail Macleod, 81, Scottish lexicographer.
- Gian Paolo Mele, 73, Italian composer, choral director and musicologist.
- Samuel Mpasu, 72, Malawian politician and author, Speaker of the National Assembly (1999–2003), hypertension.
- Tamara Nizhnikova, 92, Belarusian singer, People's Artist of the USSR (1964).
- J. Clay Smith Jr., 75, American jurist and author, chairman of the EEOC, complications from Alzheimer's disease.
- Daniel Vernet, 72, French journalist and author, heart attack.

=== 16 ===
- Napoleon Abueva, 88, Filipino sculptor, National Artist for Visual Arts.
- Constance Bapela, South African politician, heart attack.
- Reidar Berg, 93, Norwegian Olympic bobsledder (1948).
- Jim Bridwell, 73, American free climber, complications from hepatitis C.
- Little Sammy Davis, 89, American blues singer-songwriter and harmonicist.
- Hubert Doggart, 92, English cricketer (Cambridge, Sussex, national team).
- Gerald Ensley, 66, American journalist (Tallahassee Democrat).
- Charles W. Eriksen, 95, American psychologist.
- Joe L. Hayes, 87, American politician.
- Kikuko Inoue, 93, Japanese Olympic equestrian.
- Heli Lääts, 85, Estonian singer.
- Eleanor Winsor Leach, 80, American academic.
- Gochomu J. Mudzingwa, 101, Zimbabwean traditional ruler, Chief Wozhele (since 2008), pneumonia.
- Harry R. Purkey, 83, American politician, member of the Virginia House of Delegates (1986–2014).
- Hans Rinner, 54, Austrian football official, President of Bundesliga (since 2009), cancer.
- Alexander Sevastian, 41, Russian-born Canadian accordionist, heart attack.
- Miroslav Šlouf, 69, Czech lobbyist (Lukoil), cirrhosis.
- Greg Smyth, 51, Canadian ice hockey player (Quebec Nordiques, Philadelphia Flyers, Calgary Flames), cancer.
- Deryck Stapleton, 100, British Royal Air Force officer.
- Osvaldo Suárez, 83, Argentine Olympic long-distance runner (1960, 1964), Pan-American Games champion (1955, 1959, 1963).
- Mike Walker, 72, American gossip columnist (National Enquirer).
- Jayadeva Yogendra, 88, Indian yoga guru.

=== 17 ===
- Ya'akov Ben-Yezri, 90, Moroccan-born Israeli politician, member of Knesset (2006–2009) and Minister of Health (2006–2009).
- Martin Buvik, 95, Norwegian politician, MP (1965–1977).
- Blas Calzada Terrados, 80, Spanish economist, Chairman of INE (1977–1979) and President of CNMV (2001–2004), stomach cancer.
- Silvio Conrado, 72, Nicaraguan economist and banker, cardiac arrest.
- Jacques Deslauriers, 89, Canadian ice hockey player (Montreal Canadiens).
- Jim Dickey, 83, American football coach (Kansas State).
- Beebe Freitas, 79, American pianist and vocal coach.
- Roberto Gandolfi, 61, Italian Olympic water polo player.
- Doris Graber, 94, American political scientist.
- Akinwunmi Isola, 78, Nigerian playwright and actor.
- Boyd Jarvis, 59, American music producer (Herbie Hancock, La Toya Jackson, Johnny Kemp), cancer.
- Emmanuele Kanyama, 55, Malawian Roman Catholic prelate, Bishop of Dedza (since 2007), complications from diabetes.
- Kenneth Kester, 81, American politician, member of the Colorado House of Representatives (1998–2002) and Colorado Senate (2003–2011).
- Vasily Krylov, 71, Russian biologist.
- Peter Moon, 73, American musician.
- Gumercindo España Olivares, 83, Mexican toymaker.
- Miguel Pacheco, 86, Spanish racing cyclist.
- Peder Persson, 79, Swedish footballer.
- Mikey Post, 35, American actor (Pair of Kings), complications from amyotrophic lateral sclerosis.
- Dorothy Rungeling, 106, Canadian aviation pioneer.
- Rapee Sagarik, 95, Thai orchidologist.
- Mohamed Shahabuddeen, 86, Guyanese politician and judge (International Court of Justice, Yugoslavia tribunal, International Criminal Court), Vice President (1983–1988).
- Sampie Terreblanche, 84, South African economist and writer, brain cancer.
- Gerald Weiß, 58, German Olympic javelin thrower (1988).

=== 18 ===
- Rein Ahas, 51, Estonian geographer, heart attack.
- Abbas Alasgarov, 80, Azerbaijani civil engineer and politician.
- Günter Blobel, 81, German-born American biologist, Nobel Prize laureate (1999), cancer.
- Peggy Cooper Cafritz, 70, American social activist and educator, co-founder of the Duke Ellington School of the Arts, complications from pneumonia.
- José Luis Elejalde, 67, Cuban footballer (FC La Habana).
- Victor Franco, 87, French journalist.
- Sonia Graham, 88, British actress (Compact, London's Burning, One by One).
- Murray David Maitland Keddie, 88, British businessman.
- Peirce F. Lewis, 90, American geographer.
- Didier Lockwood, 62, French jazz violinist, heart attack.
- Larry Lolley, 72, American state judge, member of the Louisiana Circuit Courts of Appeal (2003–2017).
- Georgi Markov, 46, Bulgarian footballer (Lokomotiv Sofia, Levski Sofia, Botev Plovdiv), heart attack.
- John David Morley, 70, English writer and journalist.
- Nazif Mujić, 47, Bosnian actor (An Episode in the Life of an Iron Picker).
- Kandiah Neelakandan, 70, Sri Lankan lawyer.
- Idrissa Ouédraogo, 64, Burkinabé film director.
- Pavel Panov, 67, Bulgarian football player and coach (Levski Sofia, Aris, national team).
- Lee Harris Pomeroy, 85, American architect.
- K. S. Puttannaiah, 68, Indian politician, MLA for Pandavapura (1994–1999) and Melukote (since 2013), heart attack.
- Elmar Rojas, 75, Guatemalan artist.
- Eido Tai Shimano, 85, Japanese Buddhist monk.
- Ivor Smith, 92, British architect (Park Hill).
- Heiner Stadler, 75, German jazz musician and producer.
- Hans Streuli, 93-94, Swiss Olympic runner.
- Chinedu Udoji, 28, Nigerian footballer (Enyimba, Kano Pillars), traffic collision.
- Barbara Wersba, 85, American youth writer (Tunes for a Small Harmonica).

=== 19 ===
- Hernán Alzamora, 90, Peruvian Olympic hurdler (1948).
- Thomas B. Berns, 72, American politician, complications following heart surgery.
- Judy Blame, 58, English stylist and art director.
- Harry Blevins, 82, American politician, member of the Virginia House of Delegates (1998–2001) and Senate (2001–2013).
- Fred Carr, 71, American football player (Green Bay Packers), dementia and prostate cancer.
- Max Desfor, 104, American photographer (Associated Press), Pulitzer Prize winner (1951).
- Jean-Paul Faber, 87, French Olympic sports shooter.
- Edward Fike, 93, American politician.
- Teresa Gisbert Carbonell, 91, Bolivian architect and art historian.
- Gundu Hanumantha Rao, 61, Indian actor and comedian.
- Floros Konstantinou, 65, Greek politician, economist and historian, Member of the Parliament of the Hellenes (1981–1996, 2000–2004).
- Sergei Litvinov, 60, Russian hammer thrower, Olympic champion (1988) and silver medalist (1980), world champion (1983, 1987), heart attack.
- Thomas Lockhart, 82, American politician, member of the Wyoming House of Representatives (2001–2017).
- Robert McKim, 72, American politician, member of the Wyoming House of Representatives (2009–2017).
- Necton Mhura, 61, Malawian diplomat, Ambassador to the United Nations (since 2016) and the United States (2015–2016), cancer.
- Catherine Nevin, 67, Irish murderer, brain tumour.
- Sir John Orr, 72, British police officer.
- Daniel Peredo, 48, Peruvian sports journalist, heart attack.
- Geoff Pimblett, 73, British rugby league player (England, St Helens R.F.C., Lancashire).
- Jerry Raymond, 89, American football coach.
- Charles Pence Slichter, 94, American physicist.
- Larry Smith, 79, American puppeteer.
- Jim Springer, 91, American basketball player (Indianapolis Jets, Bridgeport Roesslers).
- Sir Peter Squire, 72, British Royal Air Force officer, Chief of the Air Staff (2000–2003).
- Stormin, 34, British grime musician, skin cancer.
- Sabah Tani, 49, Bangladeshi singer, low blood pressure.
- Yuriy Tyukalov, 87, Russian rower, Olympic champion (1952, 1956).
- Zhang Junsheng, 81, Chinese politician and academic, cardiac arrest.

=== 20 ===
- David Barons, 81, British racehorse trainer.
- Sonja Bata, 91, Swiss shoe museum curator and philanthropist.
- Jo Beddoe, 73, British arts administrator and theatre producer.
- Lucien Bouchardeau, 56, Nigerien football referee, heart failure.
- John Boyd, 92, Scottish milliner.
- David Caron, 65, American legal scholar.
- Jiichiro Date, 66, Japanese wrestler, Olympic champion (1976).
- Herbert Ehrenberg, 91, German politician, Minister of Labour and Social Affairs (1976–1982).
- Bill Flick, 91, Canadian ice hockey player (Lethbridge Maple Leafs).
- William H. Friedland, 94, American rural sociologist.
- Arnaud Geyre, 82, French racing cyclist, Olympic champion (1956).
- B. K. Goyal, 82, Indian cardiologist, cardiac arrest.
- DeWitt Hale, 100, American politician, Member of the Texas House of Representatives (1939–1940, 1953–1978).
- Jorma Hotanen, 81, Finnish Olympic pentathlete.
- Joe Hung, 86, Taiwanese journalist (Central News Agency) and diplomat, Representative to Italy (1993–2000), heart and lung disease.
- Tōta Kaneko, 98, Japanese writer.
- Alvin B. Koeneman, 84, American rear admiral.
- Agnieszka Kotulanka, 61, Polish actress.
- Lionel March, 84, British mathematician, architect and digital artist.
- Howard McCurdy, 85, Canadian politician, MP for Windsor—Walkerville (1984–1988) and Windsor—Tecumseh (1988–1993), cancer.
- Roy McDonald, 80, Canadian poet, author and musician.
- Sir Donald Murray, 95, Northern Irish jurist.
- Andrew Ranicki, 69, British mathematician, leukaemia.
- Irene Strong, 88, Canadian Olympic swimmer (1948, 1952).
- Waldo R. Tobler, 87, American geographer and cartographer.
- Zigmas Zinkevičius, 93, Lithuanian linguist-historian.

=== 21 ===
- Valentin Afraimovich, 72, Russian mathematician.
- Ian Aitken, 90, British journalist and political commentator.
- Sergei Aleksandrov, 44, Russian footballer (Orenburg, Luch Vladivostok).
- Vic Andreetti, 76, British boxer, cancer.
- Arthur Black, 74, Canadian radio broadcaster (CBC), pancreatic cancer.
- Lawrence D. Brown, 77, American statistician.
- Thomas M. Carsey, 52, American political scientist, complications from amyotrophic lateral sclerosis.
- Emma Chambers, 53, English actress (The Vicar of Dibley, Notting Hill, How Do You Want Me?), heart attack.
- Kalyan Singh Chauhan, 58, Indian politician, MLA for Nathdwara (since 2008), cancer.
- Chow Chee Keong, 69, Malaysian footballer (national team), bladder cancer.
- John Cribb, 67, Australian triple murderer and rapist.
- Antenore Cuel, 95, Italian Olympic cross-country skier.
- Zelda D'Aprano, 90, Australian political activist.
- Harriet Fier, 67, American magazine and newspaper editor (Rolling Stone, The Washington Post), breast cancer.
- Beryl Fletcher, 79, New Zealand novelist.
- Billy Graham, 99, American evangelist and Southern Baptist minister.
- Kurt Hansen, 90, footballer
- Taïeb Louhichi, 69, Tunisian film director (Shadow of the Earth).
- Betty Miller, 91, American aviator, first female pilot to fly solo across the Pacific Ocean.
- Ren Osugi, 66, Japanese actor, heart failure.
- John R. Schmidhauser, 96, American politician, member of the U. S. House of Representatives from Iowa's 1st congressional district (1965–1967).
- Lokendra Singh, 41, Indian politician, MLA for Noorpur (since 2012), traffic collision.
- Giuseppe Turini, 90, Italian politician, Senator (1992–2001).

=== 22 ===
- Marilyn Fain Apseloff, 83, American children's writer.
- Errol Buddle, 89, Australian jazz musician.
- Serban Cantacuzino, 89, Romanian architect.
- Nanette Fabray, 97, American actress and singer (High Button Shoes, Caesar's Hour, One Day at a Time), Tony (1949) and Emmy Award-winner (1956, 1957).
- Valentin Falin, 91, Russian Soviet-era diplomat and politician.
- Forges, 76, Spanish cartoonist (El Jueves, Diario 16, El País), pancreatic cancer.
- Billi Gordon, 63, American actor, model and neuroscientist.
- Euler Granda, 82, Ecuadorian poet, writer and psychiatrist.
- Jack Hamilton, 79, American baseball player (Philadelphia Phillies, California Angels, New York Mets).
- Bette Henritze, 93, American actress (The Hospital, The World According to Garp, Other People's Money).
- Peter Kocot, 61, American politician, member of the Massachusetts House of Representatives (since 2002).
- Bence Lázár, 26, Hungarian footballer (Újpest FC, SV Würmla), leukemia.
- Li Ching, 69, Hong Kong actress. (body discovered on this date)
- Gladys Maccabe, 99, Northern Irish artist.
- William Serrin, 78, American journalist (Detroit Free Press), winner of Pulitzer Prize (1968), heart attack.
- László Tahi Tóth, 74, Hungarian actor, stroke.
- Richard E. Taylor, 88, Canadian physicist, Nobel Prize laureate (1990).
- Billy Wilson, 71, English footballer (Blackburn Rovers, Portsmouth).

=== 23 ===
- Dom Anile, 80, American football coach and executive (Indianapolis Colts).
- James Colby, 56, American actor (Patriots Day, Tower Heist, Empire).
- Frank Deighton, 90, Scottish amateur golfer.
- Graeme Gahan, 76, Australian footballer (Richmond).
- Ali Teoman Germaner, 83–84, Turkish sculptor.
- Lewis Gilbert, 97, British film director (You Only Live Twice, Alfie, Educating Rita).
- James Laxer, 76, Canadian political economist.
- Donovan McClelland, 69, Northern Irish politician.
- Saichiro Misumi, 101, Japanese indologist.
- Allen B. Rosenstein, 97, American systems engineer.
- Celal Şahin, 92, Turkish musician and actor.
- Sir Kenneth Scott, 87, British diplomat and courtier.
- Teddi Siddall, 64, American actress.
- Jesus Varela, 90, Filipino Roman Catholic prelate, Bishop of Sorsogon (1980–2003).
- Wolfhart Westendorf, 93, German Egyptologist.

=== 24 ===
- Getulio Alviani, 78, Italian painter.
- Kalman Aron, 93, Holocaust survivor and artist.
- Shmuel Auerbach, 86, Israeli Haredi rabbi, heart disease.
- Eitan Avitsur, 76, Israeli composer and conductor.
- Judith Baxter, 62–63, British sociolinguist.
- Irwin Belk, 95, American politician, philanthropist and retail executive (Belk), member of the North Carolina Senate (1963–1966) and House of Representatives (1959–1962).
- Wim Claes, 56, Belgian composer, songwriter and music producer.
- Jacqueline Froom, 89, British poet and lyricist.
- Sir Durward Knowles, 100, Bahamian sailor, Olympic champion (1964), kidney failure.
- Ed Leede, 90, American basketball player (Boston Celtics).
- Bud Luckey, 83, American animator and voice actor (Toy Story, Boundin', Winnie the Pooh), stroke.
- James McIntosh, 87, American rower, Olympic silver medalist (1956).
- Folco Quilici, 87, Italian film director and screenwriter.
- Bhanu Kumar Shastri, 92, Indian politician.
- Sridevi, 54, Indian actress (English Vinglish), accidental drowning.
- Óscar Julio Vian Morales, 70, Guatemalan Roman Catholic prelate, Archbishop of Santiago de Guatemala (since 2010), cancer.
- Charles Byron Wilson, 88, American neurosurgeon, heart disease.
- Yang Rudai, 91, Chinese politician, member of the Politburo of the Chinese Communist Party.

=== 25 ===
- Urban Bowman, 80, American-Canadian football coach (Winnipeg Blue Bombers, Hamilton Tiger Cats), prostate cancer.
- Max Cole, 77, Australian football player (Fitzroy).
- Dai Fudong, 89, Chinese architect, member of the Chinese Academy of Engineering.
- Dan Fegan, 56, American basketball agent (DeMarcus Cousins, John Wall, Ricky Rubio), traffic collision.
- Danny Florencio, 70, Filipino basketball player (Toyota, Crispa, U/Tex), heart attack.
- Ainsley Gotto, 72, Australian political secretary and interior designer, cancer.
- Michael Green, 91, British journalist and writer.
- Cynthia Heimel, 70, American columnist, author and humorist, complications from dementia.
- Richard Hundley, 86, American pianist and composer.
- Branko Kubala, 69, Czechoslovak-born Spanish footballer (RCD Espanyol, Dallas Tornado).
- Burton Leland, 69, American politician, member of the Michigan Senate (1999–2006) and House of Representatives (1981–1998), cancer.
- Leif Liljeroth, 93, Swedish actor.
- John C. Mula, 75, American art director and production designer (Barney Miller, Charles in Charge, Dinosaurs).
- Nev Pask, 87, Australian property developer.
- Henri Pouzère, 79, Central African politician and lawyer.
- Ram Punjabi, 89, Indian cricket umpire.
- Ola Thorleif Ruud, 91, Norwegian politician.
- Frank Sander, 90, American law professor.
- Noel Scott, 88, New Zealand politician, MP for Tongariro (1984–1990).
- Bruce Nelson Stratton, 74, American radio personality (WPLO), throat cancer.
- Scott Westgarth, 31, British boxer, injuries sustained in match.
- Tsvetan Veselinov, 70, Bulgarian footballer (Levski Sofia, national team), Olympic silver medalist (1968).
- Penny Vincenzi, 78, British writer.

=== 26 ===
- Joseph Achuzie, 88–89, Nigerian politician and secessionist Biafran military commander.
- William L. Blaser, 94, American politician.
- Sir Richard Body, 90, English politician, MP for Boston and Skegness (1966–2001) and Billericay (1955–1959).
- Ernest Bohr, 93, Danish lawyer and Olympic field hockey player (1948).
- Mies Bouwman, 88, Dutch television presenter, pneumonia.
- Patrick Cusick, 98, American civil engineer and city planner, executive director of the Pittsburgh Regional Planning Association (1957–1964).
- Paul De Meo, 64, American screenwriter (The Rocketeer, Trancers, The Flash) and television producer.
- Jim Dobson, 78, American baseball player.
- Alan Geldard, 90, British cyclist, Olympic bronze medalist (1948).
- Jim L. Gillis Jr., 101, American politician.
- Jerry Hendren, 70, American football player (Denver Broncos).
- Juan Hidalgo Codorniu, 90, Spanish composer.
- Sir Paul Jenkins, 63, British lawyer, Treasury Solicitor (2006–2014).
- Mariadas Kagithapu, 81, Indian Roman Catholic prelate, Archbishop of Visakhapatnam (1982–2012).
- Tatyana Karpova, 102, Russian actress, People's Artist of the USSR (1990).
- Sean Lavery, 61, American ballet dancer (New York City Ballet).
- Li Boguang, 49, Chinese legal scholar and human rights activist, liver cancer.
- Giorgi Maisashvili, 55, Georgian economist and politician, cancer.
- Benjamin Melniker, 104, American film producer (Batman, Constantine, National Treasure).
- Peter Miles, 89, English actor (Z-Cars, Doctor Who, Blake's 7).
- Carmen A. Orechio, 91, American politician, member of the New Jersey Senate (1974–1992).
- Thomas Pernes, 62, Austrian avant-garde composer.
- Michael J. Pikal, 78, American pharmaceutical scientist.
- Gary H. Posner, 74, American chemist, Parkinson's disease.
- Veljko Rus, 88, Slovenian sociologist.
- T. S. R. Subramanian, 79, Indian civil servant, Cabinet Secretary (1996–1998), chancellor of Shiv Nadar University.
- Muriel Turner, Baroness Turner of Camden, 90, British politician.
- Susan Wood, 64-65, Canadian visual artist.

=== 27 ===
- Gertrude Alderfer, 86, American baseball player (AAGPBL).
- Joseph Bagobiri, 60, Nigerian Roman Catholic prelate, Bishop of Kafanchan (since 1995).
- Albert Benschop, 68, Dutch sociologist.
- William H. T. Bush, 79, American venture capitalist and financier.
- Lance Clark, 81, British shoemaker (Clarks).
- Gabriel Cruz, 8, Spanish boy, suffocated.
- Steve Folkes, 59, Australian rugby league player (Canterbury Bulldogs, Hull FC, New South Wales), heart attack.
- Marianne Githens, 83, American political scientist, heart attack.
- Sumner Jules Glimcher, 93, American filmmaker and author.
- Makoto Hirayama, 65, Japanese politician.
- M. Jaishankar, 41, Indian serial killer and rapist, suicide by throat-cutting.
- Henri Leonetti, 81, French footballer (Marseille).
- Bill Lignante, 91, American comics artist.
- Luciano Benjamín Menéndez, 90, Argentine military officer, convicted murderer and human rights violator, cardiogenic shock.
- Keith Murdoch, 74, New Zealand rugby union player (Otago, national team).
- Daniel Perlsweig, 91, American racehorse trainer (Lord Avie), awarded Dogwood Dominion Award (1993).
- Prabodh Panda, 72, Indian politician, heart attack.
- Quini, 68, Spanish footballer (Sporting de Gijón, F.C Barcelona, national team), heart attack.
- Hugo Santiago, 78, Argentine film director (Invasión, Écoute voir, The Others) and actor.
- Sandra Stone, 83, American artist.
- Jacqueline Vaudecrane, 104, French figure skater.
- Jan Vercruysse, 69, Belgian artist.

=== 28 ===
- Carlos Bonilla, 63, American lobbyist.
- Chen Xiaolu, 71, Chinese businessman and princeling, heart attack.
- Barry Crimmins, 64, American comedian and social activist, cancer.
- Amand Dalem, 79, Belgian politician, Mayor of Rochefort (1970–1994), Senator (1979–1994), Minister of the Walloon Government (1985–1992), Governor of Namur (1994-2007).
- Kieron Durkan, 44, English footballer (Wrexham, Stockport County, Macclesfield Town).
- Keith English, 50, American politician, member of the Missouri House of Representatives (2013–2017), suicide by gunshot.
- Antonio García-Trevijano, 90, Spanish lawyer, politician, philosopher and anti-Francoist activist.
- Rogelio Guerra, 81, Mexican actor (Mañana es para siempre, Rafaela, Amor Bravío), complications from thrombus.
- Jeff Kowalick, 71, Australian cricketer.
- Stefán Kristjánsson, 35, Icelandic chess grandmaster.
- Andy Lewis, 92, American screenwriter (Klute).
- Lye Siew Weng, 77, Malaysian politician, MLA for Air Itam (1995–2004) and Air Putih (2004–2008), bone cancer.
- Marc L. Marks, 91, American politician, member of the U.S. House of Representatives for Pennsylvania's 24th district (1977–1983).
- Pierre Milza, 85, French historian.
- Albert Mkrtchyan, 81, Armenian theater director, film director, actor, screenwriter.
- Jay R. Moyer, 70, American politician, cancer.
- John Muir, 70, Scottish footballer (St Johnstone, Alloa).
- Ratnavel Pandian, 89, Indian judge, member of the Supreme Court (1988–1994), chief justice of Madras High Court (1988).
- Jayendra Saraswathi, 82, Indian guru, seer of Kanchi Kamakoti Peetham (since 1954).
- Gerhard Scherhorn, 88, German economist.
- Harvey Schmidt, 88, American musical theatre producer and writer (The Fantasticks, 110 in the Shade).
- Naomi Siegmann, 84–85, American artist, pneumonia.
- Ștefan Tașnadi, 64, Romanian weightlifter, Olympic silver medalist (1984).
- William R. Trotter, 74, American author and historian.
- Noble Villeneuve, 79, Canadian politician, MPP (1983–1999).
- Gjert Wilhelmsen, 91, Norwegian shipowner.
