= Pikal =

Pikal is a surname. Notable people with this surname include:

- Michael J. Pikal (1939–2018), American pharmacologist
- Wally Pikal (1927–2017), American musician and entertainer
- Wolfgang Pikal (born 1967), Austrian football manager
