= James Aitchison =

James Aitchison may refer to:

- James Aitchison (cricketer) (1920–1994), Scottish first class cricketer
- James H. Aitchison (1908–1994), Canadian academic and politician
- James Edward Tierney Aitchison (1836–1898), Scottish surgeon and botanist
