= FPDA =

FPDA may refer to:

- Feminist post-structuralist discourse analysis, a method of discourse analysis
- Five Power Defence Arrangements, a series of defence relationships established by a series of bilateral agreements between the United Kingdom, Australia, New Zealand, Malaysia and Singapore
- Flexible Premium Deferred Annuity, a type of life annuity where multiple premiums may be made in the deferral period
