= Mudzingwa =

Mudzingwa is a Zimbabwean surname. Notable people with the surname include:

- Florence Mudzingwa, Zimbabwean disability rights activist, social enterprise founder and writer
- Gochomu J. Mudzingwa (1916–2018), Zimbabwean traditional leader
- Tichaona Mudzingwa (died 2012), Zimbabwean politician
