= Caroline Brown =

Caroline Brown may refer to:

- Caroline Brown (bowls) (born 1980), Scottish bowler
- Caroline Brown (cellist) (1953–2018), English cellist
- Caroline Brown, pseudonym of American author Caroline Virginia Krout (1852–1931)

== See also ==
- Carolyn Brown (disambiguation)
- Carrie Brown (disambiguation)
