= Feminist post-structuralist discourse analysis =

Method of discourse analysis

Feminist post-structuralist discourse analysis (FPDA) is a method of discourse analysis based on Chris Weedon's theories of feminist post-structuralism, and developed as a method of analysis by Judith Baxter in 2003. FPDA is based on a combination of feminism and post-structuralism. While it is still evolving as a methodology, FPDA has been used by a range of international scholars of gender and language to analyse texts such as: classroom discourse (Castañeda-Peña 2008; Sauntson 2012), teenage girls' conversation (Kamada 2008; 2010), and media representations of gender (Baker 2013). FPDA is an approach to analysing the discourse of spoken interaction principally.

The post-structuralist part of FPDA views language as social practice and considers that people's identities and relationships are 'performed' through spoken interaction. FPDA analyses the ways in which speakers are 'positioned' by different and often competing 'discourses' according to Michel Foucault's (1972: 49) definition as 'practices that systematically form the objects of which they speak'. According to this, speakers constantly move between powerful and powerless 'subject positions' as they talk and interact. FPDA is influenced by a poststructuralist rather than a Critical Discourse Analysis (CDA) perspective: that is, the method is informed by the view that no speaker is wholly a victim and powerless, nor wholly dominant and powerful. Rather, speakers are constantly shifting their subject positions according to the interplay of discourses within specific settings. The feminist part of FPDA considers gender difference to be a dominant discourse among competing discourses when analysing all types of text. According to Baxter (2003), FPDA does not have an 'emancipatory' agenda for women but a 'transformative' one. This means that it aims to represent women's voices that have been 'silenced' or marginalised since FPDA considers that these have been historically absent in many cultures. For example, Kamada (2008a; 2008b and 2010) uses FPDA to show how a friendship group of half-Japanese girls, who are seen by their culture as 'less than whole', draw upon competing discourses to negotiate more positive versions of their 'hybrid' ethnic and gender identities.

== Background ==
The above definition of FPDA developed from the ideas of the formalist, Mikhail Bakhtin (1981)] and the poststructuralist thinkers Jacques Derrida (1987)] and Michel Foucault (1972) in relation to power, knowledge and discourses. It is also based on the feminist work of Victorial Bergvall (1998)], Judith Butler (1990), Bronwyn Davies (1997), Valerie Walkerdine (1990)] and especially Chris Weedon (1997). Adopters of FPDA include Judith Baxter in the analysis of classroom talk and business meeting interactions; Laurel Kamada (2008; 2008; 2010) in the analysis of 'hybrid' identities of half-Japanese girls, Harold Castañeda-Peña (2008) in the examination of pupils in an EFL classroom in Brazil; Helen Sauntson in the analysis of UK secondary school classroom talk; and Paul Baker(2013) in the study of newspaper representations of predatory women. FPDA is based on the following principles, which continue to be discussed and debated by scholars:

- Discourse as social practice (rather than, or additional to, 'language above the sentence' or as 'language in use' (Cameron, 2001)
- The performative (rather than the essentialist or possessive) nature of speakers' identities; gender is something people enact or do, not something they are or characterise (Butler 1990)
- The diversity and multiplicity of speakers' identities: thus, gender is just one of many cultural variables constructing speakers' identities (e.g. regional background, ethnicity, class, age), though it is still viewed as potentially highly significant
- The construction of meaning within localised or context-specific settings or communities of practice such as classrooms, board meetings, TV talk shows
- An interest in deconstruction: working out how binary power relations (e.g. males/females, public/private, objective/subjective) constitute identities, subject positions and interactions within discourses and texts, and challenging such binaries
- Inter-discursivity: recognising ways in which one discourse is always inscribed and inflected with traces of other discourses, or how one text is interwoven with another
- The need for continuous self-reflexivity: being continuously explicit and questioning about the values and assumptions made by discourse analysis.

== See also ==
- Post-structuralism
- Discourse
- Critical Discourse Analysis
- Feminism
- Feminist theory
