= Kerry Brown =

Kerry Brown may refer to:

- Kerry Brown (American football) (born 1985), American football guard
- Kerry Brown (wrestler) (1958–2009), Canadian professional wrestler
- Kerry Brown (musician) (born 1963), American drummer for the band Catherine and producer of The Smashing Pumpkins
- Kerry Brown (historian) (born 1967), British academic, director of the Lau China Institute at King's College, London

== See also ==
- Carrie Brown (disambiguation)
