= Des Moroney =

Canadian-Swedish ice hockey player

- Born: February 15, 1935; Sudbury, Ontario, Canada
- Died: February 11, 2018 (aged 82); Skivarp, Skurup, Sweden
- Height: 5 ft 10 in (178 cm)
- Weight: 170 lb (77 kg; 12 st 2 lb)
- Position: Right wing
- Shot: Left
- Played for: Philadelphia Ramblers (EHL); Paisley Pirates (BNL); Toledo Mercurys (IHL); Minneapolis Millers (IHL); Portland Buckaroos (WHL); Omaha Knights (IHL); Fagersta AIK (SHL-2); Leksands IF (SHL); Rögle BK (SHL-3, SHL-2); Västerås IK (SHL); Tingsryds AIF (SHL); Örebro IK (SHL); Karlskrona IK (SHL-2); Värnamo GIK (SHL-4)
- Playing career: 1955–1980

Desmond Joseph Moroney (February 15, 1935 – February 11, 2018) was a Canadian/Swedish professional ice hockey player. Moroney played in North American minor leagues like the Eastern Hockey League, International Hockey League and the Western Hockey League. He also played in Europe, in the British National League and the Swedish Hockey League. His professional career lasted from 1955 through 1980.

== Ice hockey career ==
Moroney played junior ice hockey for the St. Michael's Buzzers and the Toronto St. Michael's Majors from 1952 to 1954. He joined the Barrie Flyers in 1955, and later moved to the Philadelphia Ramblers of the Eastern Hockey League while still a junior. He then attended Michigan State University for two years.

In 1959, Moroney moved to England to play for the Paisley Pirates of the British National League for the 1959–60 season, where he was named to the British National League First All-Star Team. He returned to North America in 1960, joining the Minneapolis Millers of the International Hockey League. After the 1961–62 season spent between Minneapolis, Omaha and Toledo, Moroney moved to Sweden, which he had heard had "fun hockey."

Moroney played the rest of his career in various levels of the Swedish pro hockey system. He first played for Fagersta AIK in 1962–63, then played for Leksands IF, Rögle BK, Lunds IS, Västerås IK, Tingsryds AIF, Örebro IK and Karlskrona IK before retiring in 1978. He returned for a final season in 1979–80 with Värnamo GIK before retiring for good. For several of the teams, Moroney served as playing coach.

== Personal life ==
Moroney married twice and is the father of two daughters and a son. He lived in Skivarp, Sweden, with his wife Margreth. After hockey, Moroney worked as a gym teacher.
