= Carrie Brown =

Carrie Brown may refer to:

- Carrie Brown (murder victim) (1834–1891), murdered New York prostitute, once suggested as a murder victim of Jack the Ripper
- Carrie Brown (author) (born 1959), American novelist and professor
- Carrie Budoff Brown, American journalist and news editor
- Carrie Brown, sports correspondent on Al Jazeera English
- "Carrie Brown", song from The Mountain (Steve Earle album)

== See also ==
- Kerry Brown (disambiguation)
- Caroline Brown (disambiguation)
- Carolyn Brown (disambiguation)
- Kerrie Brown, set decorator
