= Carolyn Brown =

Carolyn Brown may refer to:

- Carolyn Brown (choreographer) (1927–2025), American dancer, choreographer and writer
- Carolyn Brown (newsreader), BBC Radio 4 newsreader and continuity announcer
- Carolyn Brown (author) (born 1948), American novelist
- Carolyn Tener Brown (born 1960), American ballet coach
- Carolyn J. Brown (born 1961), Canadian geneticist

== See also ==
- Caroline Brown (disambiguation)
- Carrie Brown (disambiguation)
