= Ax the Tax =

Anti-tax organization in Florida

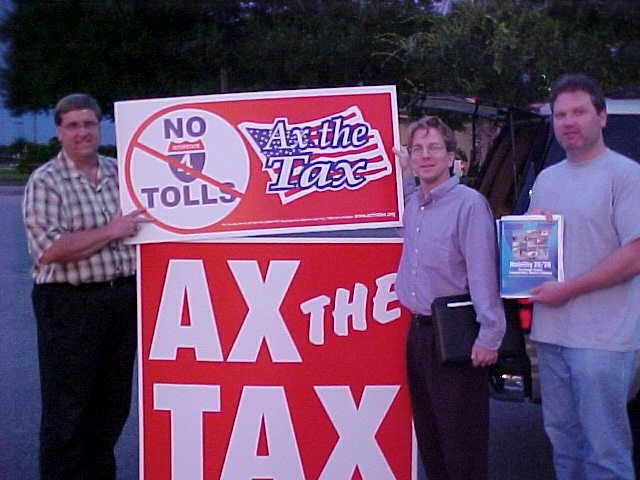
Ax the Tax rally

Ax the Tax is a citizens group in Florida that leads efforts throughout the state against proposed tax increases for various projects it deems as wasteful government spending. The organization is credited with defeating as much as $47.5 billion in proposed taxes since it began in 1982, although critics say some of the tax initiatives the group fought against would have been defeated anyway.

Ax the Tax was founded by Doug Guetzloe, a political consultant and owner of a public relations and marketing firm. He has led the organization to 17 successful anti-tax battles. Guetzloe has been described as having “a sharp sense of humor, an acerbic tongue and a populist message,” according to a reporter for the Orlando Sentinel, which “has built Ax the Tax into a small but highly motivated grass-roots force.” Opponents of the organization claim its anti-tax crusades have taken funding away for environmental lands, schools and roads, but supporters have described many of the tax proposals as “boondoggles,” including multibillion-dollar rail projects that have been rejected by Florida voters four times.

The organization was formed following an attempt to construct a downtown Orlando sports arena in 1982 at a cost of $110 million with a sales tax increase. The tax proposal was rejected by 62 percent of the voters. Among the group’s other victories was the defeat of an $8.8 billion road and transportation plan in Orange County in 2003. The group’s effort to defeat an education tax a year earlier failed. Ax the Tax helped in defeating property and sales tax increases in Orange, Seminole, Osceola, Leon, and Broward counties, forming Ax the Tax affiliates in those areas.

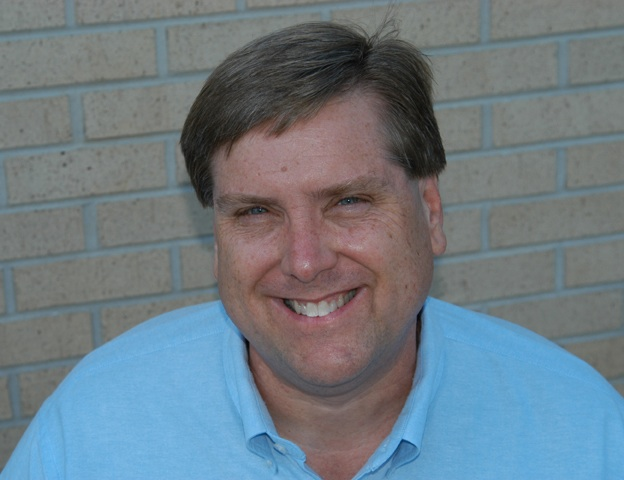
Doug Guetzloe, Ax the Tax Founder
