= Judith Baxter =

British sociolinguist

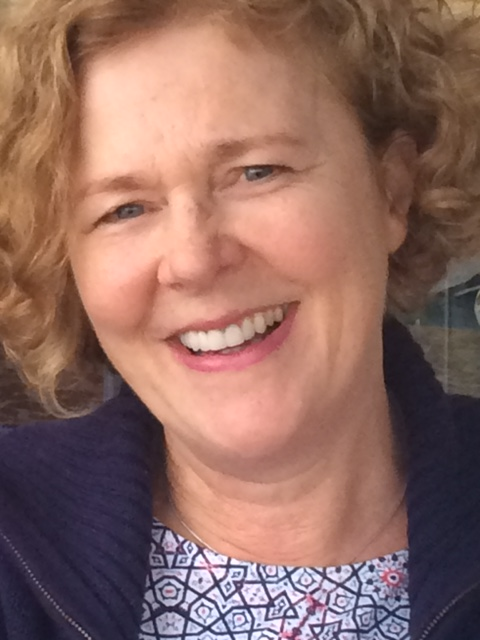
Judith Baxter

Judith Baxter (1955 – 24 February 2018) was a British sociolinguist and Professor of Applied linguistics at Aston University where she specialised in Gender and Language, and Leadership Language. She served in editorial positions with several academic journals.

== Education ==
Baxter graduated from the University of East Anglia in 1976 with a BA honours degree in English Literature. She then gained a Postgraduate Certificate in Education (PGCE) at the University of Cambridge. While working as a teacher, she studied for a part-time MSc degree in Educational Studies at the University of Surrey. She conducted three years of PhD research at University of Reading under the supervision of the sociolinguist, Professor Viv Edwards while lecturing there in English in Education. Her thesis, entitled 'Teaching Girls to Speak Out' was a study of the extent to which gender is a pertinent discourse for understanding girls' and boys' spoken interactions in classroom contexts.

== Career ==
Following an initial career as an English teacher in a UK comprehensive school and then a sixth form college, Baxter joined the Department of Education at Reading University in 1993. During this time, she was also a freelance editor for Cambridge University Press, editing two series of literature for schools: Cambridge Literature for Schools and the Wildfire series of Women's Literature. After gaining her PhD in 2000, she wrote a monograph Positioning gender in discourse: A feminist methodology. In 2005, she was appointed Lecturer of English Language in the Applied Linguistics department at Reading University, and in 2009 moved to a senior lecturer post at Aston University. She was promoted to Reader in 2012, and in the same year, was awarded a Chair in Applied Linguistics.

Baxter's research specialism is the relationship between language, gender and leadership in educational, business and professional contexts. From 2010 to 2012, she directed a UK Research Council project entitled 'Leadership Talk and Gender in Senior Management Business Meetings in the UK She pioneered the method feminist post-structuralist discourse analysis (FPDA), now used by scholars around the world. FPDA is a method of discourse analysis of spoken interactions principally, based on Chris Weedon's theories of feminism and poststructuralism.

Baxter worked extensively with chief executives, MPs, the police and business women's networks presenting her research and delivering workshops on the significance of effective language use to women's career progression. Her research has regularly featured in the press and the media including the BBC2 series, Women at the Top and BBC Radio programmes such as Woman's Hour and Business Daily.

Baxter spoke about gender and leadership talk at the TEDxAston University on 17 May 2013.

== Selected bibliography ==
Baxter's academic publications include:

=== Books ===
- Baxter, J. (2017) Women Leaders and Gender Stereotyping in the UK Press: A Poststructuralist Approach, London: Springer
- Baxter, J. (2014) Double-voicing: Power, Gender and Linguistic Expertise. Basingstoke: Palgrave Macmillan ISBN 978-1-137-34852-4.
- Baxter, J. (2010) The Language of Female Leadership. Basingstoke: Palgrave Macmillan ISBN 978-140399788-3.
- Baxter, J. (ed.) (2006) Speaking Out: The Female Voice in Public Contexts. Basingstoke: Palgrave Macmillan ISBN 9781403994073
- Baxter, J. (2003) Positioning Gender in Discourse: A Feminist Methodology. Basingstoke: Palgrave ISBN 9780333986356

=== Book chapters ===
- Baxter, J. (2015) 'Heteroglossia.' In Tracy, K., Ilie, C. & Sandel, T. (eds.) The International Encyclopaedia of Language and Social Interaction, pp. 734–745. Boston: John Wiley & Sons.
- Baxter, J. (2015) ‘Leadership discourse.’ In Tracy, K., Ilie, C. & Sandel, T. (eds.) The International Encyclopaedia of Language and Social Interaction, pp. 953–962. Boston: John Wiley & Sons.
- Baxter, J. (2015) ‘Feminist Poststructuralist Discourse Analysis’ In Tracy, K., Ilie, C. & Sandel, T. (eds.) The International Encyclopaedia of Language and Social Interaction, pp. 613–618. Boston: John Wiley & Sons.
- Baxter, J. (2012) ‘Feminist research.’ In C.A. Chapelle (ed.) The Encyclopaedia of Applied Linguistics. Oxford: Blackwell Publishing.
- Baxter, J. (2011) ‘Language and gender’ in J. Simpson (ed.) The Handbook of Applied Linguistics. London: Routledge.
- Baxter, J. (2010) 'Discourse-analytic approaches to text and talk'. In L. Litosseliti (ed.) Research Methods in Linguistics. London: Continuum.
- Baxter, J. (2008) ‘Feminist Post-structuralist Discourse Analysis: a new theoretical and methodological approach?’ In J. Sunderland et al. Theoretical and Methodological Approaches to Gender and Language Study. Basingstoke: Palgrave, pp. 243–55.
- Baxter, J. (2007) ‘Post-structuralist Analysis of Classroom Discourse.’ In M. Martin-Jones & A.M. de Mejia, Encyclopaedia of Language and Education: Discourse and Education, Vol 3. New York: Springer, pp. 69 – 80 (refereed).

=== Journal articles ===
- Baxter, J. (2014), ' 'If you had only listened carefully...': the discursive construction of emerging leadership in a UK all-women management team'. Discourse and Communication, vol 8, no. 1, pp. 23–39., doi: 10.1177/1750481313503224
- Baxter, J. (2014), ' Who wants to be the leader? The discursive construction of emerging leadership in differently gendered teams ' Journal of Business Communication, vol Published online before print., doi: 10.1177/2329488414525460
- Baxter, J. & Al-A'ali, H. (2014), ' 'Your situation is critical...': the discursive enactment of leadership by business women in Middle Eastern and Western European contexts ' Gender and Language, vol 8, no. 1, pp. 91–116., doi: 10.1558/genl.v8i1.91
- Baxter, J. (2012) ‘Women of the Corporation: a sociolinguistic perspective of senior women’s leadership language in the UK.’ Journal of Sociolinguistics, 16(1): 81- 107; doi: 10.1111/j.1467-9841.2011.00520.x
- Baxter, J. (2011) ‘Survival or success?: A critical exploration of the use of ‘double-voiced discourse’ by women business leaders in the UK.’ Discourse and Communication, 5 (3): pp. 231 – 245; doi: 10.1177/1750481311405590
- Baxter, J. and Wallace, K. (2009) ‘‘I’m not going to talk to whatever her name is’: Constructing professional identities through male solidarity and female exclusion in builders’ discourse.’ Discourse & Society 20 (4): 411–29; doi: 10.1177/0957926509104021
- Baxter, J. (2008) Is it all tough talking at the top? A post-structuralist analysis of the construction of gendered speaker identities of British business leaders within interview narratives. Gender and Language, Vol 2 (2): 193 – 218; doi: 10.1558/genl.v2i2.197
