= Marian Czachor =

Polish footballer (1924–2018)

Personal information
- Date of birth: 8 December 1924
- Place of birth: Radom, Russian Empire
- Date of death: 15 February 2018 (aged 93)
- Place of death: Radom, Poland
- Position: Left winger

Senior career*
Years	Team	Apps	(Gls)
–1945	SKS Radom		
1945–1958	Radomiak Radom		

International career
1947	Poland	1	(0)
- * Club domestic league appearances and goals

Marian Czachor (8 December 1924 – 15 February 2018) was a Polish footballer who played as a left winger.

He played in one match for the Poland national team in 1947.
