= Jeff Kowalick =

Australian cricketer (1946–2018)

Personal information
- Full name: Jeffrey Peter Kowalick
- Born: 22 July 1946; Maylands, South Australia
- Died: 28 February 2018 (aged 71); Oakbank, South Australia
- Batting: Left-handed
- Bowling: Right-arm fast-medium
- Role: Bowler

Domestic team information
- Years: Team
- 1966/67: South Australia

Career statistics
| Competition | First-class |
|---|---|
| Matches | 1 |
| Runs scored | 0 |
| Batting average | – |
| 100s/50s | 0/0 |
| Top score | 0* |
| Balls bowled | 112 |
| Wickets | 1 |
| Bowling average | 88.00 |
| 5 wickets in innings | 0 |
| 10 wickets in match | 0 |
| Best bowling | 1/58 |
| Catches/stumpings | 0/– |
- Source: Cricinfo, 27 September 2025

Jeffrey Peter Kowalick (22 July 1946 – 28 February 2018) was an Australian cricketer. He played in one first-class match for South Australia in 1966/67. He later became a cricket coach.
