= Skivarp =

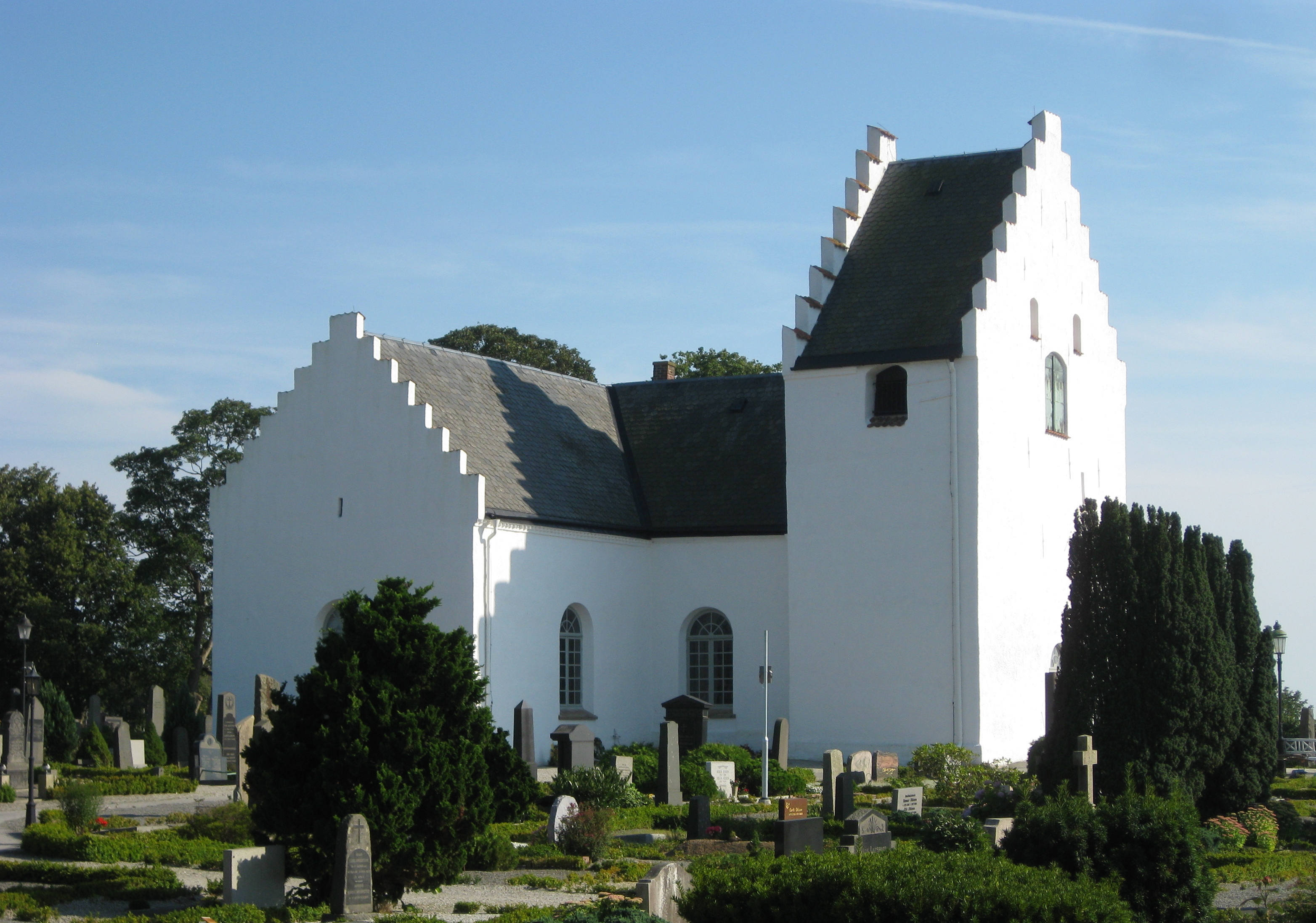
- Skivarp Church

- Location within Skåne Location within Sweden
- Coordinates: 55°25.4′N 13°34.2′E
- Country: Sweden
- Province: Skåne
- County: Skåne County
- Municipality: Skurup Municipality

Area
  - Total: 1.26 km^{2} (0.49 sq mi)

Population (31 December 2010)
  - Total: 1,257
  - Density: 998/km^{2} (2,580/sq mi)
- Time zone: UTC+1 (CET)
  - Summer (DST): UTC+2 (CEST)
- Postal code: 274 5x
- Area code: 0411
- Website: www.skivarpsbyalag.se

Skivarp is a locality situated in Skurup Municipality, Skåne County, Sweden with 1,257 inhabitants in 2010.
