= Bibi Ballandi =

Italian television producer (1946–2018)

- Born: 26 June 1946; Baricella, Italy
- Died: 15 February 2018 (aged 71); Imola, Italy
- Occupations: Television producer; manager
- Years active: ca. 1970-2018

Bibi Ballandi (26 June 1946 – 15 February 2018) was an Italian television producer.

He worked as a manager for numerous artists, including singers such as Al Bano, Mina, Little Tony, Rita Pavone, Orietta Berti, Nicola Di Bari and Caterina Caselli in the 1960s, and later worked with Fabrizio De André, Lucio Dalla, Francesco De Gregori and Roberto Vecchioni.

In 1983 he founded the "Bandiera Gialla" nightclub in Rimini. Then, he became a television producer and started a collaboration with RAI. He produced such television programs as Ballando con le Stelle and Ti lascio una canzone.

== Biography ==
The son of Iso, a former taxi driver who began accompanying singers and orchestras around Emilia-Romagna, he dropped out of school after finishing the eighth grade and became a self-made manager of various artists, first for pleasure, later professionally. In the 1960s he worked alongside Al Bano, Orietta Berti, Nicola Di Bari, Caterina Caselli, Mina, Little Tony, and Rita Pavone, while in the 1970s he collaborated with Lucio Dalla, Francesco De Gregori, Fabrizio De André, Roberto Vecchioni, Pierangelo Bertoli, and a fledgling Vasco Rossi.

In 1983 he was among the founders of the Bandiera gialla disco in Rimini. He later became a television producer with his company Ballandi Multimedia, beginning a collaboration with RAI and then continuing it with other Italian television publishers. He produced many successful television programs of the 1980s, 1990s, and 2000s, notably the one-man shows of Rosario Fiorello, Adriano Celentano, Gianni Morandi, Giorgio Panariello, and Massimo Ranieri, the Saturday night variety shows Ballando con le stelle and Ti lascio una canzone, and other television events of musical and non-musical entertainment.

Suffering from Colorectal cancer for about 12 years, he died at age 71 in Imola on Feb. 15, 2018.

Il direttore generale della Rai Mario Orfeo, in accordo con la presidente Monica Maggioni, a seguito della sua morte suggerì di intitolargli il Teatro delle Vittorie di Rome ma la proposta non ebbe compimento.

== Death ==
He died on 15 February 2018 in Imola, Italy, aged 71, following a long battle with colorectal cancer.
