= Susan Wood (visual artist) =

Canadian artist & educator (1953–2018)

Susan Wood (1953–2018) was a Canadian artist and educator.

== Biography ==
Born in Saint John, New Brunswick, and grew up in Amherst, Nova Scotia. She received a Bachelor of Fine Arts from Mount Allison University in 1967 before attending the 1976–1977 Banff Winter Studio Program. In 1981, she received a Master of Fine Arts from the University of Calgary.

Susan Wood was a founding member of Eastern Edge Gallery, St. John's, Newfoundland and Labrador. She taught at NSCAD from 1990 to 2012.

In 2018, Visual Arts Nova Scotia announced the Susan Wood Award to support an emerging artist from Nova Scotia. The annual award was established to honour Wood's "legacy as a dedicated visual artist, mentor, and friend."

== Career ==
Susan Wood was known for drawings rooted in the principles of observational drawing on handmade Japanese papers (washi).

== Collections ==
- Owens Art Gallery, Mount Allison University
- Mount Saint Vincent University Art Gallery
- Art Gallery of Nova Scotia
- Dalhousie Art Gallery
- Canada Council Art Bank
- NS Art Bank

== Major exhibitions & awards ==
- Member of the Royal Canadian Academy of Arts
- Recipient of grant awards from the Canada Council for the Arts, the Newfoundland and Labrador Arts Council and the Nova Scotia Arts Council.
- Touring Solo Exhibition: Taxonomies (1999)
- Touring Solo Exhibition: Earth Skins at Mount Saint Vincent University Art Gallery (August 23 – October 2, 2011), Owens Art Gallery, Mount Allison University (January 13 – February 26, 2012), Acadia University Art Gallery (June 18 – August 11, 2012), The Rooms Provincial Art Gallery (September 8 – November 18, 2012).
