= La Saga de los Confines =

Fantasy novel series

Saga of the Borderlands (Spanish: La Saga de los Confines) is a collection of three fantasy novels, written by Argentine writer Liliana Bodoc. The first book, The Days of the Deer, was published in 2000, the second one The Days of Shadow arrived in 2002 and the third and last one, The Days of Fire, hit the bookstores in 2004. This work takes form in the epic fantasy genre and it takes place in an imaginary world called The Fertile Lands (Tierras Fertiles). The main plot of the saga revolves around the Fertile Lands' people's struggle against the armies of evil Misaianes, from The Ancient Lands.

The whole trilogy functions as a reinterpretation of the "Conquista de América" ( the Conquest of Pre-Columbian America by the Spanish, Portuguese and other Europeans) and the consequences it brought to their native inhabitants, through the lens of Epic Fantasy, allowing for an ending different to the Historical one, as forces of Nature and Magic come into play.

An English translation of The Days of the Deer was published in August 2013 by Atlantic Books.

== Plot ==
In the Ends of the Earth, the southern end of the Fertile Lands, lives the Husihuilkes people, one of them is Dulkancellin, a warrior and father of a large family. He is called to represent his people at a Council meeting in the distant city of Beleram. Magical and ancient manuscripts speak of the arrival of men from across the sea, and speak of wicked Misáianes, son of the Death and the "Eternal Hatred". When the meeting finally occurs, the war comes to the Fertile Lands and its inhabitants should defend not only their land, but their entire way of living.

== World and history ==
The saga takes place in a world with two main continents. The Fertile Lands and the Ancient Lands, that are analogous to the "New World" and "Old World".

The Fertile Lands

A continent inspired in the pre-Columbian Americas, the Fertile Lands are characterized by being rich in natural resources, with lots of forests and grasslands. The humans living there have varied cultures and technological developments, but for the most part live in harmony with nature.

The peoples living in the Fertile Lands are inspired by the native cultures of America. They include:

- Husihuilkes: a culture of hunters and farmers who lives in the southern corner of the continent, the husihuilkes are inspired by South American tribes like the Guarani. Formidable warriors who live in mostly egalitarian clans, they may not have the architectural achievements of other cultures from the Fertile Lands, but are still civilized and fair.
- Zitzahays: the Zitzahay are a northern culture inspired by Central American civilization like the Mayans and Aztec. Zitzahay are a pacifist culture that values arts and knowledge highly. They live in cities, celebrate elaborate festivals and have temples with observatories so astronomers can study the skies. To reach adulthood, zitzahay men have to compose a song that they will sing and that will accompany them for the rest of their lives, whose lyrics they must rearrange to reflect their feelings or stage in life at the moment (they're not allowed to change the words of the song, only their place in the sentence). Their most important city is Beleram, home of the House of the Stars, and astronomy temple.
- Lords of the Sun: a culture inspired by the Inca, the Country of the Sun is an Empire with a very strict hierarchy, with aristocrats (the aforementioned Lords of the Sun), peasants and slaves. Their ruling class is arrogant and cunning, with noble families often conspiring against each other, they also treat their slaves harshly, have very rigid traditions and rituals (including human sacrifice), and do not mingle with people from other cultures. Technologically, they're at the same level as the Zitzahay, but their architecture is more opulent and their culture more militaristic.
- Desert Shepherds: a culture inspired by the native inhabitants of the Cuyo region of south America and the southern Andes, the Shepherds live in the arid and mountainous region of the centre of the continent, their main characteristic being their cattle, a creature called "llamel", inspired by llamas and alpacas. In the first book they betray the alliance formed to combat the invasion, but later repent and join them after a big defeat. Although they're rural folk, the Desert Shepherds can be considered an in between culture, more complex than the egalitarian and pragmatic Husihuilkes of the South, but more simple than the northern city-states of the Lords of the Sun and the Zitzahay.
- The Boreas: inspired by the Vikings who briefly explored North America, the Boreas are people who escaped the Ancient Lands centuries ago and now live in the most northern corners of the continent. Their skin and hair color are lighter than the natives of the Fertile Lands, and keep a rich oral tradition regarding their sea-faring ancestors. After the first invasion, a large contingent of Boreas people constructed ships for the first time in centuries, and traveled back to the Ancient Lands to help the remaining free folk of that continent in their fight against Misaianes.
- The Owl Clan: the Owl Clan are mysterious folks who live in another plane of existence but can travel to the human world, they know Misaianes could be a threat to them if he conquers the Fertile Lands, but are of little help beyond their knowledge of the world's ancient history. Time moves differently on their plane and they may be immortal, or at least have a considerably longer lifespan than regular humans.

The Ancient Lands

A continent inspired by 15th century Europe, the Ancient Lands are a barren wasteland controlled almost in its entirety by the followers of Misaianes, a small population of wizards and aristocrats who rule over a vast array of slaves who are forbidden from even having names.

The Brotherhood of the Recint and the Brotherhood of the Open Air

Centuries, or even millennia before the main events of the novels, there was a rift between the wizards of the Ancient Lands. Some wizards wanted to guard the knowledge of magic from the other beings who inhabit the world (regular humans, animals, etc.) with the objective of guarding them in a distant and paternalistic manner, while other wizards wanted to share the knowledge and be more close and open to the non-magical beings. The former stay on close door temples and academies forming what became known as the "Brotherhood of the Recint", while the later stayed away from dogmatic institutions becoming the "Brotherhood of the Open Air" because they worked and studied outdoors. Because of the inherent elitism in the Brotherhood of the Recint's philosophy and doctrine, Misaianes was able to corrupt them and they became their servants, while the Brotherhood of the Open Air escaped to the Fertile Lands.

It's worth to mention that in Spanish, the author uses different words for the wizards in the Fertile Lands and in the Ancient Lands: the Fertile Land ones are "brujos" (who could be translated as "witch"/"witcher") while the ones from the Ancient Lands are "magos" ("magicians" or "mages"). The intention was clearly to differentiate the folksy and mystical nature of the Fertile Land wizards against the more academic and structured nature of the Ancient Land wizards.

== Characters ==
=== Dulkancellin's family ===
Dulkancellin: The main character. He the representative of the Husihuilke clan. A mighty warrior, he serves as the protagonist for the first book. An archetypical noble warrior, Dulkancellin has a simple life and values highly the traditions of his people. Although disapproving of some aspects of the other cultures of his continent, he's empathetic and does everything in his power to fend off the invaders.

Shampalwe: Dulkancellin's wife. She died the day Wilkilén was born. Kuy-Kuyen's daughter is named after her.

Thungür: Dulkancellin's older son. A great warrior in the making, much like his father. He's brave and honorable, but also intelligent and very aware that the traditional way his people has fought wars in the past will not be enough to defeat their invaders, and new weapons, strategies and ways of thinking will be necessary for the continent's survival. In the second and third book he also falls in love with a princess from the Lords of the Sun.

Kume: Dulkancellin's second son. A quiet and sad boy. He struggles to win the respect of his father, and is the first to understand how their enemy's weapons work but, unable to convince Dulkancellin of taking a more tactical approach to fight the war, he ends up sacrificing himself to blow up the gunpowder reservoir.

Kuy-Kuyen: Dulkancellin's third born child. His first daughter. In the second book, in the years of peace between the first and second wave of invasions, she married Cucub and had children, becoming a very competent matriarch, pragmatic but loving.

Piukemán: Dulkancellin's youngest son. Is very inquisitive and ends up witnessing a forbidden magical ritual, which in the later books results forces him to become a wizard.

Wilkilén: Dulkancellin's youngest daughter. In the second book it is revealed that she is mentally challenged, remaining with the intellect and maturity of a child for the rest of her life.

Kush: Dulkancellin's mother. A very wise old woman.

Cucub: A man of a race called Zitzahay, he is an artists and he's starts the story as a comic relief. Renowned as a great storyteller, he's tasked to personally deliver Dulkancellin's invitation to the Council. Dulkancellin find's him annoying at first, but his opinion softens a little after a while. At the end of The Days of Deer he marries Kuy-Kuyen and later they have a lot of children. Cucub has a very cheerful and extroverted personality, being a singer and storyteller from a culture that values artistic expression very highly, and although not a violent person, he's brave and can fend from himself in a battle. He also becomes very good at horse-riding (horses being a new in the continent, brought from the Ancient Lands during their first invasion).

=== Wizards and magical creatures ===
The ones who bring magic to the Fertile Lands, which is one of the most important elements in the story, the wizards are not entirely human. The main wizard is named Kupuka, and his loyal friends The Chewer, The Falcon Wizard, The Little Father of Step, Three Faces and Welenkín.

Kupuka the de facto leader of the wizards, Kupuka is known and beloved by the Husihuilke peoples because he often travels the land helping them and giving wisdom, serving a role similar to Gandalf in the story. His appearance is often compared to a goat.

The Chewer an expert in potions, the Chewer gets his name for his supernatural ability of eating all sort of plants, including venomous ones. He's very cranky, does not like to interact with people and has negative predisposition that puts him at odds with the Little Father, but will still always help when someone is in need.

The Little Father of the Step a wise and cheerful wizard, the Little Father of the Step is comparable to an engineer or artificer, as he often invents contraptions to help the people near the mountains where he lives. Once the war start, he's the one who studies and ends up replicating the invader's gunpowder.

Welenkín described as a beautiful man with golden hair, and maybe golden skin, Welenkín can communicate with animals and shapeshift into a mountain lion. Wilkilén is in love with him.

Three Faces the son of a fisherman and a mermaid-like creature, Three Faces has powers related to water and his name comes from the fact that his face is only capable of three expressions: happiness (when his skin lift his mouth, nose and eyes up), sadness (when his mouth, nose and eyes go down), and confusion (an in-between state with some factions up and others down).

The Falcon Wizard after being cursed with the vision of the Ahijador Falcon as punishment for witnessing a sacred ritual no ordinary human should see, Piukemán becomes the fifth wizard, slowly metamorphosing into a bird-like creature. The curse consists of losing his own eyesight, instead watching whatever the Ahijador Falcon sees, this creature is a giant and vicious falcon who delights in killing animals to torture those affected with the curse. But the curse also links the minds of Piukemán and the predator, so he can eventually forge an understanding with it by virtue of his determination and willpower.

=== Other characters ===
Bor and Zabralkán the two main astronomers of the city of Beleram, they foretell the danger approaching their continent. Although not possessing any magical abilities, they have the mystic knowledge of how the world works, and therefore belong tho the same Brotherhood of Open Air like the wizards.

Nanahuatli a young princess of the Country of the Sun, she and Thungür fall in love, something Molitzmós uses to manipulate her half-brother, the ruling prince, and ultimately seize power. After being sentenced to die in a sacrifice, Nanahuatli scapes her city during an invasion and pillaging by enemy forces, which leads her to a hard and perilous journey across the continent, in which she meets Thungür's family and sort-of befriends the Falcon Wizard.

Molitzmós: a traitor from the Fertile Lands, Molitzmos is an ambitious and manipulative aristocrat from the Country of the Sun. He becomes the Country's king after killing his predecessor in a coup aided by Sideresius soldiers.

Acila: an old noblewoman from the Country of the Sun, who becomes one of Molitzmós wives. Very intelligent and cunning, she tries to restore her family's position after being the only survivor of Molitzmós coup.

Illán-che-ñe: a desert shepherd and traitor who tries to sabotage the Fertile Land's efforts to prepare for the invasion.

=== The Ancient Lands ===
Misaianes: The main antagonist in the entire saga, a being representing a hungering void, who wants to conquer the Fertile Lands. He was spawned when Death ignored the prohibition of never giving birth to a child of her own.

The Death: The mother of Misaianes. She spawned him out of loneliness, since she was feared and reviled by all living beings just for doing her job.

The Sideresius: the foot soldiers of Misaianes, the Sideresius are brutish and ruthless. An army conformed by creatures of different races (including but not limited to humans) that have lived in oppression during centuries, this soldiers are stripped of any individuality and only know hate, cruelty and some grade of military discipline.

Drimus: An evil wizard who serves Misaianes as a prophet of his greatness in the fertile lands. Serves as a more practical antagonist than his master.

Zorás: the last wizard of the Brotherhood of the Recint who opposes Misaianes. He's introduced in the third book along with his only apprentice, Foitetés. Zorás fathers two magical children with a slaved woman and leaves them with the free folk of the Ancient Continent so they can start a slave revolt when they're older.
