= Derek Kinne =

Derek Godfrey Kinne
- Born: 11 January 1931; Nottingham, England
- Died: 6 February 2018 (aged 87); Tucson, Arizona, United States
- Military career
- Allegiance: United Kingdom
- Branch: British Army
- Service years: 1948–1954
- Rank: Fusilier
- Unit: Royal Northumberland Fusiliers
- Conflicts: Korean War: Battle of the Imjin River
- Awards: George Cross

Derek Godfrey Kinne, GC (11 January 1931 – 6 February 2018) was a British Army soldier who awarded the George Cross for the valour he showed in withstanding torture at the hands of the Chinese Communist forces during the Korean War.

Kinne was serving with the Royal Northumberland Fusiliers when he was taken prisoner by the Chinese on the last day of the Battle of Imjin River on 25 April 1951. He escaped twice, the first time within a day of his capture, and was held in solitary confinement in ever more brutal conditions as a result of his unbreakable defiance. His final period of punishment was for wearing a rosette to celebrate Queen Elizabeth II's coronation. He was eventually released, in a prisoner exchange, on 10 August 1953.

== Citation ==
Notice of his award was published in the London Gazette on 9 April 1954.—

22105517 Fusilier Derek Godfrey Kinne, The Royal Northumberland Fusiliers.

In August, 1950, Fusilier Kinne volunteered for service in Korea. He joined the 1st Battalion, The Royal Northumberland Fusiliers, and was captured by Chinese Communist forces on the 25th April, 1951, the last day of the Imjin River battle. From then on he had only two objects in mind; firstly to escape, and secondly by his contempt for his captors and their behaviour, and his utter disregard for the treatment meted out to him, to raise the morale of his fellow prisoners. The treatment which he received during his period of captivity is summarised in the succeeding paragraphs.

Fusilier Kinne escaped for the first time within 24 hours of capture but was retaken a few days later while attempting to regain our own lines. Eventually he rejoined a large group of prisoners being marched North to prison camps, and despite the hardships of this march, which lasted a month, rapidly emerged as a man of outstanding leadership and very high morale. His conduct was a fine example to all his fellow prisoners.

In July, 1952, Fusilier Kinne, who was by now well known to his captors, was accused by them of being non-co-operative and was brutally interrogated about the other P.W. who had uncooperative views. As a result of his refusal to inform on his comrades, and for striking back at a Chinese officer who assaulted him, he was twice severely beaten up and tied up for periods of 12 and 24 hours, being made to stand on tip-toe with a running noose round his neck which would throttle him if he attempted to relax in any way.

He escaped on 27th July but was recaptured two days later. He was again beaten up very severely, and placed in handcuffs (which could be and frequently were tightened so as to restrict circulation), from which he was not released until 16th October, 1952, a period of 81 days.

He was accused of insincerity, a hostile attitude towards the Chinese, sabotage of compulsory political study, escape, and of being reactionary. From the 15th to the 20th August he was confined in a very small box cell, where he was made to sit to attention all day, being periodically beaten, prodded with bayonets, kicked and spat upon by the guards, and denied any washing facilities.

On 20th August, 1952, he was made to stand to attention for seven hours and when he complained was beaten by the Chinese guard commander with the butt of a submachine gun, which eventually went off and killed the guard commander. For this Fusilier Kinne was beaten senseless with belts and bayonets, stripped of his clothes, and thrown into a dank rat-infested hole until the 19th September. He was frequently taken out and beaten, including once (on 16th September), with pieces of planking until he was unconscious.

On the 16th October Fusilier Kinne was tried by a Chinese military count for escape and for being a reactionary and hostile to the Chinese, and was sentenced to twelve months' solitary confinement. This was increased to eighteen months when he complained at his trial of denial of medical attention, including that for a severe double hernia which he had sustained in June, 1952, while training to escape.

On the 5th December, 1952, he was transferred to a special penal company. His last award of solitary confinement was on the 2nd June, 1953, when he was sentenced for defying Chinese orders and wearing a rosette in celebration of Coronation Day.

He was eventually exchanged at Panmunjon on the 10th August, 1953. As late as the 8th and 9th August he was threatened with non-repatriation for demanding an interview with the International Red Cross Representatives who were visiting Prisoner of War camps.

Fusilier Kinne was during the course of his periods of solitary confinement kept in no less than seven different places of imprisonment, including a security police jail, under conditions of the most extreme degradation and increasing brutality. Every possible method both physical and mental was employed by his captors to break his spirit, a task which proved utterly beyond their powers. Latterly he must have been fully aware that every time he flaunted his captors and showed openly his detestation of themselves and their methods he was risking his life. He was in fact several times threatened with death or non-repatriation. Nevertheless he was always determined to show that he was prepared neither to be intimidated nor cowed by brutal treatment at the hands of a barbarous enemy. His powers of resistance and his determination to oppose and fight the enemy to the maximum were beyond praise. His example was an inspiration to all ranks who came into contact with him.

Kinne's brother, Raymond, was killed in Korea while fighting with the Argyll and Sutherland Highlanders in 1950, the event which spurred Kinne to re-join the army to take revenge for his brother.

In 2010 Derek Kinne returned to Korea to commemorate the 60th Anniversary of the Korean War. Kinne died aged 87 after a battle with cancer on 6 February 2018 in Tucson, Arizona.
