= Federico Leardini =

Italian economic journalist (1979–2018)

- Born: 18 September 1979; Venice, Italy
- Died: 3 February 2018 (aged 38); Monza, Italy
- Occupation: economic journalist
- Years active: 2000–2018

Federico Leardini (Italian: [fedeˈriːko learˈdiːni]; (18 September 1979 – 3 February 2018) was an Italian economic journalist.

== Early life and education ==
Born in Venice on 18 September 1979, he moved to Milan in 2000 and here he obtained a degree in political science and a master's degree in international relations.

== Career ==
He began his career as an economic journalist at Class CNBC since 2001. He worked since 2011 at the information channel Sky TG24 where, in the morning, he managed the chronicle of world stock exchanges.

== Death ==
He suffered a heart attack on 2 February 2018 in the gym in Carate Brianza. Leardini died the following day at Saint Gerardo Hospital in Monza at the age of 38.

== See also ==
- Sky TG24
