= Sister Claire =

Indian religious sister and painter (1937–2018)

- Born: Meera; 1937; Andhra Pradesh
- Died: 11 February 2018 (aged 80–81); Bangalore
- Occupation: Religious sister
- Organization: Salesian Missionaries of Mary Immaculate (SMMI)

Sister Marie Claire (1937 – 11 February 2018) was a religious sister from Bangalore, India, and an artist with over 750 paintings and works. Her works are especially known for using Indian imagery in Christian scenes. As such, she is one of the few highly known contemporary Indian Christian artists.

== Early life ==
Sister Claire was the second of nine children born in Andhra Pradesh. She was born into an upper-caste Hindu family and given the name Meera. Her father was employed by the Indian railways and received frequent transfers. The family moved with him whenever he was transferred. When the family moved to Bangalore, Sr. Claire was sent to a Christian school, where she found a love for Jesus.

At the age of 17, to avoid an arranged marriage, she fled from her home to the St. Mary’s convent run by the Salesian Missionaries of Mary Immaculate (SMMI) at Bangalore. At the age of 18, she was baptized and joined the SMMI. Sr Claire was assigned to teach 6th and 7th standard classes. When she fell ill and was unable to teach, she started painting. Recognizing her talent, her mother superior sent her to art school.

== Artwork ==
Sister Claire's artwork has been gifted to Pope John Paul II by Sr Jane Scaria, the first Indian superior general of SMMI. Her works have also been featured in books, posters, blogs, and Christmas Cards. Sr Claire’s paintings revolve around stories and themes from the Bible in an Indian rural setting. She used bold colors and painted with typical Indian settings, symbols and dresses. She has painted on themes such as the Crucifixion, the Last Supper, and Christmas using Indian symbols and backgrounds. She is also known to have painted and printed more than 1000 Christmas cards annually.

Sr Claire’s works are displayed in a Christian art gallery located in the St Mary’s Convent premises in Chamrajpet in Bengaluru. The 1800-square-feet art gallery was opened by The Salesian Missionaries of Mary Immaculate (SMMI).

== Recognition ==
Pope Benedict XVI invited Sr Claire to the Vatican to be felicitated. She did not go, but the Pope sent a Cardinal to Bengaluru to honor her. She received the Assisi Award, a lifetime achievement award conferred by the Catholic Bishops’ Conference of India in 2012.
