= Weems Oliver Baskin III =

American politician

Member of the South Carolina House of Representatives for Richland County
- In office 1972–1974

Personal details
- Born: March 9, 1936
- Died: February 18, 2018 (aged 81)

Weems Oliver Baskin III (March 9, 1936 – February 12, 2018) was an American politician in the state of South Carolina. He served in the South Carolina House of Representatives from 1972 to 1974, representing Richland County. He attended the University of South Carolina.

He died on February 12, 2018.
