= Effy Irvine =

Euphemia Irvine
- Born: Euphemia Helen Clouston Brysland; 28 August 1924; Clydebank
- Died: February 2, 2018 (aged 93)
- Education: University of London, University of Glasgow
- Occupation: Minister
- Employer: Church of Scotland
- Known for: first woman in Scotland to run a parish
- Title: Reverend
- Spouse: Alexander Irvine (1951-)

Euphemia "Effy" Helen Clouston Irvine (28 August 1924 – February 2, 2018) was the first woman in Scotland to run a Church of Scotland parish Church.

== Life ==
Irvine was born in Clydebank on 28 August 1924. She was the daughter of James and Elizabeth. She was brought up in Jordanvale Parish Church in Glasgow. She was educated at Whiteinch school from 1929-36, though she left school when she was 14 and went to work in a plumbers office.

Irvine came to the ministry late. She had already left education and married when someone commented on her ability to speak. She decided that she wanted to work in the Church of Scotland and if she was going to speak then she needed to increase her qualifications. She decided to change her life after 16 years at home in 1968. She took a course at the University of London which enabled her to enrol on a course at the University of Glasgow.

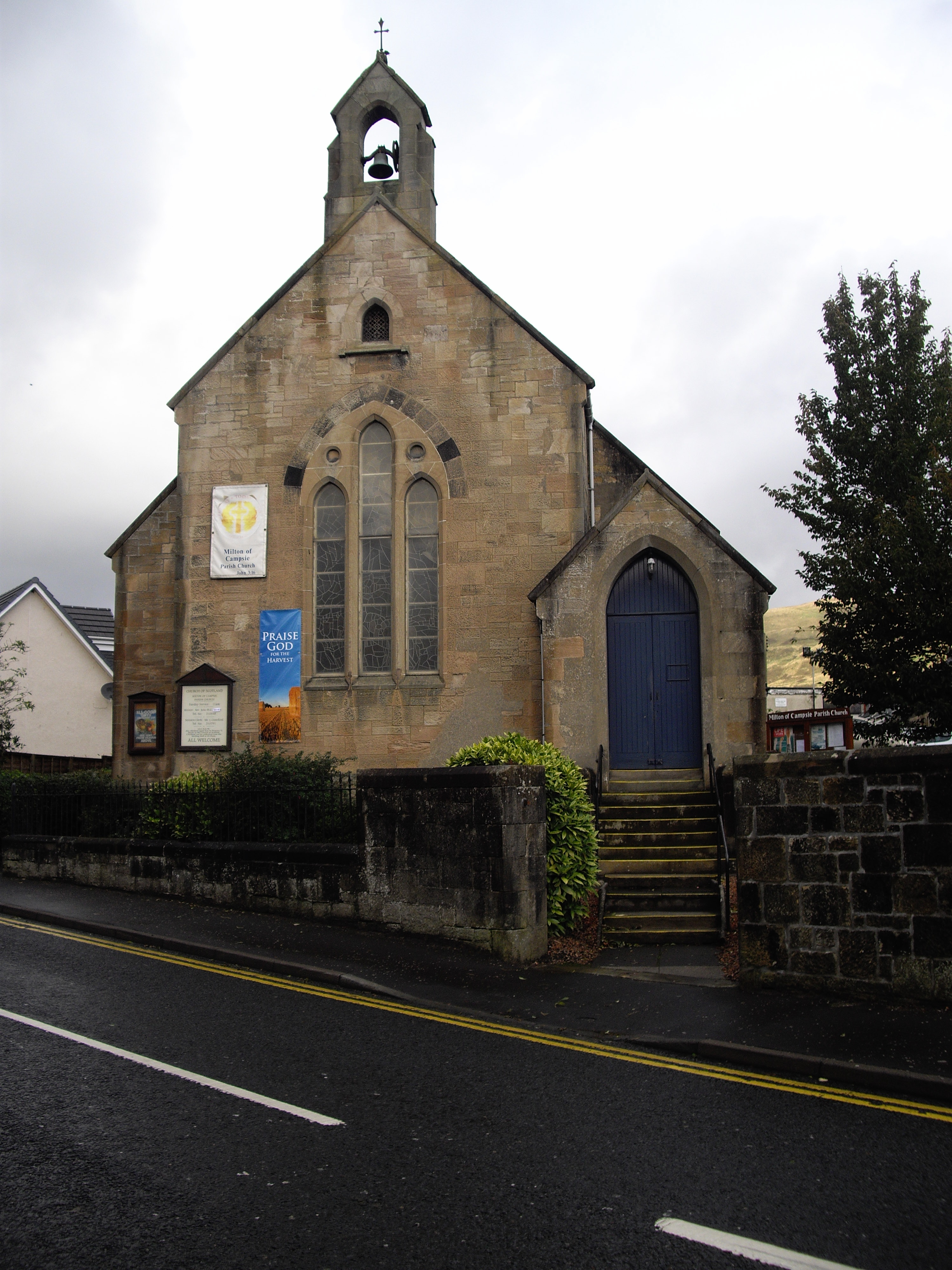
The old Parish Church in Milton of Campsie in 2011

As part of her course she was required to approach a Church of Scotland minister and find someone who she could work with. She chose the first-class cricketer James Aitchison who also served as a minister for 34 years. He was then minister of Broomhill in Glasgow and after asking advice from his church he agreed. While she was on the course the Church of Scotland decided that it would in principle accept women ministers. The church found this easier in Scotland than it would have been in England. Church of Scotland ministers are not expected to have any spiritual seniority but are just senior in the organisation.

She was the assistant at Broomhill in 1970-71, and at Glasgow: Renfield Centre from 1971-1972. She was licensed by the Presbytery of Glasgow on 10 June 1972.

She became the first woman minister in Scotland when she took on the parish of Campsie Trinity with Milton of Campsie on 1 June 1972. She had wanted to work in an urban area so she had turned down this position in the country four times before she accepted it. Irvine thought her parish had made a "leap of faith", but none of the congregation defected to other churches. Even though the first minister was appointed it was to be many years before the church had a woman moderator.

Six years later the parishes reorganised and Irvine agreed to stay on at Milton of Campsie until she retired in 1988. During her retirement she published ‘A Journey of Faith’ which was her autobiography.

She married Alexander Irvine on 17 February 1971. She died in 2018.
