= Doug Guetzloe =

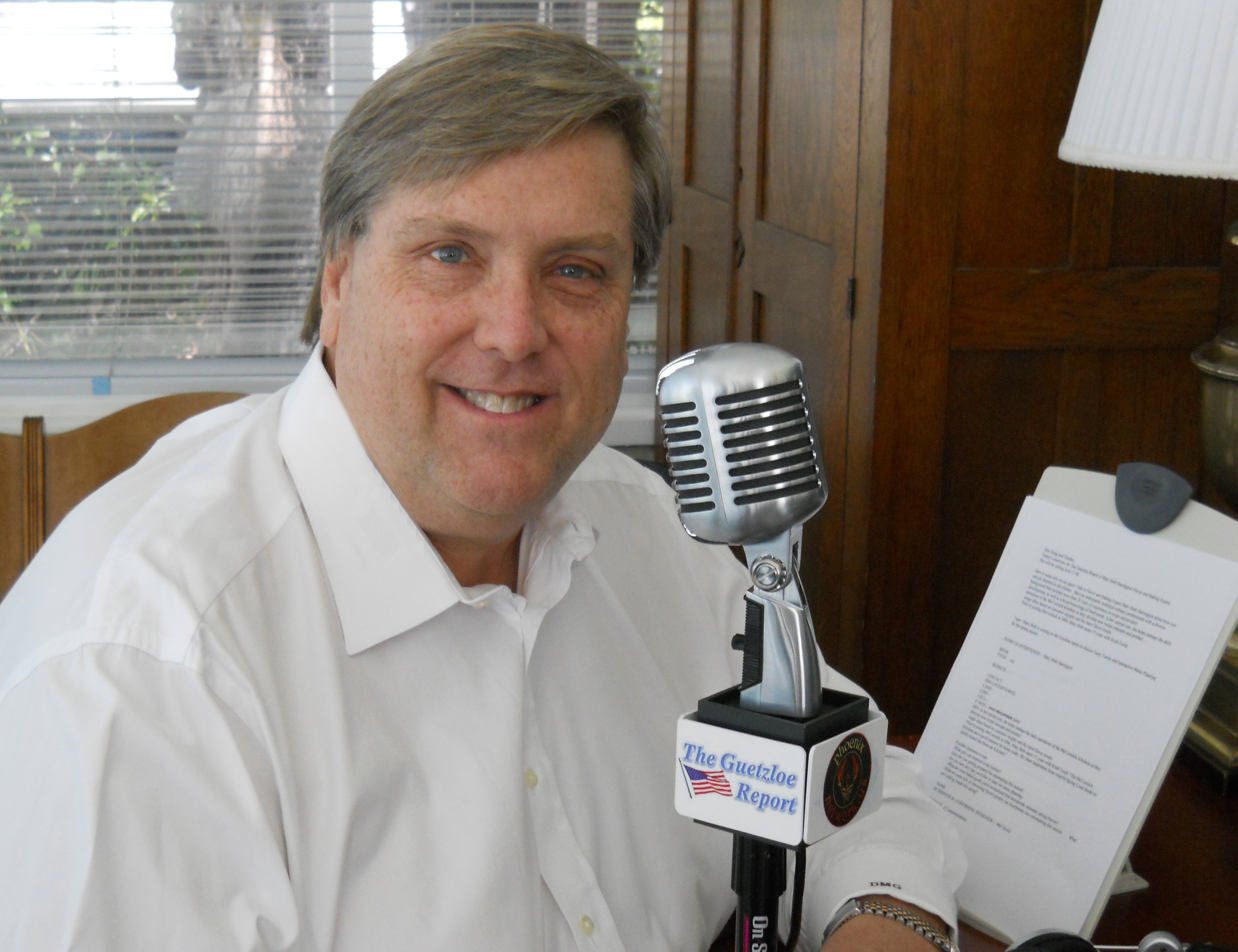
Radio host Doug Guetzloe

Douglas M. Guetzloe (June 15, 1954 – February 6, 2018) was the founder and chairman of Ax the Tax; a radio talk show host and founder of an internet broadcasting network.

== Biography ==
Guetzloe was a community activist who headed Ax the Tax, an anti-tax group in Florida, and a radio talk show host heard exclusively on the Phoenix Network, an internet radio station which he owned. His activities involve political and civic affairs in Central Florida as well as state and national issues. A graduate of Florida State University, Guetzloe served as the university's student body president (his student body vice president was former Florida Gov. Charlie Crist). Following graduation Guetzloe moved to Orlando, Florida to accept a position as public relations director for the Florida Fruit and Vegetable Association. Two years later, he was appointed the regional director for the Florida Medical Association where he handled public relations, lobbying and political matters in a 17-county area of Florida.

Guetzloe founded Ax the Tax in 1982 and shortly thereafter established a public relations and marketing company called Advantage Consultants. He contended his leadership as chair of Ax the Tax has led to 17 successful anti-tax battles. His successes have ranged from defeating the 2003 Mobility 20/20 sales tax increase for transportation to being described as "a knight in shining armor charging in on his white horse" by a city commissioner for successfully saving a historic trailer park in Winter Garden, Florida.

== Florida Taxpayers Union ==
Guetzloe helped found the Florida Taxpayers Union in 2004 as an affiliate of the National Taxpayers Union, a grassroots organization working for lower taxes, smaller government and accountability from public officials. The Florida group maintains it has more than 140,000 members, supporters and contributors throughout the state. The issues the Florida Taxpayers Union focuses on include high taxes that undermine private market competition, state regulatory burdens, wasteful government spending and lawsuit abuse. The group also promotes more access to school choice for parents, private property rights, a taxpayer bill of rights to restrain the growth of government and increased domestic oil and gas production for energy needs.

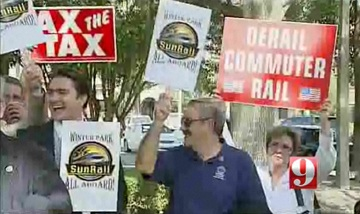
Ax the Tax Rally

== Campaign Flyer and First Amendment ==
In 2006, Guetzloe was charged with 14 misdemeanors for distributing a political campaign mailer that did not identify who paid for the flyer. Although 13 counts were dismissed in 2008 by Florida's 5th District Court of Appeal and Florida First District Federal Judge Stephen Mickle threw out the state's electioneering communications law in 2009 (the law which Guetzloe was charged under), Guetzloe was sentenced to a 60-day jail term by Orange County Circuit Judge C. Jeffery Arnold in May 2011. Guetzloe claimed he was the only person in America put in jail for not putting a seven-word disclaimer on a political campaign flyer. He also cited the 1995 U.S. Supreme Court ruling (McIntyre vs. Ohio Elections Commission), which stated that prohibition of the distribution of anonymous campaign literature abridges free speech in violation of the First Amendment.

In 2009, Guetzloe helped his longtime attorney Fred O’Neal found the Florida TEA Party, a registered political party in Florida, and created a firestorm of controversy resulting in lawsuits against O’Neal, Guetzloe and the Florida TEA Party. All lawsuits were settled in favor of O’Neal, Guetzloe and the fledgling Florida TEA Party. O'Neal said the Florida TEA Party may have helped Florida Governor Rick Scott win a close race with Florida Attorney General Bill McCollum in the 2010 Republican Primary for Governor, citing e-mails sent to 100,000 Floridians in the final hours of the primary.

== The Guetzloe Report ==
In 2010, Guetzloe formed The Phoenix Network and placed his long-running radio show on the network. The Guetzloe Report, which began broadcasting daily in January 1997, receives an average of 12,000 listeners a day with some shows reaching more than 50,000 listeners. In February 2011, Guetzloe and the Phoenix Network were invited to broadcast live from the Ronald Reagan Library and Museum at the Centennial Celebration of Ronald Reagan’s birthday. In 2011, Guetzloe was designated Republican presidential campaign commentator on The Voice of Russia, the Russian government's international radio service. Guetzloe’s work as a radio commentator, political consultant and anti-tax activist “makes him unique among political figures in Florida,” according to the Orlando Sentinel. “Regular targets range from the mayors of Orlando and Orange County to the Orlando Sentinel to other lobbyists he considers enemies.”

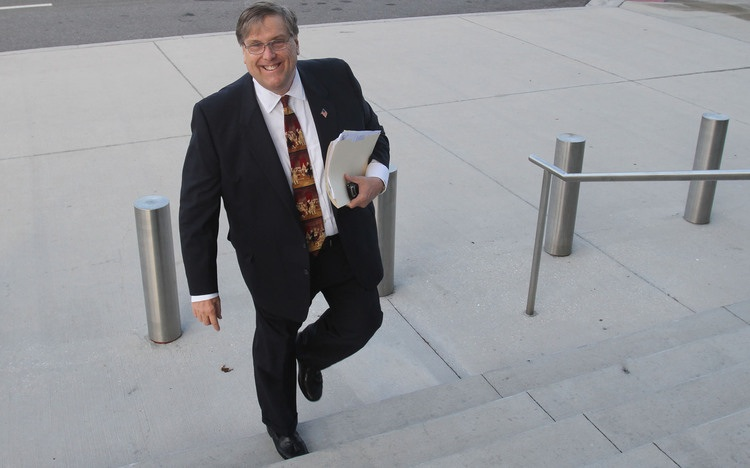
Doug Guetzloe arriving at court.

In 2012, Guetzloe was found guilty of two misdemeanor counts of willful failure to file tax returns. The two counts arose from Guetzloe's failure to file tax returns for 2005 and 2006. Guetzloe accrued over $180,000 in income during each of the years he failed to file returns. At the trial Guetzloe was represented by a public defender.

Guetzloe was married and had three children. He died on February 6, 2018.
