= Domingo Pillado =

Chilean footballer (1928–2018)

Personal information
- Date of birth: 25 January 1928
- Date of death: 5 February 2018 (aged 90)

International career
Years	Team	Apps	(Gls)
- Chile

Domingo Pillado (25 January 1928 – 5 February 2018) was a Chilean footballer. He competed in the men's tournament at the 1952 Summer Olympics.
