= Troy Blakely =

American talent agent (1949–2018)

Troy Blakely (December 18, 1949 – February 10, 2018) was an American talent agent, Executive Vice President, Managing Partner and Head of Music for the Agency for the Performing Arts (APA). Blakely was made Head of Music in 1998, made an EVP and Partner in 2002 and was made a Managing Partner with the new set of Managing Partners in 2005, reshaping APA.

== Background ==
Blakely was born just outside Detroit, Michigan to Albert Blakely, a steel worker, and his wife, Grace. He was raised and schooled in Southgate, Michigan. In his teens, he performed and played guitar with numerous Michigan bands. After starting college in 1968, he left in 1969 to become the tour manager for Mitch Ryder & The Detroit Wheels, who were then managed by Barry Kramer, owner of Creem magazine. He moved to New York City in 1970 to work as Assistant Tour Manager for Johnny Winter under Teddy Slatus, at that time one of the best tour managers in the music business. After assisting in putting together Edgar Winter and White Trash, he returned to Michigan to work as tour manager for Detroit featuring Mitch Ryder, who had just released their album Detroit on Paramount Records with Danny Goldberg. In late 1972, he was offered the position of agent for Diversified Management Agency (DMA) located in Sterling Heights, Michigan.

== Career ==
While at DMA, representing artists such as Ted Nugent, Bob Seger, Iggy and the Stooges, MC5, Nazareth, Golden Earring, Canned Heat, Birtha, Lighthouse, The Raspberries, and Blackfoot, he signed Tim Buckley, Sammy Hagar, Scorpions and Triumph. He departed DMA in January 1981 and for a brief time was employed by Magna Artists of Los Angeles, where he booked Ozzy Osbourne's first solo tour, Blizzard of Oz. In September 1981, he moved to International Creative Management (ICM), taking with him Sammy Hagar and Triumph. While at ICM in Los Angeles, he signed Red Hot Chili Peppers and Poison. In 1986, he moved to the ICM New York office where he expanded his roster to Boston, Faith No More, Alice in Chains, Kings X, Y&T, and The Black Crowes. He also served as responsible agent for Rush, Ozzy Osbourne, Iron Maiden and Robert Plant.

In September 1994, he left ICM and shortly after joined the Agency for the Performing Arts (APA) the same year, bringing along with him Poison, Brett Michaels, Boston and The Black Crowes. In 1998, he moved to the Los Angeles office to become the Head of Music for the agency. While at APA, he signed Robert Plant, Fleetwood Mac, Sammy Hagar, Heart, The Go-Go's, Lenny Kravitz, Judas Priest, Whitesnake, Zakk Wylde, Black Label Society, Ratt, Cinderella, Dokken, Sebastian Bach and Lita Ford.

On November 18, 2010, Blakely was presented with a Hollywood F.A.M.E. Award during the 20th Annual LA Music Awards.

== Personal life and death ==
Blakely was married to Kelly Blakely.

Blakely died on February 10, 2018, at the age of 68.
