= Mordechai E. Kreinin =

Israeli–American economist (1930–2018)

Mordechai Eliahu "Max" Kreinin (Hebrew: מרדכי אליהו קרינין; 20 January 1930 – 9 February 2018) was an Israeli-born American economist who was University Distinguished Professor of Economics at Michigan State until 2014.

He was born in Rishon LeZion to parents Avraham and Joheved Kreinin. He attended Herzliya Hebrew Gymnasium, received a bachelor's degree from the University of Tel Aviv, and earned a doctorate in economics from University of Michigan. He began teaching at Michigan State University in 1957. Over the course of his career, Kreinin helped develop the Finger-Kreinin index to measure the similarity of exports between nations and served as president of the International Trade and Finance Association.

Kreinin died at the age of 88 on 9 February 2018.
