= John Agitation =

Trinidadian comedian and storyteller (1927–2018)

- Born: Ramdeen Ramjattan; 24 July 1927; Caratal, Trinidad and Tobago, British Windward Islands
- Died: February 5, 2018 (aged 90)
- Occupations: Comedian, storyteller, politician
- Political party: United National Congress

Ramdeen Ramjattan, known as John Agitation (24 July 1927 – 5 February 2018), was a Trinidadian comedian, civil servant, politician and storyteller. He was a graduate of the Progressive Educational Institute and served in the Trinidad and Tobago Civil Service. He was also the first comedian in the Commonwealth of Nations to win an election.

In 1951, at 24, Ramdeen was introduced to the Trinbagonian national audience by Landy de Montbrun, a leading local comic at the time. He told a joke, slightly nervous that he was crossing the boundary of taste. But the crowd was elated. "They were very happy to see a (dark-skinned) fella," Agitation later remarked.

From there, Agitation became a regular on Radio Trinidad, particularly the Horace James Comedy Hour, Sunday Serenade (hosted by Sam Ghany) and the Aunty Kay Children's Show. The latter was sponsored by Bermudez Biscuit Company Limited for decades. He performed in many venues in Trinidad and Tobago as the headline performer, often to sold-out shows.

He was the first candidate to run on a United National Congress (UNC) ticket: he contested and won a 1989 by-election in the Sangre Grande Regional Corporation for the Guaico-Cumuto district, thus becoming the first comedian in the Commonwealth of Nations to win an election.

Ramjattan retired, lived on his public service pension, but still performed occasionally until his death in 2018. In 2003, he was awarded the Hummingbird Medal (Silver) by the government of Trinidad and Tobago, for his more than five-decade-long work to preserve Trinbagonian and Caribbean folklore via comedic storytelling.
