= Richard C. Lamb =

American astrophysicist (1933–2018)

Richard C. Lamb (September 8, 1933 – February 10, 2018) was an American astrophysicist.

A native of Lexington, Kentucky, Lamb earned his bachelor's degree from the Massachusetts Institute of Technology. He began graduate work at the University of Kentucky after a stint in the military, earning a doctorate in 1963. Lamb worked for Argonne National Laboratory, then began teaching at Iowa State University until his retirement in 1996. Lamb later became a visiting professor at the California Institute of Technology. A member of the American Astronomical Society and the International Astronomical Union, Lamb was also granted fellowship of the American Physical Society.
