= James Aitchison (cricketer) =

Scottish minister and cricketer

Personal information
- Full name: James Aitchison
- Born: 26 May 1920; Kilmarnock, Ayrshire
- Died: 13 February 1994 (aged 73); Glasgow
- Batting: Right-handed
- Bowling: Right-arm medium

Domestic team information
- Years: Team
- 1946–1963: Scotland

Career statistics
Competition	First-class
Matches	50
Runs scored	2,786
Batting average	32.77
100s/50s	5/13
Top score	190*
Balls bowled	18
Wickets	0
Bowling average	–
5 wickets in innings	–
10 wickets in match	–
Best bowling	–
Catches/stumpings	22/–
- Source: CricInfo, 19 March 2017

James Aitchison (26 May 1920 – 13 February 1994) was a Scottish minister in the Church of Scotland and a first-class cricketer.

== Early life ==
He was born in Kilmarnock on 26 May 1920. He was educated at Kilmarnock Academy, and then later Glasgow University.

== Cricketing career ==
Only two other players have appeared more times in first class cricket for Scotland, and Aitchison holds the team's record for most career runs and highest individual score. In the match against Ireland in 1959 he batted throughout the first day to make 190 not out. He scored centuries against two touring Test playing nations, 106 not out in a team score of 177 against the 1947 South Africans and nine years later struck 100 against the Australians. In club cricket for Kilmarnock he made 18,344 runs with 56 centuries.

He had 3,669 international runs, one of Scotland's most prolific run scorers.

== Ministry career ==
Aitchison served as a minister in the Church of Scotland for 34 years until his retirement in 1986. He served as minister of St Stephen's Church in Edinburgh from 1952 until 1963. From there, he moved to Broomhill Church, Glasgow.

During his career he took on a divinity student to help her learn whilst he was minister of Broomhill in Glasgow. The Reverend Euphemia Irvine was to be the first woman to lead a parish in Scotland. In 2011 he was one of the twelve initial inductees into the Scottish Cricket Hall of Fame.

== Personal life ==
Aitchison died in the morning of 13 February 1994 at the Beatson Institute in Glasgow after a prolonged illness. He was married to Catherine, and had two daughters, Mary and Elizabeth.
