= Zoltán Agócs =

Slovak-Hungarian architect

Zoltán Agócs (24 April 1938 – 14 February 2018) was a Slovak-Hungarian architect.

== Biography ==
Agócs was born on 4 April 1938 Fiľakovo, Czechoslovakia. He matriculated in Lučenec at the Building Trade High School in 1957. He finished his master's degree as an architect in 1962 at the Architectural Department of Slovak University of Technology in Bratislava After finishing his studies at the university, he started to teach there. From 1982 he became an associate professor; from 1990 he was a professor. He was senior lecturer and from 1994 to 2000 he was the vice-dean of Architectural Department. He wrote several course books and monographies. He was the member of several scientific groups, from 1998 he was the honorary professor of Technical University of Timișoara.

Agócs died on 14 February 2018 in Senec, Slovakia.

== Works ==
As a researcher he worked with the structure of ropes, questions regarding theoretical and structural fields. Other field of his work was the architectural usage of steel structures. He took part planning of several bridges in Czechoslovakia and Hungary. He was one of the patrones of the reconstruction Mária Valéria Bridge connecting Štúrovo and Esztergom.

His most recognised work was the planning of Apollo Bridge of Bratislava.

=== Books ===
- Torsion of Steel Beams (Together with: Iványi M., Balázs I., 1990)
- Diagnostikovanie a rekonštrukcia oceľových konštrukcií (together with: J. Brodniansky, J. Vielan, 2004)

== Honours ==
- Ányos Jedlik Prize (2000)
- Ľudovít Štúr Prize degree III. (2000)
- Prize for Hungarian Art (2002)
- Saint Gorazd Great Memorial Placket (2003)

== Sources ==
- Szlovákiai Magyar Adatbank
- Elhuny Agócs Zoltán professzor, hirek.sk

== Further information ==
- Miroslav Maťaščík, Agócs Zoltán: Apollo, a pozsonyi új Duna-híd, Magyar Tudomány, 2008/04 429. o.
