= Floros Konstantinou =

Greek politician

- Φλώρος Κωνσταντίνου
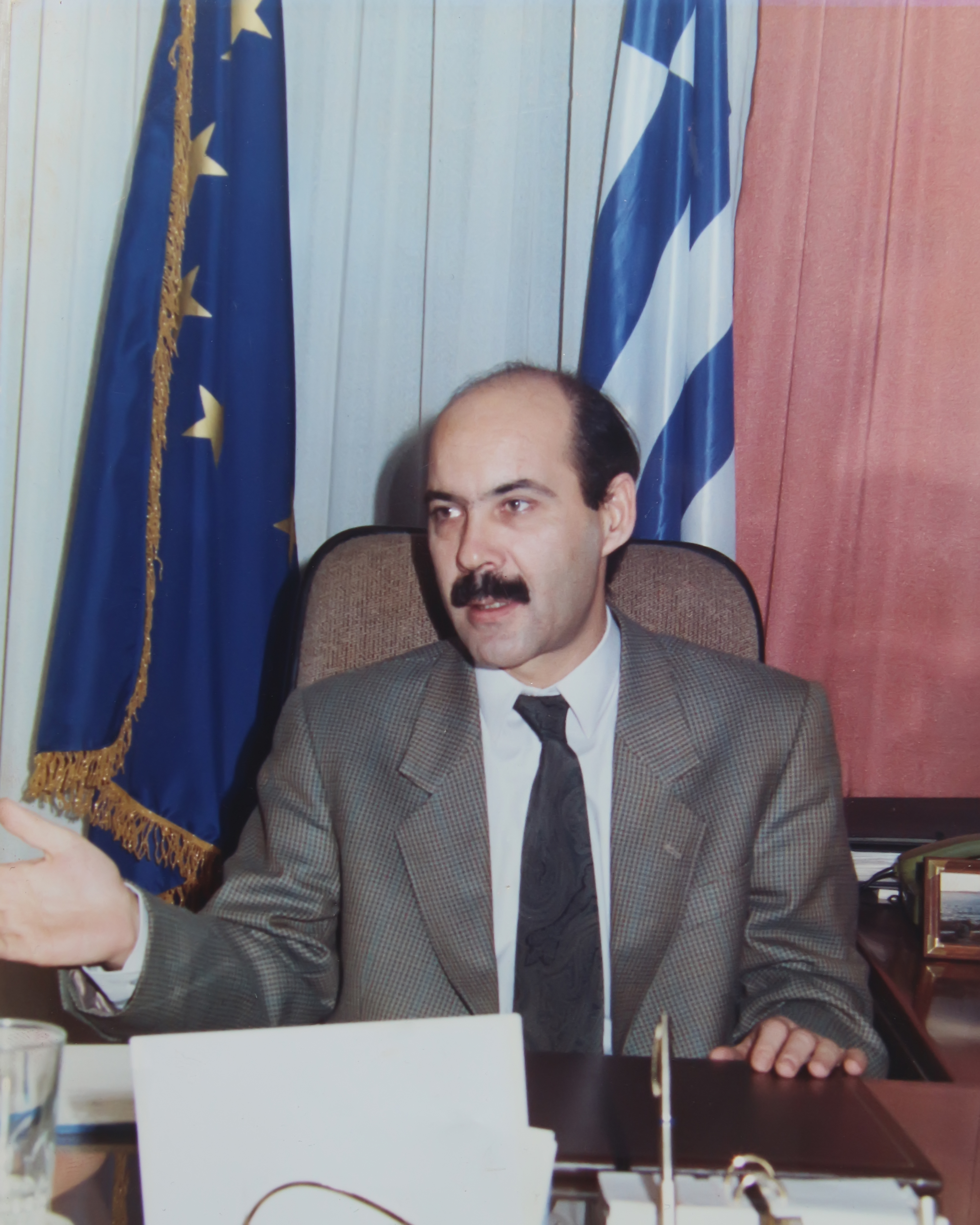

Deputy Minister of Agriculture
- In office October 1993 – September 1995
- Prime Minister: Andreas Papandreou

Member of the Parliament of the Hellenes
- In office 2000–2004
- Prime Minister: Konstantinos Simitis
- Constituency: Drama
- In office 1981–1996
- Constituency: Drama

Personal details
- Born: 8 October 1952 Kalambaki, Drama, Greece
- Died: 19 February 2018 (aged 65) Drama
- Party: Panhellenic Socialist Movement (PASOK)
- Spouse: Ourania Valixoglou
- Children: Stergios Konstantinou
- Education: Panteion University; Université libre de Bruxelles; Bucharest Academy of Economic Studies; Aristotle University of Thessaloniki

Floros Konstantinou (Greek: Φλώρος Κωνσταντίνου; 8 October 1952 – 19 February 2018) was a Greek politician, historian and economist, who served as a Member of the Parliament and Deputy Minister of Agriculture with PASOK. He was a graduate of Political Sciences and a holder of two doctoral degrees, the first with the rural economy and the second in history of Hellenism in Romania.

== Early life ==
Born in 1952 in Kalambaki, Drama. Sixth child of the refugees Fotis and Stergianis Konstantinou, he grew up in Kalambaki where he finished high school. He studied political science at the Panteion University between 1972 and 1976 where he participated at the Athens Polytechnic uprising against the "greek military junta". After the end of the dictatorship (24 July 1974) and the establishment of the Third Hellenic Republic he became a political activist within the university with the political group "Friends of Andreas Papandreou" which, later on, was renamed as "PASP" which was the student political party of the "Panhellenic Socialistic Movement". Then he graduated and because of his outstanding results (Grade: "Excellent", 10/10) he was awarded a scholarship for a doctorate in the field of agricultural economics from the Bucharest Academy of Economic Studies, which he obtained. In 1980-1981, he moved to Brussels and followed a master in political science at the Universite Libre de Bruxelles.

== Career ==
From 1 January 1981 he was a member of YEPEK (PASOK Representation Office in the European Parliament). He was first elected MP for PASOK for Drama in October 1981 and has since been elected until 1996. Since 1984 he has been a member of the Central Committee of the Movement and has also served as a member and secretary of the PASOK Cooperative Guild.

From October 1993 to September 1995, he was Deputy Minister of Agriculture in the last government of Andreas Papandreou. He handled Agriculture and Fisheries issues in the European Union, especially in the first half of 1994, when Greece held the presidency of the EU and patented over 150 products as PDO and PGI (oils, cheeses, fruits, legumes, etc.), including the Greek Feta. In the period 1996–1997 he was a consultant at the Ministry of Foreign Affairs and then a consultant at "SEKAP" industry. He published two books on Greek agriculture within the framework of the European Union ("Greek Agriculture and the International Environment" by Livani's Publishing) and regularly wrote to the Greek Press.

In 2000–2004, he was last elected for the last time as an MP of PASOK for Drama and in the period 2001–2004 he was Parliamentary Spokesman of the party. During the period 2006–2013 he made his second doctoral thesis at the Aristotle University of Thessaloniki on "The economic presence of Greeks in Romania from the Crimean to the First World War". Since then, he has continued the research of the presence of Hellenism in North of the Danube from the 16th to the 20th century.

He spoke Romanian, French and English. He was married to the philologist Ourania Valixoglou and their son is Stergios Konstantinou. He died on 19 February 2018.

== Table of History ==
Election date	Office	Prime-Minister of Greece
18/10/1981	Parliament Member. Constituency: Drama	Andreas Papandreou
2/6/1985	Parliament Member. Constituency: Drama	Andreas Papandreou
18/6/1989	Parliament Member. Constituency: Drama	Tzannis Tzannetakis
5/11/1989	Parliament Member. Constituency: Drama	Xenophon Zolotas
8/4/1990	Parliament Member. Constituency: Drama	Konstantinos Mitsotakis
10/10/1993	Deputy minister of agriculture	Andreas Papandreou
9/4/2000	Speaker of PASOK in the parliament	Konstantinos Simitis
