= Teddi Siddall =

American actress

- Born: Theodora Siddall; August 12, 1953; Evanston, Illinois, U.S.
- Died: February 4, 2018 (aged 64); Studio City, California, U.S.
- Resting place: Forest Lawn Memorial Park
- Other names: Theodora Siddall Cole; Teddi Cole
- Education: University of Cincinnati – College-Conservatory of Music, 1975
- Occupations: Actress, writer
- Years active: 1977–2018
- Spouse: Gary Cole (m. 1992)
- Children: 1

Theodora "Teddi" Siddall (August 12, 1953– February 4, 2018) was an American actress and writer. She appeared in several roles in the television series Grey's Anatomy, Wings, LA Law, Hill Street Blues, and Happy Days, and the films Fade to Black, Prizzi's Honor, and Forever Strong. She also appeared in several television movies.

== Early life ==
Siddall graduated from Woodward High School in Cincinnati, Ohio in 1971. She graduated from the University of Cincinnati – College-Conservatory of Music in 1975.

== Personal life ==
Siddall married actor Gary Cole in 1992. They had one child, Mary, who is autistic. Siddall filed for divorce from Cole in 2017. Siddall died in 2018.

== Partial filmography ==
=== Film ===
- The Pleasure Palace (1980)
- Fade to Black (1980)
- Nichols and Dymes (1981)
- Tomorrow's Child (1982, TV movie)
- Prizzi's Honor (1985) - Beulah
- Roe vs. Wade (1989, TV movie)
- She Said No (1990, TV movie)
- The Switch (1993)
- Indecent Seduction (1996)
- The Accident (1997, TV movie)
- Lies He Told (1997, TV movie)
- Forever Strong (2008)

=== Television ===
- Happy Days (1974)
- Hill Street Blues (1981)
- Midnight Caller (1989–91)
- LA Law (1986)
- Wings (1996)
- Lies He Told (1997)
- Grey's Anatomy (2006)
