= Francis M. McDaniel Jr. =

American politician

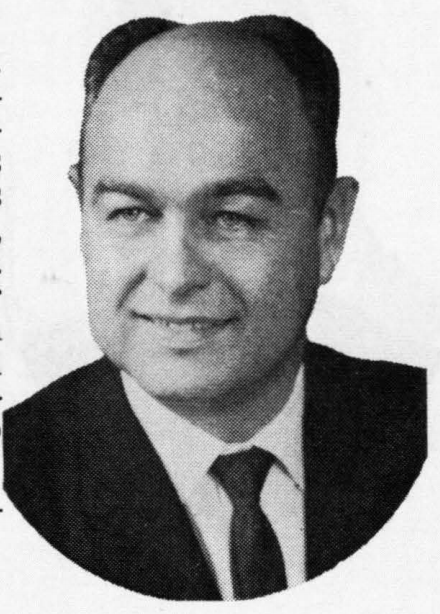

Member of the South Dakota House of Representatives for the 51st district
- In office 1963–1966

Personal details
- Born: March 25, 1923 Lantry, South Dakota, U.S.
- Died: February 1, 2018 (aged 94) Hot Springs, South Dakota, U.S.
- Party: Democratic
- Profession: car dealer, engineer

Francis Marion McDaniel Jr. (March 25, 1923 – February 1, 2018) was an American politician in the state of South Dakota who served as a member of the South Dakota House of Representatives. He is an alumnus of Black Hills State University, Northrop University and was an aeronautic engineer and car dealer. He worked as an engineer for the Western Eletrochemical Company and the American Potash and Chemical Company. McDaniel died in Hot Springs, South Dakota on February 1, 2018, at the age of 94.
