= Zarnigar Agakisiyeva =

Azerbaijani actress

- Born: Zarnigar Fati qizi Agakisiyeva; 6 November 1945; Rustov, Guba Rayon, AzSSR, USSR
- Died: 8 February 2018 (aged 72); Baku, Azerbaijan

Zarnigar Agakisiyeva (Azerbaijani: Zərnigar Fəti qızı Ağakişiyeva; 1945–2018) was an Azerbaijani theatre and cinema actress, and recipient of the People's Artist of the Republic of Azerbaijan award (2000) and Azerbaijan SSR State Prize laureate. She died from heart failure at the age of 72.
