= Sumner Jules Glimcher =

American filmmaker (1924–2018)

Sumner Jules Glimcher (born June 4, 1924, in Boston, Massachusetts, died February 27, 2018, in Boulder, Colorado) was a professor, author and filmmaker.

== Biography ==
After surviving gunshot wounds at the Battle of the Bulge, Glimcher began an extensive career in communications, creating International Transmissions Inc, a precursor to CNN, and making documentaries Hiroshima, Alberto Giacometti, Confucius and September 11th. In between his media work, Glimcher taught at his alma mater Harvard University, along with Columbia University and New York University where he was Director of the Department of Film, Video and Broadcasting at the New York University School of Continuing Education. He lived in New York City where he operated a multimedia production company, Westminster Productions Inc. and produced and moderated monthly film screenings titled “Meet The Filmmaker” at the National Academy of Television Arts & Sciences New York.

== Films ==
- A Taste of Provence
- The Panama Canal: The History and Operation
- 7 Days in September as himself

== Books ==
- “Movie Making: A Guide To Film Production”
- “A Filmmaker’s Journal”
