= Blas Calzada Terrados =

Spanish economist (1937–2018)

President of Comisión Nacional del Mercado de Valores
- In office 22 September 2001 – 6 October 2004
- Preceded by: Pilar Valiente Calvo
- Succeeded by: Manuel Conthe Gutiérrez

Chairman of Instituto Nacional de Estadística
- In office 1977–1979
- Preceded by: Andrés Fernández Díaz
- Succeeded by: José Montes Fernández

Personal details
- Born: 8 June 1937 Valladolid, Spain
- Died: 17 February 2018 (aged 80) Madrid, Spain
- Education: University of Valladolid
- Occupation: Economist

Blas Calzada Terrados (8 June 1937 – 17 February 2018), was a Spanish economist.

He studied at the Zorrilla Institute of Valladolid, graduated in Economics and began studying Political Science at the University of Valladolid. He studied two years in Paris: Marxist economics and in the second year Planning Techniques and National Accounting. Through a grant from the French Ministry of Finance Calzada worked in the Center of Assistance to Foreign Officials (ASTEF).

He was hired by the National Institute of Statistics (INE) to draft the Technical Report of Revenue. He later approved the exams for the newly created Research Service of the Bank of Spain where he stayed for three years, after which he worked for seven years as an advisor and executive in different companies, mainly in the food sector. He was one of the founders of the economy magazine Cambio 16.

He was Director General of the INE between 1977 and 1979, period in which he participated in the drafting of the economic plan of the Moncloa Pacts. After this period he was hired by the Trade Union Board of the Bolsa de Madrid as Director of the Economic Studies Service and was subsequently appointed Chairman of the National Securities Market Commission (CNMV) between 22 September 2001 and 6 October 2004.

Later he held the chairmanship of the Technical Advisory Committee of the IBEX 35 (CAT) and president of the La Salle Innovation Park.
