= Gerald Ensley =

American journalist

Gerald Ensley (Aug. 16, 1951 – 16 February 2018) was a newspaper reporter and columnist for the Tallahassee Democrat as well as an author. He appeared on WFSU's show Perspectives.

He was born on an Air Force base in Nagoya, Japan. His father was an Air Force master sergeant and then worked for the federal civil service. His mother was a civil service clerk typist who became a procurement supervisor in the federal government. He graduated from Satellite Beach High School in 1969.

He attended Florida State University (FSU) in Tallahassee for two years before dropping out and working various jobs including as a taxi driver in Tallahassee before returning to FSU and graduating with a political science degree in 1980. Flambeau for two years in 1978 and 1980, winning a College Sportswriter Of the Year award from Sports Illustrated in 1980. After graduating he joined the Tallahassee Democrat.

He was married to Sally Karioth and raised her daughter Amanda Karioth-Thompson with her. He made a short video documentary of one of his vacations travelling. He wrote up detailed instructions for his funeral. The Desert Sun published photos of him "through the years".

In 2022, Florida State University established an endowed developing writer award named in his honor. Johnny Bell was the inaugural recipient.

== Publishings ==
- From The Sidelines, The Best of Bill McGrotha (1993), editor
- Tallahassee Democrat, 100 Years (2005)
- We Found Paradise': Gerald Ensley on the History and Eccentricities of His Beloved Tallahassee, a collection of his articles (2018)
