= Liliana Bodoc =

Argentine writer

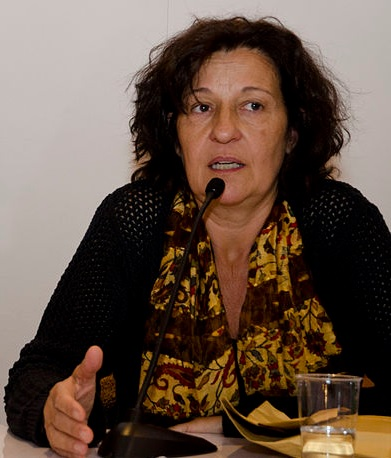
- Born: 21 July 1958
- Died: 6 February 2018 (aged 59)
- Occupation: Writer
- Writing career
- Genre: Fantasy

Liliana Bodoc (21 July 1958 – 6 February 2018) was an Argentine writer of fantasy.

== Life ==
Liliana Bodoc was born in Santa Fe in 1958. When she was five years old, her family moved to Mendoza for work. There, she studied at the Universidad Nacional de Cuyo and was awarded a Bachelor of Arts degree in Literature. Raised as an atheist, she converted to Islam in 1994.

Bodoc authored La Saga de los Confines, a series of three fantasy novels that were originally published in 2000 in Spanish. The first of these books was translated into English as The Days of the Deer. Her work is very popular in Latin America and her style was admired by Ursula K. Le Guin (who died less than a month before Bodoc).
