= Harriet Fier =

American writer and editor (1950–2018)

Harriet Fier (June 6, 1950 – February 21, 2018) was an American writer and editor. After graduating from college, Fier got a job with Rolling Stone in San Francisco as a switchboard operator.

== Career ==
She became the managing editor of the magazine in 1978, and held this position until 1980. She was the only female managing editor in Rolling Stone's history. At one point her job involved removing various of the magazine's star-struck staffers from the proximity of Hunter S. Thompson.

After leaving Rolling Stone, Fier edited the Style section of The Washington Post''. Fier held the position for four years, and her later jobs included senior editorships at Time Inc., Bantam Books and Simon and Schuster.

== Marriage and Death ==
Fier married Stephen Mantell in 1989, partnering with him in making documentary films.

Fier died of complications from breast cancer. She had fought the disease for nearly 20 years.
