= Caroline Brown (cellist) =

English cellist (1953–2018)

Caroline Mary Brown (9 July 1953 – 5 February 2018) was an English cellist who was known for forming the Hanover Band in 1980 that aimed to play music of the Hanoverian era exactly as it originally sounded with the correct instruments and original scores.
