= Gochomu J. Mudzingwa =

Traditional ruler in Zimbabwe (1916–2018)

Gochomu J. Mudzingwa (1916 – 16 February 2018) was a Zimbabwean traditional ruler, who had been substantive Chief of Wozhele since 18 February 2008 after the death of his uncle, Ndaba, who ruled the tribe since 1954. Wozheri, Hozhele and Hozheri were his synonyms. He worked as a cattle middle man for the colonial white settlers when he was young.

== Death ==
Mudzingwa died on 16 February 2018 at the age of 101 from pneumonia: he was one of the longest-lived members of any royal family. He was survived by his daughter. He was buried in Sanyati.
