= Michael J. Pikal =

American pharmaceutical scientist (1939–2018)

Michael J. Pikal (August 17, 1939 – February 26, 2018) was an American pharmaceutical scientist.

Pikal was born in Wadena, Minnesota, on August 17, 1939, to parents Harold and Sophie. He attended Henning High School and earned a bachelor's degree in chemistry from St. John's University, then received a doctorate from Iowa State University in 1966. Pikal was an assistant professor at the University of Tennessee from 1967 to 1972. He joined Eli Lilly and Company as a senior research scientist later that year. Pikal left the company in 1996 to teach at the University of Connecticut, where he was appointed Pfizer Distinguished Endowed Chair in Pharmaceutical Technology in 2005. Pikal married Janice L. Klein, with whom he had five children. He retired in December 2017 and died at home in Mansfield Center, Connecticut, on February 26, 2018, aged 78.
