= Chris Weedon =

British academic

Chris Weedon (born 1952, Hamburg) is a British academic, and Professor Emerita at Cardiff University.

== Life ==
She graduated from Southampton University and took her doctorate at the University of Birmingham. After her Phd she went into teaching whilst living in the UK and Germany. She joined Cardiff University in 1984.

Her 1987 book Feminist Practice & Poststructuralist Theory has been translated into German and Korean.

In 2010 she announced £4m funding for a project on multiculturalism at Cardiff University. The project would fund four PhD students, and the research would look at the challenges to culture for both white and black citizens. Weedon considered that there were particular complexities for those living in Wales.

Weedon was the chair of the Butetown History & Arts Centre.

== Works ==
=== Author ===
- Feminist Practice and Poststructuralist Theory ( B. Blackwell, 1987) ISBN 9780631198253 2nd. ed 2003. ISBN 9780631198253
  - Review
  - translated into German by Elke Hentschel as Wissen und Erfahrung : feministische Praxis und poststrukturalistische Theorie 1991 ISBN 9783905493139
  - translated into Chinese by Xiaohong Bai as: 女性主義實踐與後結構主義理論 / Nu xing zhu yi shi jian yu hou jie gou zhu yi li lun ISBN 9789575517182
  - translated into Korean as: 여성해방의 실천과 후기 구조주의 이론 ISBN 9788973000005
- Feminism, Theory and the Politics of Difference (Blackwell Publishers, 1999). ISBN 9780631198246
- Identity and Culture: Narratives of Difference and Belonging (Open University Press, 2004), ISBN 9780335200863
- Gender, Feminism and Fiction in Germany 1840-1914 (Peter Lang, 2007) ISBN 9780820463315
- Cultural politics : class, gender, race, and the postmodern world (with Glenn Jordan) B. Blackwell, 1995 ISBN 9780631162285

Review

=== Editor ===
- Die Frau in der DDR: An Anthology of Women's Writing from the German Democratic Republic ( B. Blackwell, 1988) ISBN 9781571810489
- Postwar Women's Writing in German: Feminist Critical Approaches (Berghahn Books, 1997). ISBN 9781571810489
  - Review by R Rossi
- Gendering Border Studies (with Jane Aaron; Henrice Altink) University of Wales Press, 2010 ISBN 9781299200753
