= Moroney =

Moroney is a surname. Notable people with the surname include:

- Davitt Moroney (born 1950), British musicologist and keyboardist
- Des Moroney (1935–2018), Canadian ice hockey player
- Jack Moroney (1917–1999), Australian cricketer
- James Moroney (born 1953), American rower
- Jim Moroney (baseball) (1883–1929), American baseball player
- Jim Moroney (public servant) (1898–1965), Australian public servant
- Joe Moroney (1890–1956), Australian rules footballer
- Ken Moroney (born 1945), Australian police commissioner
- Mary Agnes Moroney (1928–2003), American child who went missing in 1930
- Megan Moroney (born 1997), American singer
- Mick Moroney (born 1950), Irish hurler
- Michael Moroney (horseman) New Zealand thoroughbred racehorse trainer
- Mike Moroney (1933–2015), Australian long jumper
- Nick Moroney (born 1972), Australian high jumper
- Robert Moroney (1885–1958), Australian cricketer
- Shane Moroney (born 1989), American soccer player
- Sue Moroney (born 1964), New Zealand politician
- Thomas Maroney (1895–1971), American racewalker
- Tommy Moroney (1923–1981), Irish soccer and rugby player
- Conor Moroney (born 2009)

== See also ==
- Morony (disambiguation)
- Maroney (disambiguation)
- Moroni (disambiguation)
