= Moroni (name) =

Moroni is a given name and a surname which may refer to:

== Given name ==
- Moroni Olsen (1889–1954), American actor
- Moroni Bing Torgan (born 1956), Brazilian politician
- Prophet Moroni, a prophet in the Book of Mormon
- Mack Swain (1876–1935), silent film actor, born Moroni Swain

== Surname ==
- Alice Moroni (born 1991), Italian former professional tennis player
- Andrea Moroni (born 1985), footballer from San Marino
- Angel Moroni, the angel that Joseph Smith said visited him
- Anna Moroni (educator) (1613–1675), Italian educator
- Chiara Moroni (born 1974), Italian politician
- Claudia Moroni (born 1944), birth name of Claudia Mori, Italian actress, singer, and television producer
- Claudio Moroni (1959), Argentine lawyer and politician
- Dado Moroni (born 1962), Italian jazz pianist and composer
- David Lee Moroni (born 1938), Canadian former ballet dancer and teacher
- Edoardo Moroni (1902–1975), Italian Fascist politician
- Ezio Moroni (born 1961), Italian former professional road cyclist
- Gian Marco Moroni (born 1998), Italian professional tennis player
- Giovanni Morone or Moroni (1509–1580), Italian cardinal and bishop
- Giovanni Battista Moroni (1520–1578), Italian painter of the late renaissance
- Gaetano Moroni (1802–1883), Italian writer and official in the papal court who wrote the Dizionario di erudizione storico-ecclesiastica
- Maria Costanza Moroni (born 1969), former Italian high jumper, long jumper and triple jumper
- Matías Moroni (born 1991), Argentine rugby union player
- Paulo Ricardo Moroni (born 1961), Brazilian retired footballer known as Moroni

== See also ==
- Mount Moroni
- Moroni (disambiguation)
- House of Moroni (or Morone), a noble family in Italy
- Morony
