= Maroney =

Maroney is a surname. Notable people with the surname include:

- Denman Maroney (born 1949), American jazz musician
- Jason Maroney (born 1967), Australian shooter
- Jenna Maroney (born 1969), fictional character in the TV series 30 Rock
- Kelli Maroney (born 1965), American actress
- Laurence Maroney (born 1985), American player of American Football
- Mike Maroney (born 1968), American politician
- McKayla Maroney (born 1995), American gymnast
- Nicholas Maroney, Australian basketballer
- Susie Maroney (born 1974), Australian swimmer
- Thomas Maroney (1895–1971), American racewalker

== See also ==
- Moroney
- Moroni (disambiguation)
- Morony
