= Cuff =

Layer of fabric at the lower edge of the sleeve of a garment

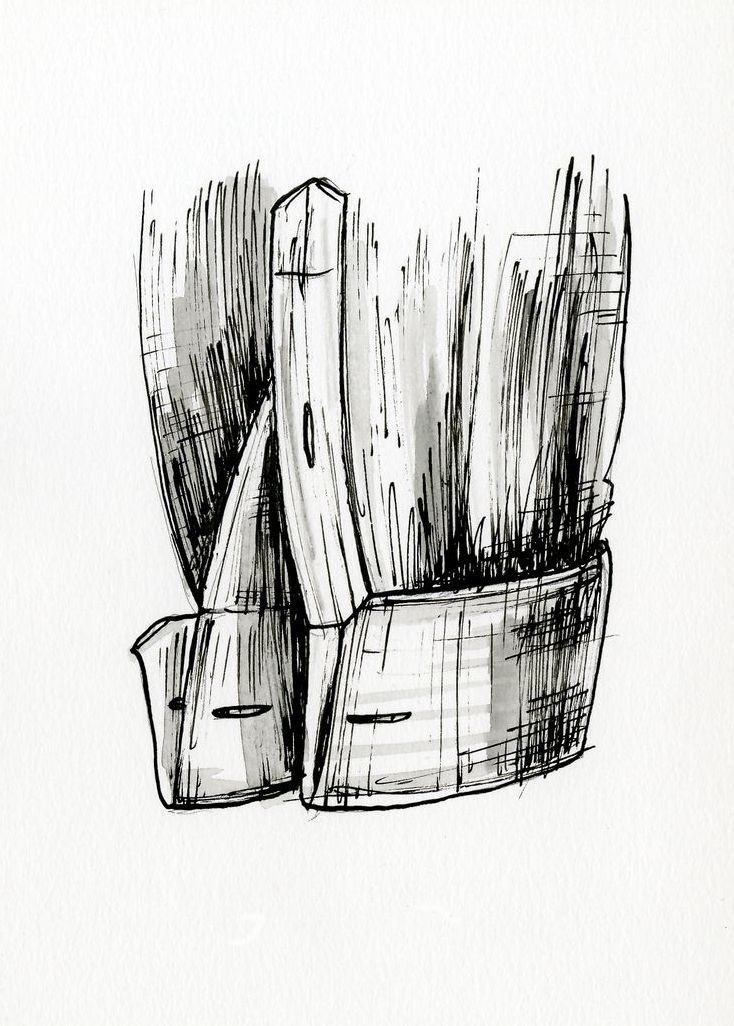
Cuff on a shirt sleeve

A cuff is a layer of fabric at the lower edge of the sleeve of a garment (shirt, coat, jacket, etc.) at the wrist, or at the ankle end of a trouser leg. The function of turned-back cuffs is to protect the cloth of the garment from fraying and, when frayed, to allow the cuffs to be readily repaired or replaced, without changing the garment. Cuffs are made by turning back (folding) the material, or a separate band of material can be sewn on, or worn separately, attached either by buttons or studs. A cuff may display an ornamental border or have lace or some other trimming. In US usage, the word trouser cuffs refers to the folded, finished bottoms of the legs of a pair of trousers. In the UK, while this usage is now sometimes followed, the traditional term for the turned up trouser hem is 'turnup'.

== History ==
Between the 15th and 18th centuries, rich men often wore sleeve cuffs ornamented with fine lace. Catholic clergy have the cuffs of their choir dress ornamented with fine lace.

Paintings showing men wearing decorative cuffs

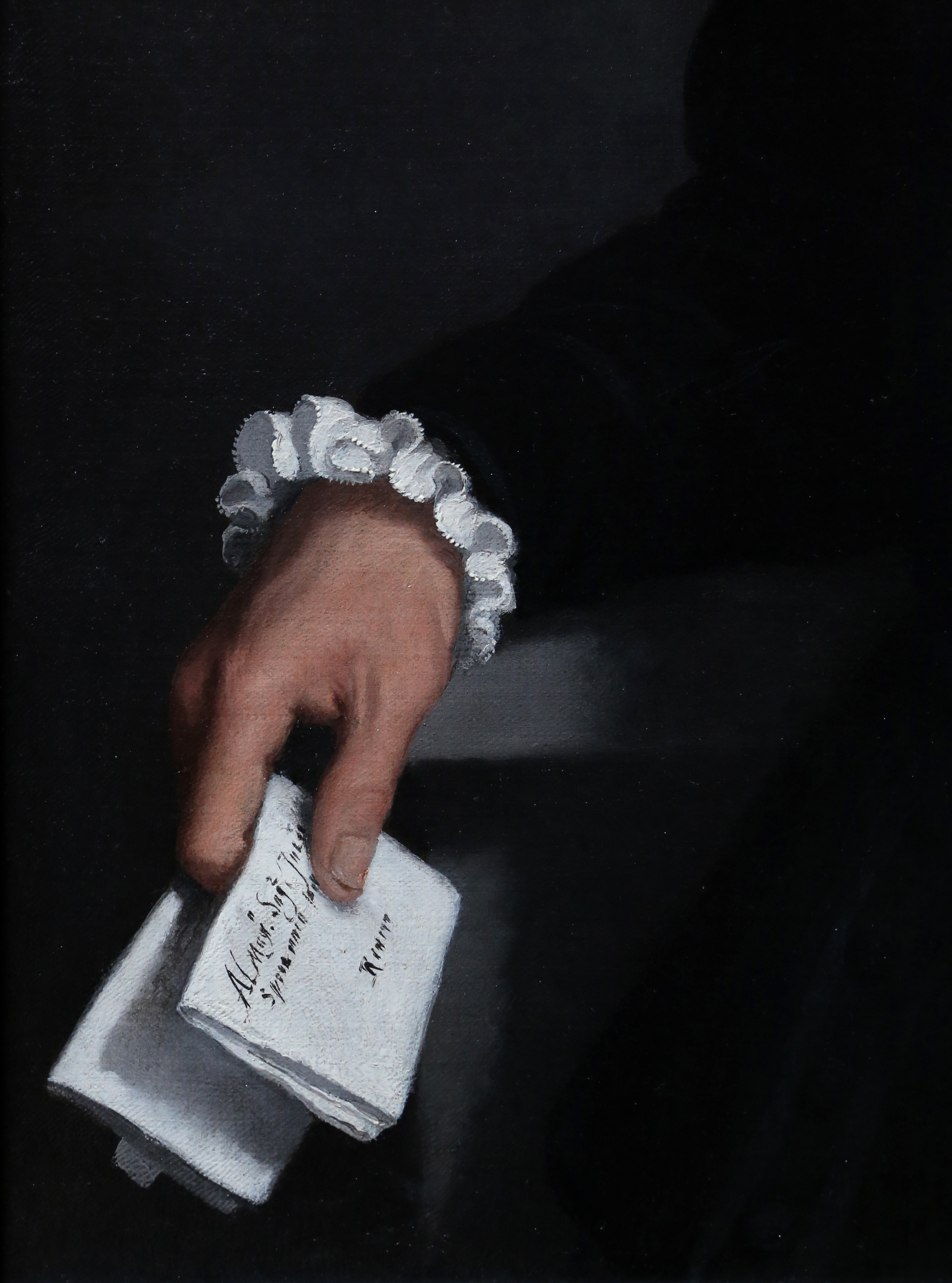
16th-century cuff. Detail from Moroni painting.

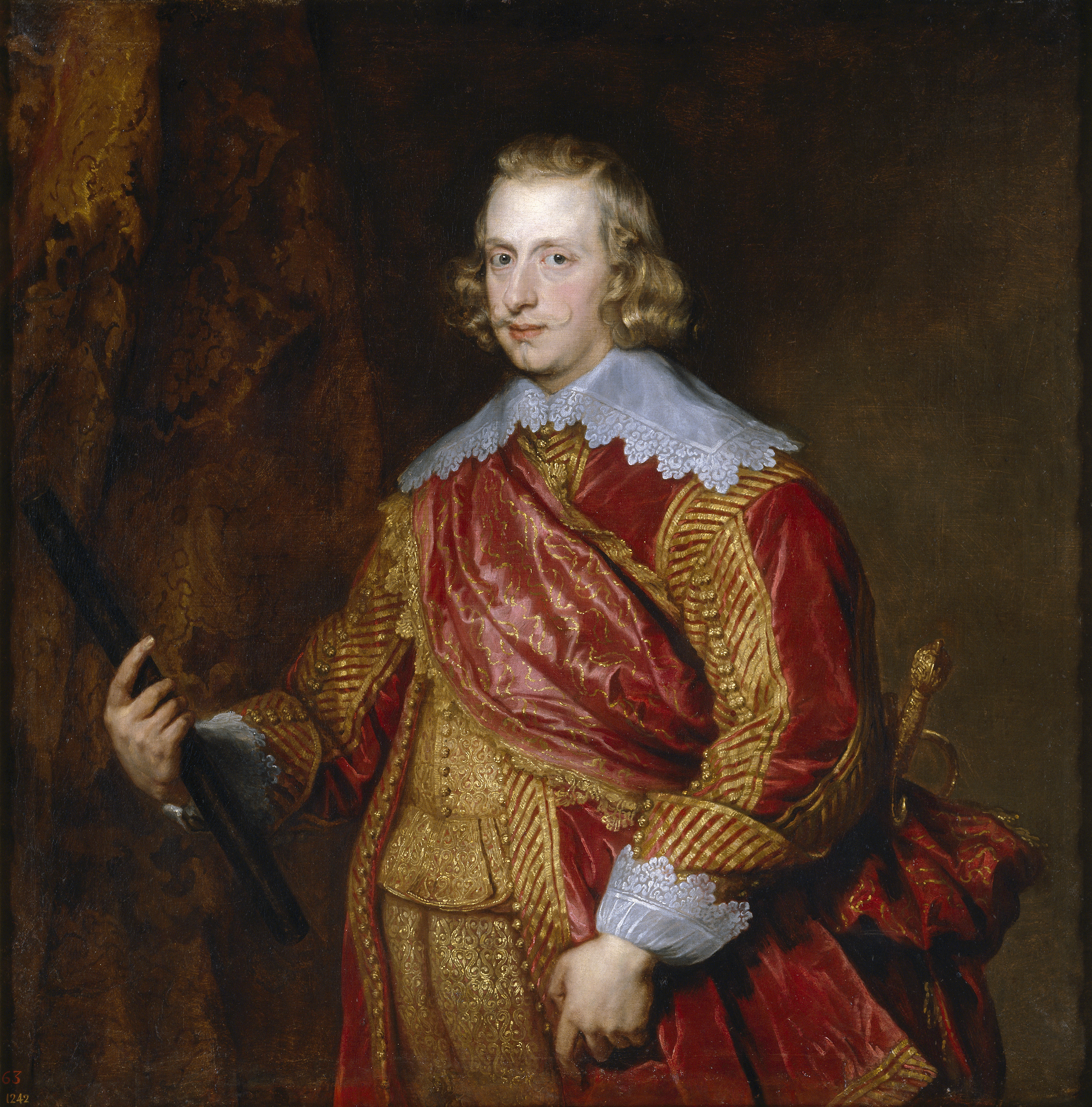
17th-century cuffs

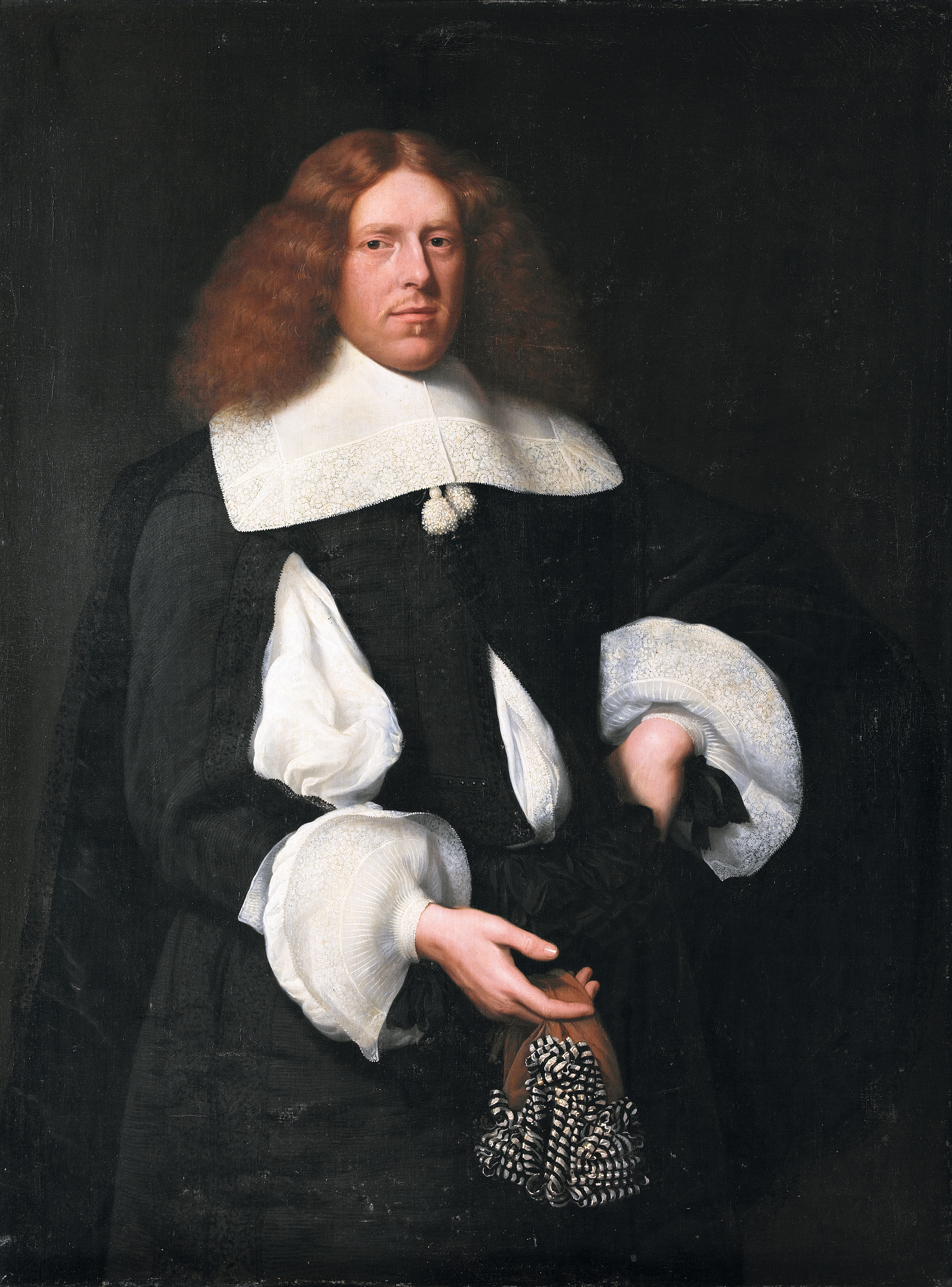
Ornamentation on cuffs in the 17th century.

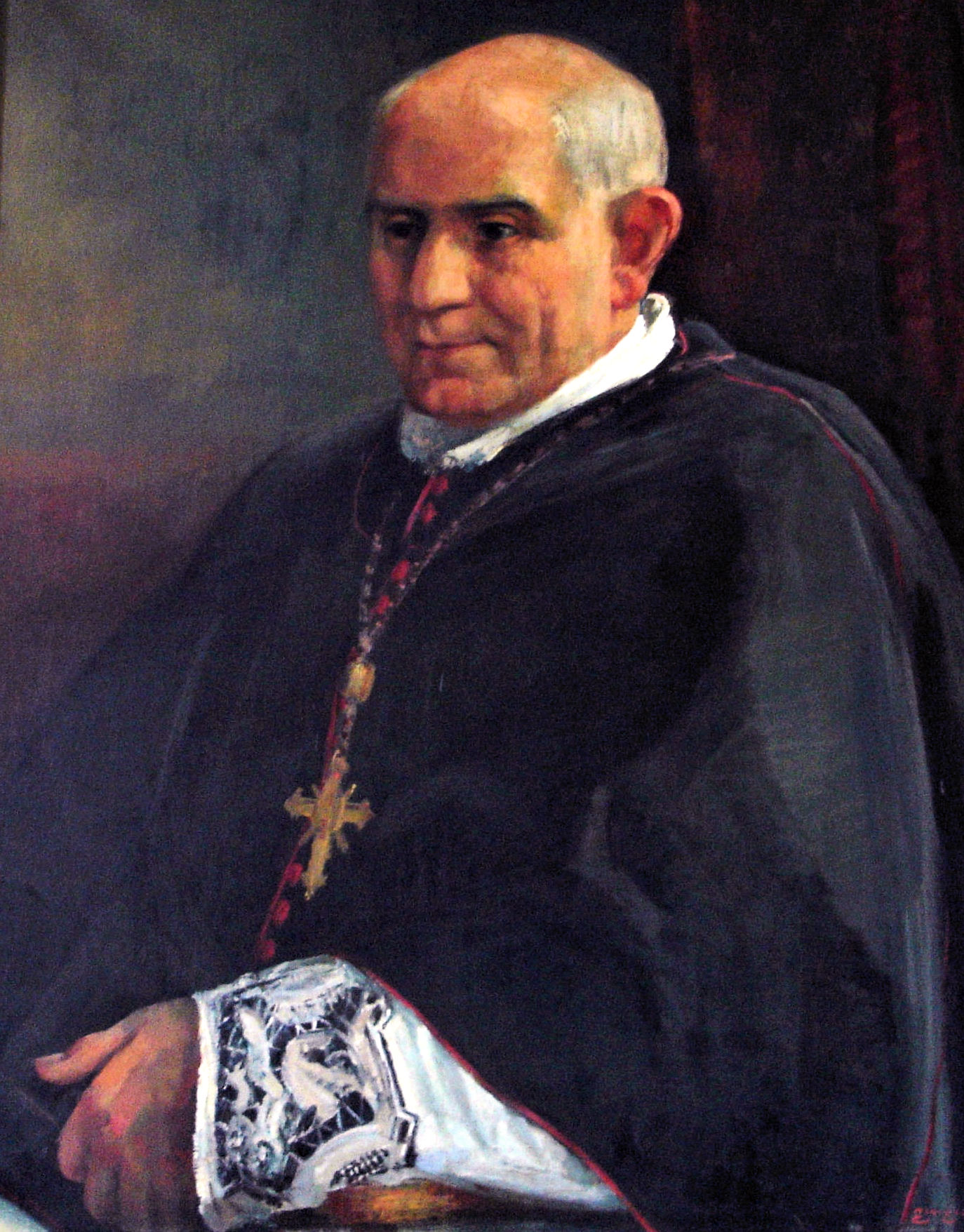
Roman Catholic Canon with ornamented cuff

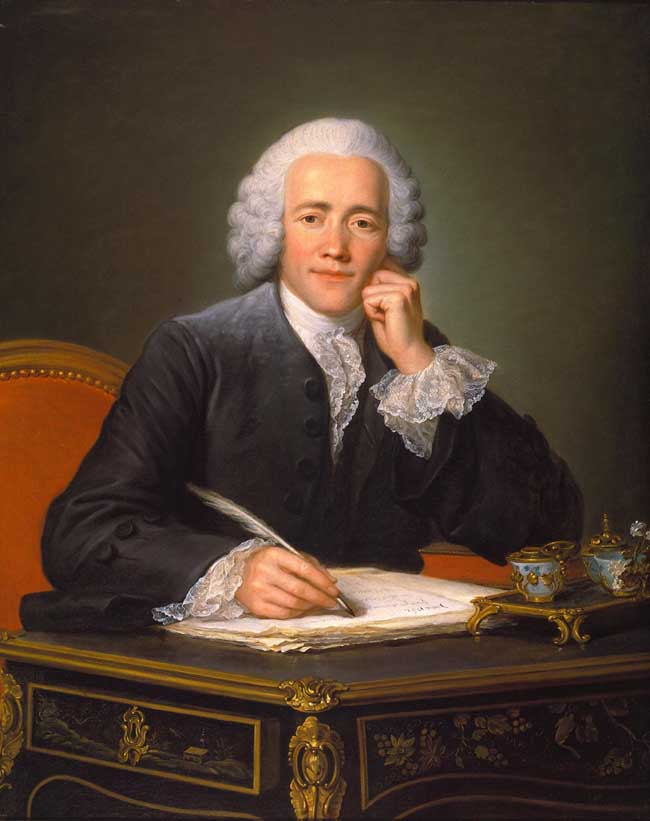
18th-century lace cuffs

== Shirt cuffs ==
Except on casual attire, shirt cuffs are generally divided down one edge and then fastened together - thus wearers can fit a hand through the sleeve when dressing or undressing but also have garments fit more snugly around the wrists. Some sweaters and athletic garments (both tops and pants) have cuffs that either contain elastic or are woven so as to stretch around a hand or foot and still fit snugly, accomplishing the same purpose.

Divided shirt-cuffs are of three kinds, depending on fastening:

- Button cuffs, also called barrel cuffs, have buttonholes on the one side and buttons on the other (sometimes more than one, so that the fit can be adjusted).
- Link cuffs have buttonholes on both sides and are meant to be closed with cufflinks or silk knots. They are most commonly fastened in either the "kissing" style, where the insides of both sides are pressed together, or very unusually with the outer face touching the inner face, as with a button cuff (though this is unorthodox). Link cuffs come in two kinds:
  - Single cuffs, the original linked cuff, are required for white tie and are the more traditional choice for black tie. Some traditionalists may wear this style with lounge suits as well.
  - French cuffs, or double cuffs, are twice as long and worn folded back on themselves. French cuffs were once more common than button cuffs, although they are seeing a resurgence in business wear, particularly in Europe. Even though traditionally French cuffs could only be worn with a lounge suit or more formal clothing (and not with a sports jacket), many people no longer follow this stricture, while some even wear these cuffs without a tie or jacket. They remain the preferred choice for formal and semi-formal occasions. French cuffs should generally be paired with cufflinks.
- Convertible cuffs may be closed with buttons or with cufflinks.

Anatomy of the single or double cuff: The fabric is folded back onto itself, thus the inside of the shirt sleeve becomes the outside of the cuff and the outside of the shirt sleeve becomes the inside of the cuff.

== Trouser cuffs ==
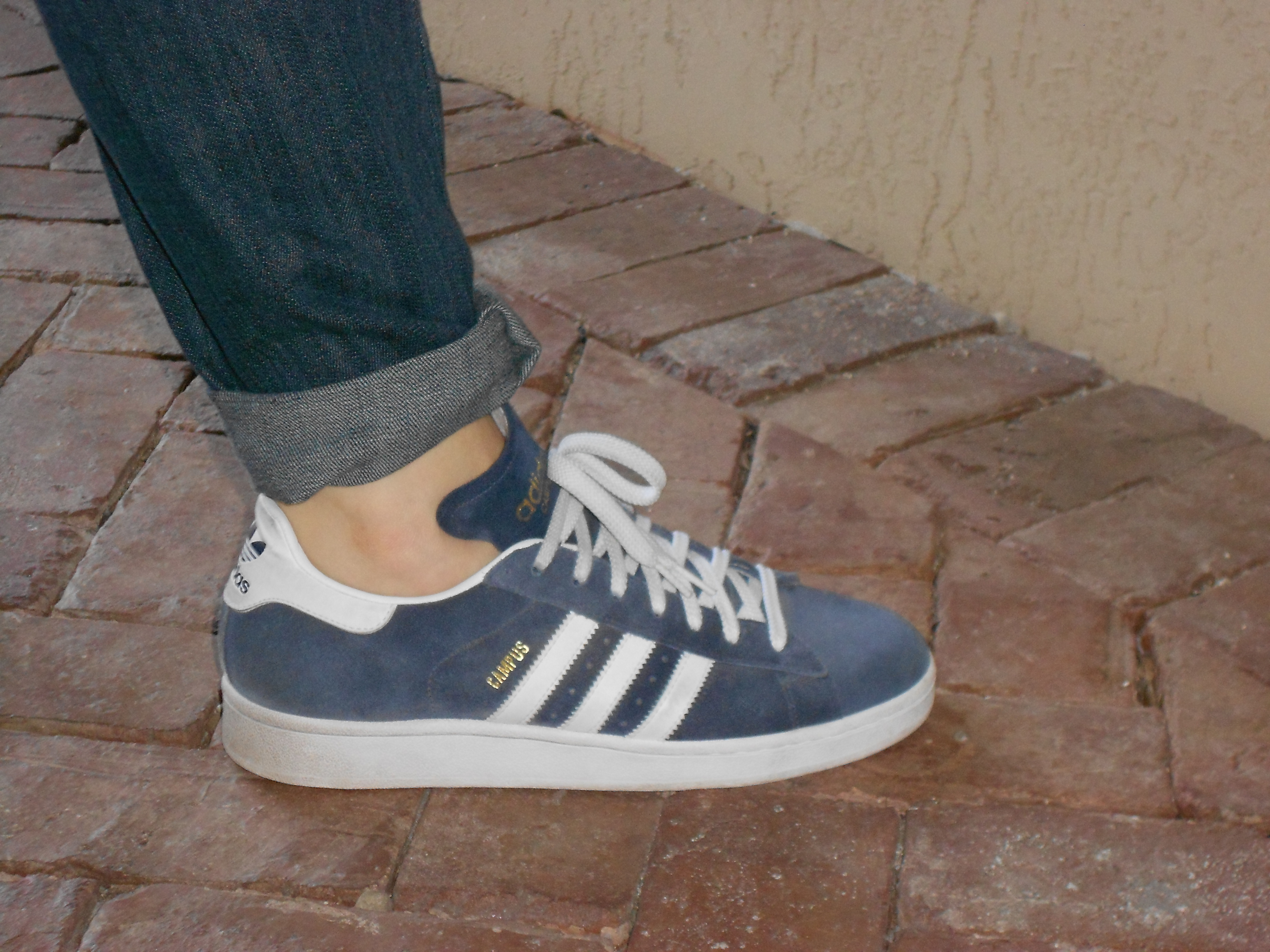
Tight-rolled jeans cuffs

Most trouser legs are finished by hemming the bottom to prevent fraying. Trousers with turn-ups ("cuffs" in American English and elsewhere), after hemming, are rolled outward and sometimes pressed or stitched into place. The functional reason for the cuffs is to add weight to the bottom of the leg, to help the drape of the trousers. Parents may also use cuffs to extend the life of children's clothes by buying pants that are too long, cuffing the leg and then unrolling it as the child grows. Originally, however, it started as men rolling up their trousers to avoid getting mud splashed on them when roads were still unpaved.

In the late 1980s and early 1990s young people in some countries would tightly fold the pant leg longitudinally along the leg, then roll the bottom of the pant leg to "lock" the long pleat in place at the bottom. This was done to slim the appearance of the legs. Reportedly, this "tight-rolled pants" or "pegged pants" fad made a comeback in the 2010s, beginning in London. This was followed by a trend in tailored trousers for younger wearers no longer being made long enough drape and 'break' over the wearer's instep, but to stop at the top of the shoe, avoiding a break.

== Jacket cuffs ==
The buttons and buttonholes at the end of suit jacket sleeves are generally decorative and non-functional. "Surgeon’s cuffs" can be opened at the wrist, and are traditionally associated with bespoke tailoring.
