= Portrait of Alessandro Vittoria =

Painting by Giovanni Battista Moroni

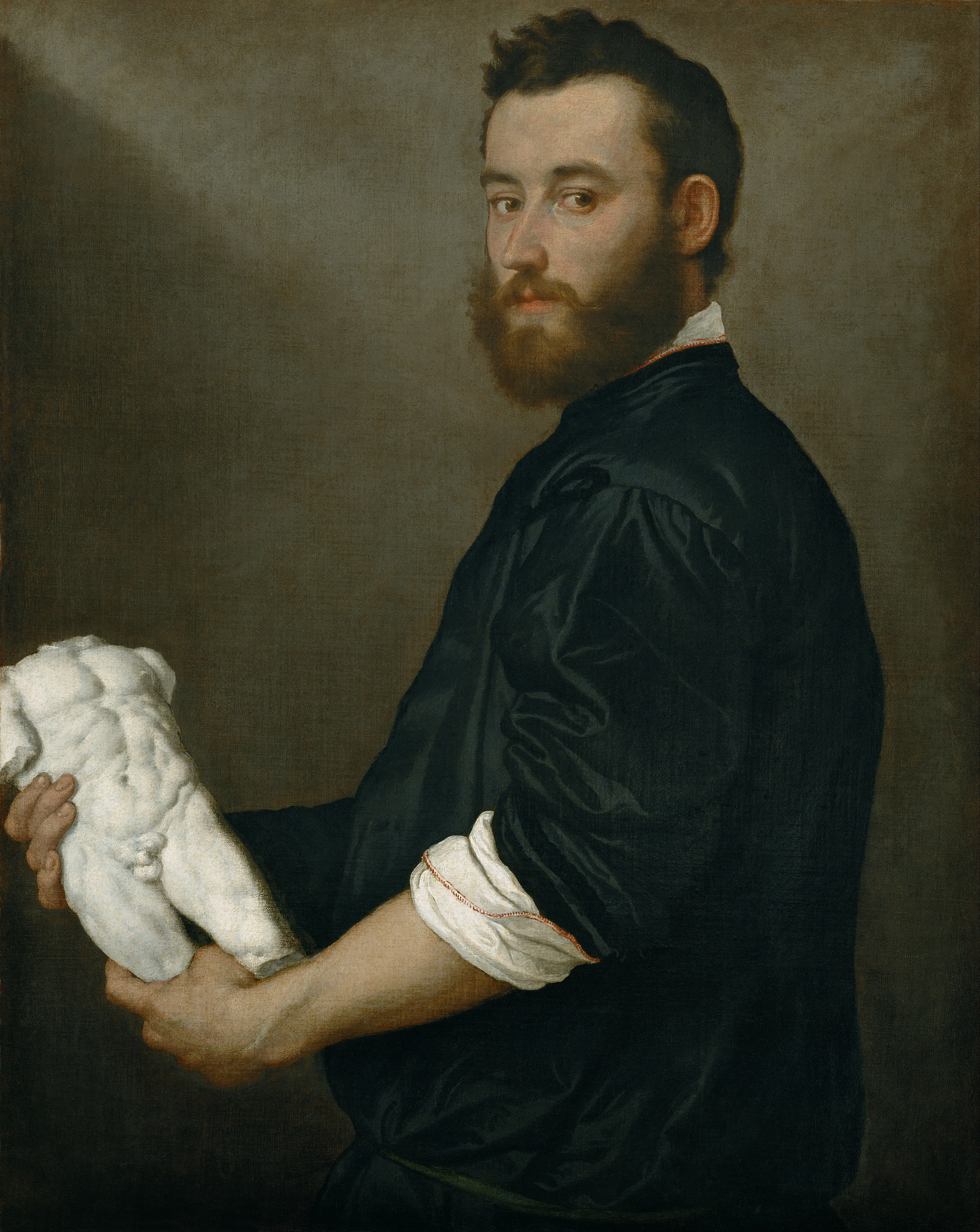
- Artist: Giovanni Battista Moroni
- Year: 1551-1552
- Medium: oil on canvas
- Dimensions: 87.5 cm × 70 cm (34.4 in × 28 in)
- Location: Kunsthistorisches Museum, Vienna

The Portrait of Alessandro Vittoria is an oil on canvas painting created by Italian painter Giovanni Battista Moroni, in 1551–1552. It is held at the Kunsthistorisches Museum, in Vienna.

== History and description ==
The painting is an early work by the artist. The canvas depicts a young man identified with the Italian sculptor Alessandro Vittoria, based on the numerous works that portrayed him. Moroni and Vittoria were both very young at the time of the portrait. Moroni depicts the artist on his working, in a young age, with thick hair, contrary to the later portraits, which depict him older and with a receding hairline. The sculptor wears a shirt with the sleeves rolled up, holding an ancient nude sculpture with both hands, while looks at the viewer. Moroni therefore wanted to indicate the activity of the subject and his interest and respect for classical works. The painting anticipates the depiction of subjects in their working places, of which the best known example by Moroni would be The Tailor, of a more mature age.

The sculptor and Moroni probably met in the years 1551-1552 when they were in Trento. Moroni was in the city at the time of the Council of Trento, to paint the portraits of the two Madruzzo brothers and other personalities who were attending the event. A possible inspiration for the painting was the Self-Portrait Holding a Sculpture, by Tintoretto.

== Provenance ==
The inventories demonstrate that the painting was originally at Vittoria's personal collection. It was Bartolomeo della Nave, from Bergamo, who bought the painting and other artworks, after the sculptor's death, after 1608.

The painting was later part of an art collection that was meant to be sold in England in 1636 by the Viscount Feilding, ambassador in Venice, to his brother-in-law, James Hamilton, 1st Duke of Hamilton. The earl had purchased the canvases belonging to the collection of Bartolomeo della Nave, who was kept in Vienna. The paintings however were never shipped to England. It turns out that in 1651 they were owned by the Archduke Leopold Wilhelm of Austria, as listed in the documentation of 1659, when however the current one was wrongly attributed to Titian. Later it was believed to be the portrait of the architect Jacopo Sansovino. Many years later finally it was considered to be a portrait of Alessandro Vittoria, according to the documentation.
