= Cufflink =

Items of jewelry

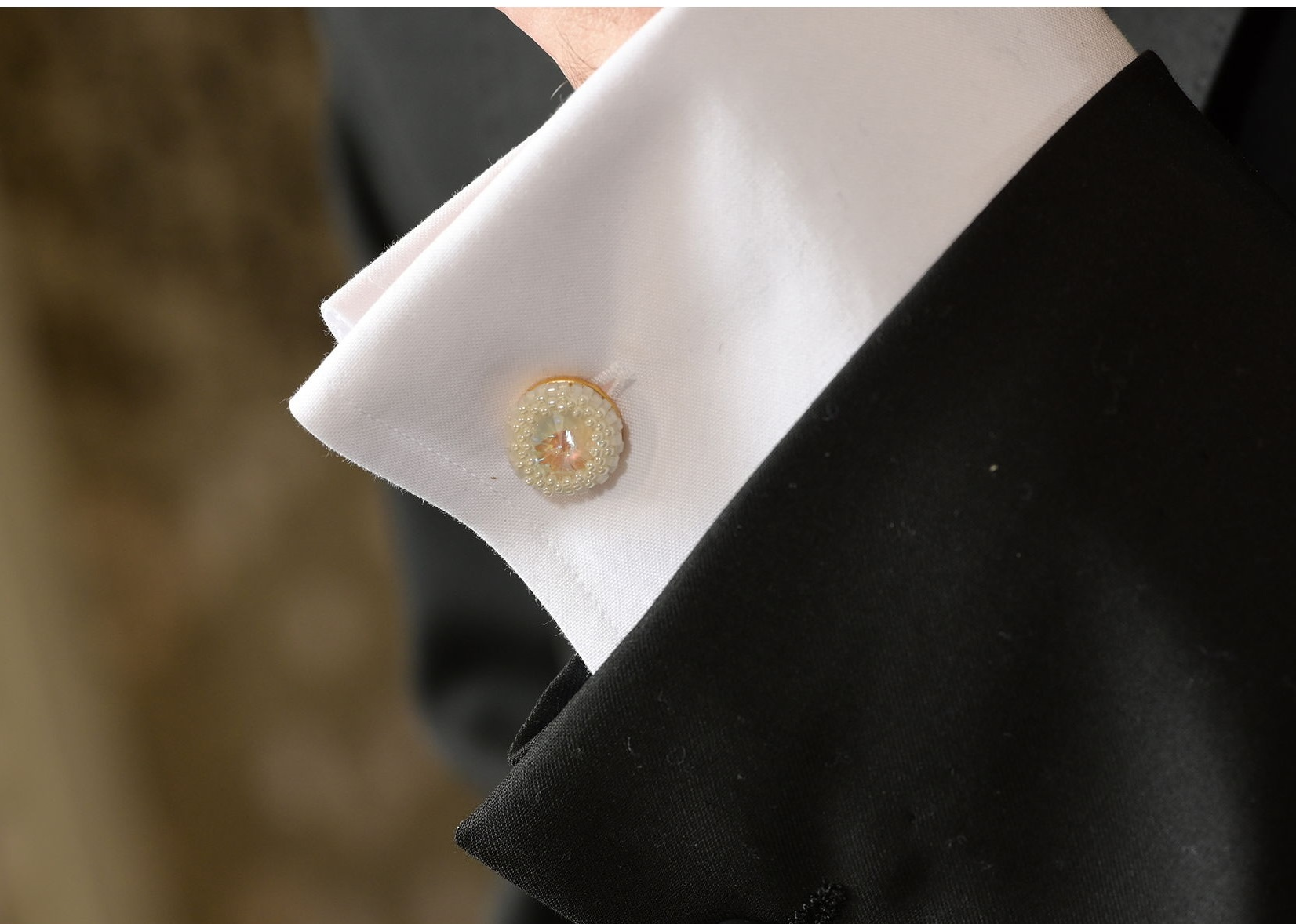
Double cuff with cufflink

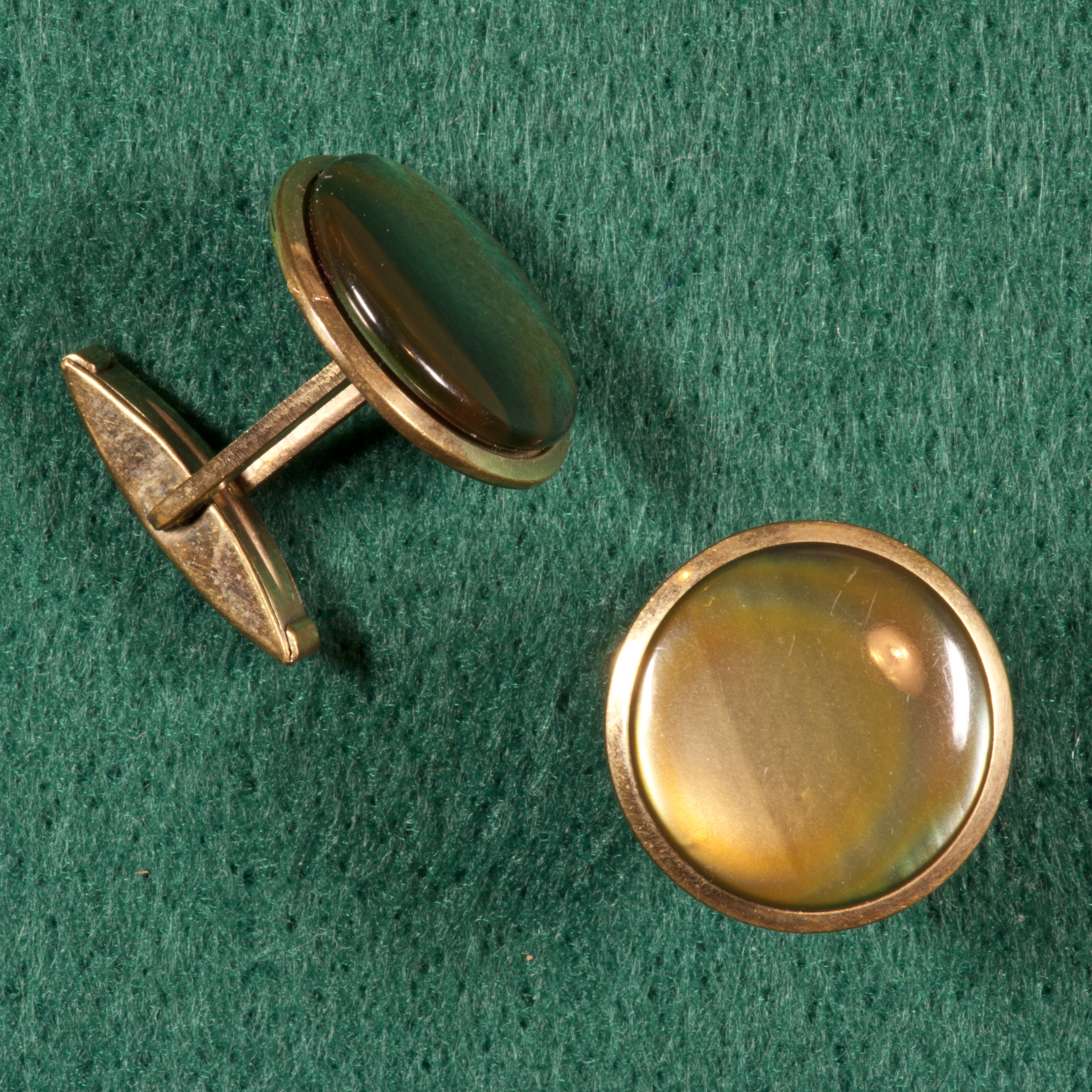
Swivel bar type

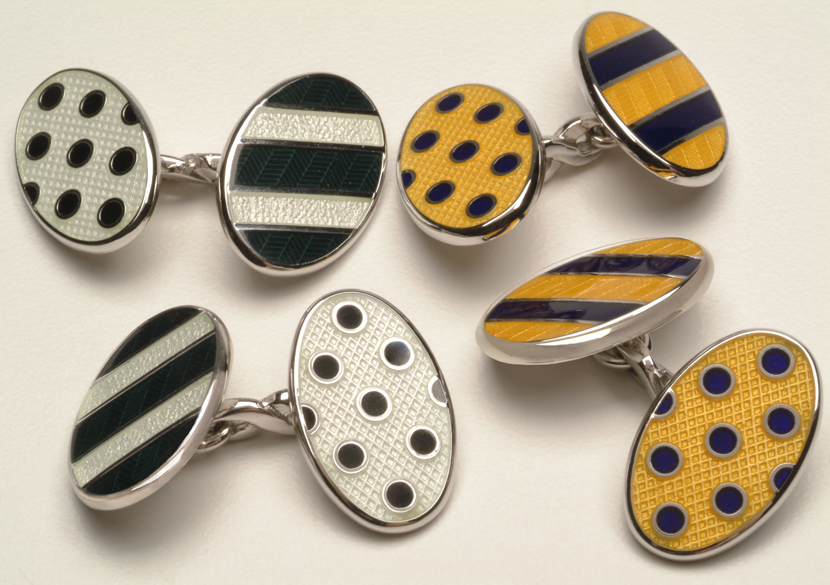
Double-panel type

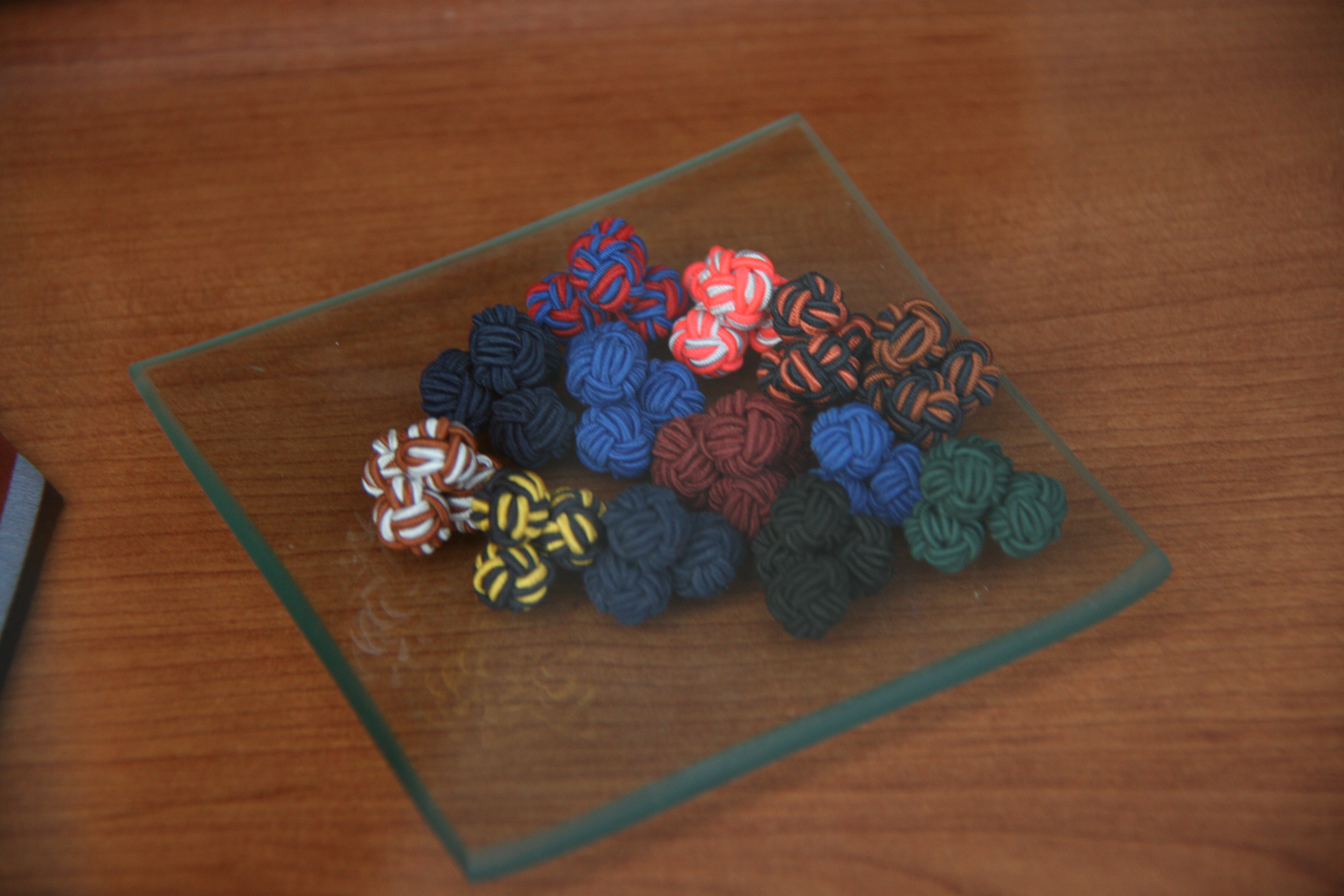
Pairs of silk knot links; they can conveniently be held together as a pair by the elastic when not in use

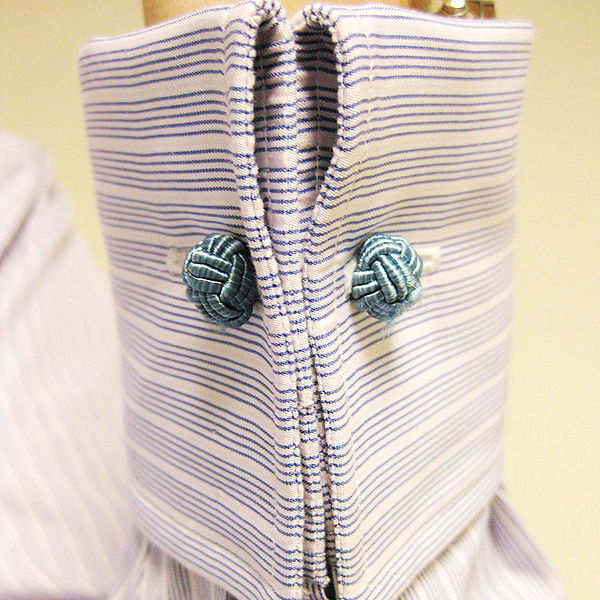
This French cuff is fastened with silk knots.

Cufflinks are items of jewelry that are used to secure the cuffs of dress shirts. Cufflinks can be manufactured from a variety of different materials, such as glass, stone, leather, metal, precious metal or combinations of these. Securing of the cufflinks is usually achieved via toggles or reverses based on the design of the front section, which can be folded into position. There are also variants with chains or a rigid, bent rear section. The front sections of the cufflinks can be decorated with gemstones, inlays, inset material or enamel and designed in two or three-dimensional forms.

Cufflinks are designed only for use with shirts that have cuffs with buttonholes on two sides but no buttons. These may be either single or double-length ("French") cuffs, and may be worn either "kissing", with both edges pointing outward, or "barrel-style", with one edge pointing outward and the other one inward so that its hem is overlapped. In the US, the "barrel-style" was popularized by a famous 19th-century entertainer and clown, Dan Rice; however, "kissing" cuffs are usually preferred.

== Design ==
=== Closing mechanism ===
Cufflink designs vary widely, with the most traditional the "double-panel", consisting of a short post or (more often) chain connecting two circular disc-shaped parts, both decorated. Whale-back and toggle-back cufflinks have a flat decorated face for one side, while the other side shows only the swivel-bar and its post. The swivel bar is placed vertically (aligned with the post) to put the links on and off, then horizontally to hold them in place when worn. The decorated face on the most visible side is usually larger; a variety of designs can connect the smaller piece: It may be small enough to fit through the buttonhole as a button would; it may be separated and attached from the other side; or it may have a portion that swivels on the central post, aligning with the post while the link is threaded through the button-hole and swiveling into a position at right angles to the post when worn.

Links of knotted brightly colored silk enjoyed renewed popularity in the 1990s, joined by an elasticated section because they looked fashionable.

=== Motif ===
The visible part of a cufflink is often monogrammed or decorated in some way, such as with a birthstone or something which reflects a hobby or association. There are numerous styles including novelty, traditional, or contemporary. Cufflinks can and have been worn with tuxedos casual wear, informal attire or business suits, all the way to very dressy styles such as semi-formal (black tie or Stroller), and formal wear (morning dress or white tie), where they become essentially required and are matched with shirt studs. Colorful and whimsical cufflink designs are usually only suitable for casual and relatively informal events. However, formal wear has stricter expectations, with pearl cufflinks being preferred for white tie events. Traditionally it was considered important to coordinate the metal of one's cufflinks with other jewelry such as watch case, belt buckle, tie bar or rings. Sartorial experts prescribe gold to be worn during the daytime and silver for evening wear, but neither expectation is considered as critical as it once was.

=== Fabric cufflinks ===
An alternative type of cufflink is the cheaper silk knot which is usually two conjoined monkey's fist or Turk's head knots. The Paris shirtmaker Charvet is credited with their introduction in 1904. They became quickly popular: "Charvet [link] buttons of twisted braid are quite the style" noted The New York Times in 1908. French cuff shirts are often accompanied with a set of colour-coordinated silk knots instead of double-button cufflinks. They are now often not from silk and consist of fabric over an elasticated core. Owing to the popularity of this fashion, metal cufflinks shaped to look like a silk knot are also worn.

=== Interchangeable cufflinks ===
Interchangeable cufflinks have started to come back into the marketplace in recent years. Cartier introduced their type in the 1960s consisting of a bar with a loop at either end that would allow a motif to be inserted at either end perpendicular to the bar. Cartier referred to the interchangeable motifs as batons. A set including the bars would come with batons made from coral, carnelian, lapis lazuli, rock crystal, onyx, tiger's eye and malachite. Bars would have been made from stainless steel, sterling silver or 18k gold.

Cartier recently re-introduced these interchangeable cufflinks with batons made from striped chalcedony, silver obsidian, malachite, sodalite, and red tiger's eye. The accompanying bars are made from 18k gold or palladium plated sterling silver. The securing mechanism is the same for either series using a small screw inset into the looped end of the bar. The pressure exerted by the screw on the baton holds them in place.

Another type of interchangeable system was created by pranga & co. The cufflink system comes apart allowing the motif, referred to as an Anker, to slide on. Putting the cufflink back together secures the anker into the cufflink allowing it to be worn. Pranga & co's cufflink is simple and similar in concept to charm bracelet bead systems popularized by companies like Pandora Jewelry. The ankers used in the cufflinks are interchangeable with various charm bracelets systems and visa-versa.

== History ==
Although the first cufflinks appeared in the 1600s, they did not become common until the end of the 18th century. Their development is closely related to that of the men's shirt. Men have been wearing shirt-like items of clothing since the invention of woven fabric 5,000 years BC. Although styles and methods of manufacturing changed, the underlying form remained the same: a tunic opened to the front with sleeves and collar. The shirt was worn directly next to the skin, it was washable and thereby protected the outer garments from contact with the body. Conversely, it also protected the skin against the rougher and heavier fabrics of jackets and coats by covering the neck and wrists.

After the Middle Ages, the visible areas of the shirt (neck, chest, shoulder and wrists) became sites of decorative elements such as frills, ruffs, and embroidery. The cuffs were held together with ribbons, as collared, an early precursor of neckties. Frills that hung down over the wrist were worn at court and other formal settings until the end of the 18th century, whilst in the everyday shirts of the time, the sleeves ended with a simple ribbon or were secured with a button or a connected pair of buttons.

In the 19th century, the former splendor of the aristocracy was superseded by the bourgeois efficiency of the newly employed classes. From then onward men wore a highly conventional wardrobe: a dark suit by day, a dinner jacket, or tailcoat in the evening. By the middle of the 19th century, modern cufflinks became popular. The shirt front as well as collar and cuffs covering areas of the most wear were made sturdier. This was practical but when clean and starched, collars and cuffs underscored the formal character of the clothing. However, they could be too stiff to secure the cuffs with a simple button. As a consequence, from the mid 19th century onward men in the middle and upper classes wore cufflinks. The industrial revolution meant that these could be mass-produced, making them available in every price category.

Colored cufflinks made from gemstones and diamonds were initially only worn by men with a great deal of self-confidence, however. This situation changed when the Prince of Wales, later Edward VII, popularised colorful Fabergé cufflinks in the 19th century. During this time cufflinks became fashion accessories and one of the few acceptable items of jewelry for men in Britain and the U.S.

This development continued into the early 1900s, with more cufflinks worn than ever before. These were available in every type of form, color, and material, incorporating both gemstones and less precious stones and glass in cheaper copies. Intricate colored enameled cufflinks in every conceivable geometric pattern were especially popular. All of these were of equal value, as Coco Chanel had made fashion jewelry acceptable to wear. In a parallel development, however, a sportier style of shirt emerged with unstarched cuffs that could be secured with simple buttons.

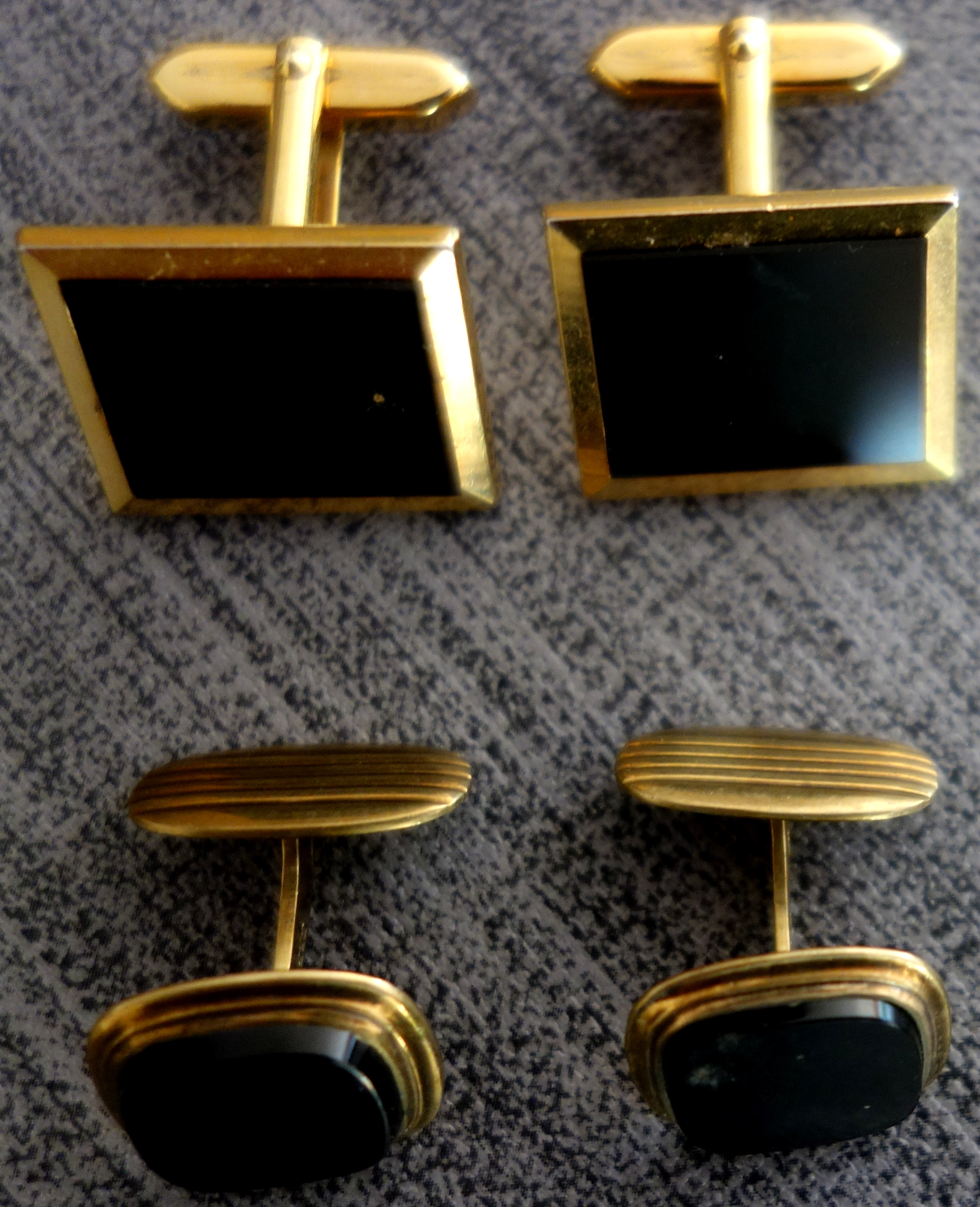
Genuine gold cufflinks with polished onyx made in Pforzheim in the 1960s

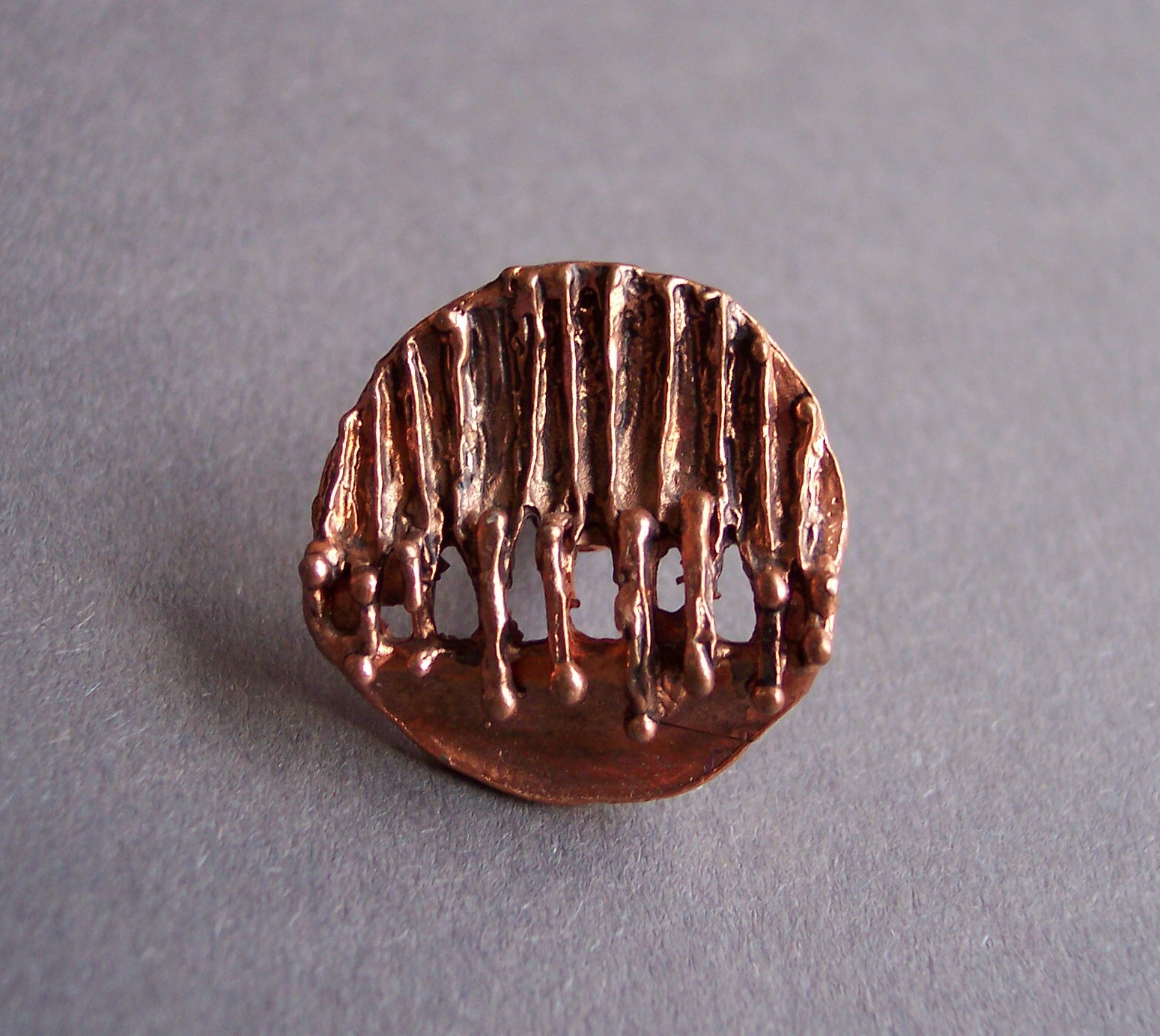
Cufflink made in Idar-Oberstein in the 1960s

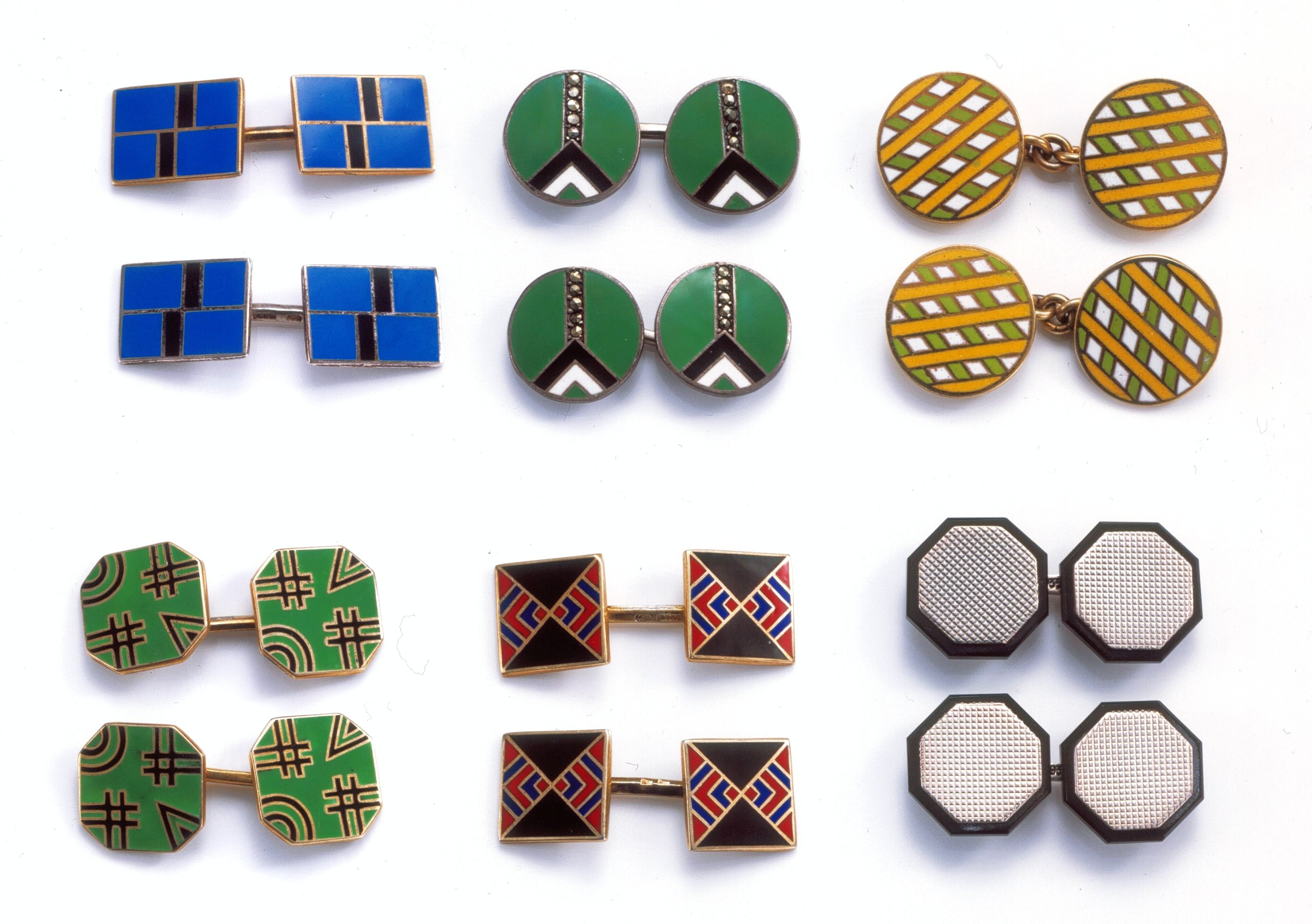
Cufflinks made by Victor Mayer, Pforzheim, in the 1930s

This spread to Europe as well over the same period. In Germany, Idar-Oberstein and Pforzheim were key centers of cufflink production. Whilst in Idar-Oberstein cufflinks were produced using simple materials for the more modest budget, the Pforzheim jewelry manufacturers produced for the medium and upper segments using genuine gold and silver. In Pforzheim, premium cufflinks are still produced today, some of them to historic patterns, some modern, all of them using traditional craftsmanship.

Following the end of shortages related to the Second World War, into the 1950s a gentleman liked to adorn himself with a whole range of accessories, comprising items such as cigarette case, lighter, tie pin or tie bar, watch (now worn mostly on the wrist instead of the pocket), ring, key chain, money clip, etc., an ensemble that also included a wide range of cufflinks.

In the 1970s cufflinks were less emphasized in much of middle-class fashion. Fashion was dominated by the Woodstock generation, with shirts primarily manufactured complete with buttons and buttonholes. Many fine heirlooms were reworked into earrings.

The 1980s saw a return to traditional cufflinks, as part of a general revival in traditional male dress. This trend has more or less continued to this day.
