= The Knight in Black =

Painting by Giovanni Battista Moroni

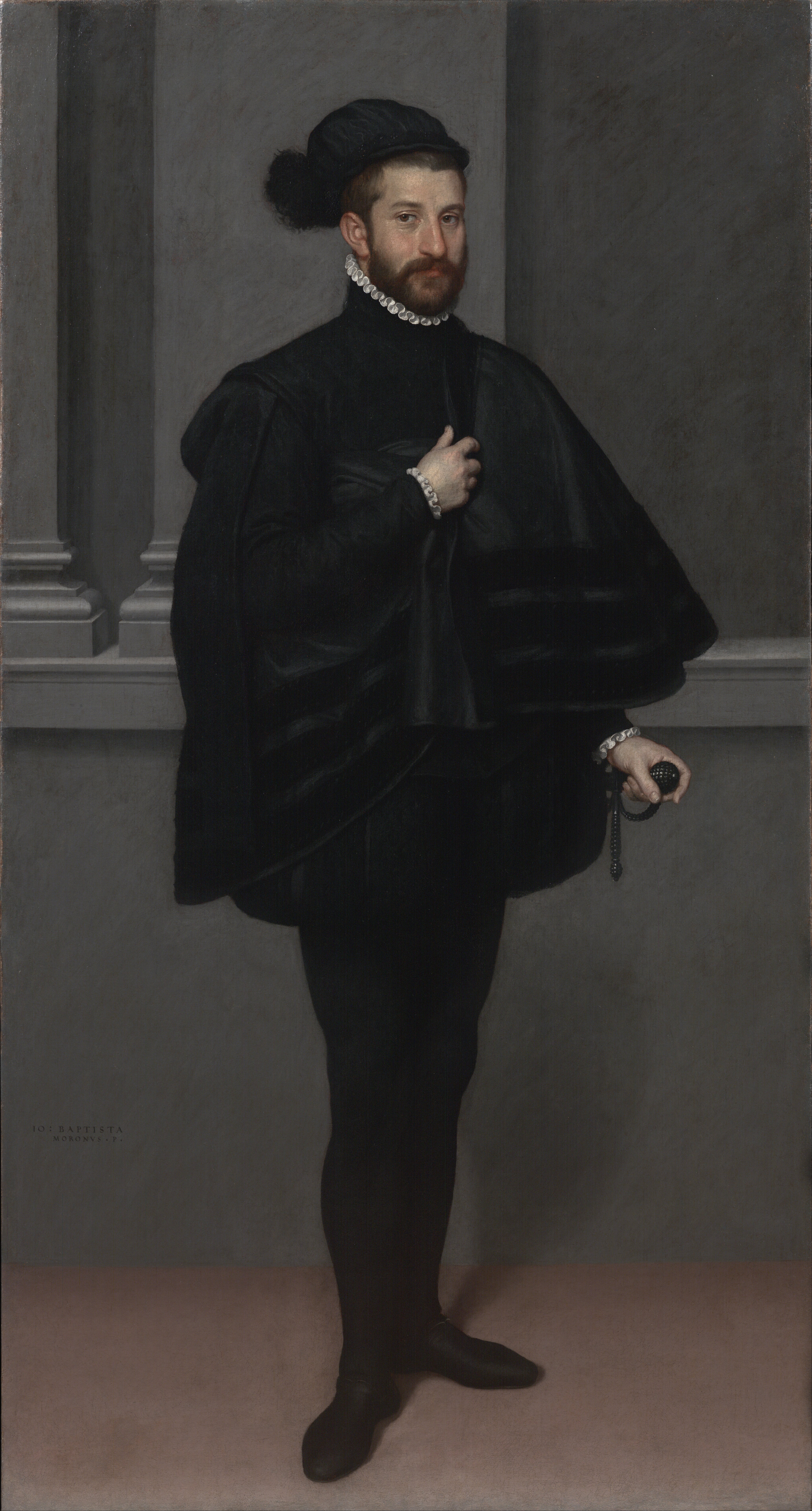
- Artist: Giovanni Battista Moroni
- Year: c. 1567
- Medium: oil on canvas
- Dimensions: 190 cm × 102 cm (75 in × 40 in)
- Location: Museo Poldi Pezzoli, Milan

The Knight in Black is an oil on canvas portrait painting of an unknown male subject by Giovanni Battista Moroni, from c. 1567. It is held in the Museo Poldi Pezzoli, in Milan.

== History ==
The first written reference to the work shows it was probably in Secco Suardo's collection with other portraits produced for his family by the same artist. At the end of the 18th century, it was still in the family, namely with Caterina Terzi Secco Suardo in Bergamo, shortly before passing to Barbara Secco Suardo Mosconi of the same city and then to the latter's husband Giovanni Mosconi. In 1845 it was left to the Moroni counts in Bergamo, before being acquired by Luciano Scotti, son of Giulia Casanova and Annibale Scotti. In 1952 it was moved to Milan, where it remained for ten years before being donated to its present owner.

== Description and analysis ==
As in many other portraits by Moroni of the same time, the subject of the painting is anonymous. He seems to be from the nobility, because of his fine clothing, has a beard and is portrayed standing, life-sized, dressed in black according to the fashion of the time, refined even more by a curled white collar. He has one hand holding the hilt of the sword tied at his waist, while the other hand is on his chest. The clothing has an extraordinary drapery, specially adequated for the composition which is based on a single colour. He wears a black hat on his head, decorated with an elegant and light black feather that stands out diaphanously in the background.

The man is portrayed while looking straight at the viewer, with a confident attitude. He is probably inserted in the context of a house, with the presence of a gray background with pilasters, on which his shadow is also hinted.
