= Morony =

Morony is a surname. Notable people with the surname include:

- Francis Goold Morony Stoney (1837–1897), Irish engineer
- John G. Morony, a banker, after whom the Morony Dam is named
- Michael G. Morony (born 1939), American historian
- Thomas Morony (1926–1989), Master Gunner, St. James's Park, 1983-1988

== See also ==
- Moroney (disambiguation)
- Maroney (disambiguation)
- Moroni (disambiguation)
