= Portrait of Bartolomeo Bonghi =

1553 painting by Giovanni Battista Moroni

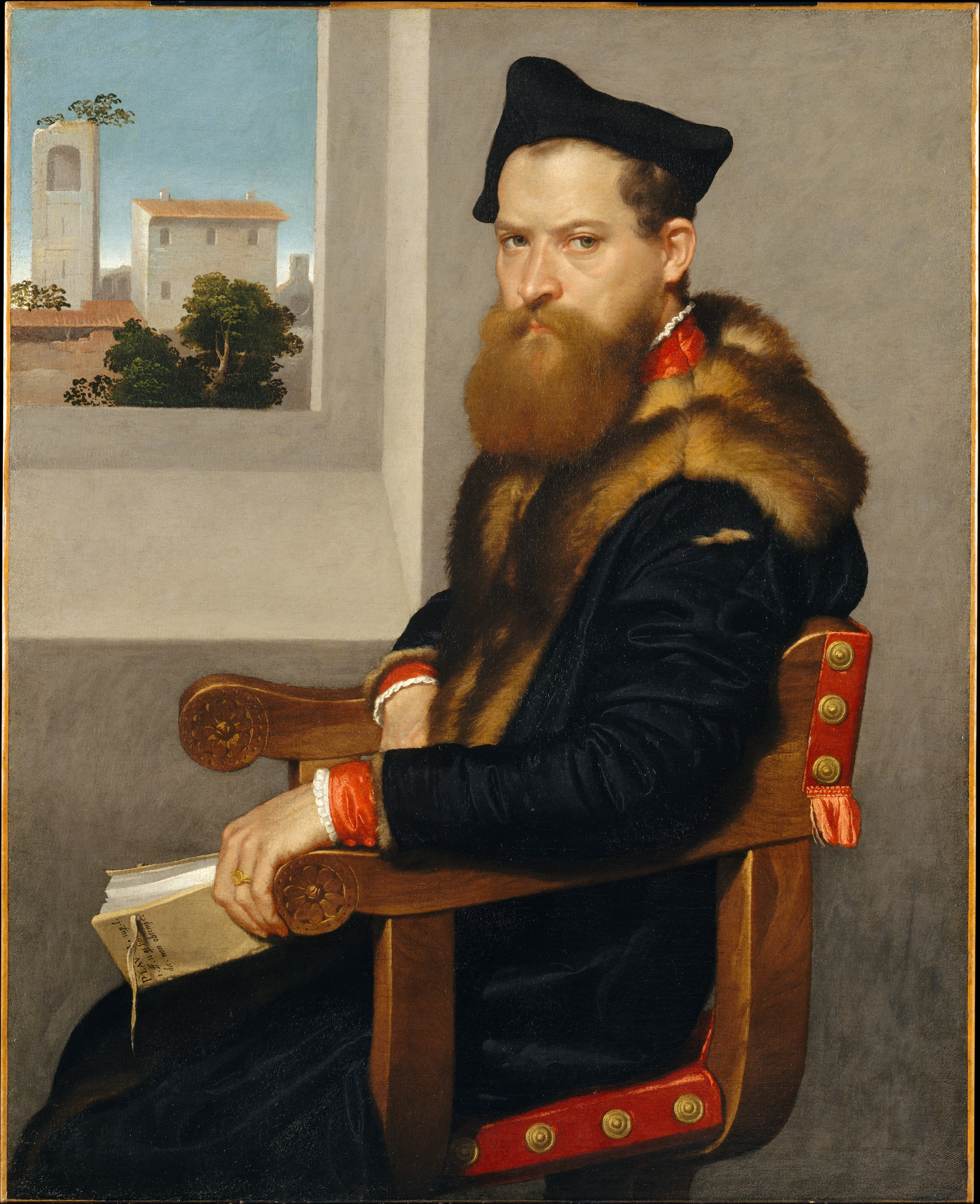
- Artist: Giovanni Battista Moroni
- Year: 1553
- Medium: Oil on canvas
- Dimensions: 101.6 cm × 81.9 cm (40.0 in × 32.2 in)
- Location: Metropolitan Museum of Art; New York

The Portrait of Bartolomeo Bonghi is an oil on canvas portrait by Italian artist Giovanni Battista Moroni, created in 1553. It is held at the Metropolitan Museum of Art, in New York. It depicts Bartolomeo Bonghi, a 16th-century Italian legal scholar. The portrait presents its subject as he was in life; a man of wealth and status. The buildings seen in the top left-hand corner of the painting identify the site of the portrait's sitting as Bergamo in Lombardy.

In the portrait, Bartolomeo Bonghi is dressed in a professorial robe and a hat. He is shown holding a book on Roman civil law.

== History ==
Bonghi was from an important family in Bergamo family. He graduated in civil and canon law, and taught at the University of Pavia. A canon, primicerio of the cathedral of Sant'Alessandro, apostolic prothonotary, count and knight, he was a very important personality in the Bergamo area. The date of his death is found in his will from 27 September 1584.

The painting was seen by Marenzi in the house of the Brembati counts in 1824, and described as bizarre and well preserved. The following year he saw it cleaned and improved his opinion. The peculiarity of the painting also lies in the writing that was placed on the right with the blazon that reads: BONDUS IVD-CAN.US ET PRIMICER.US., CATH.BERG-PROTHONOT.AP[OSTO]LICUS, COMES, ET AEQU.ES. YEAR, DNI.MDLXXXIV. The date would indicate the year of Bonghi's death, posterior to the death of the artist, for this reason Marenzi believed that whoever carried out the restoration added new elements.

A restoration carried in 1991 removed the coat of arms and the writing on the right side, which was certainly out of date, and restored the painting to his original fullness, but eliminated a part of its history.

== Description ==
The canvas depicting Bartolomeo Bonghi is considered one of the best portraits of Moroni, and is a tribute to the subject's position as rector in 1563, who is highlighted in every detail, by the book that he holds in his hand, to the configuration of the landscape seen from the window, and his youthful age.

Bonghi is depicted in a three-quarter view, sitting on a chair, with a frontal gaze, turned towards the observer, in the act of having temporarily interrupted the reading of the book he holds in his hand, apparently disturbed by a presence. His curly hair escapes from his headdress, and his reddish beard is thick and well-groomed. The subject is certainly a man of public importance.

On the title page of the book the writing PLAV I. sup.I can be read. / I.ff.si q[ui]s Ius / dic[enti]. non obtempe[raverit], would indicate that it is a work of Camillo Plauzio Pezone, an ordinary professor of civil law in Pavia, published in 1553, the year when Bonghi was university rector. Moroni therefore pays homage to his office, even if it dates back to before the creation of the painting. This detail would create difficulties in the correct dating of the painting, which however, due to its material and quality characteristics, can be traced to 1561–1562.

Moroni takes great care to the depiction of the details of the prelate's clothing. He wears a rich black satin tunic, adorned with a large fur from where the white profiles of the curled collar and shirt appear. On his head he wears a rather floppy cap in the shape of a velvet tricorn.

To the right of the subject there is a bright window where are visible the tower of the town hall and the nearby buildings. The tower is shown in a state of abandonment, to the point that vegetation grows on its top. Certainly at the time of the creation of the painting, the tower no longer had these characteristics, but Moroni wanted to identify the time when Bonghi was rector of Pavia. The whole canvas is therefore a tribute to the Bergamo prelate, who was probably highly regarded at the time of the artist.

== Provenance ==
The canvas was sold to the Englishman S. Jones in 1833. It was sold at a Christie's auction on 8 May 1852 for £246.15 to Mr. Talbot. In 1869, the painting became property of Edward Stanley, subsequently of Langton Douglas and in 1913 was purchased by the Metropolitan Museum of Art.
