= Joe Moroney =

Australian rules footballer

Personal information
- Full name: Edward Patrick Moroney
- Born: 26 April 1890; Goroke, Victoria
- Died: 22 March 1956 (aged 65); Regent, Victoria
- Original team: Prahran District Juniors
- Height: 175 cm (5 ft 9 in)
- Weight: 75 kg (165 lb)

Playing career^{1}
Years	Club	Games (Goals)
1909	St Kilda (VFL)	2 (1)
1910-15; 1918-25	Prahran (VFA)	161 (84)

Representative team honours
Years	Team	Games (Goals)
1911, 1912, 1920	Victoria (VFA)	6 (6)
- ^{1} Playing statistics correct to the end of 1925.

Edward Patrick "Joe" Moroney (26 April 1890 – 22 March 1956) was an Australian rules footballer who played with St Kilda in the Victorian Football League (VFL).

== Family ==
The son of Michael Moroney, and Margaret Moroney, née Wall, Edward Patrick Moroney was born at Goroke, Victoria on 26 April 1890.

== Football ==
=== St Kilda (VFL) ===
He made his VFL debut for St Kilda, against Richmond, at Punt Road, on 31 July 1909.

=== Prahran (VFA) ===
He transferred to Prahran in 1910.

== Death ==
He died on 22 March 1956 "after a long illness".
