= Portrait of a Man Holding a Letter =

Painting by Giovanni Battista Moroni

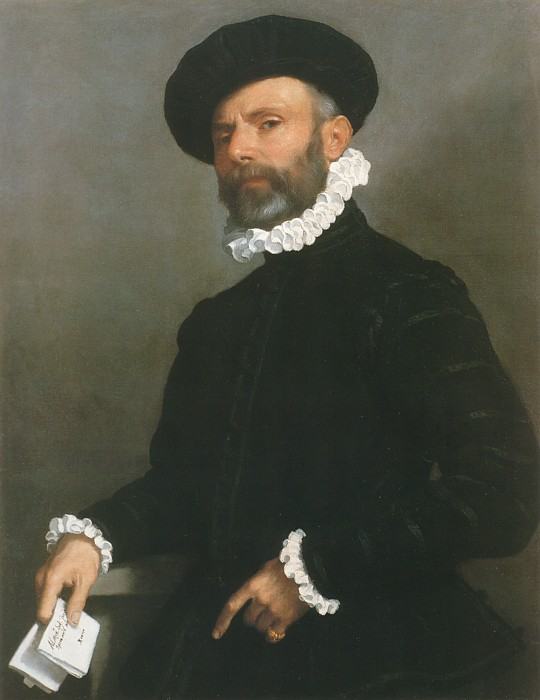
- Artist: Giovanni Battista Moroni
- Year: 1570-1572
- Medium: oil on canvas
- Dimensions: 81.3 cm × 64.8 cm (32.0 in × 25.5 in)
- Location: National Gallery, London

The Portrait of a Man Holding a Letter, also known as The Lawyer, is an oil on canvas painting by Italian painter Giovanni Battista Moroni, from 1570-1572. It is held at the National Gallery, in London. It is considered one of the most representative paintings of the artist's maturity.

== Description ==
The painting was made after Moroni's decade of living in Albino. In this period, he reached artistic maturity in his depictions of ordinary people, artisans and anonymous scholars. The painting was wrongly titled The Advocate, due to a misinterpretation of the note that the subject holds in his right hand. The writing MAG was translated in the past as Magistrato (magistrate) differently from Magnifico (magnificent), like the artist most likely originally intended. Even the word Roman on the sheet as indicated by Italian art historian Mina Gregori it is not a person's name, but a place in Bergamo region, where Moroni had worked.

The portrayed character, whose identity is unknown, perhaps a man of letters, shows a great vitality revealed by the slight rotation of his head and the position of his hands. His face has a vaguely gruff and haughty expression, almost putting the observer at unease. The contained chromatic scale presents the contrast between the whiteness of the ticket he holds, the cuffs and the ruff, with the fully black dress, which allows the evaluation of its velvet fabric, with its folds, shadows and the decorations and the black satin ribbons. The gray-brown background which is slightly illuminated, expresses the truth and the intimacy of the subject, revealed by his gestures.

The softness of the brushstrokes seems to bring Moroni's art closer to Venetian painting, but this canvas is certainly more sparse in material, creamy only for the parts of the face and hands, while for the rest of the portrait, there is a reduction in preparation and pigments of color so as to reveal the texture of the canvas.

== Provenance ==
The painting was in the collection of the Napoleonic general Teodorio Lechi, with the title Portrait of a Knight, according to a catalogue of 1814. It was acquired in 1827, by James Irvine, an English art collector. It was later owned by Alexandre de Portales-Giorgier, a banker of Swiss origin, and later sold by his heirs to Charles Edmond de Pourtalès. It is on display at the National Gallery, in London, since 1865.
