= Giovanni Battista Moroni =

Italian painter (c. 1520/24 – 1578)

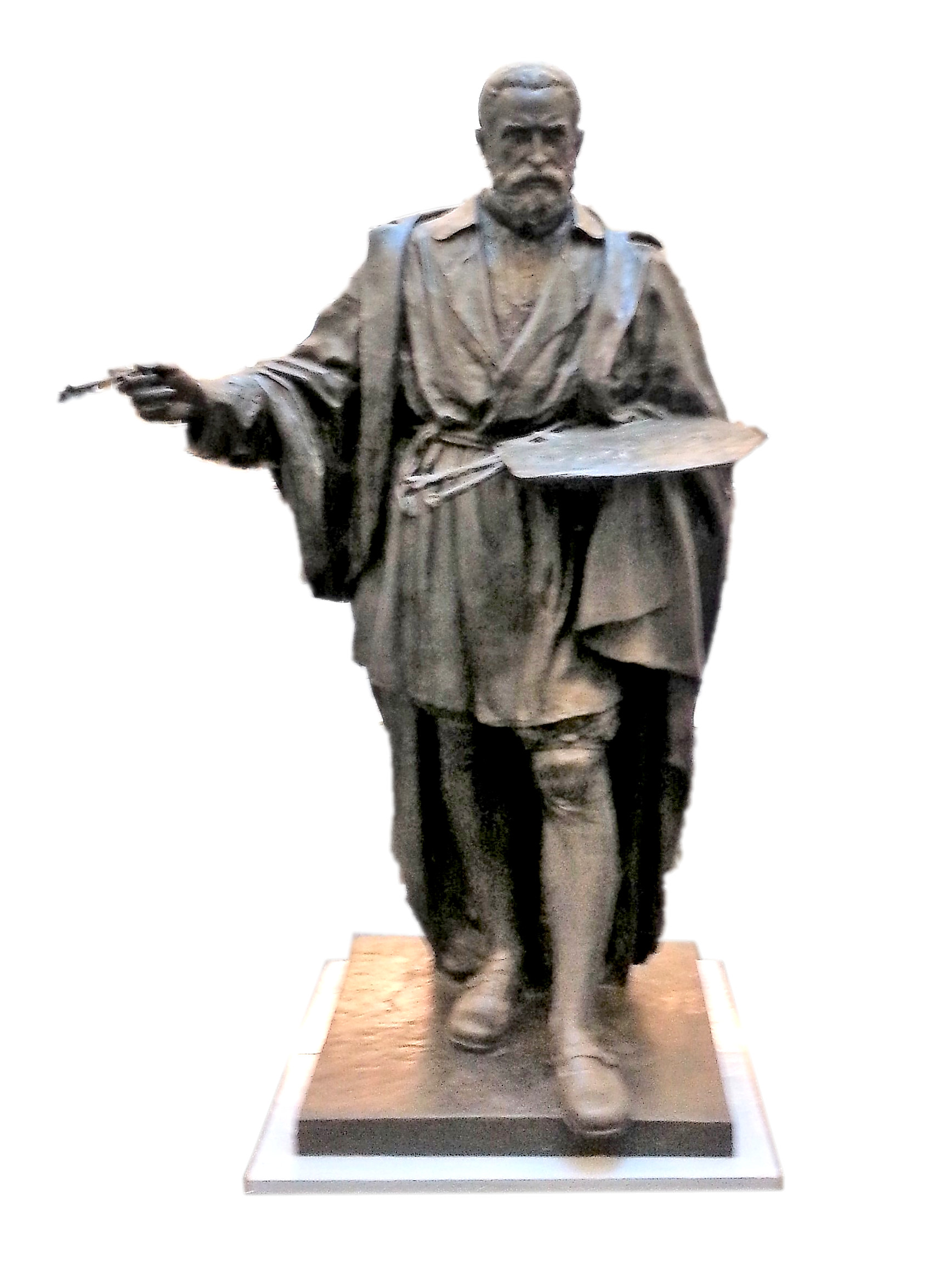
- Giovanni Battista Moroni, in a sculpture by Giuseppe Siccardi
- Born: Giovanni Battista Moroni c. 1520–1524; Albino, near Bergamo
- Died: February 5, 1578; Albino, near Bergamo
- Known for: Painting
- Movement: Mannerism

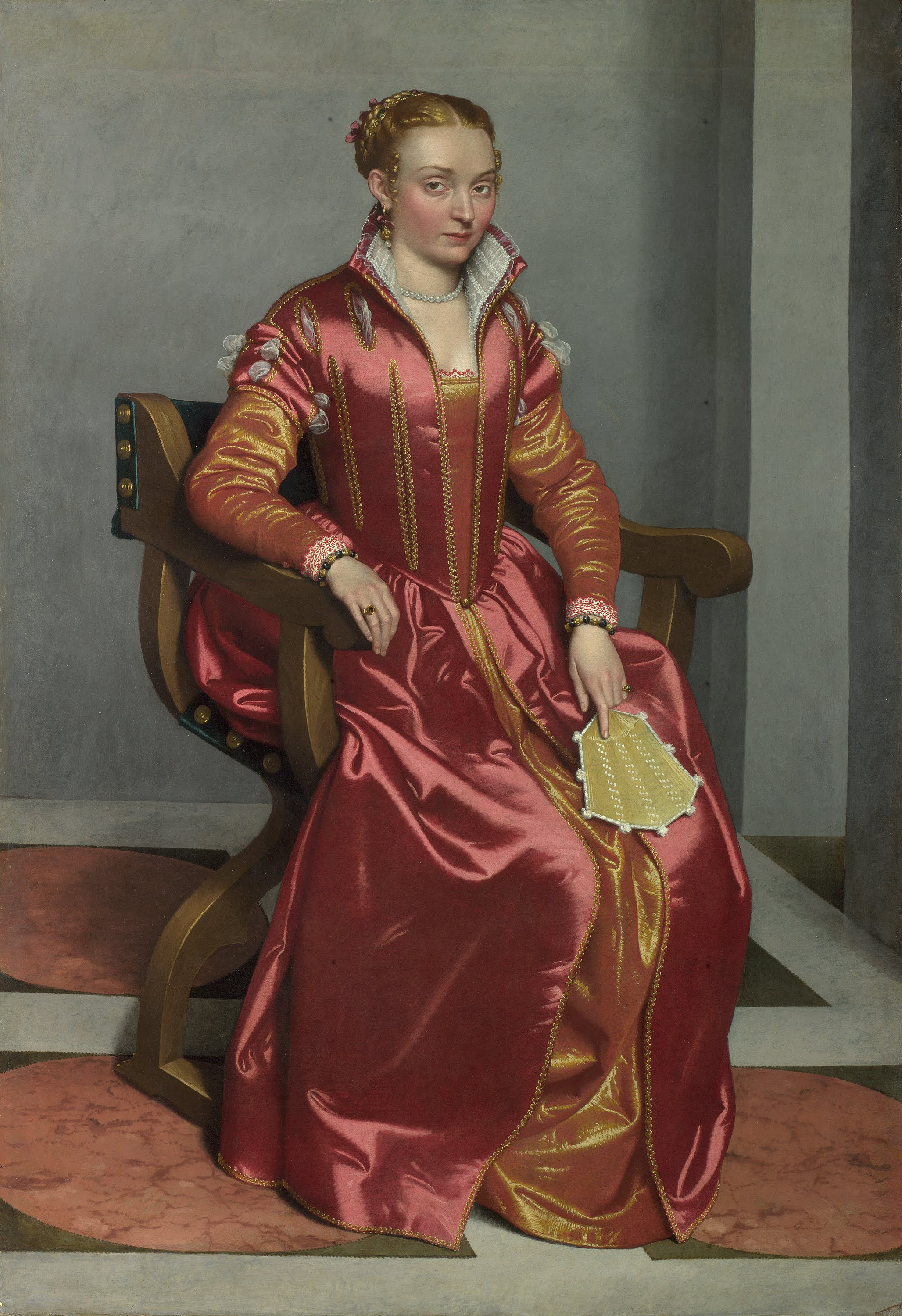
Giovanni Battista Moroni, Portrait of a Lady, perhaps Countess Lucia Albani Avogadro ('La Dama in Rosso')

Giovanni Battista Moroni, also known as Giambattista Moroni (c. 1520–1524 – 5 February 1578) was an Italian painter of the Mannerist school. Best known for his elegantly realistic portraits of the local nobility and clergy, he is considered one of the great portrait painters of the Cinquecento.

== Biography ==
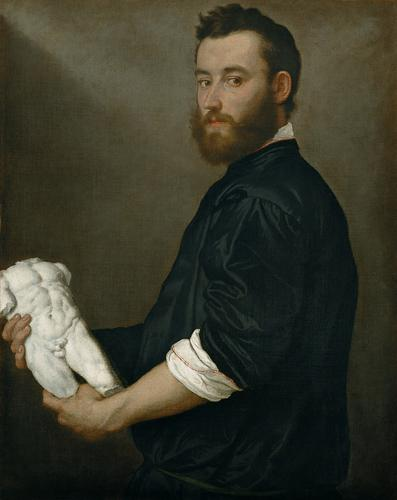
Portrait of Alessandro Vittoria, painting by Giovanni Battista Moroni, 1552-3, Kunsthistorisches Museum

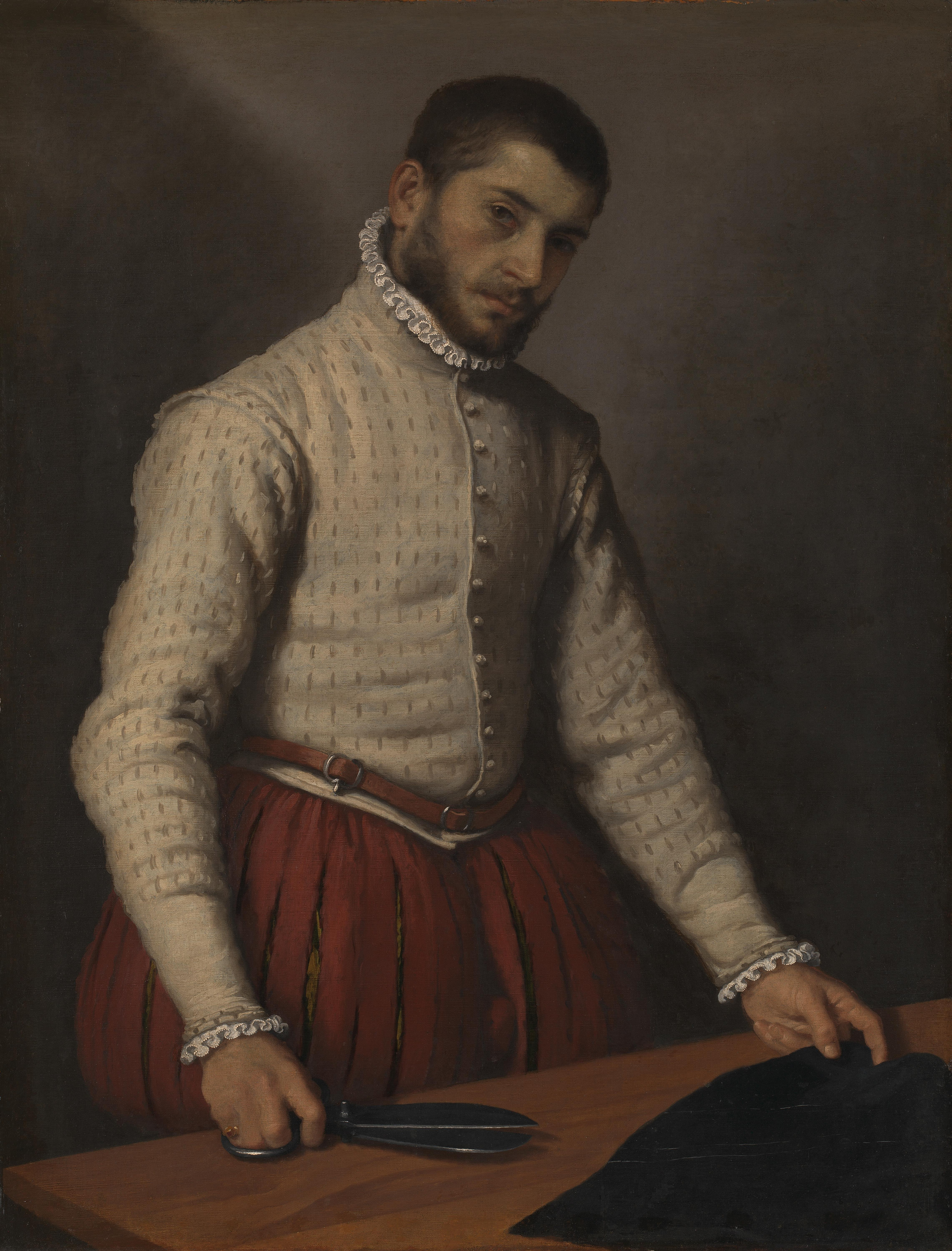
The Tailor, painting by Giovanni Battista Moroni, 1570–1575, National Gallery (London)

Moroni was the son of architect Andrea Moroni. He trained under Alessandro Bonvicino in Brescia, where he was the main studio assistant during the 1540s, and worked in Trento, Bergamo and his home town of Albino, near Bergamo, where he was born and died. His two short periods in Trento coincided with the first two sessions of the Council of Trent, 1546–48 and 1551–53. On both occasions Moroni painted a number of religious works (including the altarpiece of the Doctors of the Church for the church of Santa Maria Maggiore, Bergamo) as well as the series of portraits for which he is remembered.

During his stay in Trento he also made contact with Titian and the Count-Bishop, Cristoforo Madruzzo, whose own portrait is by Titian, but for whom Moroni painted portraits of Madruzzo's sons. There were nineteenth-century claims that he was trained by Titian at Trento, however, it is improbable that he ever ventured to the Venetian's studio for long, if at all. Moroni's period as the fashionable portraitist of Bergamo, nowhere documented but in the inscribed dates of his portraits, is unexpectedly condensed, spanning only the years ca. 1557–62, after which Bergamo was convulsed in internecine strife and Moroni retired permanently to Albino, (Rossi, Gregori et al.) where, in his provincial isolation, he was entirely overlooked by Giorgio Vasari. His output at Bergamo, influenced in part by study of the realism of Savoldo, produced in the few years a long series of portraits that, while not quite heroic, are full of dignified humanity and grounded in everyday life. The subjects are not drawn exclusively from the Bergamasque aristocracy, but from the newly self-aware class of scholars, professionals, and exemplary government bureaucrats, with a few soldiers, presented in detached and wary attitudes with Moroni's meticulous passages of still life and closer attention to textiles and clothing than to psychological penetration.

His output of religious paintings, destined for a less sophisticated audience in the local sub-Alpine valleys, was smaller and less successful than his portraits: "the exact truth of parts nowhere added up, in his altar pictures, even to the semblance of credibility", S. J. Freedberg has observed of their diagrammatic schemes borrowed from Moretto, Savoldo, and others. for example, he painted a Last Supper for the parish at Romano in Lombardy; Coronation of the Virgin in Sant'Alessandro della Croce, Bergamo; also for the cathedral of Verona, SS Peter and Paul, and in the Brera of Milan, the Assumption of the Virgin. Moroni was engaged upon a Last Judgment in the church of Gorlago, when he died. Overall, his style in these paintings shows influences of his master, Lorenzo Lotto, and Girolamo Savoldo. Giovanni Paolo Cavagna was an undistinguished pupil of Moroni, however, it is said that in following generations, his insightful portraiture influenced Fra' Galgario and Pietro Longhi.

Freedberg notes that while his religious canvases are "archaic", recalling the additive compositions of the late Quattrocento and show stilted unemotive saints, his portraits are remarkable for their sophisticated psychological insight, dignified air, fluent control, and exquisite silvery tonality. Patrons for religious art were not interested in an individualized, expressive "Madonna", they desired numinous archetypal saints. On the other hand, patrons were interested in the animated portraiture.

== Public collections with works by Moroni ==
The National Gallery (London) has one of the best collections of his work, including the celebrated portrait known as Il sarto (The Tailor). Other portraits are found in the Uffizi (the Nobleman Pointing to Flame inscribed, "Et quid volo nisi ut ardeat?"), Gemäldegalerie, Berlin, the Canon Ludovico de' Terzi and Moroni's self-portrait; and in the National Gallery of Art, Washington, D.C., A Gentleman in Adoration Before the Madonna, the full-length portrait of Gian Federico Madruzzo, and the seated half-figure of the Jesuit Ercole Tasso, traditionally called, "Titian's Schoolmaster", although there is no real connection with Titian.

Among the public collections holding works by Giovanni Battista Moroni are, the Accademia Carrara (Bergamo) (Portrait of an old man), Ashmolean Museum (University of Oxford), Brooks Museum of Art (Memphis, Tennessee), Detroit Institute of Arts, the Fine Arts Museums of San Francisco, the Hermitage Museum, the Honolulu Museum of Art, Kunsthistorisches Museum (Vienna), the Liechtenstein Museum (Vienna), the Musée du Louvre, Musée Condé Chantilly (Chantilly, France), Museo Poldi Pezzoli (Milan), the Museum of Fine Arts, Boston, National Galleries of Scotland, the National Gallery of Art (Washington, D.C.), The Metropolitan Museum of Art (New York), the Art Gallery of New South Wales, the National Gallery of Canada (Portrait of a Man), the National Gallery, London, the Norton Simon Museum (Pasadena, California), Pinacoteca Ambrosiana (Milan), Pinacoteca di Brera (Milan), Rijksmuseum, the John and Mable Ringling Museum of Art (Sarasota, Florida), University of Arizona Museum of Art, Virginia Museum of Fine Arts, National Gallery of Ireland (Portrait of a Gentleman and his two Children), the Uffizi (Portrait of Giovanni Antonio Pantera), the Prado (A Soldier), and the Worcester Art Museum (Portrait of a Man).

In 2016, ""Portrait of a Man", attributed to the workshop of Giovanni Battista Moroni, was restituted to the heirs of August Liebmann Mayer. The painting had been looted by the Nazis, returned to France and in storage at the Louvre Museum in Paris since 1951."

== Gallery ==
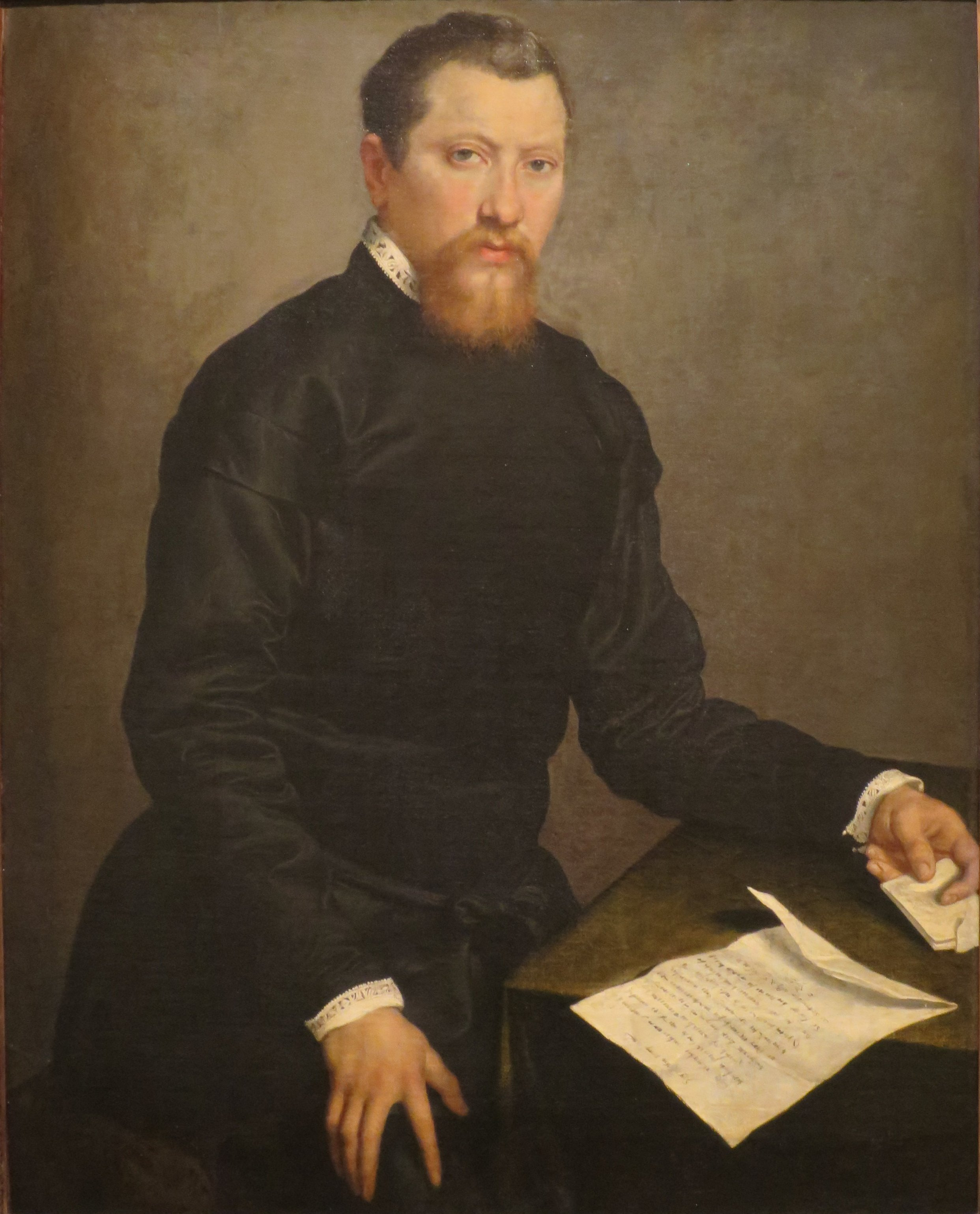
Portrait of a Man, oil on canvas, 1553, Honolulu Museum of Art

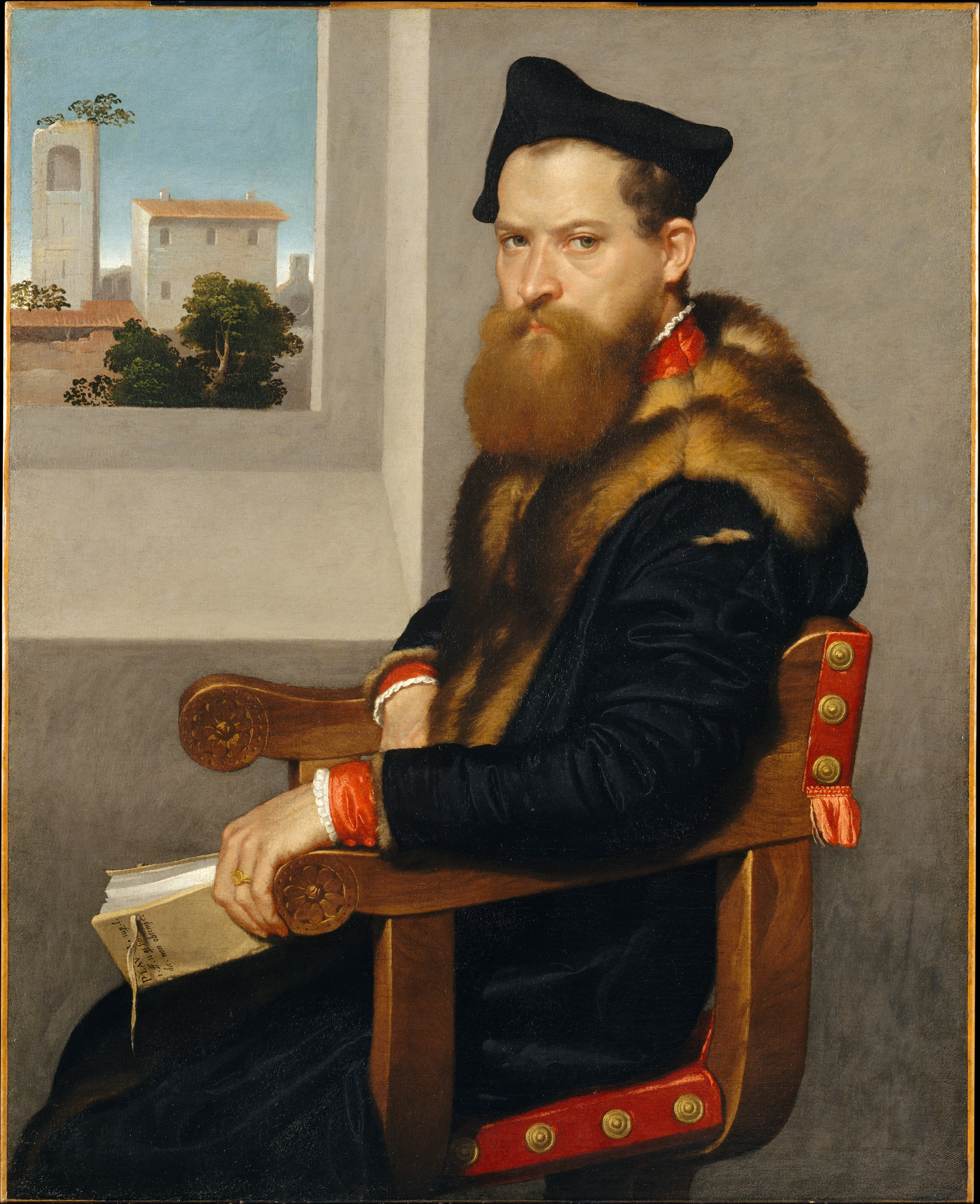
Portrait of Bartolomeo Bonghi, oil on canvas, 1553, Metropolitan Museum of Art

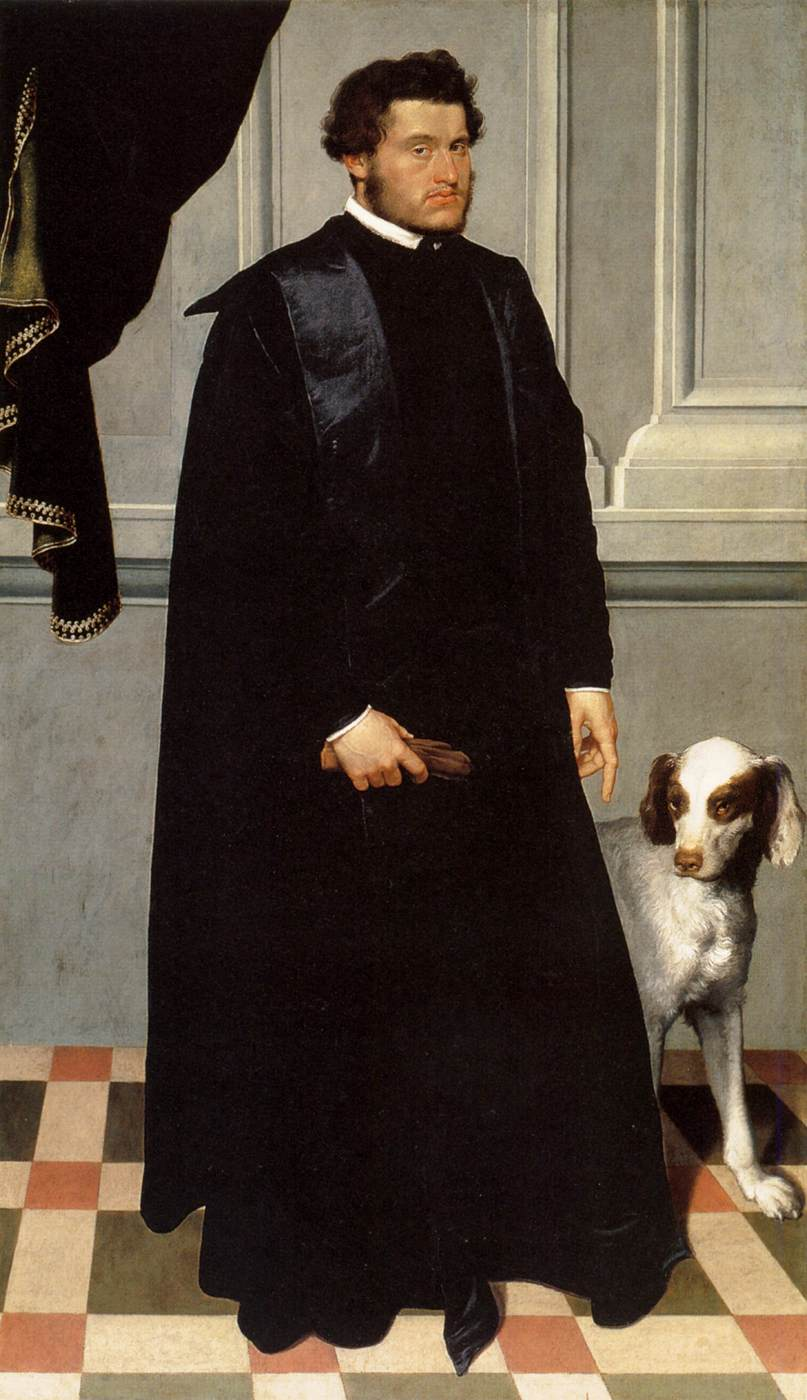
Gian Lodovico Madruzzo - Art Institute of Chicago

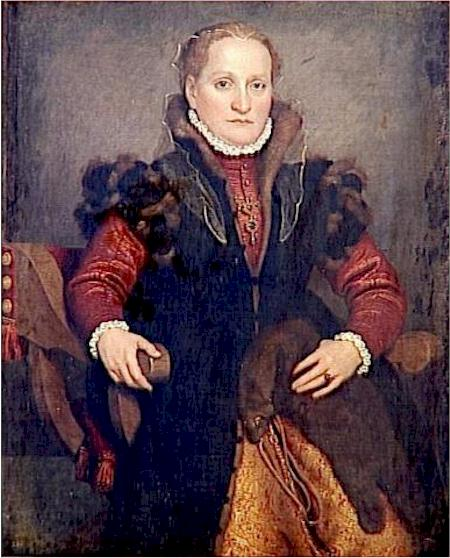
Portrait of Angelica Agliardi de Nicolini, circa 1560, Chantilly, Musée Condé

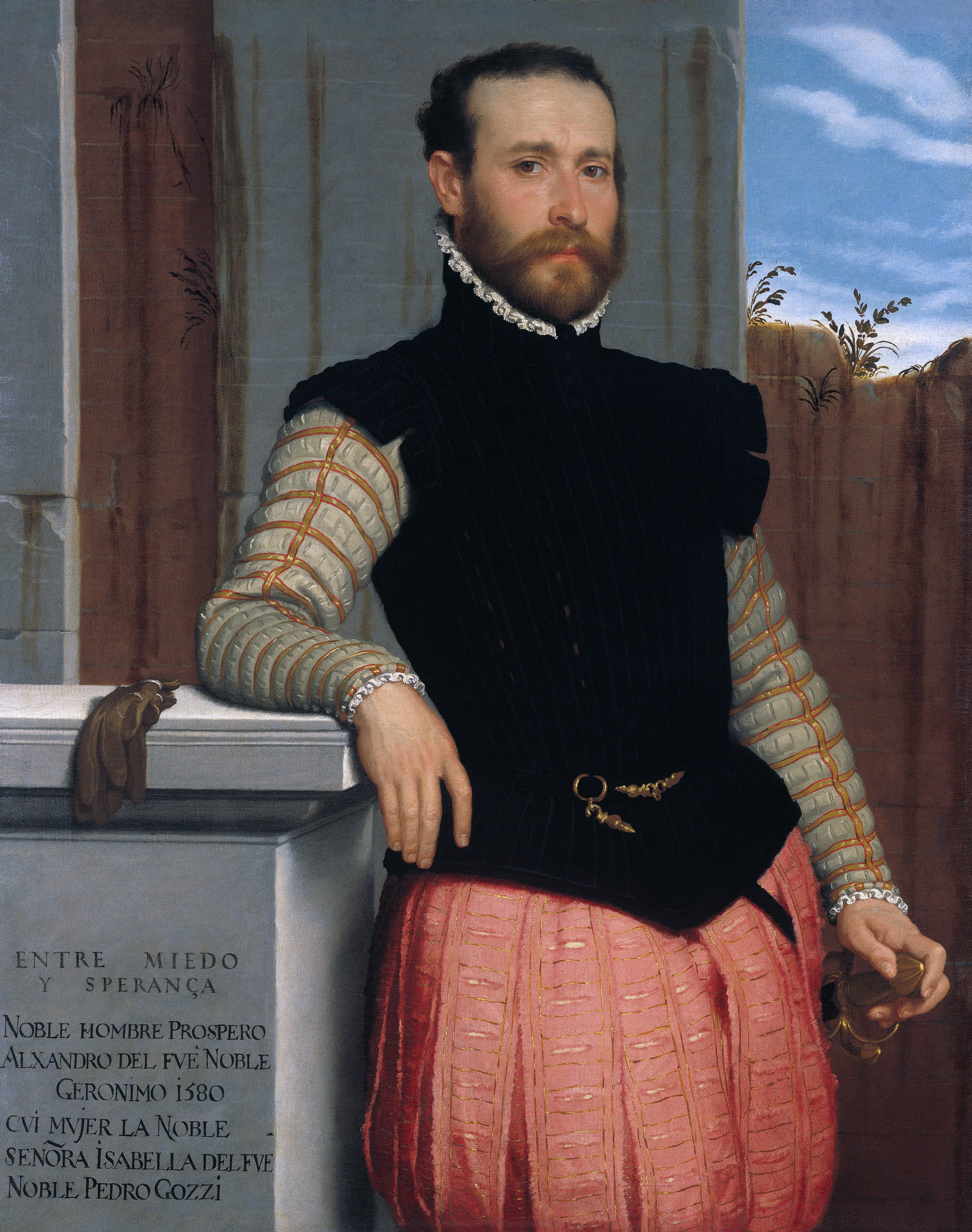
Portrait by Moroni, 1560, the background is very typical

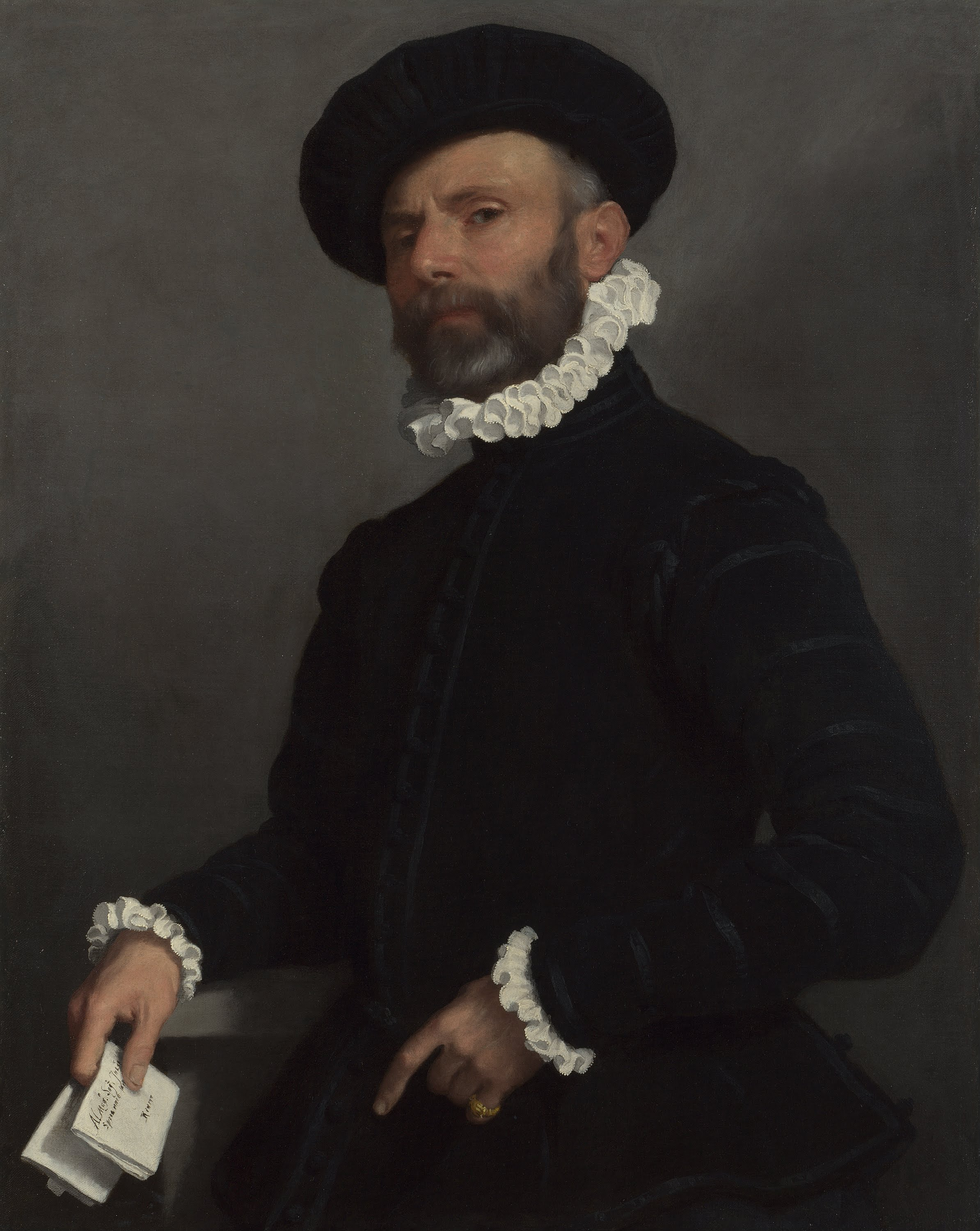
Portrait of a Man Holding a Letter (L'Avvocato)

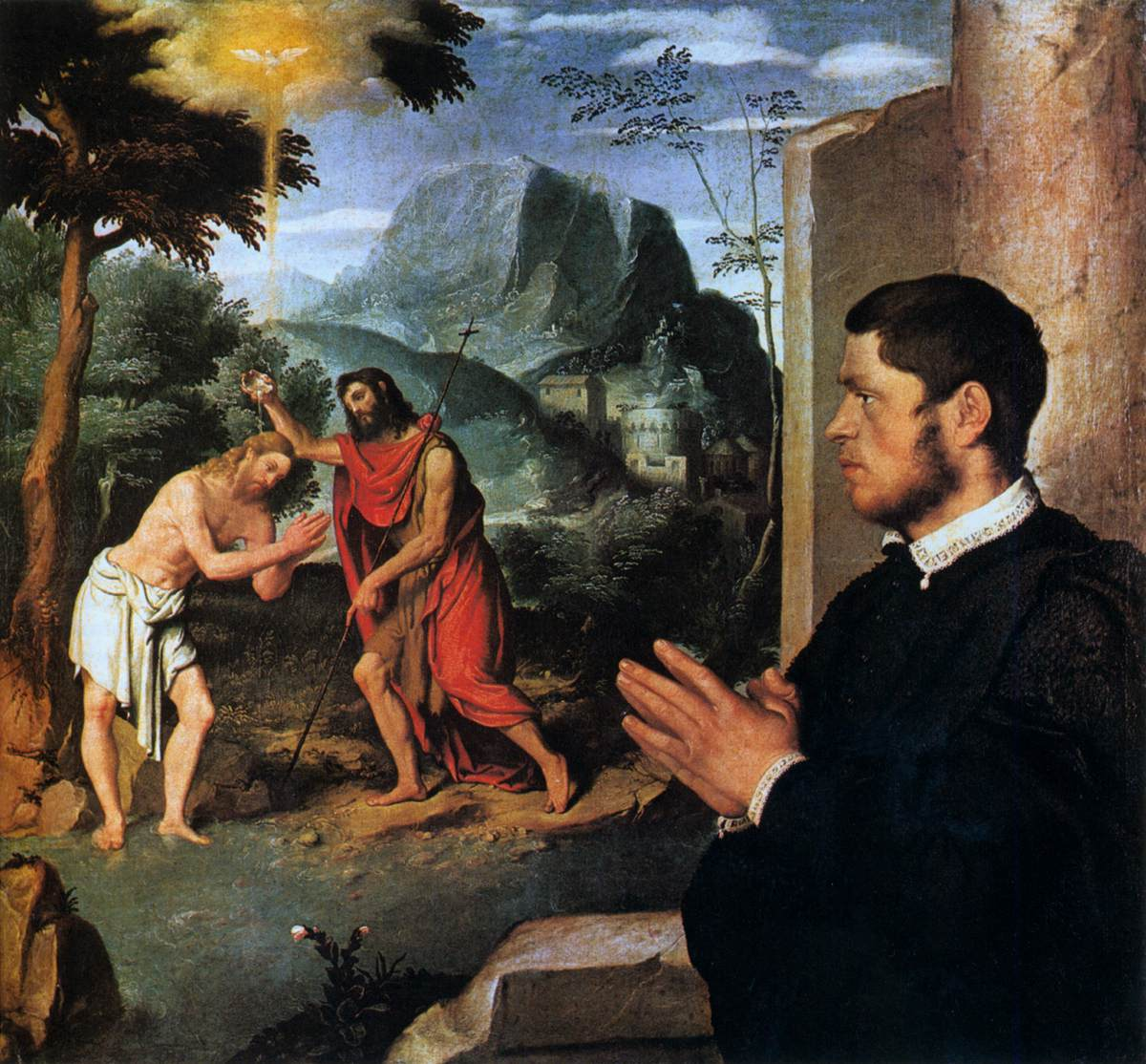
The Baptism of Christ with a Donor

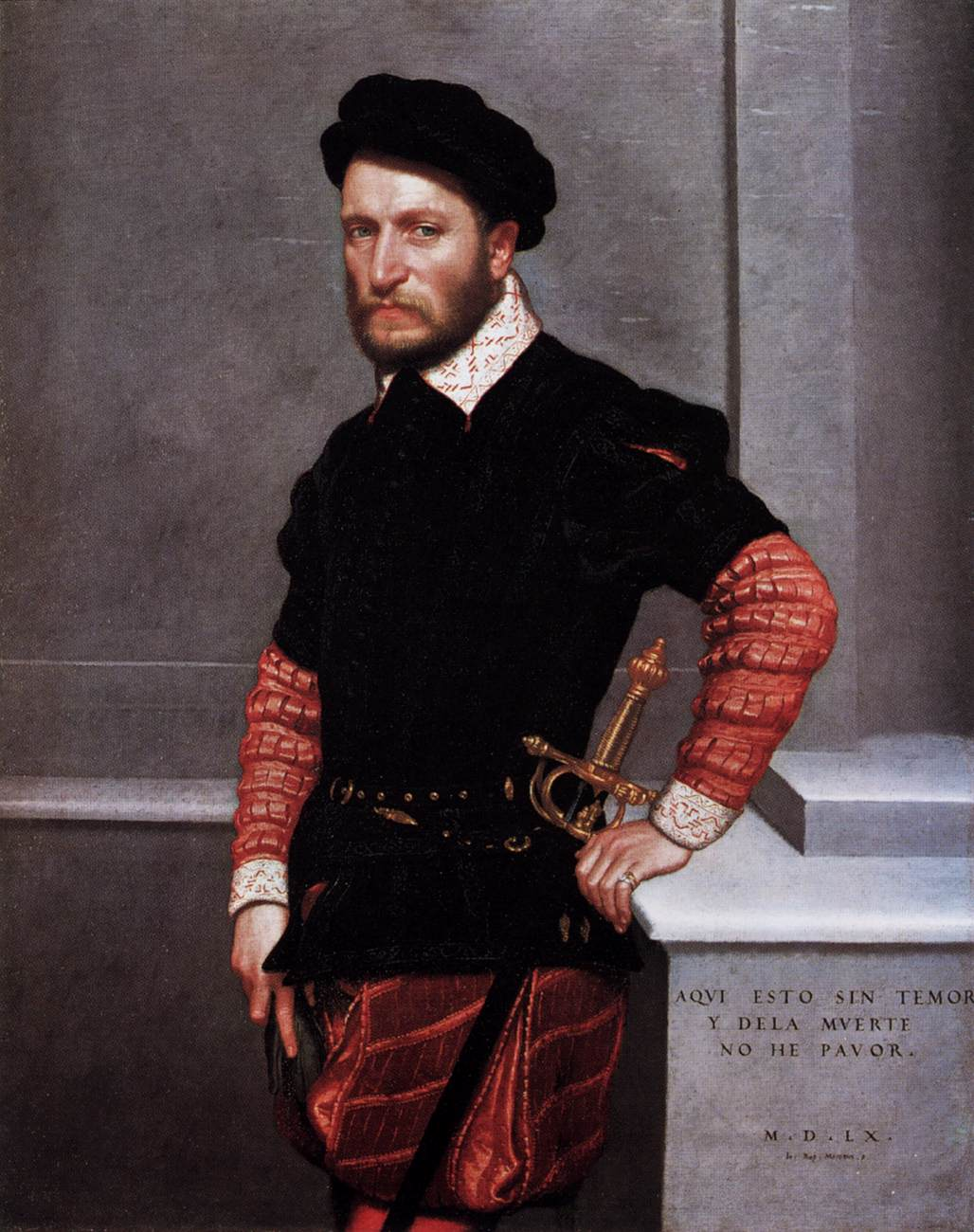
Portrait of Don Gabriel de la Cueva, 1560, Gemäldegalerie, Berlin

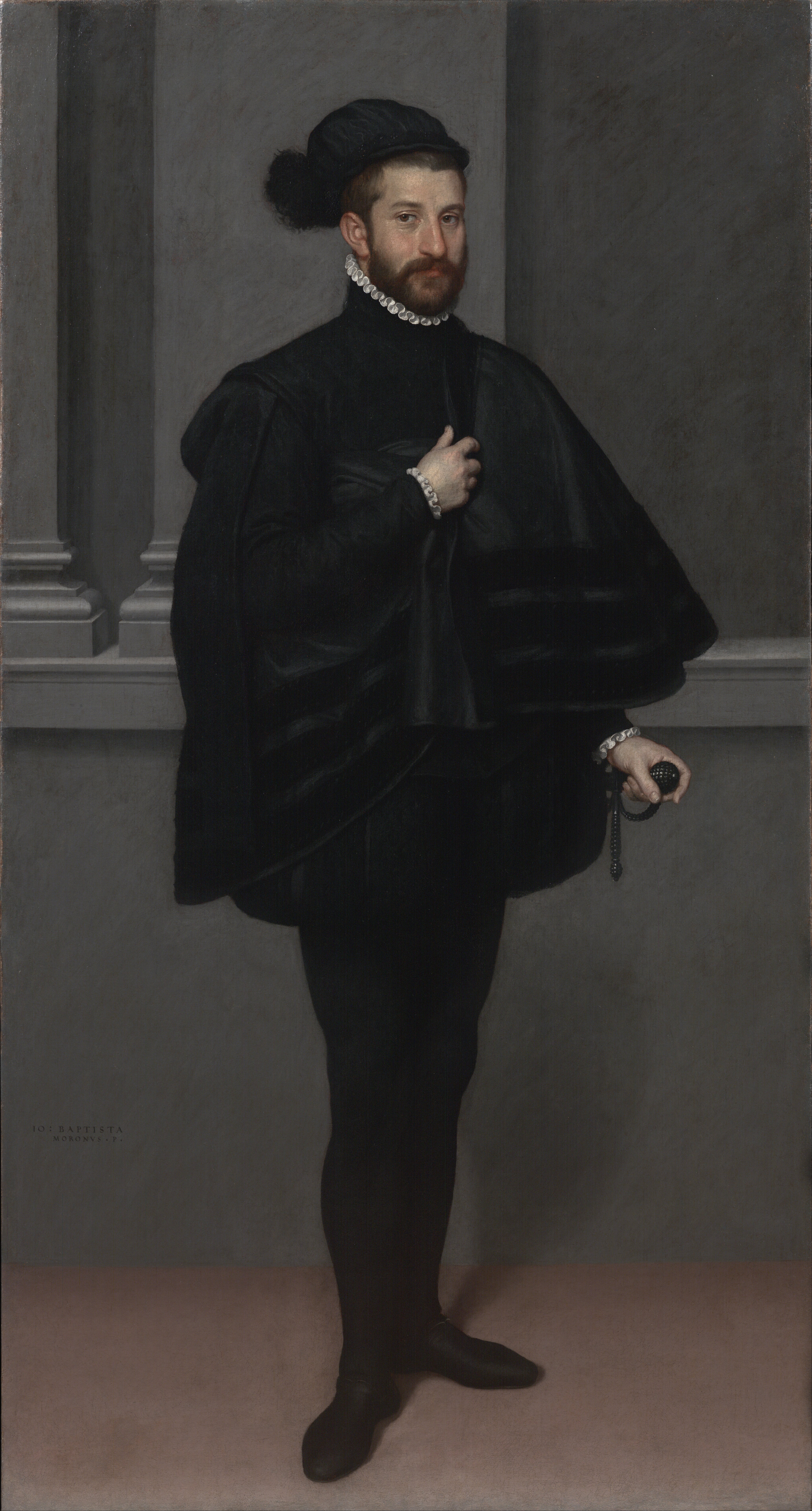
The Knight in Black, c. 1567, Museo Poldi Pezzoli, Milan

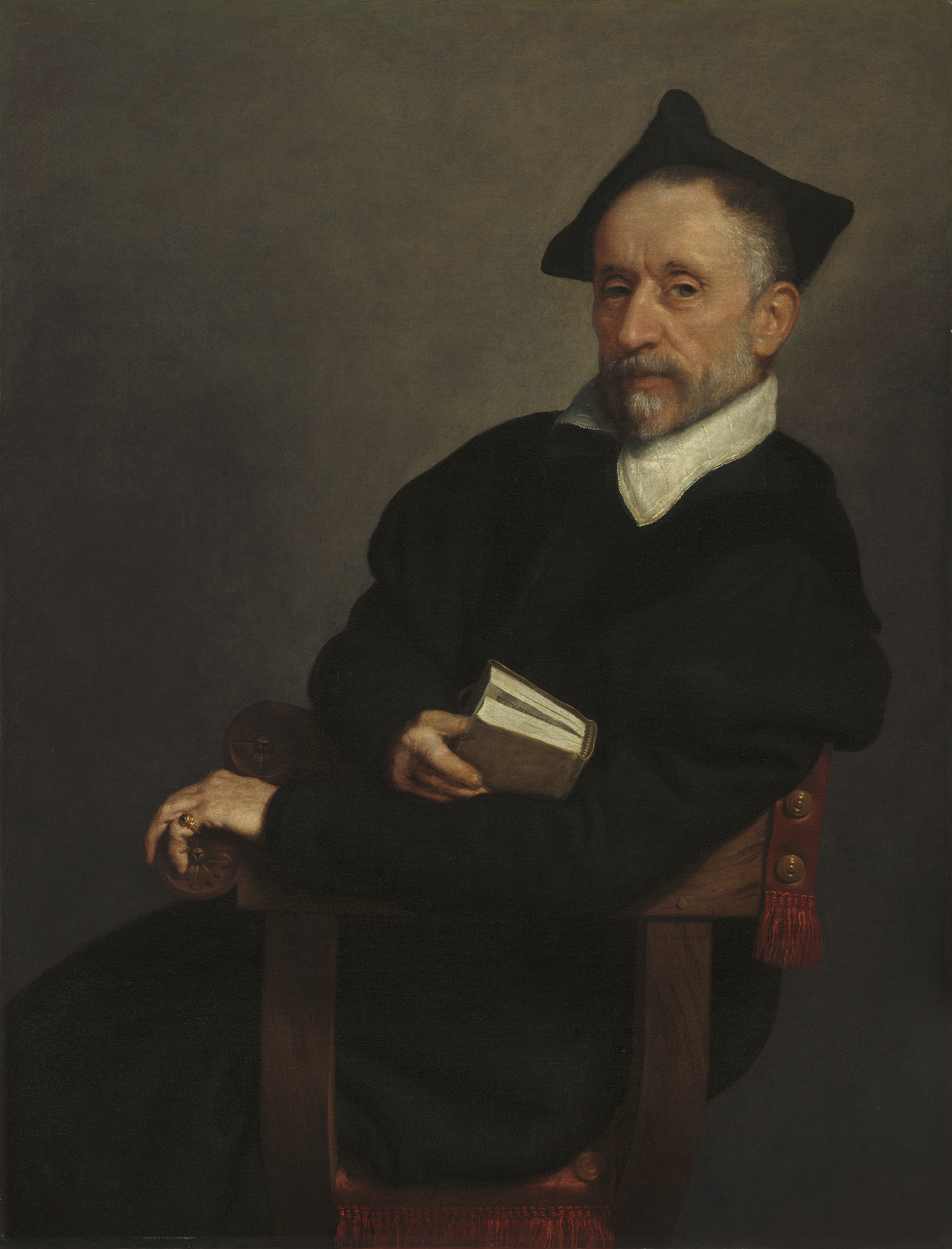
Titian's Schoolmaster, c. 1575, National Gallery of Art

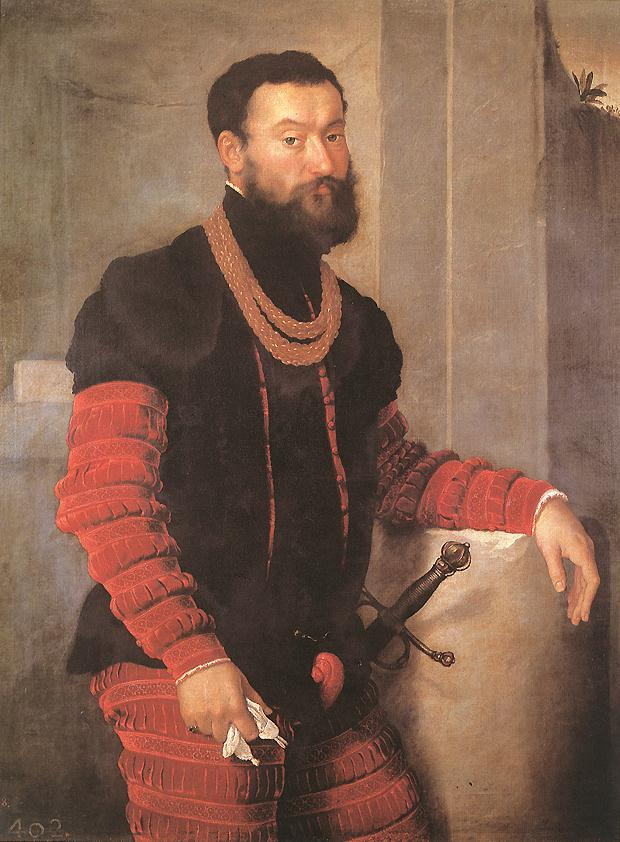
Portrait of a Soldier, c. 1560, Prado Museum, Madrid

== References and sources ==
=== Sources ===
- Freedberg, S.J. (1993). Painting in Italy 1500–1600. 3rd ed. 1993. Yale University Press. pp. 591–95.
- Gregori, Mina. Giovan Battista Moroni—tutte le opere. Bergamo: Poligrafiche Bolis, 1979.
- Ng, Aimee, Simone Facchinetti and Arturo Galansino. Moroni: The Riches of Renaissance Portraiture. Exh. cat. Feb. 29 – June 2, 2019. New York: The Frick Collection, 2019. (review with excerpts and images, Delancy Place, July 12, 2019)
- Rossetti, William Michael (1911). "Moroni, Giambattista" . In Chisholm, Hugh (ed.). Encyclopædia Britannica. Vol. 18 (11th ed.). Cambridge University Press. p. 861.
- Tiraboschi, Giampiero. Giovan Battista Moroni: l'uomo e l'artista. Bergamo: Tera mata, 2016.
- Wittkower, Rudolf (1993). "Art and Architecture Italy, 1600–1750". Pelican History of Art. 1980. London: Penguin Books. pp. 591–595.
