= The Tailor (Moroni) =

Painting by Giovanni Battista Moroni

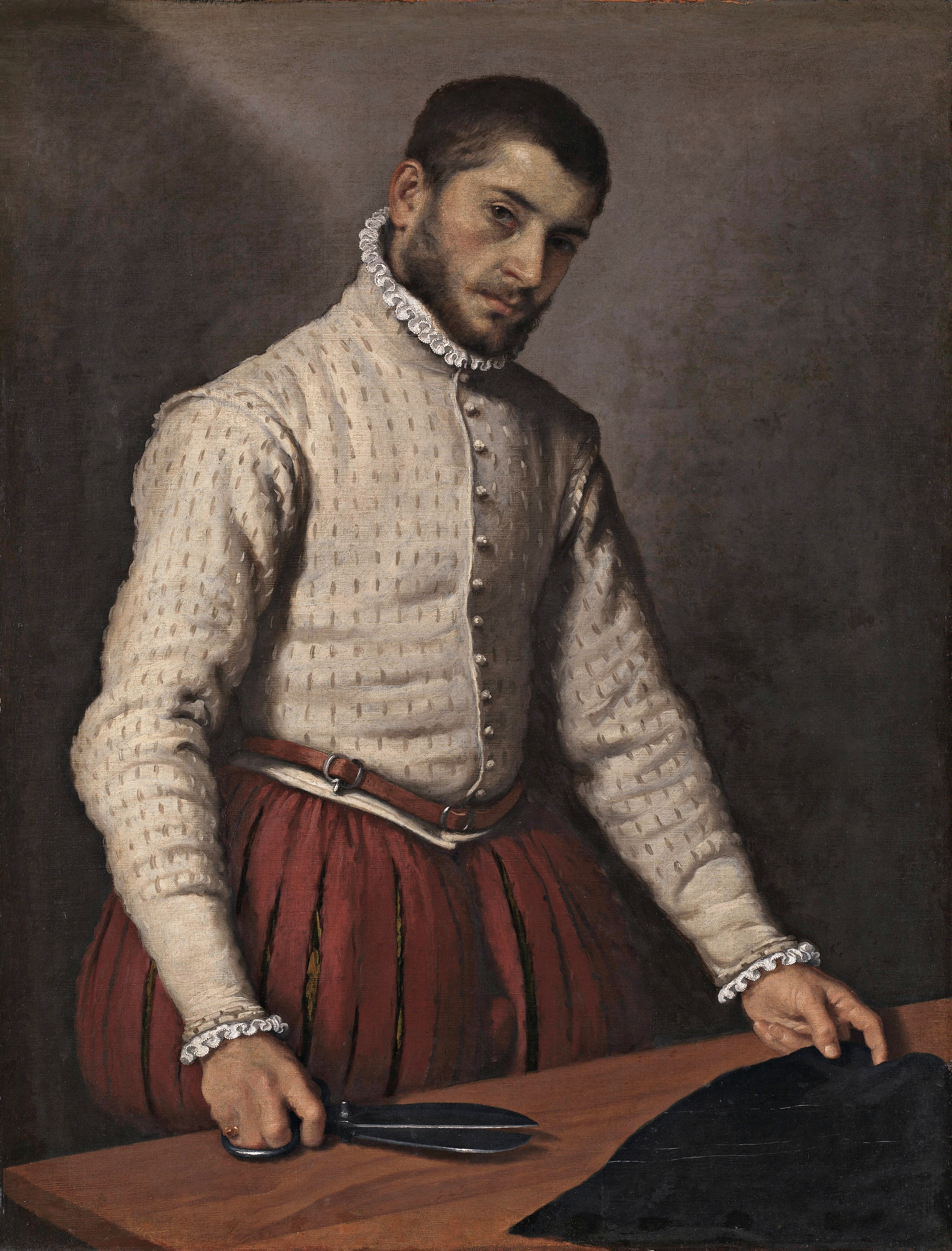
- Artist: Giovanni Battista Moroni
- Year: 1565-1570
- Medium: oil on canvas
- Dimensions: 99.5 cm × 77 cm (39.2 in × 30 in)
- Location: National Gallery, London

The Tailor (Italian: Il sarto) is an oil on canvas painting by Italian painter Giovanni Battista Moroni, from 1565-1570. It is a portrait of a member of the Marinoni family, who has been traditionally taken to be a tailor practising his art during the work day. The painting is held in the National Gallery, in London.

== History ==
Portraits of important persons and personages of Italy — merchants, aristocrats, and nobles — were the representational speciality of the artist Giovanni Battista Moroni, given that his influences included Tiziano and Lorenzo Lotto, and painterly tutelage under Moretto da Brescia.

It is not known who commissioned the painting. It is assumed that the subject is a member of the Marinoni family of Desenzano al Serio who, gave up their painter's workshop to move to Venice to take up the wool trade. The subject, here portrayed elegantly dressed for the occasion, was not a tailor but a seller of pennine (woollen cloth sold in pieces); the painting depicts the cutting of fabric, rather than the making of a garment. Fabric quality was very important in the Middle Ages and Renaissance. It was not possible for everyone to have clothes made of high-quality woollen cloth, so a pannine seller was a person who, although not noble, enjoyed a level of economic comfort. It was Marco Boschini in his literary work La carta del navegar pittoresco (1660) who identified the subject as a tailor.

== Description ==
Moroni worked on many paintings of religious nature, but became more famous for his portraits. The Tailor is one of the works that best represents his art. Moroni was among the first painters to depict important people of the wealthy bourgeoisie, contrary to the custom of his time, which exclusively portrayed the financial or ecclesiastical aristocracy.

The painting depicts a young character, with a well-groomed unkempt beard, placed against a brown background, and elegantly dressed. He wears wide puffed trousers in the fashion of his time, a jacket called a doublet from which emerges a white ruff (pleated collar) similar to the cuffs protruding from the sleeves.

The tailor is depicted standing, looking slightly to one side, with scissors in his hand, concentrated on his work which he seems to interrupt because he is disturbed, recalled by someone, perhaps precisely the painter who is portraying him. He turns his gaze, rests the scissors on the surface of his work and in that moment and movement, the artist immortalizes the scene almost photographically. In the dignity of the movement and in the truthfulness of the image, in knowing how to represent the seriousness of the gaze of someone who carries out a job that is civil but which it is placed at the same level of intensity of thought and concentration of a literary activity, he brought the painting his deserving fame.

== Provenance ==
The painting was originally owned by the Venetian Grimani family and passed from them to the Frizzonis in the 19th century, when it became part of the family's private collection in the Palazzo Frizzoni, now the town hall of Bergamo. It was bought in 1862 by Charles Lock Eastlake when he came to Italy to buy works of art for the National Gallery, in London, in the first years of its opening, where its still held.

In 2008, The Tailor was displayed in the Museo del Prado, Madrid, in an exposition of Renaissance-era portraits. It returned to Bergamo in 2015 - 2016 to be displayed in a temporary exhibition at the Accademia Carrara.

== Bibliography ==
- Olivar, M., Cien obras maestras de la pintura, Biblioteca Basica Salvat, 1971 (Spanish) ISBN 84-345-7215-X
