= Robert Moroney =

Australian cricketer

Personal information
- Born: 23 January 1885; Upper Sturt, South Australia
- Died: 4 August 1958 (aged 73); Adelaide, Australia
- Source: Cricinfo, 23 August 2020

Robert Moroney (23 January 1885 – 4 August 1958) was an Australian cricketer. He played in one first-class match for South Australia in 1920/21.

== See also ==
- List of South Australian representative cricketers
