= Moroni =

Moroni may refer to:

- Moroni (name)
- House of Moroni, an Italian noble family
- Moroni, Comoros
- Moroni, Utah
- Moroni (footballer) (born 1961), Brazilian footballer
- Mount Moroni

== Mormonism ==
- Moroni (prophet), a prophet in the Book of Mormon
- Angel Moroni, the angel that Joseph Smith claimed visited him
- Book of Moroni, a book of the Book of Mormon
- Captain Moroni, a figure in the Book of Mormon
- Moroni (city in the Book of Mormon)

== See also ==
- Maroni (disambiguation)
