= Moroni (footballer) =

Brazilian footballer

Personal information
- Full name: Paulo Ricardo Moroni
- Date of birth: 29 August 1961 (age 65)
- Place of birth: Santa Rosa, Brazil
- Height: 1.79 m (5 ft 10 in)
- Position: Defender

Youth career
- 1981: Inter-SM

Senior career*
Years	Team	Apps	(Gls)
1982–1985	Inter-SM		
1985	Guarani		
1986–1987	Vasco da Gama		
1987–1992	Braga	116	(8)
1992–1994	Ovarense	52	(8)
1995	Mogi Mirim		
1996	Santa Cruz-RS		
- * Club domestic league appearances and goals

Paulo Ricardo Moroni (born 29 August 1961), known as Moroni, is a Brazilian former professional footballer who played as a defender. He played five seasons and 116 games in the Primeira Liga for Braga.

== Career ==
Moroni made his Primeira Liga debut for Braga on 13 December 1987 as a starter in a 1–1 draw against Marítimo.
