= Palais du Pharo =

Palace in Marseille, France

Coordinates: 43.2942°N 5.3581°E

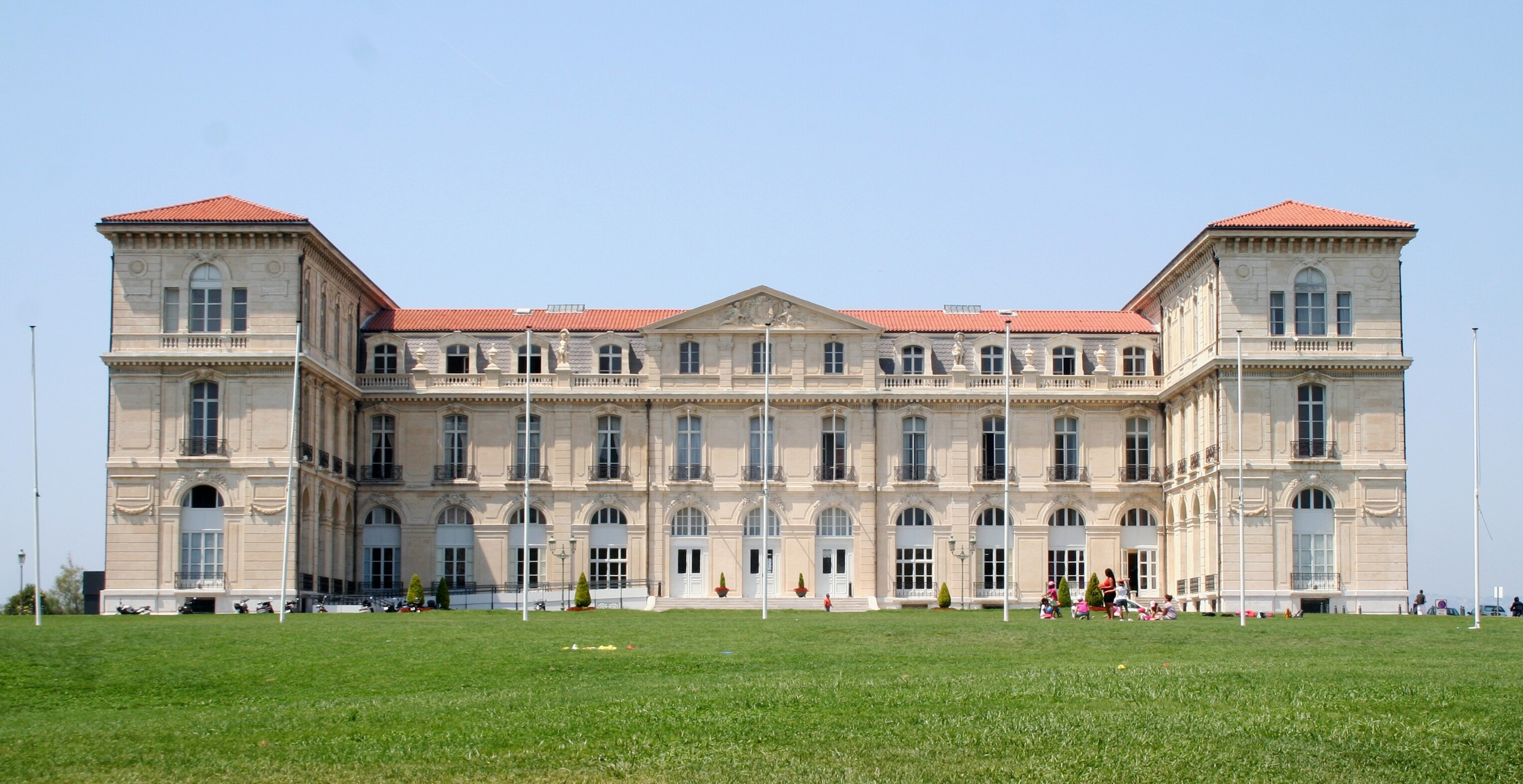
Palace main façade

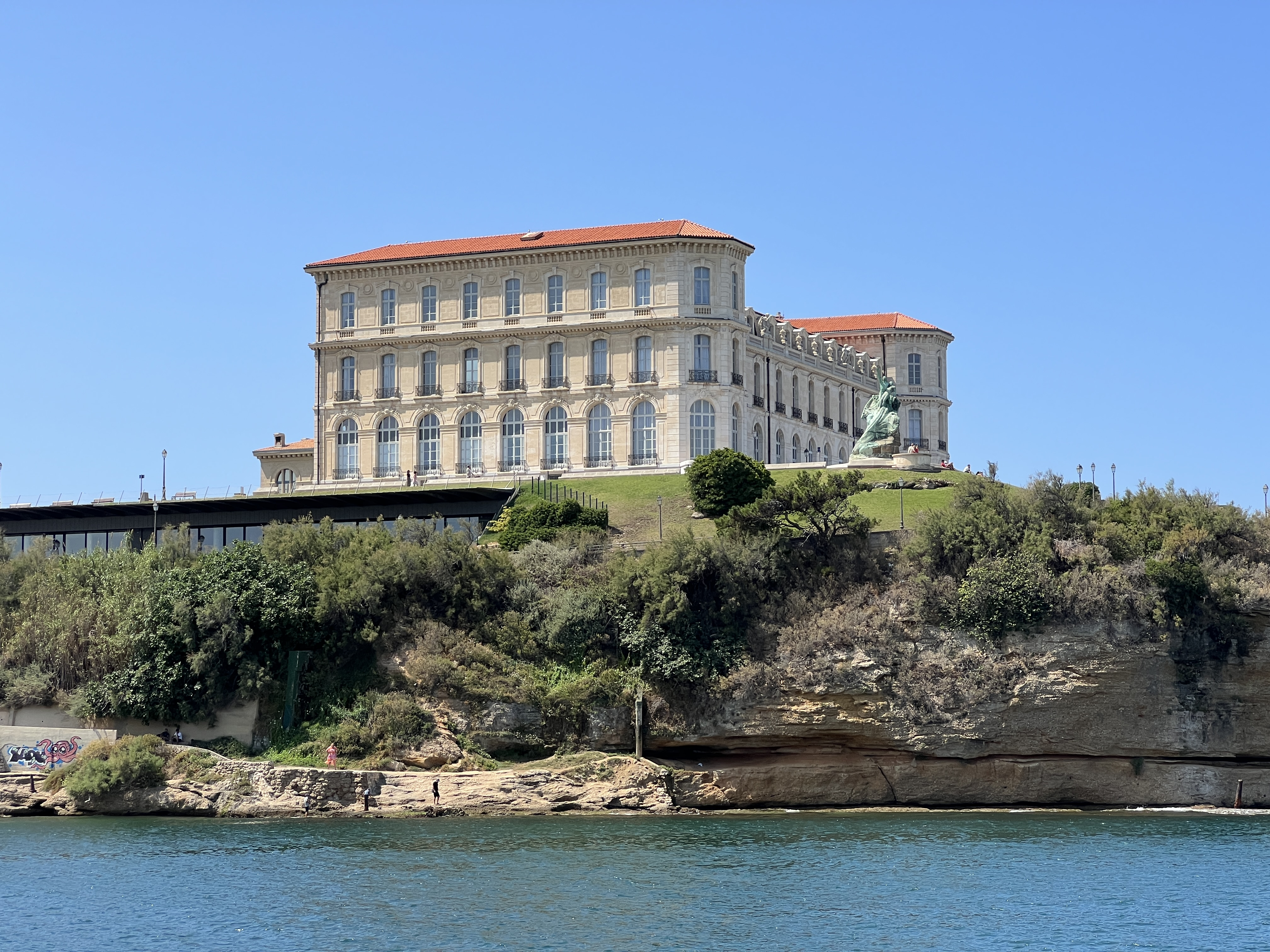
As seen from the northeast

The Palais du Pharo (French pronunciation: [palɛ dy faʁo] Occitan: Palais del Pharo) is a palace in Marseille, southern France, overlooking the Mediterranean Sea, west of the Old Port (Vieux-Port). It was built in Second Empire style by Emperor Napoleon III for Empress Eugénie, starting in 1858. However, at the fall of the Second Empire in 1870, the building had just been finished. Nowadays, the palace and its gardens are used for events, with the park open to the public. In 2025 it became a monument historique, celebrating its significance in local heritage.

== History ==
In 1884, amid a cholera epidemic, the palace was transformed into a hospital. For the rest of the century, under the Third Republic, it was used for the treatment of cholera and tuberculosis victims. From 1905 to 2013, an institute for the study of tropical medicines, the École du Pharo, operated in a building in the palace park, part of the French Armed Forces Health Service. Since 2015, Aix-Marseille University has its headquarters in the building.

== See also ==
- École du Pharo
