= École du service de santé des armées =

The École du service de santé des armées (ESSA) is the main medical school organisation for the French Armed Forces (Forces armées françaises), although mainly administered by the French Army (Armée de terre).

== Structure ==
The École du personnel paramédical des armées trains paramedics, and was formed in 1990.

The head of the SSA is Lt-Gen Maryline Gygax Généro, the Surgeon General (Médecin général des Armées or MGA) of the French Army since 2017 (Directrice centrale), and the first female to hold the post, when she replaced Jean-Marc Debonne.

== Training ==
Military medical training in France is the responsibility of the French Defence Health Service (Service de Santé des Armées or SSA).

== See also ==
- Emergency medical services in France
- Medical education in France
- École du Pharo
