= Henri Laborit =

French surgeon, neurobiologist, writer and philosopher (1914-95)

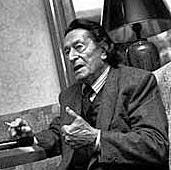
- Laborit in 1991
- Born: 21 November 1914; Hanoi, Tonkin Protectorate, French Indochina
- Died: 18 May 1995 (aged 80); Paris, France
- Known for: Discovery of the effects of chlorpromazine, GHB, gamma-OH, clomethiazole, minaprine
- Awards: Chevalier of the Legion of Honor, Lasker-DeBakey Clinical Medical Research Award, Nobel Peace Prize 1985 (as part of the Honour's Committee for the IPPNW)
- Scientific career
- Fields: neurophysiology, pharmacology, psychiatry, psychosomatics
- Institutions: Val-de-Grâce, Boucicault Hospital

Henri Laborit (21 November 1914 – 18 May 1995) was a French surgeon, neurobiologist, writer and philosopher. In 1952, Laborit was instrumental in the development of the drug chlorpromazine, published his findings, and convinced three psychiatrists to test it on a patient, resulting in great success. Laborit was recognized for his work, but as a surgeon searching for an anesthetic, he came to be at odds with psychiatrists who made their own discoveries and competing claims.

Laborit wrote several books where he popularizes his ethological laboratory research and marries it, through systems thinking, with knowledge from several other disciplines, being a strong advocate of interdisciplinarity and transdisciplinarity. His writings can also be found to have deep roots in anarchist thought. He was personally untroubled by the requirements of science and the constraints of university life. He maintained an independence from academia and never sought to produce the orderly results that science requires of its adherents.

== Family and early years ==
Henri Laborit was born in Hanoi, French Indochina, in 1914. His father was a physician and colonial officer who died in 1920 from tetanus. Laborit contracted tuberculosis at age 12. In Paris, he earned a baccalaureate. He spent two years in Indochina on a hospital ship. He passed the examinations at the Naval Health Service in Bordeaux, and became a navy physician. He was sent to Sidi Abdallah, Bizerte. Feeling that his options for recognition would be better, he switched to become a surgeon. During World War II he was stationed on the torpedo boat Sirocco, where he witnessed the evacuation of the Dunkerque, and then was sunk by the Germans. He was saved by an English sloop that picked him up. He received the French Military Cross with distinction. He was later stationed in Dakar. By about 1949 he was appointed to Val-de-Grâce hospital in Paris.

== Chlorpromazine ==
Laborit was the first to recognize the potential psychiatric uses of chlorpromazine. The science of anesthesiology was new since the 1930s. Surgeons were sometimes responsible for anesthetics and as a French navy surgeon, Laborit had seen patients die as a result of or after their operations. He became a researcher in anesthesiology. Laborit's ideas on anesthesia included potentiated anaesthesia, lowering basal metabolism and lowering body temperature (so-called artificial hibernation). He advocated the use of procaine, synthetic antihistamines, Diparcol (diethazine), tetraethylammonium bromide and vitamin B1. He did not like to use morphine. In his years in Bizerte he became interested in the use of the antihistamine promethazine to make patients more relaxed before surgery and in contributing to anesthesia, observations that were the forerunner of his later interest in chlorpromazine.

With Pierre Huguenard, Laborit invented the lytic cocktail, a combination of drugs that could be given to patients to reduce the shock and stress they experienced during and after surgery. Huguenard had success with a combination of promethazine and pethidine, at the time under the trade names Diparcol and Dolossal, and told Laborit of his finding. Laborit thought that putting patients into a state of artificial hibernation would prevent some aspects of stress reactions. These drugs made bodies stop their reactions to cooling.

Laborit suggested to Rhône-Poulenc (a pharmaceutical company that became Sanofi) that they create antihistamines that optimized stabilization of the central nervous system. There, chemist Paul Charpentier headed a group trying to improve on the existing drug diphenhydramine (Benadryl, Dramamine, U.S. Sominex). So Charpentier created a new series of phenothiazines, one of them by adding a chlorine atom. Simone Courvoisier tested the series on laboratory rats and discovered that RP 4560 (chlorinated promazine, later known as chlorpromazine) could reverse the effects of epinephrine and could induce a state of apathy or indifference. Rhône-Poulenc marketed the drug in Europe for vomiting, pain, nausea, and convulsions as Largactil in 1952. (Note: The U.S. FDA approved the use of chlorpromazine for psychiatry and Smith, Kline and French (now GlaxoSmithKline) released the drug as Thorazine in 1954.) Laborit is said to have named the drug, a blended word for "large activity".

He, Huguenard and an associate named R. Alluaume published "A new vegetative stabilizer: 4560 RP." in La Presse Médicale in February 1952. According to Max Bennett, "the effect of the drug to produce 'disinterest' is mentioned together with the possibility that this property might make it of psychiatric use."

Immediately following its synthesis at Rhône-Poulenc in December 1951, Laborit requested a sample of 4560 RP to test for the purpose of reducing shock in injured soldiers. His observation that people treated with this drug showed reduced interest in their surroundings led him to suggest the first test of antipsychotics by Hamon, Paraire and Velluz. A 24-year-old patient with mania was released from Val-de-Grâce and ready "to resume a normal life" after 20 days treatment with chlorpromazine and barbiturates.

Although it had severe side effects, chlorpromazine "helped change the face of serious mental illness" and allowed many patients to live outside mental asylums; in the United States, the inpatient population of mental institutions dropped from 559,000 in 1955 to 452,000 ten years later." (Note: Frontline, citing E. Fuller Torrey, says from 1955 to 1994 the number of seriously ill mental patients in U.S. public psychiatric hospitals went down from 558,239 to 71,619 as a result of the introduction of chlorpromazine.)

== Lasker award ==
Laborit shared the prestigious Lasker-DeBakey Clinical Medical Research Award in 1957 with Pierre Deniker and Heinz Lehmann for contributions towards the general use of chlorpromazine. No one won a Nobel Prize for the discovery, and Jean Delay of the Sainte-Anne Hospital Center, who wanted to win himself, sat on the Nobel committee but was opposed to giving it to Laborit. Laborit found himself at odds with Sainte-Anne hospital's staff for the rest of his life.

In 1957, the Lasker Foundation also recognized Nathan S. Kline and Robert H. Noce, both of whom advanced reserpine as a treatment for mental illness, as well as Rustom Jal Vakil for treating hypertension with reserpine, and, unrelated, Richard E. Shope for pioneering our understanding of viruses.

== Career ==
Laborit became director of the Laboratoire d'Eutonologie at Boucicault Hospital in Paris. His interests included psychotropic drugs and memory.

Alexander Zaytsev synthesized GHB in 1874, and Laborit synthesized the drug in 1960. He was researching GHB as a precursor to the neurotransmitter GABA. Laborit published "Sodium 4-hydroxybutyrate" in the International Journal of Neuropharmacology in September 1964.

== Awards and cultural references ==
Laborit received the Croix de Guerre with distinction. He was elected a Chevalier of the Legion of Honor in 1953. He received the Lasker-DeBakey Clinical Medical Research Award which he shared in 1957, after traveling to the United States on behalf of Rhône-Poulenc.

Laborit's ideas are the substance of the Alain Resnais 1980 film Mon oncle d'Amérique in which he plays himself.

Laborit interviewed Salvador Dalí about one of his books which Dalí had read but did not understand.

== Death and legacy ==
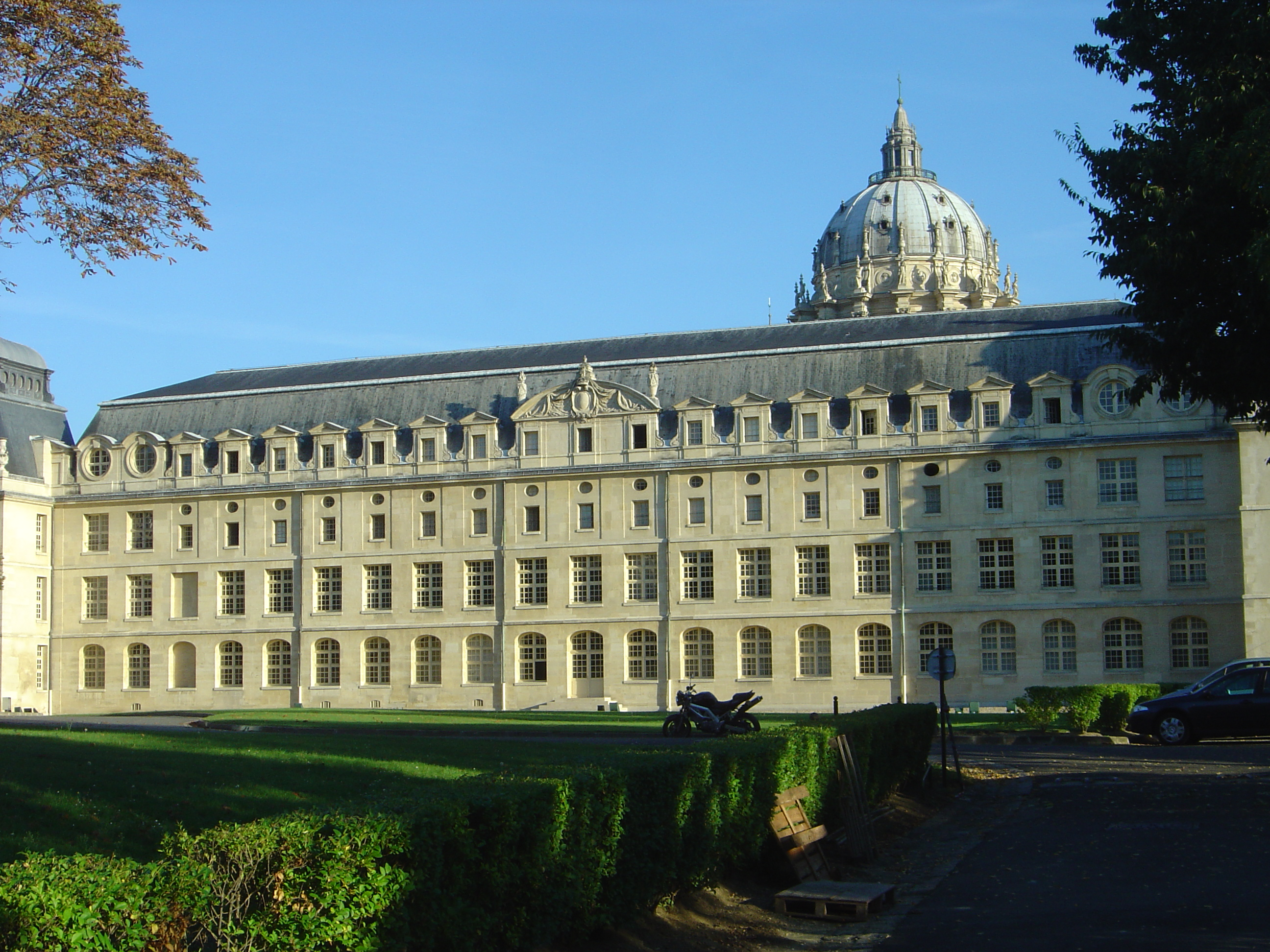
Val-de-Grâce where Laborit worked and three psychiatrists tested chlorpromazine in 1952

Healy wrote that Laborit felt cheated of his recognition and that he died a bitter man. Healy noted a few attempts to set the record straight: a 1980 book by Jean Thuillier that credits Delay and Deniker and Laborit, a 1960s book by Ann Caldwell that sided with Laborit, and a 1974 book by Judith Swazey, Chlorpromazine in Psychiatry, which gave credit to both sides. A 1992 commemoration by Rhône-Poulenc gave Laborit credit for anesthesia but gave Deniker and Delay credit for application of chlorpromazine to psychiatry. In 1994, on the 200th anniversary of the founding of Val-de-Grâce, a plaque was placed there commemorating the discovery of chlorpromazine by Laborit, Harmon, Paraire, and Velluz in 1952.

Laborit was one of the pioneers of complexity theory and self-organization in France and the initiator of "complex thought" in his meetings with the "Groupe des Dix". "Complex thought" was later popularized by Edgar Morin.

== Publications ==
- Physiologie et biologie du système nerveux végétatif au service de la chirurgie (1950)
- L'anesthésie facilitée par les synergies médicamenteuses (1951)
- Réaction organique à l'agression et choc (1952)
- Pratique de l'hibernothérapie en chirurgie et en médecine (1954)
- Résistance et soumission en physio-biologie : l'hibernation artificielle (1954)
- Excitabilité neuro-musculaire et équilibre ionique. Intérêt pratique en chirurgie et hibernothérapie (1955)
- Le delirium tremens (1956)
- Bases physio-biologiques et principes généraux de réanimation (1958)
- Les destins de la vie et de l'homme. Controverses par lettres sur des thèmes biologiques (1959)
- Physiologie humaine (cellulaire et organique) (1961)
- Du soleil à l'homme (1963)
- Les régulations métaboliques (1965)
- Biologie et structure (1968)
- Neurophysiologie. Aspects métaboliques et pharmacologiques (1969)
- L'Homme imaginant : Essai de biologie politique (1970)
- L'homme et la ville (1971)
- L'agressivité détournée : Introduction à une biologie du comportement social (1970)
- La Société informationnelle : Idées pour l'autogestion (1973)
- Les Comportements : Biologie, physiologie, pharmacologie (1973)
- La Nouvelle grille (1974)
- Éloge de la fuite (1976)
- Discours sans méthode (1978)
- L'Inhibition de l'action (1979)
- La Colombe assassinée (1983)
- Dieu ne joue pas aux dés (1987)
- La vie antérieure (1987)
- Les récepteurs centraux et la transduction de signaux (1990)
- L'esprit dans le grenier (1992)
- Étoiles et molécules (1992)
- La légende des comportements (1994)
- Une Vie - Derniers entretiens (1996)

== Bibliography ==
- Healy, David (2002). The Creation of Psychopharmacology. Harvard University Press. ISBN 0-674-00619-4.
