= René Passet =

French economist (1926–2025)

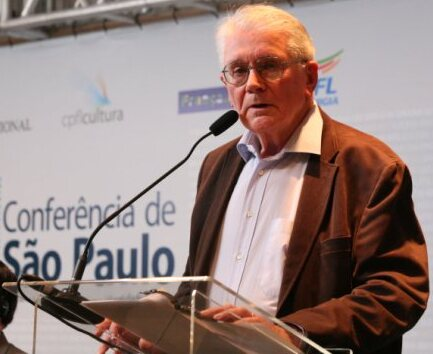
- Passet in 2009
- Born: 28 September 1926; Bègles, France
- Died: 23 November 2025 (aged 99); Chatou, France
- Occupation: Economist

René Passet (28 September 1926 – 23 November 2025) was a French economist. A member of the Groupe des Dix, he served as president of the Scientific Council of the Association for the Taxation of Financial Transactions and for Citizens' Action from 1998 to 1999.

Passet died at his home in Chatou, on 23 November 2025, at the age of 99.
