= Groupe des Dix =

French think tank

The Groupe des Dix (the Group of Ten) was the name given to a group of notable French personalities (mostly philosophers and scientists) who would regularly meet up between 1969 and 1976.

== History ==
The Groupe des Dix was formed in 1969. The atmosphere was one of openness and conviviality: the meetings were not recorded and the participants felt that they had a maximum amount of freedom to be themselves and discuss their ideas. The group formed with the purpose of better informing political action in the light of recent scientific discoveries. The group explored many topics and occasionally invited high status speakers to speak about their work. The group had a transdisciplinary vision. Discussions were diverse and occurred largely on a background in cybernetics, systems theory, neurobiology and information theory. Some of the disciplines regularly discussed were: anthropology, ecology, evolutionary psychology, economics and media studies. Many members influenced each other's future works.

Some of the members of the group were: Henri Atlan, Jacques Attali, Jean-François Boissel, Robert Buron, Joël de Rosnay, Henri Laborit, André Leroi-Gourhan, Edgar Morin, René Passet, Michel Rocard, Jacques Robin, Jacques Sauvan, Jack Baillet, Alain Laurent and Michel Serres.

== Sources ==
- Le Groupe Des Dix, ou les avatars des rapports entre science et politique, by Brigitte Chamak, 1997 ISBN 9782268024813
