= École du Pharo =

French military school of Marseille

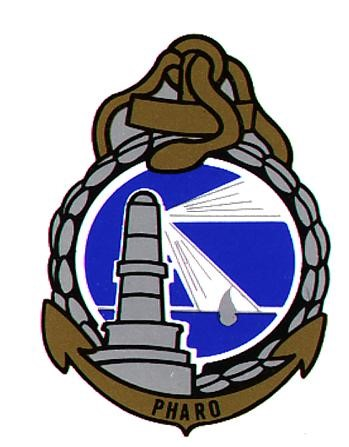
- Active: April 12th, 1905–June 30, 2013
- Founders: Albert Clarac Ministry of War, first director
- Director: Marc Morillon, last director
- Students: Over 9,000 in 108 years
- Location: Marseille, France; 43°17′39.12″N 5°21′29.16″E
- Language: French
- Website: http://www.ceuxdupharo.fr/
- Location within Provence-Alpes-Côte d'Azur

The École du Pharo was a French military school, specialized in teaching and researching tropical medicine, based in Marseille on the grounds of the Palais du Pharo.

== History ==
It operated from 1905 to 2013, initially training mainly French doctors and pharmacists, both regular and contracted military personnel; then doctors called up for national service, foreign military doctors, and French and non-French civilian health professionals.

Almost all the doctors who worked in the French colonial empire passed through the École du Pharo, which played a key role in health policy in colonized territories. In 1936, its educational role was complemented by creating research laboratories dedicated to tropical diseases and nutrition.

After 1960, it continued to provide training for all doctors and pharmacists serving under the French Ministry of Health Cooperation. In 1981 an epidemiology and public health department dedicated to community health was created.

In 2008, the French government decided to close the school. The activities were then redistributed, with the research activities of the entire French Armed Forces Medical Corps (SSA) grouped within a new, single military biomedical research institute and the public health activities of the whole SSA grouped within the Armed Forces Epidemiology and Public Health Center created for this purpose, and responsibility for training activities transferred to the École du Val de Grâce (Paris). The establishment closed its doors for good on June 30, 2013.

Over the course of more than a century of existence, the École du Pharo was officially and consecutively known as:

- École d'application du service de santé des troupes coloniales (1905);
- École d'application et center d'instruction et de recherche du service de santé des troupes coloniales (1954);
- École d'application et center d'instruction et de recherche du service de santé des troupes d'outre-mer (1958);
- École d'application et center d'instruction et de recherche du service de santé des troupes de marine (1961);
- École de spécialisation du service de santé pour l'armée de terre et institut de pathologie exotique (1970);
- Institut de médecine tropicale du service de santé des armées (1975).

== Background and origins ==
=== Colonial conquest ===
The formation of the French colonial empire posed the problem of its sanitary management by health professionals. Their ancestors could be the physicians, surgeons, and apothecaries of the Royal Navy, who worked in the colonies during the Ancien Régime. The Consulate organized a "Colonial Health Service" for the Navy, but this often duplicated the military health of the land troops involved in the conquests.

At the end of the nineteenth century, the French Third Republic expanded its colonial empire through a policy of territorial expansion. The navy transported the troops needed for the conquests and later for the maintenance of order, and its doctors and nurses provided medical care for all these personnel, both on board and ashore.

These doctors were confronted on land with appalling epidemics among soldiers (yellow fever in Gorée in 1878, dysentery in the Far East between 1859 and 1861, cholera in Tonkin between 1884 and 1887, malaria during the Madagascar campaign in 1895, etc.) and with endemic diseases unknown among the indigenous populations. In addition, the administrative authorities wanted to improve the health of civilian populations as part of their "civilizing mission" to develop the colonies.

=== Colonial healthcare ===
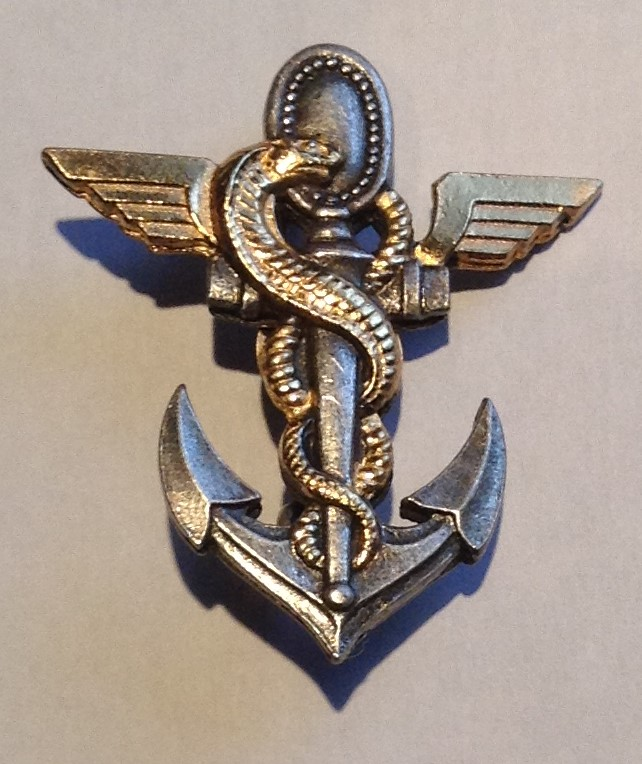
Colonial Army Medical Corps badge.

As the Navy was unable to supply the ever-increasing demand for medical personnel, reform was needed. In 1890, a simple decree created the Colonial and Protectorate Medical Corps, detached from the Navy and placed under the authority of the Minister for the Colonies, responsible for running the hospitals in the colonies as well as supporting the military forces deployed in the colonies. The corps was therefore open to both civilians and military personnel.

This initial policy failed to solve recruitment problems. The career of a colonial physician was not very advantageous, dangerous, or rewarding. Very few civilians signed up, with the notable exception of Alexandre Yersin. In terms of honors, precedence, and advancement, colonials were at a disadvantage, and the staffing crisis worsened. In practice, recruitment remained almost exclusively military. What's more, ambiguities in the statutes made it difficult to manage careers and discipline, and consequently to keep the service running smoothly.

To resolve these difficulties, the law of July 7, 1900, granted autonomy to the Troupes Coloniales (the new name for the Troupes de Marine). On November 4, 1903, a decree created the Colonial Troops Health Service (SSTC) to replace the Colonial and Protectorate Health Service.

This "decree of understanding" divided the roles of the Ministry of War and the Ministry of the Colonies: the Ministry of War was responsible for the general discipline of colonial physicians (in metropolitan France and overseas). They are placed outside the framework of their profession when they are placed at the disposal of the Minister of the Colonies for overseas civilian missions (sanitary police, epidemic control, etc.). In this way, the SSTC was officially entrusted with missions for the benefit of civilian populations, confirming the duality of its mission.

Given the reluctance of civilian doctors to be civil servants in difficult conditions, health care in the French tropical colonies has always been a matter for military doctors.

== Creation of the school ==
The reforms did not solve the recruitment problem, which was added, with the explosion in knowledge (microbiology, parasitology...), a training problem. Following the example of Albert Calmette as early as 1890, many colonial physicians asked to improve their skills at the Pasteur Institute, where a training course for colonial troop physicians was regularly opened from 1903. But the scale of the practical problems encountered made it clear that a special school was needed for Colonial Troop Health Service officers.

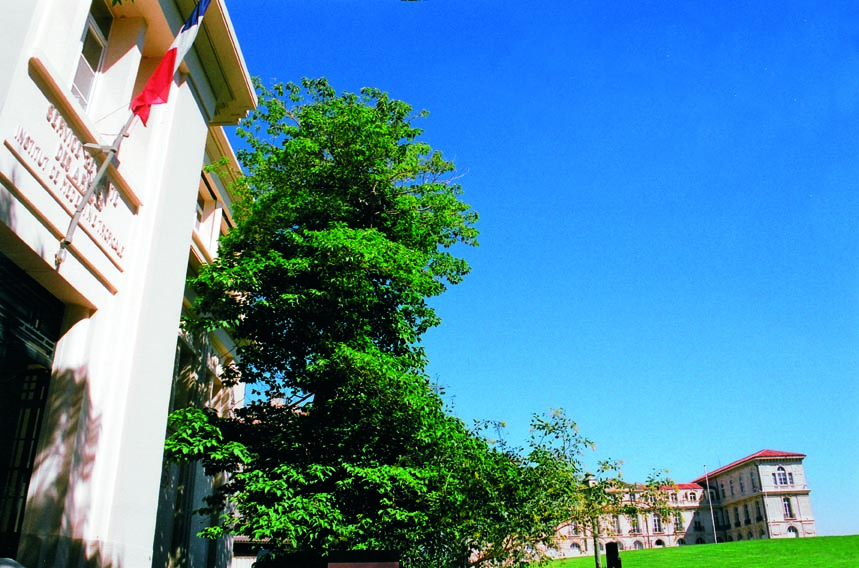
The Palais du Pharo seen from the École in the foreground.

The project for a specific school was conceived in 1900. The Ministry of War, responsible for colonial troops, proposed the creation of a practical school of tropical medicine. The location of this school was hotly contested, as at the time every town in France was seeking the honor of hosting a garrison or military institution.

As early as August 1900, Marseille applied for the project. As a reminder, in December 1883, Marseille had already applied to host a military medical school and had set aside a budget for this purpose, but the planned school was eventually set up in Lyon. The economic consequences of the Prado arena disaster on the one hand, and the cholera epidemics of 1884 and 1885 in the city on the other, were not unrelated to Lyon's choice of location.

=== Choosing Marseille ===
The city of Marseille therefore decided to host the new establishment as close as possible to its medical school, which since 1893 has been housed in the enlarged and upgraded former imperial palace: the Palais du Pharo, partly used as a temporary hospital under the name "Hôpital du Pharo" since the cholera epidemic of 1884.

Since 1875 The city of Marseille had only had a full-fledged school of medicine and pharmacy, and for decades had been seeking to turn it into a faculty of medicine and pharmacy (the only faculty authorized to award doctorates), hoped that this co-location would advance its academic cause.

In 1902, the Director of the Colonial Health Service submitted a project for the creation of the school, in which he developed the necessary criteria for its establishment. Among other things, he emphasized the possibility of teaching tropical pathology in a hospital on site, which led him to conclude that "these elements can only be found in a seaside town" and to suggest Marseille, where colonial teaching at the medical school, a Colonial Institute and a Colonial Museum already existed.

At first, the city proposed allocating a wing of the Palais du Pharo to the school, but finally, at its meeting on November 25, 1904, the City Council decided to set up the Colonial Health School in a purpose-built building in the Parc du Pharo, next to the Anatomy Institute. On April 12, 1905, an agreement was signed between the Mayor of Marseille, Amable Chanot, and the Minister of War, concerning the installation and organization in Marseille of the Colonial Army Medical School.

The Marseille City Council was delighted, and the mayor drew a positive conclusion from the event: "I don't think I'm going too far in expressing my conviction that the establishment of the Colonial Health School in Marseilles will enable us to finally obtain from the government the transformation of our fully-fledged medical and pharmacy school into a faculty". In fact, this transformation would not take place until 25 years later.

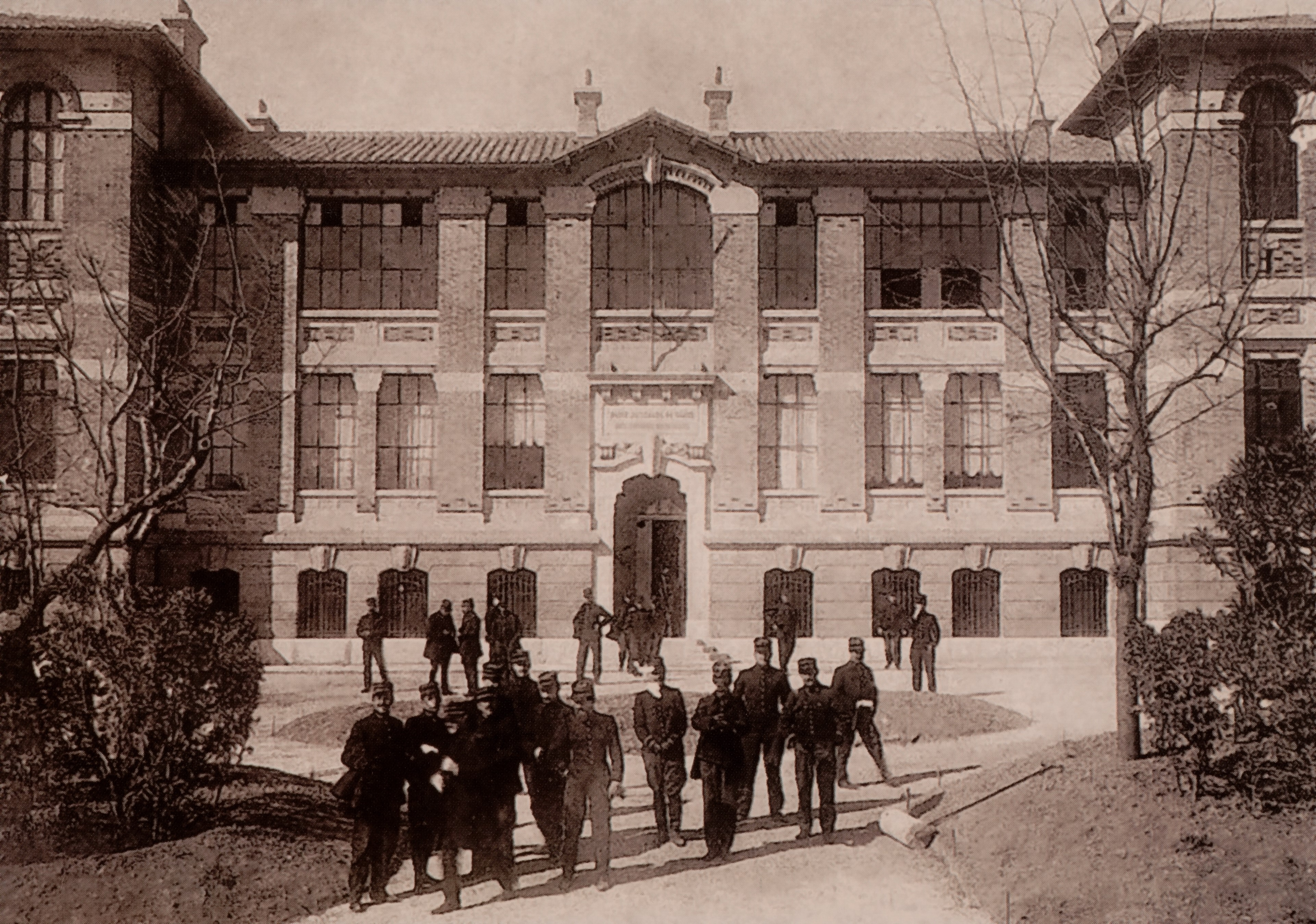

=== Installation ===
On October 3, 1905, the decree creating the École d'application du service de santé des troupes coloniales, at Marseille. was issued. Work began in 1906, under the supervision of the city's chief architect, Léonce-Aloïs Muller. On July 3, 1906, Albert Clarac, senior medical officer first class, (Note: Rank corresponding to colonel in the general military hierarchy.) was appointed director of the school, while Paul-Louis Simond, senior medical officer second class, (Note: Rank corresponding to lieutenant-colonel in the general military hierarchy.) was appointed deputy director, in charge of teaching bacteriology, hygiene and epidemiology. This first staff comprises 13 officers. The first class joined the school on February 1, 1907. The school was inaugurated on September 29, 1907, by General Louis Archinard, Commander of the Colonial Army Corps.

As France's colonial, decolonization, and cooperation policies evolved, and as the health function of the armed forces was reformed, the scope and name of the school changed.

== Schools before World War I (1905–1914) ==
The École du Pharo became the headquarters for doctors and pharmacists serving overseas (public health) or with colonial troops (in France and overseas). Its first official title was École d'application du service de santé des troupes coloniales.

=== Premises and location ===
The agreement signed in April 1905 between the city and the Ministry of War allocated to the new school the western part of the Jardin du Pharo, at the foot of the brand-new anatomy institute, opposite the field of maneuvers. A three-story building plus a half-basement was erected for teaching and administration purposes. In addition, the pavilion at the left entrance to the park was allocated as accommodation for the school's director. This was the counterpart of the pavilion allocated to the park's janitors and junior staff, which did not please the Director of the Colonial Army Corps Health Service.

The town remains the owner of the land and buildings, which are subject to an emphyteutic lease. In addition, the Ministry of War, which had vast holdings in the district, allocated premises to the new school at Fort d'Entrecasteaux (a military site located on the other side of Boulevard du Pharo, which became Boulevard Charles Livon in 1922).

=== Mission and teaching ===
From the outset, the school's vocation was to provide practical rather than theoretical training for doctors and pharmacists who had already graduated, as stated in the decree of October 3, 1905: "to provide second-class medical officers and pharmacists and trainee (Note: Rank corresponding to that of second lieutenant in the general military hierarchy.) medical officers and pharmacists in the Colonial Army with the special professional, theoretical and above all practical training required to fulfill the service obligations of the Colonial Army Medical Corps in France and the colonies... ".

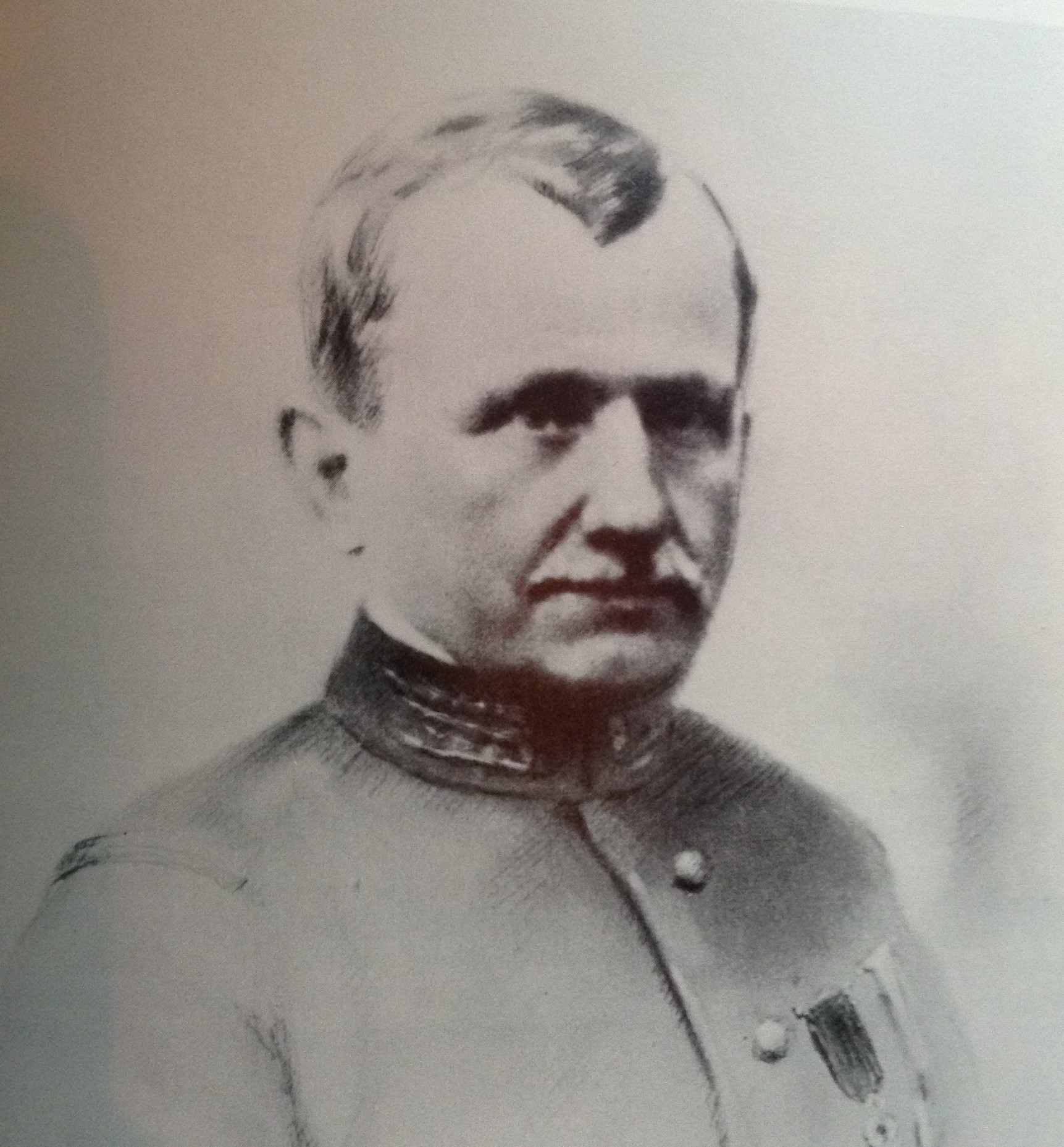
Albert Clarac, first director of the École du Pharo.

The first teachers were the school's directors, including Albert Clarac, who began work on his voluminous Traité de pathologie exotique, clinique et thérapeutique, the first volumes of which were published during his time as director of the school, and Paul-Louis Simond, a renowned pastor who had just discovered the role of the flea in the transmission of the plague.

Theoretical teaching originally comprised 6 sections:

1. Diseases of hot countries.
2. Army surgery and special diseases.
3. Bacteriology, parasitology, hygiene, and prophylaxis of tropical diseases.
4. Sanitary police, forensic medicine, health service administration.
5. Surgical anatomy, surgical medicine, and equipment.
6. Chemistry, toxicology, pharmacy.

Practical training is provided in the school's laboratories and the departments of Marseille's civilian and military hospitals.

Students are admitted according to their graduation rank from the École de Bordeaux. Civilian doctors and pharmacists who have volunteered for service may be accepted based on a competitive examination. The training lasts eight months, from February to October, and ends with a final grading. Work was therefore intensive, and trainees were subject to military discipline.

From 1907 to 1914, the school trained 258 students, including 241 doctors and 17 pharmacists, at a time when, in 1911, the French colonial empire covered 11 million km^{2} and had a population of 45 million. The structures were in place, but recruitment remained insufficient, as careers were deemed unattractive. Those who chose to become colonial physicians did so because of their difficulties in metropolitan France and out of a sense of vocation and adventure. Many colonial doctors came from modest backgrounds (often from Brittany), attracted by the free military schools.

With the general mobilization of 1914, the school had to close and remained so until 1922. Twenty-one Colonial Medical Corps doctors were killed in the First World War, almost the equivalent of a graduating class.

== Colonial apogee (1922–1954) ==
This prolonged closure led to a long crisis linked to persistent recruitment problems. The colonial medical corps was affected by departures and resignations. Despite propaganda campaigns extolling the virtues of a career as a colonial physician, "Indochina was accepted, but a few candidates applied for Cameroon, Togo and the AOF, but none for the AEF".

As early as 1924, Édouard Daladier, Minister for the Colonies, and his successor André Hesse, increased career benefits. The school was reorganized in 1928.

=== Location ===
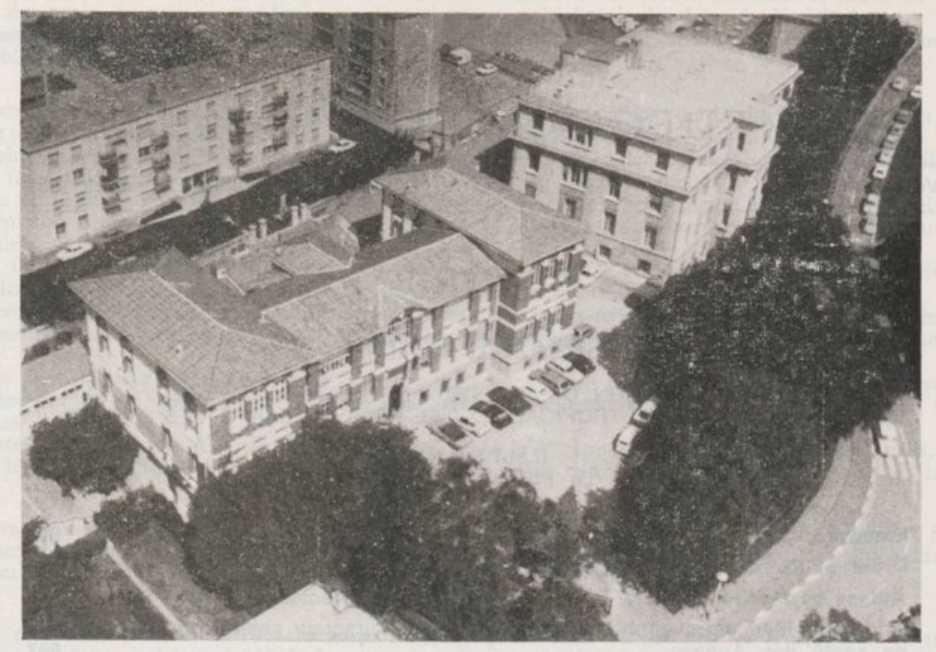
Aerial view of 1905 and 1932 buildings.

By 1928, the number of pupils enrolled had made the premises too cramped, prompting the principal to ask the city for new premises. In 1932, the construction of a new building to the west of the first was launched to increase capacity. Badly deteriorated at the time of the Liberation, it was raised by one floor in 1948 and became the Tropical Medicine Research and Documentation Centre in 1950. Over time, other smaller buildings were added to the school's footprint, both in the Parc du Pharo and in the military annexes of Fort d'Entrecasteaux, where a former powder magazine was converted into a building housing the historical archives of the Colonial Army Medical Corps.

=== Education and research ===
The need to structure a teaching body while allowing career advancement in the tropics was obvious. At the instigation of Pierre L'Herminier, Director between 1926 and 1931, a competitive examination was held for the agrégation du Corps de santé colonial, based on the principle already developed at the École du Val-de-Grâce. The first professors appointed took up their posts in 1930 for a normal five-year term. These associate professors (most of whom worked at the Marseille military hospital or in the school's laboratories) were grouped into chairs around a full professor, who himself held office for 5 to 8 years. This rotation of posts ensures that the teaching staff always have recent and renewed experience of the tropical health environment. In this way, a teaching corps was formed, recognized under the generic term "Agrégés du Pharo", which even coordinated the production of textbooks under a collective name. The Pharo's pedagogy is therefore based on knowledge, conviviality, and pragmatism.

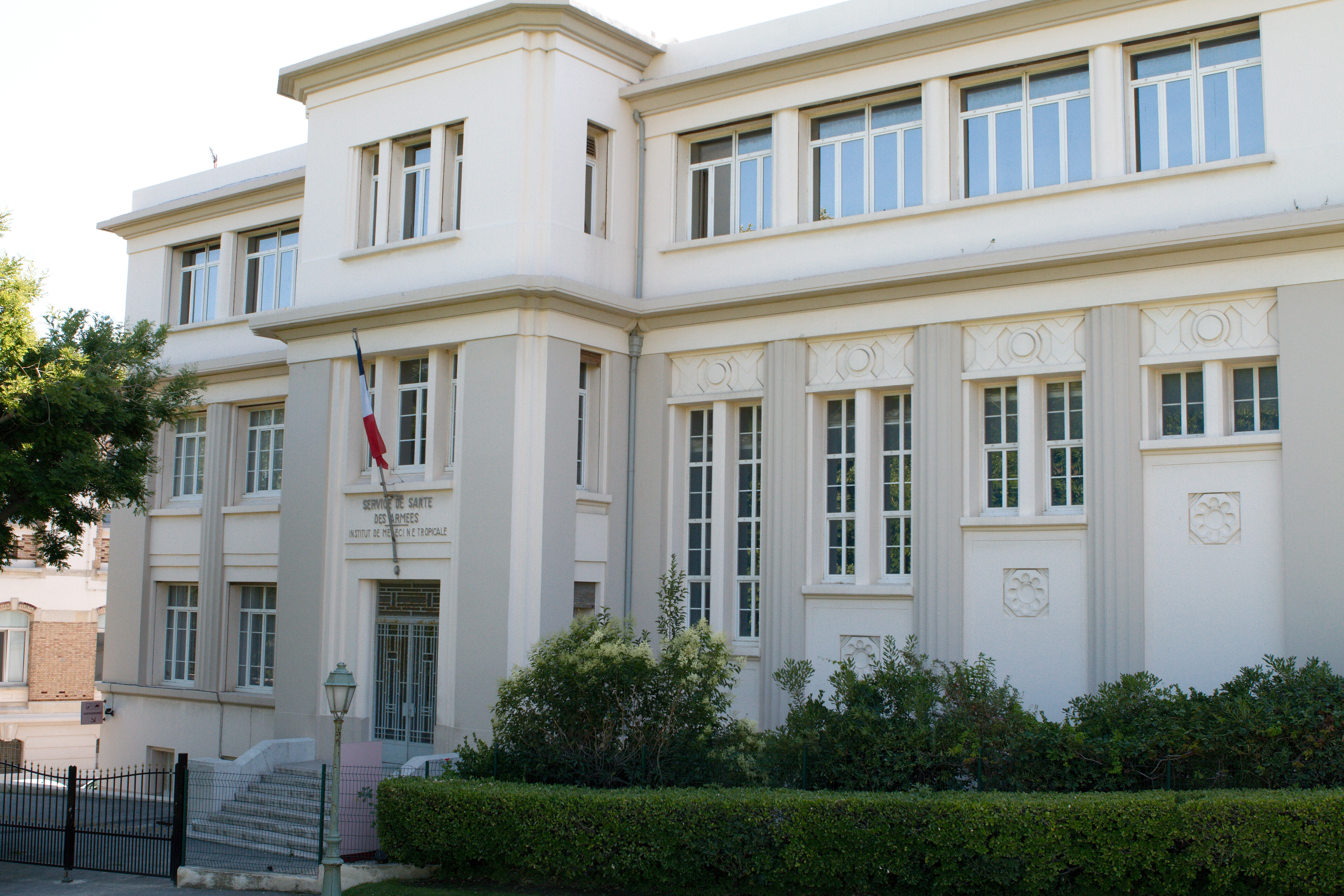
The research and documentation center building, built in 1934 and raised in 1948.

This reform transformed the school into a large, specialized higher education establishment, with new disciplines: neuropsychiatry (1928), ophthalmology (1934), stomatology (1935), and radio-electrology (1935)... In the 1930s, the school set up a documentation and research center, initially medical, which was also opened to colonial pharmacists in 1936. The center was dedicated to researching overseas health problems, but this new requirement was discontinued in 1939.

Growing demand from the colonies led to an increase in the graduates, with the 1933 graduating class comprising 121 doctors and 11 pharmacists. From 1922 to 1939, the École du Pharo trained 982 physicians and 98 pharmacists. The creation of a colonial section at the École du service de santé militaire in Lyon in 1925 improved recruitment8 by around 25%, although it was still insufficient for the 70 million inhabitants of the French Empire at the time. In 1936, the Colonial Medical Corps numbered 1,006 officers (919 doctors and 87 pharmacists).

=== World War II and Indochina (1939–1954) ===
With the declaration of war on September 3, 1939, the school closed again, only to be reopened by the Vichy regime. Graduates dropped to low numbers: 21 in 1940, 24 in 1941. Exceptional recruitment of two classes, one per semester, was made in 1942 (65 doctors and 4 pharmacists).

In November 1942, the Germans occupied the free zone. The second, newer building was requisitioned by the occupying forces, who also disrupted Marseille's military hospitals. The École du Pharo continued to operate, retreating to its oldest premises. It welcomed students from the Lyon colonial section, with a graduating class of 30 in 1943, and 48 in 1944.

During the war, the Colonial Medical Corps was divided like the rest of the army, with some accepting Vichy and others joining the Free French. Among the 26 military physicians (22 active and 4 mobilized) who were made Companions of the Liberation, there were no fewer than 19 former students of the Pharo. (Note: They are Raoul Béon, Guy Charmot, Guy Chauliac, Guy Chavenon, Jean Coupigny, Adolphe Diagne, Xavier Gillot, Paul Guénon, Paul Guillon, Yves Hervé, Jean Laquintinie, Charles Mauric, Henri Montfort, Marcel Orsini, Adolphe Sicé, Pol Thibaux, Jean-Frédéric Vernier, Jean Vialard-Goudou, and Charles Vignes.) During the conflict, the Colonial Army Medical Corps lost 21 doctors and one administrative officer to enemy action outside the Indochinese theater.

During the fighting for the liberation of Marseille (August 1944), the premises were severely damaged, in particular the research building, built in 1932 and inaugurated in 1934, which was partly burnt down. In November 1944, the doctor Colonel Jean Vialard-Goudou, a hero of Bir-Hakeim, was appointed to reorganize the school, which moved back into renovated premises on March 1, 1945.

The Indochina War (1945-1954), which began with the Japanese coup of March 9, 1945, and continued with the opposition between France and the Viet Minh, was the deadliest conflict for the Colonial Medical Corps, which lost 34 officers, including 26 killed by the enemy, 5 duty casualties and 3 missing in action (mer).

From 1945 to 1954, the school trained 453 doctors, 56 pharmacists, and 19 administrative officers. This marked the return of a staffing crisis, apparently linked to an uncertain future and a "moral crisis" as decolonization began.

In 1954, the creation of the Centre d'études et de recherche en médecine tropicale within the school led to an initial change of name to École d'application et center d'instruction et de recherche du service de santé des troupes coloniales.

== Decolonization (1955–1974) ==
On June 24, 1955, President René Coty awarded the school's flag the Chevalier de la Légion d'Honneur cross, and the Croix de Guerre 1939-1945.

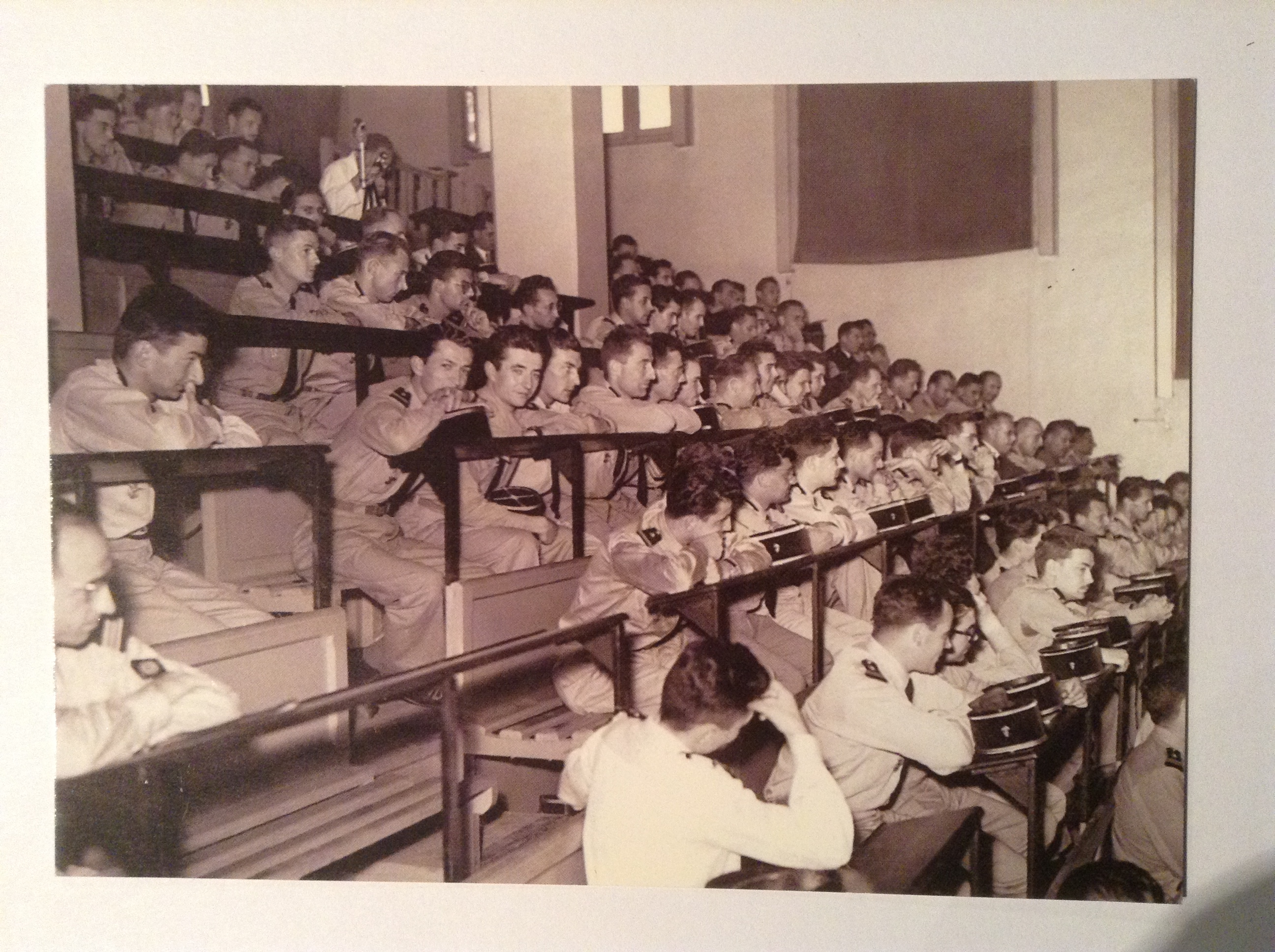
The 1960 promotion of doctors and pharmacists when choosing their exit positions.

In 1958, the gradual transformation of colonial troops led to their renaming as overseas troops. The school adapted accordingly, becoming the École d'application et center d'instruction et de recherche du service de santé des troupes d'outre-mer. As both a school and a research center and thanks to its close partnership with the Michel-Lévy military hospital (Marseille), where all the heads of the department now belonged to the Overseas Troops Health Service, the Pharo School played a decisive role in the constant upgrading of staff skills. In 1959, for example, the Medical Corps could count on 20 military professors and 12 military physicians who were either associate professors or lecturers at civilian faculties.

In 1961, the overseas troops reverted to their former nineteenth-century name, the troupes de marine. The school then became the École d'application et center d'instruction et de recherche du service de santé des troupes de marine.

In 1966, at the request of the French Ministry of Cooperation, the school took in active national service volunteer doctors (VSNA), who later became national service cooperants (CSN). They are trained at the rate of one, then two, promotions per year before leaving for what is almost always their first job.

In 1968, the Navy Medical Corps was integrated into the Army Medical Corps. A single medical application school was to be set up at the Val-de-Grâce in Paris, with specialization schools for the navy, air force, and army, with the École du Pharo fulfilling the latter function for the army. Hence its new name in 1970: École de spécialisation du service de santé pour l'armée de terre et institut de pathologie exotique.

The school also welcomed foreign students, almost exclusively from Africa. Far from diminishing the school's role, decolonization has, on the contrary, amplified its importance, particularly with foreign governments and international organizations.

== Tropical medicine and cooperation (1975–1997) ==
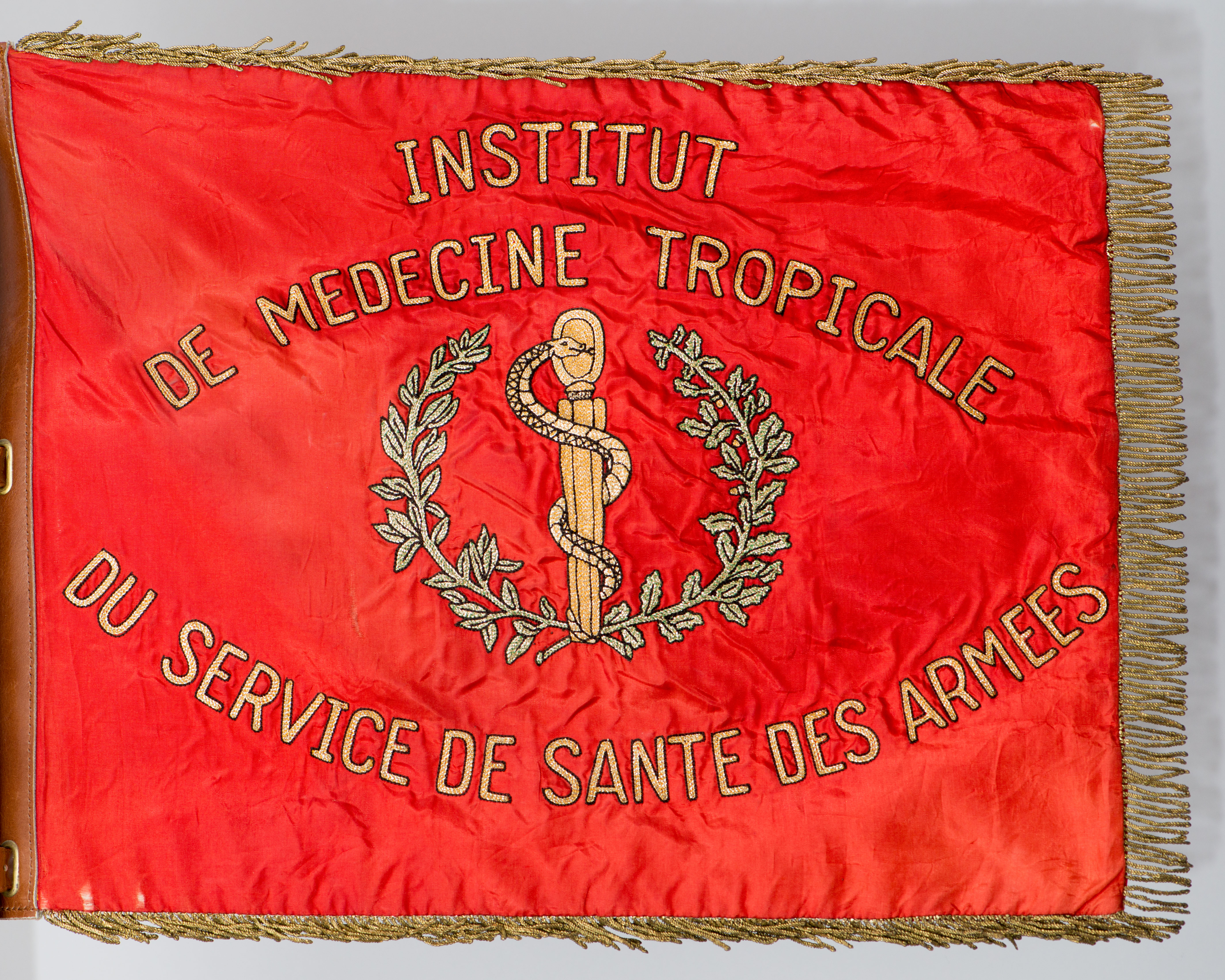
Pennant of the Institut de médecine tropicale du Service de santé des armées, recto.

In 1975, the previous reform was amended. The specialization schools, all three of which included research centers specific to their field of employment, were transformed into institutes. The school became the Institut de médecine tropicale du service de santé des armées. (Note: In the SSA, only schools are allocated a flag as part of their traditional heritage. Other units (institutes, hospitals, etc.) are given a traditional pennant10. The flag of the École du Pharo was returned and the new institute was given a pennant, but the mission remained unchanged.)

The training of national service volunteers requires several annual sessions of the diploma in tropical medicine, co-delivered with the Marseille Faculty of Medicine.

In the mid-1990s, the French government decided to discontinue its policy of substitutive cooperation. The number of French health cooperants to be trained declined sharply, all the more so as the national service obligation was abolished in 1997, ending the recruitment of volunteer doctors for cooperation abroad and in French tropical overseas territories. In all, over more than 30 years, more than 2,000 national service doctors began their careers with an internship at the École du Pharo.

== The last turning point (1997–2013) ==
Since the early 2000s, the evolution of the French armed forces' external commitments has been strongly oriented towards operations in combat situations, in which troops have a high rotation rate and support for civilian populations becomes a secondary activity.

=== Foreign operations ===
As a result, the need for in-depth knowledge of tropical diseases, particularly infectious pathologies, loses its relative importance in terms of the emergency, disaster, and war medicine capacity requirements of French military doctors. The École du Pharo needs to refocus its basic training not just on tropical diseases, but also on the needs of wartime and disaster situations. A new "brevet de médecine des missions extérieures" (diploma in medicine for overseas missions) was created, the latest incarnation of the Pharo diploma.

In 2004, the French reform of the third cycle of medical studies affected the course of studies for young military doctors. Henceforth, future practitioners are required to choose a specialty at the end of the second cycle, and the third cycle is extended to three years for future specialists in general medicine, who complete their internship with a three-month placement at the Pharo.

The Army Medical Corps adapts. In 2005, the École du Val-de-Grâce was established as the only specialization school of the Armed Forces Medical Corps, responsible for all medical, paramedical, and sanitary training for the entire medical corps. The École du Pharo celebrated its centenary in style. Since the creation of the agrégation competitive examination in 1929, the school has "consumed" 117 full professors, seconded by 38 assistant professors, who have been succeeded by 169 agrégés, a high rate of renewal that guarantees the ever-present desire for teaching to be delivered by people working in the field, taking turns between the tropics and Marseille. Since 1982, it has also trained 11 foreign African military associate professors.

In 2008, as part of the government's "Révision générale des politiques publiques" (RGPP), a major reform of the armed forces was launched, underpinned by a drive for savings and rationalization. The decision was taken to merge all Health Service research centers into a single institute and to transfer teaching activities to the Val-de-Grâce school. The École du Pharo was closed in 2013.

=== Shutdown and closure ===
The latest internship was for army hospital interns completing their general medicine internship in 2011, during which they validated the "brevet de médecine des missions extérieures".

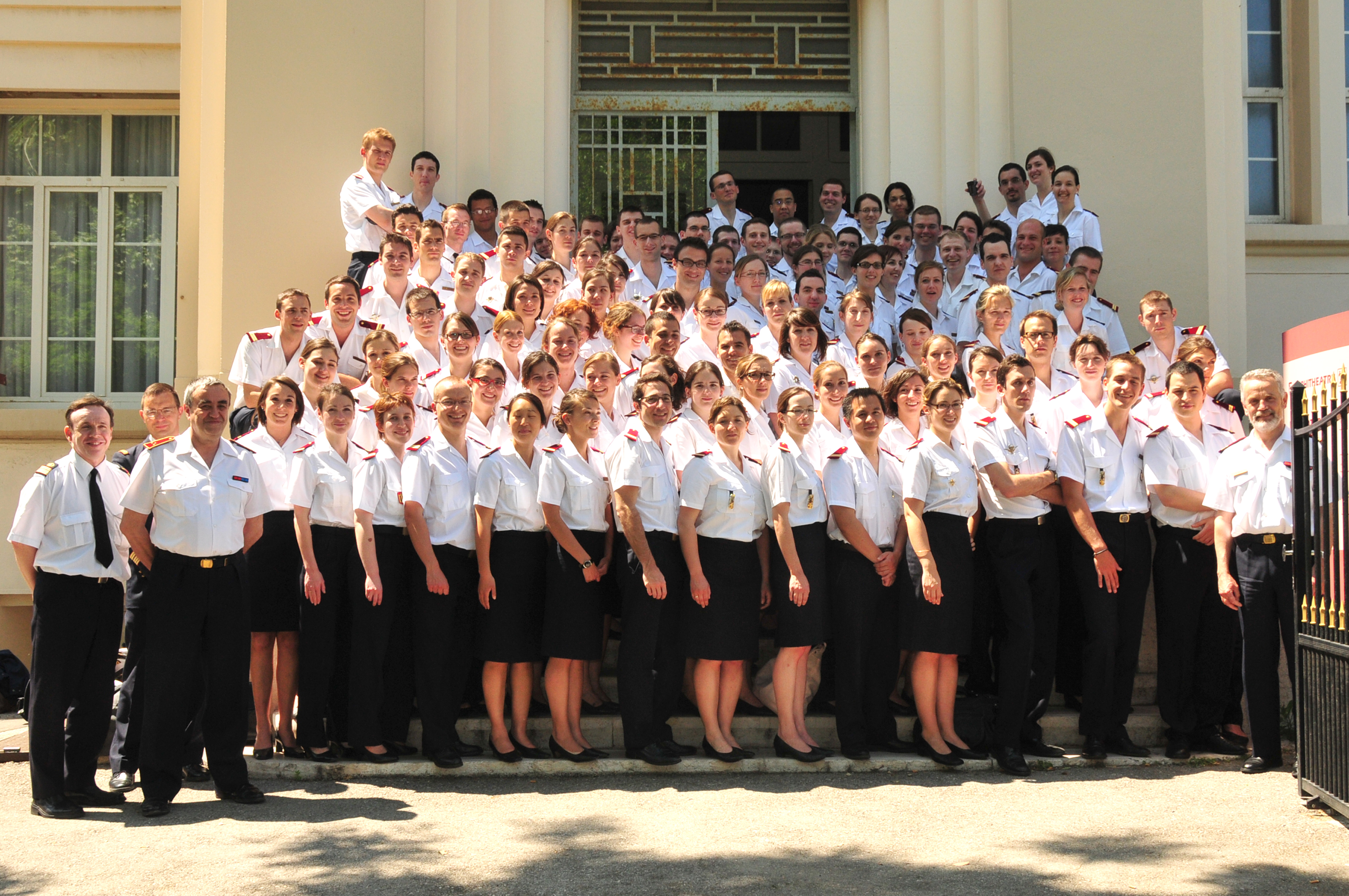
2011, the last class of interns at the École du Pharo.

The XVIIth and final edition of Actualités du Pharo, organized by the École du Pharo, was also held in 2011, with the main theme of Au chevet de la santé de la mère. The organization (and right to use the name) was then handed over to the Groupe d'intervention en santé publique et épidémiologie (GISPE).

The latest issue of Médecine Tropicale was published in the first quarter of 2012. It is devoted to a review of the lessons learned from the Chikungunya virus crisis since 2006, bringing the 72-volume series to a close.

In June 2013, the École du Pharo bids farewell to Marseille; during the ceremony marking the end of activities, the pennant is rolled up for the last time and will join the Armed Forces Biomedical Research Institute after more than 8,000 doctors and other healthcare professionals have been trained within its walls in their medical-tropical art6.

=== The school and its missions ===
As a practical school, the Pharo cultivated an original approach to teaching, in which trainees were encouraged to carry out their procedures, and whose teachers were practitioners with solid experience in the field. The young trainee doctors, all generalists, were promised very isolated posts, with no qualified laboratory technicians, surgeons nearby, or imaging manipulators, and had to carry out basic laboratory and imaging techniques, surgical set-ups, or complete procedures themselves.

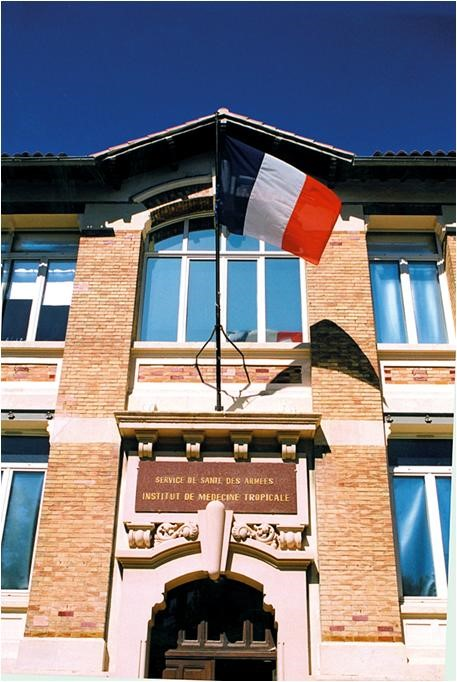
Facade of the historic building in 2010.

This requires training laboratories and experimental operating theatres in addition to training grounds at the military hospital, as well as skills for relieving casualties in perilous situations. But professional isolation also requires training in automotive mechanics, cold chain management, health economics, human resources management, and so on.

The school's initial vocation has never wavered. And 75 years after its creation, Jacques Voelckel, then Director, was able to say: "... the specificity of the École du Pharo rests on a certain number of constants... The first is linked to the pragmatism of its teaching. Effectively preparing young practitioners, trained in metropolitan faculties, to practice in poor countries has always been... the priority objective of the Pharo teaching staff. This preparation takes full account of the particularities of the tropical environment and the imperatives of underdevelopment. This is all the more important given that employment in rural areas is the rule for most students graduating from the institute. The more or less severe conditions of isolation and the need to be able to adapt to new and changing situations reinforce the utilitarian nature of this teaching... the experience of our elders proves invaluable here. Another constant observed... is the perfect exploitation of the virtues attached to the military state in view of the harsh requirements of a very specific medical action. A sense of public service, a sense of responsibility, the need for action and a concern for efficiency are all qualities required for these jobs. Throughout its history, the school has had 3 missions:

1. training in tropical medicine, for doctors and pharmacists, later extended to nurses and laboratory technicians, both military and civilian.
2. research into tropical diseases (malaria, cerebrospinal meningitis, and arboviruses) of such importance that it led to the renaming of the establishment in 1954.
3. of expertise in epidemic-related humanitarian crises (either on its premises, using its laboratories, or interventionally, providing field expertise) and epidemiological surveillance for the French armed forces.

In 1949, a "Technical Inspectorate of Tropical Pathology" was set up in Paris to advise commanders on health risks for troops deployed in the tropics. In 1968, this inspectorate was transferred to the École du Pharo, where it was the school's deputy director who performed this function until the inspectorate was abolished in 1981.

== Teaching ==
At the Pharo, training is organized around programs by an original teaching staff who are constantly developing teaching tools. Programs evolved over the years, but the training course for military physicians and pharmacists remained the main constant throughout history, with regular adaptations such as the introduction of new disciplines like psychiatry in 1928, ophthalmology in 1934, stomatology and radiology in 1935. The duration of the program also changed, fluctuating between 4 and 8 months. The introductory course in tropical medicine for volunteer national service physicians was offered in two eight-week sessions a year. Continuing training for military doctors took the form of specialization courses to prepare for the SSA competitive examination, with joint supervision by the Pharo and the Marseille military hospital (Hôpital Michel-Lévy until 1963, then Hôpital Laveran).

There are also continuing education courses for military practitioners, organized in one or more annual sessions according to health priorities in tropical zones (the first of which was perhaps the Francophone nutrition course created in 1952) and in the forces (malaria control course, course devoted to the prevention of sexually transmitted infections and AIDS, technical gestures for forward resuscitation, introduction to medical entomology, advanced video-surgery, aspects of medicine in overseas operations, etc.). ) and, in 2005, no fewer than 7 diploma courses organized in conjunction with the Marseille Faculty of Medicine.

Some of these continuing education courses are open to civilian practitioners, such as training in leprosy surgery (see box). The original teaching tools consisted of practical in vivo teaching of surgical and resuscitation techniques, and from 1963 onwards, the integration of all possible means of distance learning enabled practitioners in isolated posts to prepare for all SSA professional competitive examinations. In 1983, no fewer than 417 recorded preparatory sessions were made available and broadcast. The teaching staff is made up of the Pharo's associate professors and their specialist colleagues, who are renewed on average every 5 years, alternating between Marseilles and the tropics, making the Pharo a veritable hub of lively companionship.

Leprosy surgery involves surgical intervention to overcome the limitations of drug treatment. It can be palliative (correction of an infirmity) or preventive and requires intervention on nerves at risk to prevent nerve-related paralysis or trophic disorders (often called decompression surgery). From the 1950s onwards, dapsone, the first effective drug, began to be used on a massive scale. However, it is unable to bring about regression of long-standing and painful nerve damage, where hypertrophied nerves are compressed in narrow anatomical passages. Leprosy nerve surgery was to be developed over this decade, particularly at the instigation of Pierre Bourrel, in Bamako and then at the Pharo, where he taught it from 1967 to 1992. The originality of this teaching lies in the fact that Bourrel has simplified surgical techniques and intends to teach them both to experienced surgeons and to young trainee doctors, both civilian and military, French and non-French, who attend the Pharo School when they are or will be in charge of leprosy patients. It organizes short sessions with practical exercises on anatomical subjects twice a year. This choice enables simple techniques to be widely disseminated to the greatest number of patients, even those far from specialized surgical centers

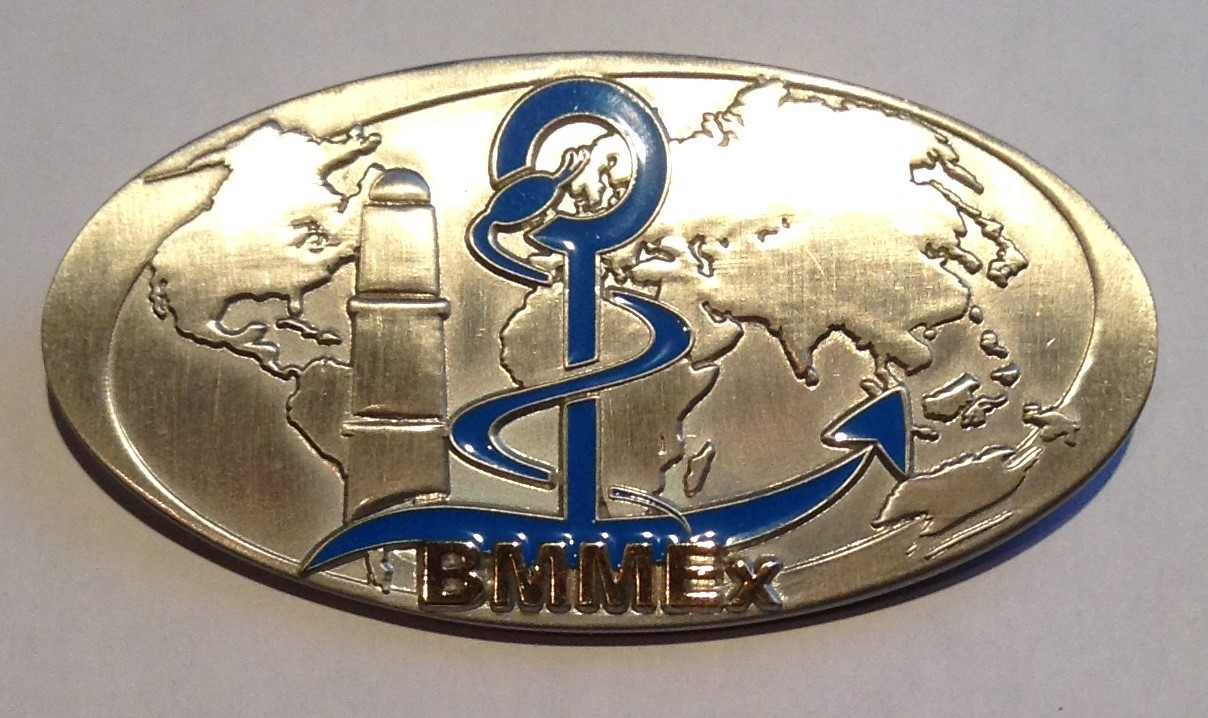
Insignia for the brevet de médecine des missions extérieures, the last diploma issued by the École du Pharo.

At the time of its creation, and for a long time to come, the school did not issue a diploma in the common sense of the term. Initially, the students were all French military personnel, assigned to the school for an internship at the request of their employer. They did not receive a parchment, and only a mention of their internship was made in their military file. The opening up of the school to a large number of foreign military personnel and even more civilian practitioners, as well as changes in university practices, led the school to issue training certificates and attestations and to seek validation of its training by the university. The school also responded to the requirements of the Ministry of the Colonies, by creating specific training courses to meet the development needs of military and civilian health professionals in the colonies. The first French-language nutrition course, recommended by the first inter-African conference on food and nutrition, held in Dschang (Cameroon) in 1949, was designed, organized and repeated at the Pharo between 1952 and 1955 under the direction of Pharmacist Colonel Autret, before being exported to Africa. In addition, as the University increasingly relied on military teachers to form its teaching teams, university validations of the courses delivered at Le Pharo were obtained.

In 1961, training courses for laboratory technicians, radio technicians, and anesthesiologists were launched, followed in 1966 by two annual training courses, initially lasting six weeks, for young VSNA doctors wishing to serve under the Ministry of Cooperation. In 1976, courses were inaugurated for VSNAs working for the French Ministry of Foreign Affairs, who were to serve in the Maghreb. The teaching offered was post-graduate and adapted to the countries in which they were assigned. In addition, foreign military trainees from African countries come to follow courses in tropical medicine or specialties in partnership with and at the Hôpital d'instruction des armées Laveran. Many of these trainees applied to take competitive examinations for the military medical service, and the first foreign associate professors were appointed in 1979, with almost a dozen going on to become full professors.

Relations with the academic world are developing, and the teaching staff at Le Pharo play an active role in the teaching of the UER de médecine tropicale de Marseille, which takes place either at the faculty or at the École du Pharo, whose trainees are awarded the diplôme universitaire de médecine tropicale de la faculté de Marseille. Professors at the Pharo also teach at other faculties: Bordeaux, Lyon, Toulouse and Paris. In 1997, the École du Pharo played an active role in the creation in Lyon, on the initiative of Doctor Charles Mérieux, of the European Centre for Humanitarian Health, (Note: A public interest group made up of 7 institutional partners: Université Claude Bernard Lyon 1, Université de la Méditerranée Aix-Marseille II, Hospices civils de Lyon, Assistance publique-Hôpitaux de Marseille, Service de santé des armées, Fondation Mérieux, École nationale vétérinaire de Lyon, this center was a cross-disciplinary tool for training, information and research in the humanitarian field.) to which the École du Pharo has provided all its successive directors.

The public health priorities of the armed forces call for appropriate control programs, all of which include a training component for general practitioners serving in the forces. The school develops short but repeated continuing training courses in paludology, in the fight against sexually transmitted infections and AIDS, and in forward resuscitation. Cooperation between European institutes of tropical medicine led to the creation of the European Tropical Epidemiology Course, in which the school played an active part, hosting a session in 1986.

== Research center ==
As knowledge evolved, the need for research laboratories became apparent as early as 1936. A ministerial letter dated September 16, 1947, called for the creation of a "tropical medicine research and documentation center". This was finally created in 1953 by Physician General Raynal, which led to the school's name being changed to 1954. In its early days, the Pharo research center focused its work in four main directions:

1. From 1955, the first research program, led by pharmacist Commandant Busson, focused on nutritional biochemistry (analysis of West African food plants).
2. This was followed by the experimental trypanosomiasis research program with Gallais.
3. In 1963, Léon Lapeyssonnie created the Bacteriology and Epidemiology of Cerebrospinal Meningitis Unit, which in 1964 became home to the WHO Collaborating Center for Meningococcal Reference and Research. This center is the reference for African laboratories participating in the reinforced surveillance of meningitis.
4. Finally, Jean Nicoli opened the Molecular Biology Center, with a unit for the structural biochemistry of vaccine antigens and the molecular biology of viral development.

External videos
- Report from the École du Pharo in 2007 on Jean-Marie Milleliri's YouTube account.

Subsequently, the laboratories' research lines evolved in line with health priorities in tropical zones and defense needs in terms of biological risk.

Thus, following the outbreaks of human and equine encephalitis in the Camargue in 1963, Nicoli oriented his research unit towards virology applied to arboviruses. He equipped it with a safety level 3 laboratory. Successively involved in research on dengue fever, Rift Valley fever and the chikungunya virus, it developed a strong diagnostics activity to meet the needs of highly exposed armies in tropical zones, and in 2012 became the Centre national de référence - Arbovirus.

In 1977, the corps of army veterinary biologists was attached to the Army Health Service, leading to the creation of the Section vétérinaire d'étude et de recherche en physiologie et pathologie animale (SVERPPA) at the École du Pharo. In November 1979, the research laboratories were restructured into the Centre d'étude et de recherche en médecine tropicale. In 1980, faced with the growing risk of malaria among French forces deployed in Africa, due to the emergence of parasite resistance to available preventive treatments, the center created a major research laboratory dedicated to Plasmodium, organized into two units. One, more focused on the physiology and pharmacology of the parasite, became a laboratory associated with the National Reference Center - Malaria in 2007. The other focuses more on parasite epidemiology, molecular markers and the in vitro activity of antimalarial drugs.

In 60 years of research, the École du Pharo has made major scientific advances in its chosen fields.

=== Advances in nutritional research ===
This line of research, the first to be developed at the École du Pharo's biochemical research laboratory, was in response to a long-standing injunction from the Ministry of Colonies (circular dated April 4, 1925), asking the physicians and pharmacists of the Colonial Troops Health Service to study the food hygiene problems of the indigenous populations. The aim was to collect the plants traditionally used for food in Africa, to establish the exact species identification and then to define the biochemical composition, particularly the protein content, of the edible part. Félix-François Busson, a pioneer in chromatography, devoted his career to this field, culminating in his thesis in 1965 and the publication of an encyclopaedic work. For example, he demonstrated that fonio (Digitaria exilic), a grass from the Sudan savannah, has remarkable nutritional properties (rich in methionine) found in no other grass. He also studied cowpeas (Vigna unguiculata), a close relative of beans, but whose cultivation properties and ability to satisfy human food requirements are far superior to those of beans. Busson's work is as much about describing the nutritional qualities of African plants as it is about demonstrating the ability of local populations to identify those that are best suited to their needs, thus becoming an ethnobotanist.

=== Advances in knowledge of bacterial meningitis ===
As soon as the laboratory was created, Léon Lapeyssonnie published his landmark study, in which he described for the first time the limits of the area of expansion of cerebrospinal meningitis epidemics in intertropical Africa. This area is delimited according to a climatic criterion rather than a strictly geographical one, the isohyet. Indeed, it is between isohyets 300 mm and 1,100 mm that the epidemics ravaging Africa are most severe.

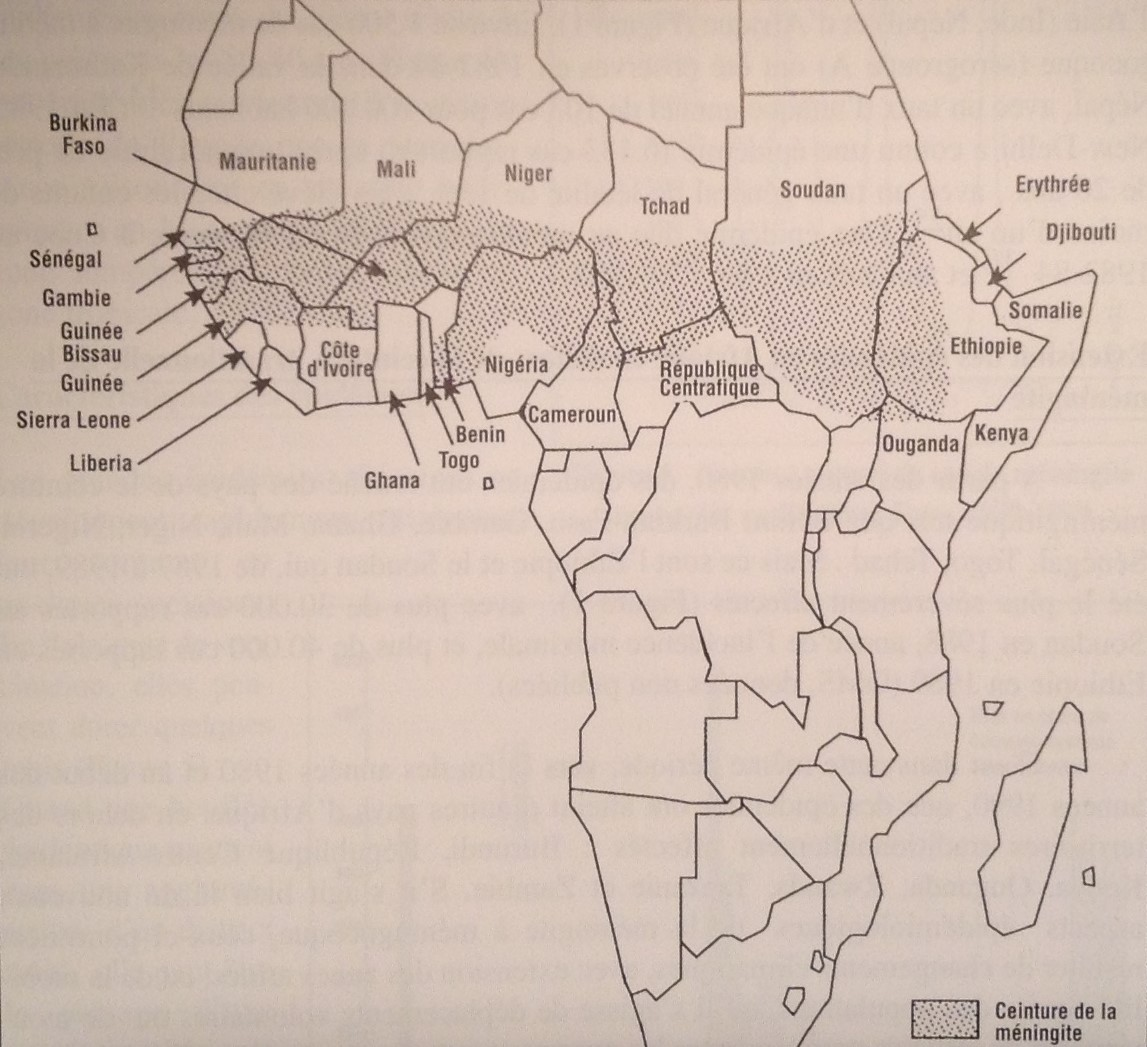
Map showing the limits of the African meningitis belt described by Lapeyssonnie in 1963.

This band around Africa has since been known as the Lapeyssonnie meningitis belt. The laboratory has worked on locating meningococci on all five continents, and particularly in Africa for 50 years, providing research for the evolution of the epidemiology of this disease, based on the extreme variability of the bacteria and their sensitivity to antibiotics, and proposing suitable diagnostic methods.

=== Advances in virology research ===
The worldwide emergence of Chikungunya virus fever in the 2000s illustrates the contributions of clinical and virological research carried out jointly by the École du Pharo research center and the departments of the Hôpital d'instruction des armées Laveran: detection in Africa of a new lineage of chikungunya virus, development of new diagnostic tools and production of antigens for them, detection of the emergence of the virus in America, description of new clinical and paraclinical aspects of the disease, first detection of the virus in the cornea, with implications for corneal transplant policy in France.

=== Advances in malaria research ===
In the 1980s, the appearance and spread of resistance by malaria parasites to the molecules used for prophylaxis and treatment of patients prompted the French and North American armies to set up research programs aimed at gaining a better understanding of the parasites and the means of combating them. Two successive drug prophylaxis strategies were developed by the school's researchers. Firstly, the combination of chloroquine and proguanil, used from 1990 onwards, then the use of doxycycline monohydrate at the turn of the millennium. As each new molecule used in turn provoked the development of resistance strategies on the part of the parasites, the Pharo researchers also discovered the appearance of decreases in sensitivity to doxycycline.

=== Public health and epidemiology ===
The school has always had a mission to teach public health initiatives. A well-known example is Eugène Jamot, who belonged to the school's first graduating class. He quickly realized that the needs of entire rural populations could not be met with the resources available. In Cameroon, faced with an epidemic of sleeping sickness, he developed a specific, mobile and systematic method of combating the disease, which would soon become the model for public health action for several generations of doctors who graduated from the Pharo School.

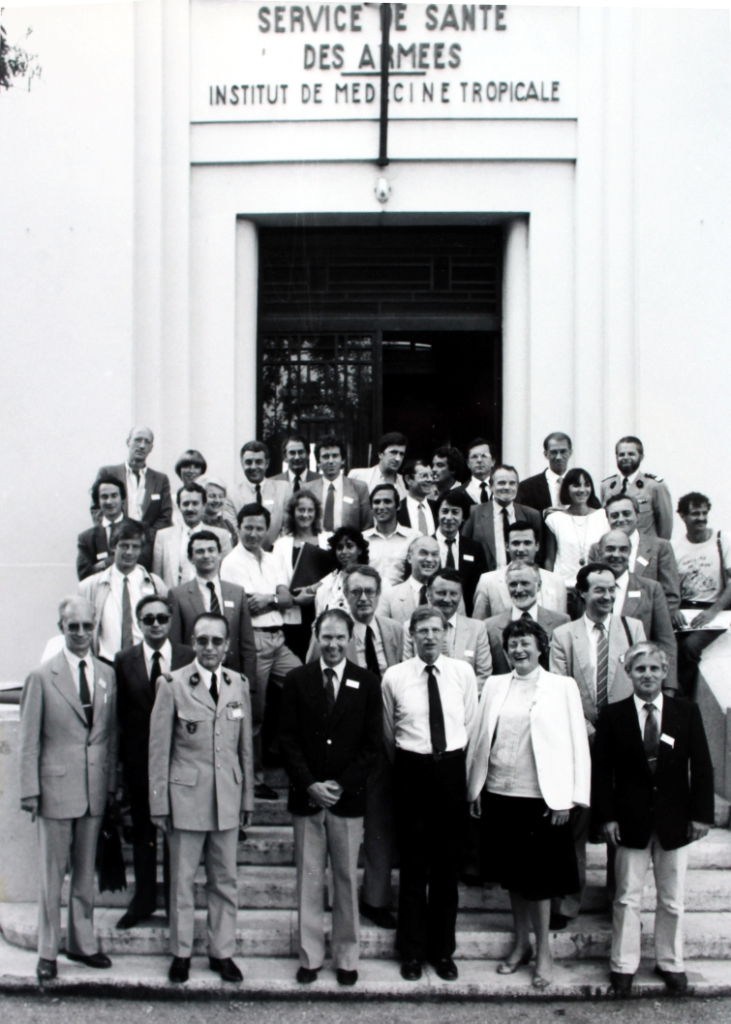
First community health days organized in 1983 at the Pharo.

The Jamot method has been reproduced elsewhere and extended to all the major African endemics, as much as it has been criticized. Nevertheless, it remains one of the oldest examples of a public health program applied to colonized African populations, even in the decades following decolonization.

Colonial physicians had their skills recognized through a professional course of study known as "specialization in the fight against major endemics", whose very title shows that it concerned civilian populations, particularly in the African context. In 1981, this course was entrusted to Claude Gateff, who overhauled it by introducing, on the one hand, training in the statistical methodology essential to the choice of health priorities and the evaluation of programs, and on the other, training in the development and management of public health programs.

The creation in France of a Diplôme d'Etudes Spécialisées en Santé Publique et Médecine Sociale in 1985, open to both military and civilian doctors, led to the abolition of the specialty in the fight against major endemics, whose last specialists were appointed in 1990. Since then, the École du Pharo has trained almost all military public health specialists. The creation within the school of a department of community medicine and a teaching chair of the same name, provided support for this training and enabled the school to maintain a team of experts who would gradually redirect their public health programs from African populations to French military populations.

In 2003, the department became an Epidemiology and Public Health Department. It coordinates all epidemiological surveillance within the armed forces deployed outside mainland France and in the south of France; it develops the concept of defense health watch in order to provide early warning of all phenomena that could be a source of risk for the armed forces wherever they may be. It also conducts epidemiological and clinical research into preventive measures for the armed forces, and is developing expertise in medical entomology. In 2005, the Chair of Community Medicine became the Chair of Epidemiology and Prevention applied to the Armed Forces at the Val-de-Grâce School. In 2011, in preparation for the closure of the École du Pharo, the Centre d'Epidémiologie et de Santé Publique des Armées (Army Epidemiology and Public Health Center) was created in Marseille, taking over all activities in this field in the armed forces.

=== Fighting epidemics and military Bioforce ===
This involves responding to external requests for expertise, whether French or foreign, military or non-military, during epidemic crises for example. In such cases, the school is able to provide all or part of an intervention team capable of investigating an epidemic in order to understand its causes, propose control measures and, where possible, implement a vaccination campaign.

The meningococcal laboratory, created by Léon Lapeyssonnie, maintains a team on permanent standby to vaccinate any community, military or otherwise, in which a case of meningococcal meningitis is reported.

In 1983, the French Ministries of Defense, Foreign Affairs and Cooperation, Institut Mérieux and Pasteur Production signed an agreement at the instigation of Doctor Charles Mérieux, creating a military Bioforce. This structure enables an investigation and control team to be mobilized at very short notice to deal with emerging diseases with high epidemic potential, such as meningococcal meningitis, measles, yellow fever and cholera. When required, Bioforce, supplied by the industrial partners of the initial agreement, leads the implementation of a vaccination campaign. Between 1985 and 1999, 26 military Bioforce missions were carried out in Africa, Latin America and the Balkans by personnel from the école.

== Documentation center ==
The school's documentation center includes a library, the school's communications unit, which is heavily involved in the organization of conferences and symposia, and the editorial staff of the journal Médecine tropicale.

=== Library ===
The library contains over 20,000 books, both old and new, representing current and past knowledge of exotic and tropical medicine. It also preserves and promotes the École du Pharo archives, including an iconographic collection of over 10,000 photographs illustrating the practice of medicine in tropical environments. In 2013, the historical archives were transferred to the Service historique de la défense (in Toulon).

The collection of books and periodicals, part of the photographic holdings, presented in the form of thematic albums, and the museum holdings were transferred to the Musée du service de santé des armées (Val-de-Grâce, Paris).

=== Publications ===
==== Scientific and medical journal ====
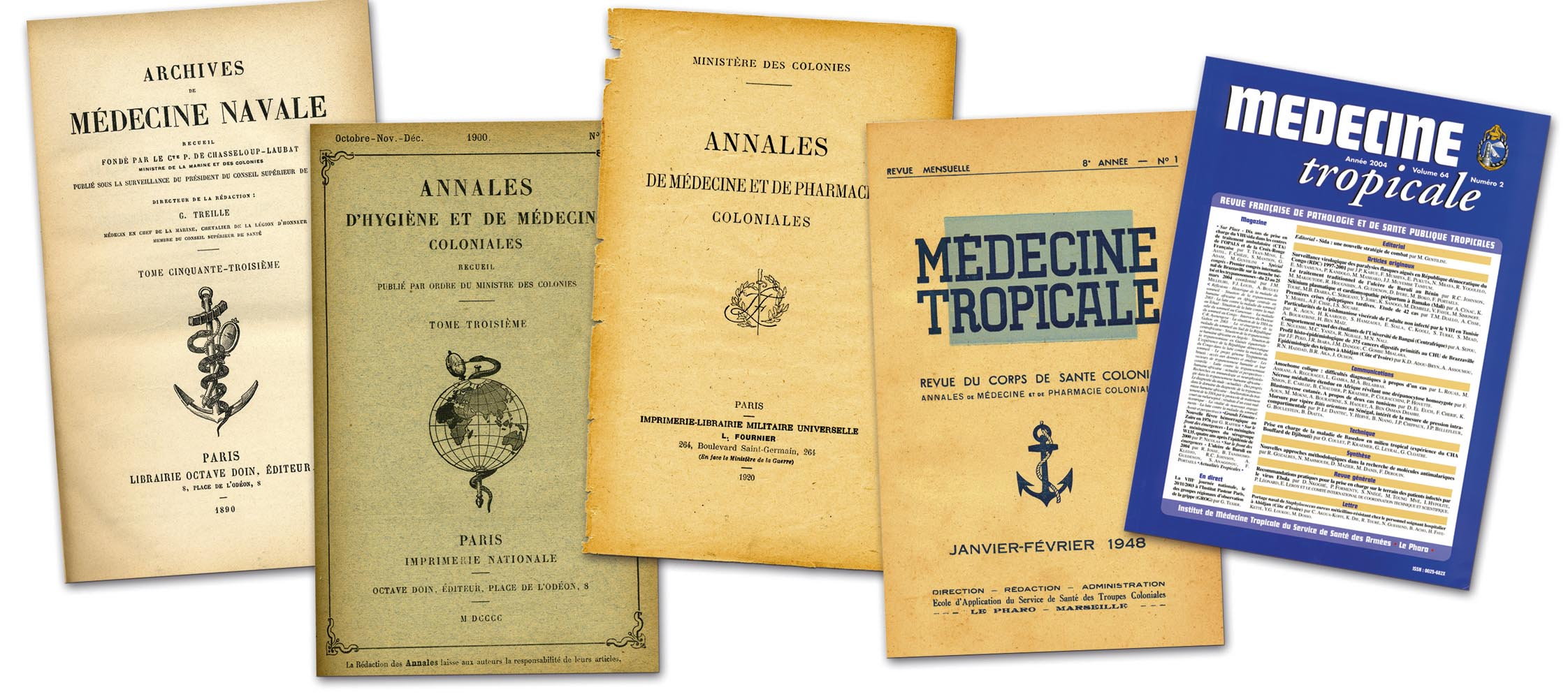
From Archives de médecine navale to Médecine tropicale, genealogy of a medical journal.

In 1941, the École du Pharo created a journal devoted to the fields of tropical and exotic medicine and related disciplines. This journal took the name Médecine tropicale (ISSN 0025-682X) and was published regularly until 2012. Médecine tropicale is the heir to a series of four journals that have succeeded one another since the nineteenth century:

- Archives de Médecine navale from 1864 to 1889;
- Archives de Médecine navale et coloniale from 1890 to 1896;
- Annales d'Hygiène et de Médecine coloniales from 1898 to 1914;

Médecine tropicale was published in 4 quarterly issues, one thematic issue, and a supplement (devoted to the Actualités du Pharo proceedings). In 2012, in anticipation of the École du Pharo's closure, a partnership agreement was signed with Agence Universitaire de la Francophonie, publisher of Cahiers Santé, and John Libbey EUROTEXT, leading to the merger of the two periodicals into Médecine et Santé tropicales (ISSN 2261-3684), which has since been published quarterly.

=== Agrégés du Pharo collection ===
The eminently practical experience of teaching at Le Pharo, and the demand from a growing contingent of trainees in the 1970s and 1980s, led the school's faculty to bring together the most practical, and sometimes least academic, aspects of teaching in a collection of books signed collectively by the "Agrégés du Pharo". These included Thérapeutiques en médecine tropicale in 1980, Techniques élémentaires pour médecin en poste isolé: techniques chirurgicales in 1981, Techniques élémentaires pour médecin en poste isolé: techniques de laboratoires in 1981, and Méthodes statistiques de base pour médecins isolés in 1989.

==== Other publications ====
Collectively or individually, the Pharo's teaching staff continued to publish scientific and historical works, from the Traité de pathologie exotique, clinique et thérapeutique by its first director Albert Clarac, published from 1909 in collaboration with Charles Grall, to Peau noire, dermatologie des peaux génétiquement pigmentées et des maladies exotiques by Professor Jean-Jacques Morand, and Cas cliniques en médecine tropicale by Professors Pierre Aubry and Jean-Étienne Touze, from the school's Chair of Tropical Medicine.

=== Congresses, conferences, seminars ===
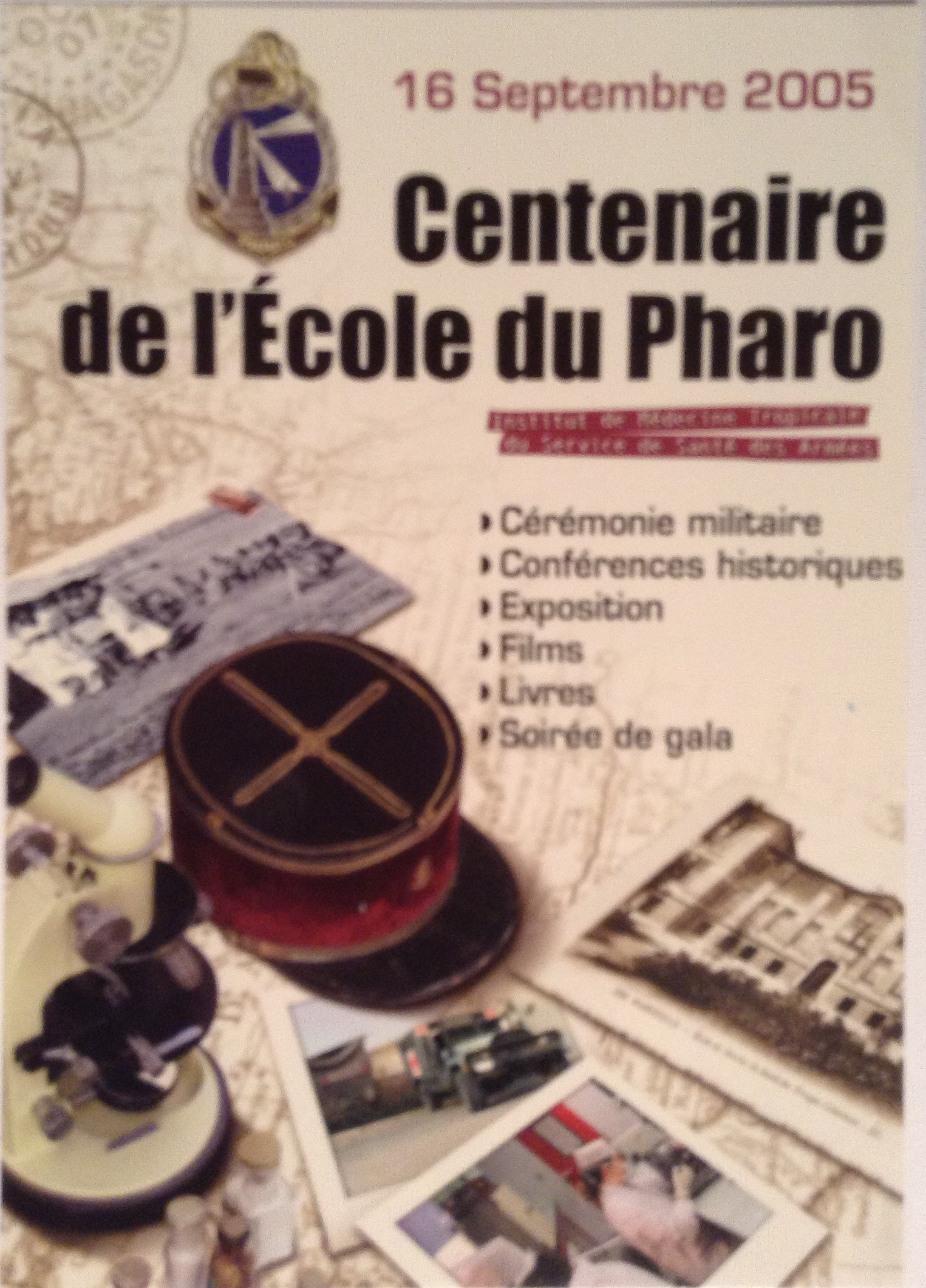
In September 2005, the École du Pharo celebrated its centenary by hosting the World Congress of Tropical Medicine.

Throughout its existence, the school has organized numerous scientific meetings both inside and outside its walls. The first major congress to involve the school was the one devoted to malaria in Algiers in 1930. In addition to its participation, the school was in the path of European delegations on their way to Algeria, all of which stopped off at the Pharo, coming from France, Germany, the Netherlands, Belgium, India, the League of Nations, etc. After the World War II, when it was still known as the École d'application, it was the venue for numerous symposia, seminars and congresses, including the 1952 and 1955 International Training Course for Nutritionists for Sub-Saharan Africa, the 1969 International Meeting on Meningococcal Immuno-Biochemistry, the 1983 International Conference on Cerebrospinal Meningitis in conjunction with the World Health Organization, the information seminar on cholera, the Congress of French-speaking Leprologists, etc.

In partnership with the Hôpital d'Instruction des Armées Laveran, the École du Pharo has been organizing an annual international French-speaking scientific congress on tropical medicine since 1994, known as the Actualités du Pharo, which attracts an average of 300 participants each year. This event took on a special dimension in 2005, the year of the École du Pharo's centenary. On this occasion, Actualités du Pharo was held in conjunction with the congresses of the European Federation of Societies of Tropical Medicine and International Health and the International Federation for Tropical Medicine, bringing together over 1,000 delegates. On September 16, 2005, the École du Pharo celebrated its centenary.

Since France's return to NATO's integrated command, specialists from the École du Pharo have been called upon to take on responsibilities in inter-allied working groups and to organize seminars at the Pharo.

== Le Pharo, the hub of public health services ==
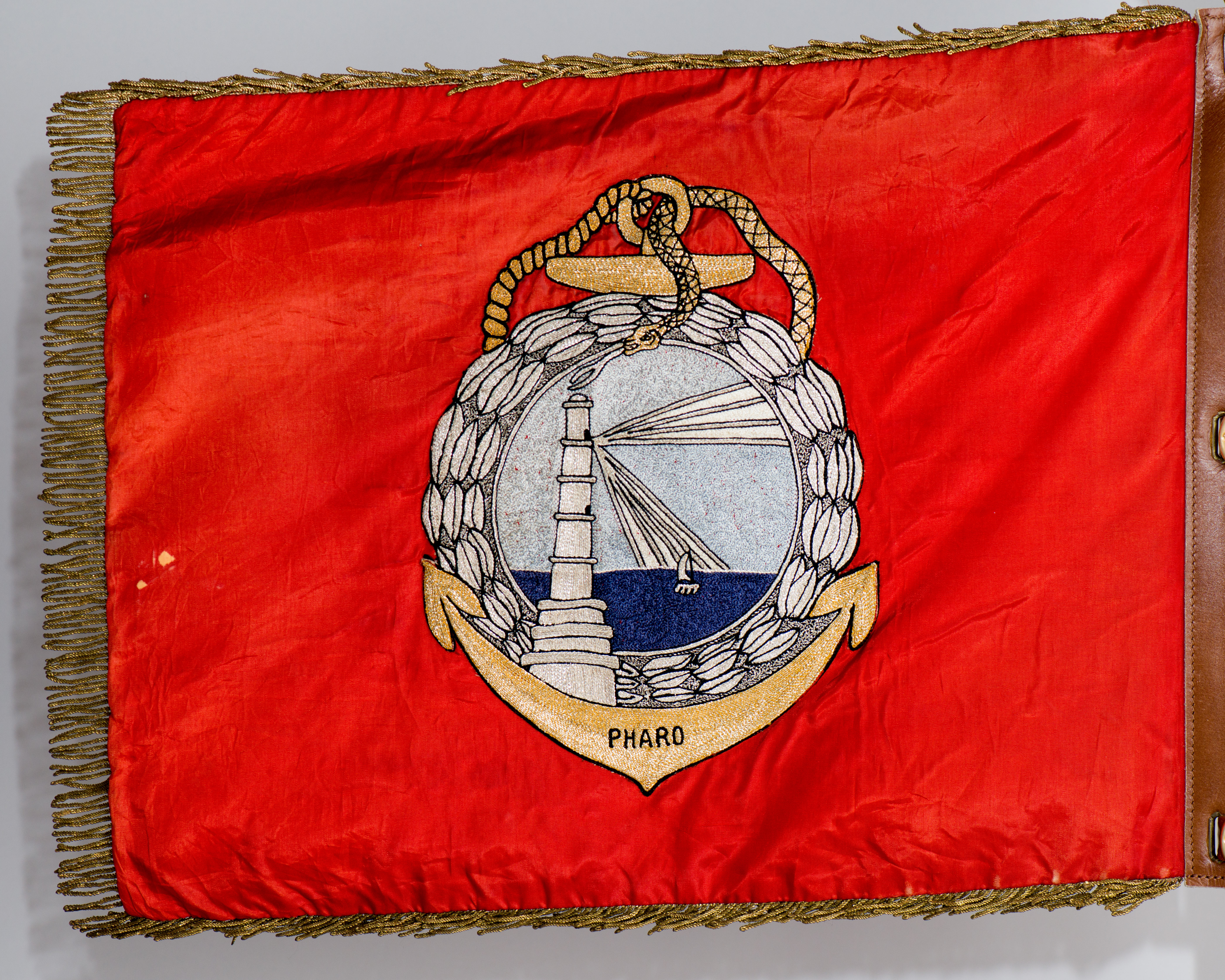
Pennant of the Institut de médecine tropicale du Service de santé des armées, verso.

If the École du service de santé de la marine in Bordeaux was the backbone of the Colonial Health Service, the École du Pharo in Marseille was its brain and heart. For over 50 years, most of the French students from the École du Pharo, both military and medical practitioners, were seconded to civilian jobs outside the armed forces.

These students created and developed a remarkable public health system in most territories. Indeed, for colonizing France, which claimed to be one and indivisible, colonized populations had the same health rights as French citizens in metropolitan France, and should have the same access to care. They were assigned to Assistance Médicale Indigène (AMI), created in 1899 by Alexandre Lasnet in Madagascar, then extended to the entire colonial empire.

In practice, a veritable vertical humanitarian system is being set up, designed to offer populations the same access to healthcare as in France, through a network of healthcare establishments, training schools and research centers in all the colonies. This ambitious project called on the Pharo's military doctors to go far beyond their initial clinical capabilities.

Their activities went beyond the delivery of medical care, and focused on four key areas: training, networking, research and control. This means teaching in schools that must also be managed, and sometimes created, to train local medical and paramedical staff. The oldest of these establishments predate the École du Pharo, such as the medical schools in Pondicherry, Tananarive, Hanoi and Dakar, while others came into being later, such as the medical schools in Phnom Penh and Vientiane, and the nursing schools in Ayos and Bobo-Dioulasso, etc. Everywhere, doctors from the Pharo provide teaching and management staff. The next step was to create a real network of hospital and health training facilities; open overseas Pasteur institutes to develop local research; and control the major tropical endemics.

The AMI, which stemmed from political will and was organized vertically in each colony, was by its very nature made up of fixed structures; it soon came into competition with even more vertical mobile programs dedicated to the control of particular endemic or epidemic diseases, based on the model of trypanosomiasis control invented by Eugène Jamot.

With the decolonization of France, French health action became a matter of "Cooperation". Doctors from the Pharo played an essential role in ensuring the transition, preserving achievements, and training even more local professionals. Given the dangers of endemic diseases, inter-state cooperation was essential, and Pierre Richet and René Labusquière took the opportunity to launch the Organization for Cooperation and Coordination in the Fight against Great Endemic Diseases in West Africa and the Organization for Coordination and Cooperation in the Fight against Great Endemic Diseases in Central Africa.

== Tributes, honours and traditions ==
Throughout its existence, the École du Pharo has received many testimonials of esteem, admiration and recognition, the memory of which is preserved in its hall of honor.

=== Tributes ===
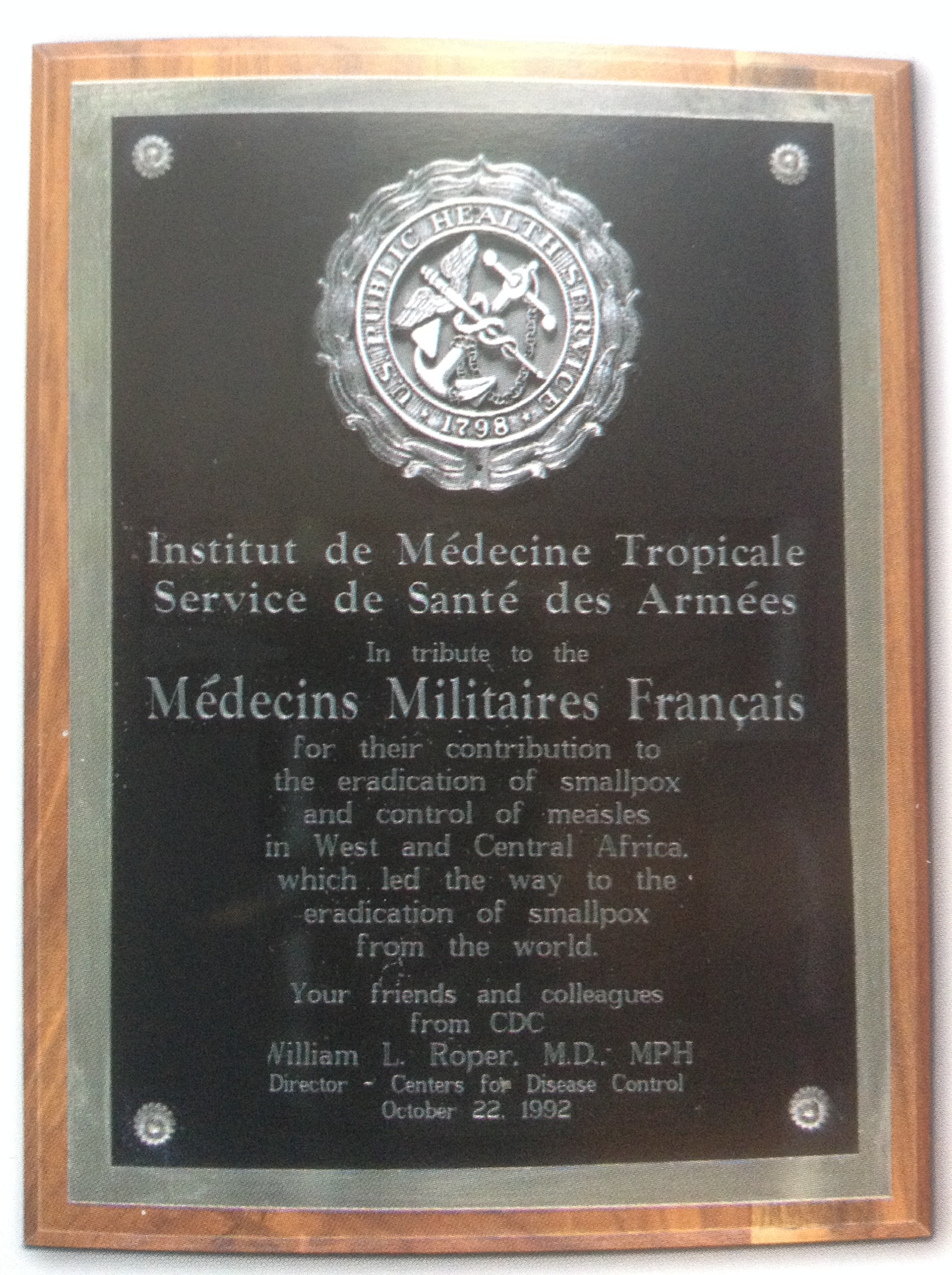
A tribute from the Centers for Disease Controlin Atlanta (USA) to the work of the French military doctors who graduated from the École du Pharo.

As Félix Houphouët-Boigny, President of the Republic of Côte d'Ivoire, said at the inauguration in Marseille on June 29, 1978, of the hospital that bears his name: "I am indefectibly grateful to the Dakar Medical School - of which he was a former student - and to his teachers, who were like you, Gentlemen, whom I see grouped around the Inspector General, Director of the Pharo Institute of Tropical Medicine, officers of this Overseas Health Service, who worked with such courage and dedication in the service of the people of Black Africa. They trained us to assume our responsibilities with rigor and discipline. Their practical teaching has enabled us to assume our responsibilities alone in the face of the most diverse situations. This is why, after so many years, in this city which was the cradle of their training, I would like to pay a special tribute to the young doctors of the Overseas Health Service, associating them with their elders...".

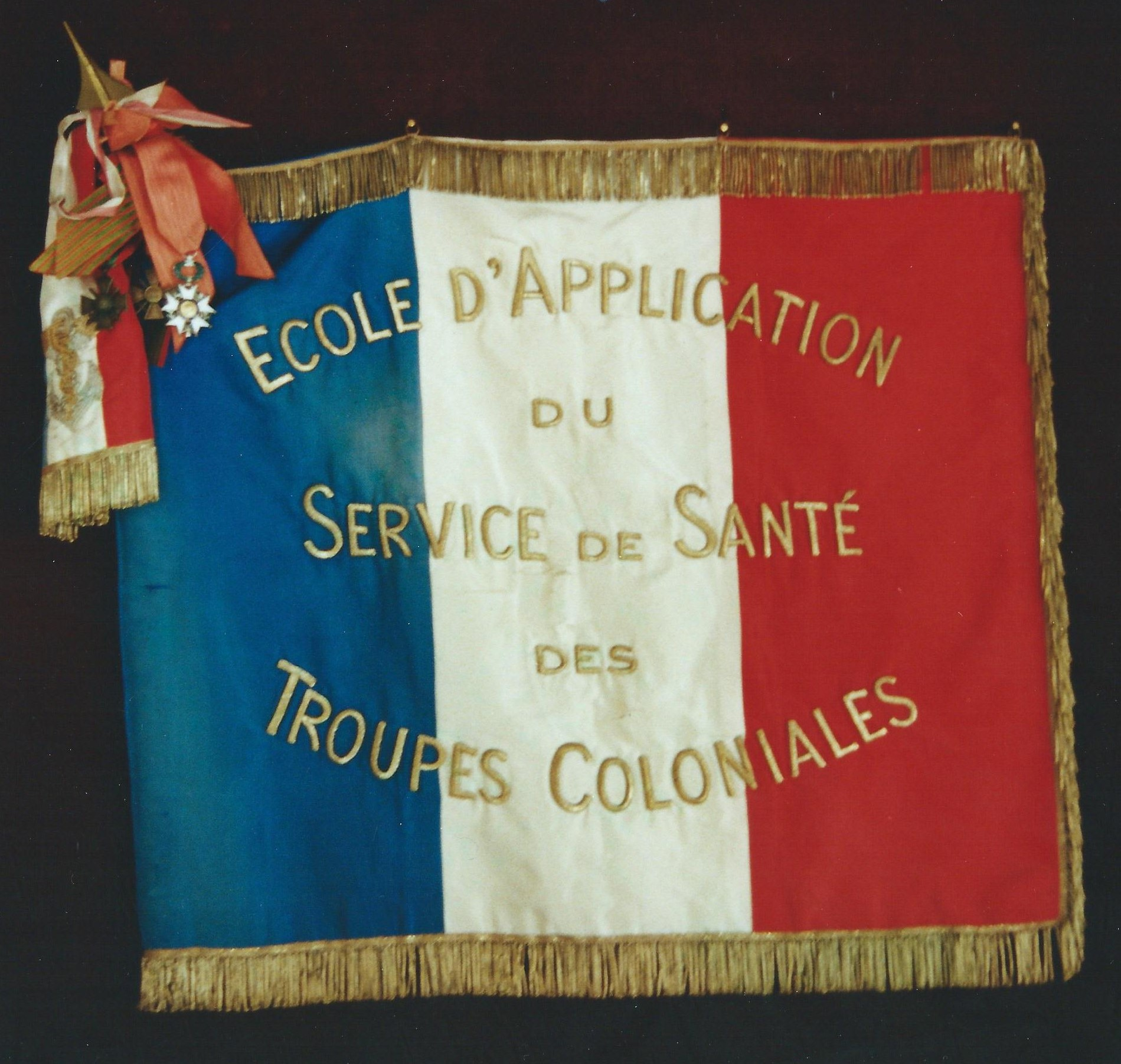
Flag of the École d'application du service de santé des troupes coloniales, with chevalier de la Légion d'honneur and croix de guerre.

In 1985, Professor François Jacob, winner of the Nobel Prize for Medicine and a Companion of the Liberation, commented: "The Bordeaux, Lyon, and Pharo schools have succeeded in creating a new type of doctor: a competent physician, accustomed to working in very harsh conditions, often in the bush, without measuring either his efforts or his pain... I'm not sure that France fully appreciates the importance of the tool it has been given in this way. Many men owe a great deal to these doctors trained at the Bordeaux, Lyon, and Pharo schools."

On October 22, 1992, doctors from the Centers for Disease Control (Atlanta, Georgia, USA) came to pay tribute to the French military doctors who had taken part in the worldwide smallpox eradication program in tropical Africa. On this occasion, Dr. William L Roper, Director of the Centers for Disease Control, presents the school with a commemorative plaque. In his speech, entitled "Tribute to Heroes", Dr. J Donald Millar, former head of the smallpox eradication program in Africa, says: "We have come here today to say officially and personally, to the people of France and to the medical officers 'thank you' for this contribution to the history of humanity. At the same time, we would like to honor all military physicians, and in particular the memory of two exemplary figures, Inspector General Pierre Richet and General René Labusquière. They were the pillars of our strength in Africa.

=== Distinctions ===
The École d'application du service de santé des troupes coloniales was named to the Order of the Army on January 17, 1927, for its teaching, which inspired a cult of science and a spirit of sacrifice in the physicians and pharmacists of the colonial troops, both in the Colonial Empire and during the Great War. The Croix de Guerre 1914-1918 awarded on this occasion was presented on May 23, 1928 by Paul Painlevé, Minister of War. It was cited again on May 16, 1952, for its work with its forty promotions, and in memory of the more than two hundred officers of the Colonial Army Medical Corps who completed their mission by sacrificing their lives. This latest citation was accompanied by the award of the Croix de guerre 1939-1945 avec palme and the Croix de la Légion d'honneur, which were stapled to the school's flag by President René Coty on June 24, 1955.

Chevalier de la Légion d'honneur (decree of May 16, 1952)

Croix de guerre 1914-1918 (decree of January 17, 1927)

Croix de guerre 1939-1945 (decree of May 16, 1952)

=== Memory and Traditions ===
The school's traditional insignia is registered in the Service historique de la défense's general collection of insignia under approval number H341. The round shield, enameled in overseas blue, features the tower of Fort Saint-Jean (Marseille), built in 1644 and located opposite the Parc du Pharo on the other side of Marseille's Old Port. It projects two rays, one horizontal towards the distant tropics, the other illuminating the sea and the silhouette of a sailing ship, evoking the maritime origins of the Colonial Army Medical Corps. The shield is supported by a gold naval anchor, around which the serpent of Aesculapius coils and on which "Pharo" is engraved.

The school's Salle d'Honneur, located on the first floor of the 1932 building, known as the "Salle Jamot", which can also be used as a large meeting room, houses a replica of the school's flag, a retrospective of the fight against the great African endemics, the memories of some of the school's alumni and the tributes received by the school, while its entrance doors are framed by marble plaques commemorating the officers of the Colonial Army Medical Corps who were killed in action and died as victims of duty.

Between 1892 and 1970, 84 doctors, 3 pharmacists, and 2 administrative officers of the Colonial Army Medical Corps (later the Navy Medical Corps) were killed in action. These losses occurred mainly during the First World War (21 deaths), the Second World War (22 deaths), and the Indochinese conflict (29 deaths), while the litany of the dead spans the colonial theaters: Dahomey, Sudan, Ivory Coast, Algeria, Mauritania, Chad and also Korea.

Between 1892 and 1997, 80 doctors, 5 pharmacists, and 4 administrative officers of the Colonial Army Medical Corps (then the Navy Medical Corps) died as victims of duty. These deaths in the line of duty, not as a result of war (but sometimes in peacekeeping operations), were mainly due to diseases contracted in the line of duty, sometimes among their patients (9 times from yellow fever, cholera, plague, typhus, tetanus, trypanosomiasis, typhoid fever) and accidents in the line of duty (shipwreck, drowning); sometimes from crimes and once as a result of an anatomical puncture that infected the operator, while a doctor disappeared in Saint-Pierre in the 1902 eruption of Mount Pelée. (Note: Following the closure of the École du Pharo, the memorial to the officers of the Colonial Medical Corps was moved to the École du Val de Grâce.)

The director's meeting room, located like his office on the first floor of the 1905 building, was named after the first of them, "Salle Clarac".

After the École du Pharo closed, two associations kept the school's memory alive: the Amicale santé navale et d'outre-mer (ASNOM) and the Association des anciens et amis du Pharo (Ceux du Pharo).

=== Former students and known staff ===
The first graduating class at the École du Pharo in 1907 included 42 doctors and 4 pharmacists. Overall, 41 of them came from the 1903 graduating class of the École principale du service de santé de la Marine in Bordeaux, which had 58 students, 71% of a graduating class trained at a naval school but not serving the Navy. The other five trainees were newly-recruited graduate practitioners, all of whom had previously completed their military service. Three-quarters of them come from the French maritime regions. They are between 23 and 30 years old. They come mainly from modest backgrounds (only two sons of officers and two sons of professionals), and 24 have scholarships and 14 have already been orphaned. After leaving school and spending a few months in colonial regiments in mainland France, they left for their first posting in 1908: 24 to Black Africa, 7 to Madagascar, 5 to French Guiana and Indochina, 1 to the West Indies and Comoros, while 2 doctors were placed on leave.

The young doctors cared for the garrison's soldiers and provided the service of native medical assistance. During their first stay, two soldiers died, one in combat, the other from exhaustion. Others already distinguished themselves, and the first Legion of Honor crosses were awarded for heroic deeds or remarkable scientific achievements. The first tour of duty was very trying, and six of them were repatriated on medical grounds. After being posted to a regiment in mainland France for further training, they were sent overseas for a second time, sometimes to more unexpected places (India, China, Ethiopia, etc.) and more responsible posts (hospital, teaching). Once again, tropical sojourns took their toll on the practitioners' health, ten of whom were repatriated before the end of their assignment for health reasons.

The second stay in metropolitan France, from 1913 onwards, would see the graduating class engaged in the First World War. All took part except two, who died of illness before joining. They served an average of 24 months at the front, suffering 8 deaths, wounds and combat gas poisoning, but received 3 Legions of Honor and 30 commendations. By the end of the war, only 33 had left, and a quarter of the class had died.

The next two decades were those of the "workers of the Empire", with a diminished medical workforce. Practitioners from the class of 1907 were spread all over the world, and postings to large cities became frequent. Resignations and lay-offs affected the workforce, but above all, from 1928 onwards, alumni of the Bordeaux school began to retire after 25 years of service, even though they had reached the rank of Commandant. By 1928, a third of the graduating class had died and a second third had retired.

For the 13 practitioners who remained in service, this marked the start of a career of great responsibility within the Colonial Army Medical Corps, which would see two of them reach the rank of General in 1938. The retired members of the class of 1907 were mobilized in September 1939, then demobilized in July 1940, with many joining the Resistance in mainland France or Indochina. By 1945, all members of the class of 1907 had retired, the last of whom died in 1973. In the end, 14 of the 39 doctors died prematurely in the service of France. (Note: This section is taken entirely from Louis-Armand Héraut, «Pharo 1907 : origines et devenir des médecins et pharmaciens de la première promotion», Médecine tropicale and Louis-Armand Héraut, «La "Marseillaise". Vies et morts des médecins et pharmaciens de la première promotion du "Pharo"», Histoire des Sciences médicales)

== See also ==
- French Armed Forces Health Service
- Marseille
- Palais du Pharo
- École du service de santé des armées

== Bibliography ==
- Deroo, Éric (2005). L'École du Pharo: Cent ans de Médecine Outre-Mer 1905-2005, Panazol. Lavauzelle. ISBN 2-7025-1286-0.
- Fabre, Albert (1984). Histoire de la Médecine aux Armées. Paris-Limoges: Charles-Lavauzelle. ISBN 2-7025-0053-6.
- Lefebvre, Pierre (1987). Histoire de la Médecine aux Armées. Paris-Limoges: t. 3, Charles-Lavauzelle. ISBN 2-7025-0185-0.
- Michel, Marc (1985). Le Corps de santé des troupes coloniales. Toulouse: dans Pierre Pluchon, Histoire des médecins et pharmaciens de marine et des colonies Privat. ISBN 2-7089-5322-2.
- Voelkel, Jacques (1980). " Numéro spécial, 75e anniversaire de l'Institut de médecine tropicale du service de santé des armées ". Marseille: Voelkel.
