= French Armed Forces Health Service =

Medical and sanitary support service of the French Armed Forces

- Service de Santé des Armées
- Active: 1708; 318 years ago
- Country: France
- Allegiance: French Armed Forces
- Branch: Support Services
- Size: 15,800 military and civilians
- Patron: Saint-Luc
- Mottos: Your Life is Our Battle ("Votre Vie, Notre Combat")
- Website: https://www.defense.gouv.fr/english/sante/introduction

Commanders
- Current commander: Lieutenant General ("Médecin Général des Armées") Maryline Gygax Généro

Insignia
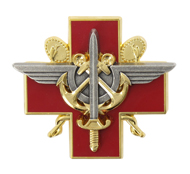
- Identification symbol

The French Armed Forces Health Service (French: Service de Santé des Armées, SSA) is responsible for medical and sanitary support to the French Armed Forces and of all institutions placed under the authority of the French Ministry of Armed Forces. It is a joint service, and its central administration (Direction Centrale du Service de Santé des Armées, DCSSA) is under the direct control of the Chief of the defence staff (chef d'état-major des armées (CEMA)).

Its significant presence on French territory ensures adequate support for French operations in overseas theatres. It provides hospital care services, administers medicals for military personnel, and gives expertise in disease prevention, and medical, dental, pharmaceutical, paramedical and veterinary research and education.

Physicians and chemists receive initial training in Lyon and in Bordeaux until 2011.

Then, they are sent to the Val de Grâce Hospital in Paris for applied training. Dentists and vets are recruited in the civilian labour market. The service also includes administrative and technical officers (OCTASSA), nurses (male and female) and paramedical staff.

== History ==
The health services of the French army and navy were set up by Louis XIV with the 17 January 1708 edict which established royal doctors and surgeons offices.

During The French Revolution (1789–1799) and the Napoleonic Empire (1804–1814), changes were required due to successive mobilisations. Military hospitals were then set up in religious buildings such as the Val-de-Grâce church in Paris.

In 1882, the French Parliament gave the military health services a degree of independence. Subsequently, eight hospitals, two schools (in Lyon and Bordeaux), as well as research and sanitary supply agencies were gradually acquired.

In 1890, the Military Medical Schools at Bordeaux and Lyon opened. Bordeaux educated for the Navy and colonial troops, while Lyon educated for the Army and the new Air Force.

In 1962, a central management of the military health services was established. In 1968, all of the military health services (Navy, Air Force, Army, Gendarmerie, etc.) merged to form a single joint defence health system.

On July 2, 2011, the Military School of Medicine (ESA) was established as part of a rationalisation of the armed forces, meaning the closure of Bordeaux. This makes Lyon the only school of military institution providing the first six years of medical and pharmacist training in the armed forces. The ESA inherits the traditions of both schools.

Notable characters in the history of the French military health services include:

- Baron Pierre-François Percy (1754–1825), surgeon-in-chief during the Revolution and the Empire;
- Dominique Jean Larrey (1766–1842), father of emergency medicine;
- Louis Jacques Bégin (1793–1859), surgeon of the First Empire and to the second president of the Academy of Medicine in 1847;
- Robert Picqué (1877–1927), pioneer of medical transport by air;
- Charles Louis Alphonse Laveran (1845–1922), won the Nobel Prize for medicine in 1907 for discovering that malaria is caused by a protozoan;
- Henri Laborit (1914–1995), surgeon, discoverer of neuroleptics, neurobiologist ... ;
- Valérie André, a pioneer in medical evacuation by helicopter during the Indochina War.

== Missions ==
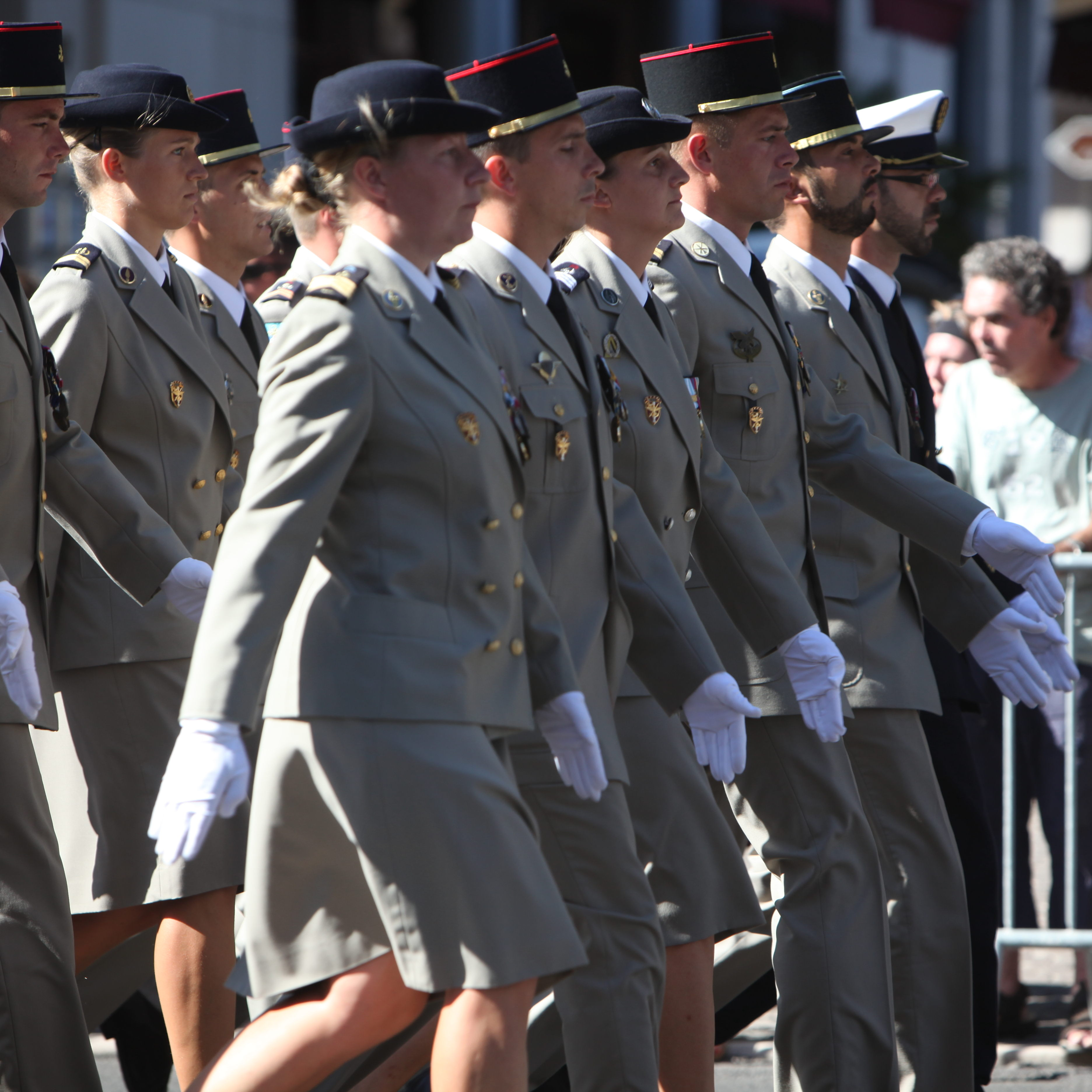
Members of the École du personnel paramédical des armées during the Bastille Day parade in Toulon, 2011

=== Health support to the armed forces ===
The primary mission of the SSA is to provide medical support to armed forces personnel. It is responsible for ensuring their suitability for operations, at their application, throughout their careers, and beyond, assessing their physical and mental health. (selection, fitness, immunizations, care, protection, health education etc.).

On operations, the SSA support the sick and wounded from outset until full recovery. It is organised into four levels:

- Emergency actions and resuscitation performed by the medical post in combat units,
- Surgical treatment necessary for survival and prevention of complications in field hospitals,
- Treatment of the wounded on the scene in a medical-surgical hospital
- Evacuation for further treatment to the Army Teaching Hospital in France

=== Medical support to overseas military operations ===
The French Defence Health Services is committed to providing optimal emergency and routine health care to the injured and ill military patients overseas. Therefore, it sets up medical and surgical facilities as close to the operations as possible. Furthermore, it proceeds to early repatriation of injured soldiers to military hospitals in France, with the objective of admitting the patient to a French Military Teaching Hospital within 24 hours following the injury, when necessary.

=== Humanitarian involvement ===
The humanitarian side of the French Defence Health Services focuses on post-disaster emergency relief and medical support to populations stricken by conflicts.

Moreover, during out-of-area operations, though prioritizing medical support to its own forces, it provides medical assistance to local populations.

== Specific ranks of the French Defence Health Service ==
Doctors with clinical duties hold the following ranks:

- Interne ("Resident", equivalent to First lieutenant). A rank created in 2005.
- Médecin ("Medical Officer", equivalent to captain)
- Médecin principal ("Lead Medical Officer", equivalent to major)
- Médecin en chef ("Medical officer-in-Chief", equivalent to lieutenant colonel or colonel according to seniority)
- Médecin chef des services de classe normale ("Chief Medical Officer", equivalent to Brigadier General)
- Médecin chef des services hors classe ("Senior Chief Medical Officer", equivalent to Major General)

General officers with management and inspecting duties have specific ranks:

- Médecin général (equivalent to Brigadier General)
- Médecin général Inspecteur (equivalent to a Major General)

The Director of the French Defence Health Service and the Inspector General of the Defence Health Services both have the rank of "Médecin général des Armées" (equivalent to Lieutenant General).

== Other English Names ==
- French Military Health Services
- French Armed Forces Health Services
- French Defense Health Services

== See also ==
- École du Pharo
