= Simone Courvoisier =

French experimental pharmacologist

Simone Courvoisier was a French experimental pharmacologist who, while the head of pharmacology at Rhône-Poulenc in the 1950s, investigated the use of the antipsychotic medication chlorpromazine. She discovered that the compound promazine had sedating properties despite not being an antihistamine like its precursor promethazine, and then extensively analyzed the properties of its descendant drug chlorpromazine.
