= Florence Delay =

French writer and actress (1941–2025)

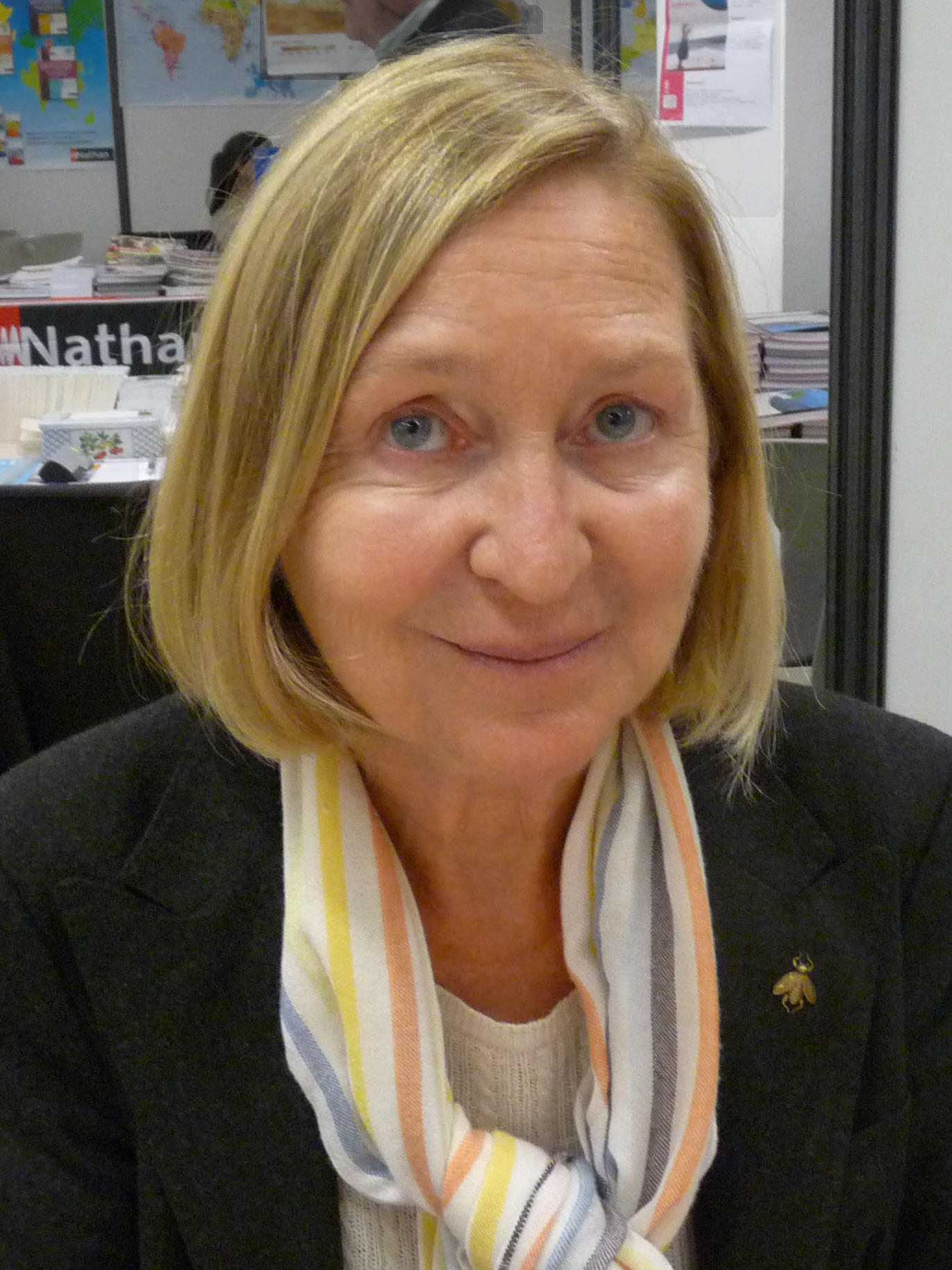
- Delay in 2009
- Born: 19 March 1941; Paris, France
- Died: 1 July 2025 (aged 84); Paris, France
- Education: Lycée Jean de La Fontaine; Faculté des lettres de Paris; University of Paris
- Occupations: Actress; writer; educator
- Years active: 1960–2025
- Spouse: Maurice Bernart (m. 2011; died 2025)
- Father: Jean Delay
- Relatives: Claude Delay (sister)

Florence Delay (French pronunciation: [flɔʁɑ̃s dəlɛ]; 19 March 1941 – 1 July 2025) was a French writer and actress. She was a member of the Académie française from 2000. Delay notably wrote novels, essays and plays (in collaboration with Jacques Roubaud) and translated texts from Spanish.

Delay was also known for portraying Joan of Arc in the 1962 Robert Bresson film The Trial of Joan of Arc.

== Early life and education ==
Florence Delay wa born on 19 March 1941 the second daughter of Marie-Madeleine Carrez and Jean Delay, psychiatrist and writer. She was the sister of Claude Delay, writer and psychoanalyst.

She attended the Lycée Jean de La Fontaine and then studied Spanish at Faculté des lettres de Paris and at the Sorbonne. After obtaining her Spanish degree, she taught general and comparative literature at the Université Sorbonne Nouvelle.

== Career ==
In 1962, aged 20, she played the title role of Joan of Arc in Procès de Jeanne d'Arc (The Trial of Joan of Arc) by Robert Bresson.

After studying at the École du Vieux-Colombier, she was then a trainee stage manager at the Festival d'Avignon, assistant to Raymond Rouleau at the Théâtre du Gymnase, and to Georges Wilson at the Théâtre national populaire (TNP). She translated La Celestina by Fernando de Rojas, staged by Antoine Vitez in 1989; and then, in another version, by Christian Schiaretti, at the TNP in 2011, as well as works from the Spanish Golden Age (Calderón de la Barca, Lope de Vega).

In 1973, she published her first novel, Minuit sur les jeux. Starting with Petites Formes en prose après Edison (1987), she alternated between novels, essays and other writings.

With Jacques Roubaud of the Oulipo, she compiled Graal Théâtre, a series of ten plays about the Arthurian legend, from 1977 to 2005.

Delay was a juror for the Prix Femina (1978‍–‍1982), a member of the reading committee of Éditions Gallimard (1979‍–‍1987), a member of the editorial board of the journal Critique (1978‍–‍1995), a drama columnist for La Nouvelle Revue française (1978‍–‍1985), and a member of the reading committee of the Comédie-Française (2002‍–‍2006).

She was an actress, narrator or writer in movies by Chris Marker, Hugo Santiago, Benoît Jacquot, Emilio Maillé, and Michel Deville.

== Honours and awards ==
Delay was awarded the Prix Femina in 1983 for her novel Riche et légère, the Prix Francois-Mauriac de la région Aquitaine in 1990 for Etxemendi, the Grand Prix du Roman de la Ville de Paris in 1999 and the Prix de l'Essai de l'Académie française for Dit Nerval.

On 14 December 2000, Delay was elected as a member of the Académie française.

== Personal life and death ==
Delay was married to the film producer Maurice Bernart. She died in Paris on 1 July 2025, at the age of 84.

== Bibliography ==
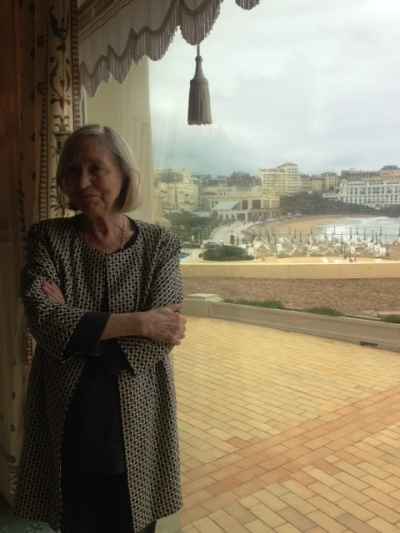
Florence Delay in Biarritz in 2021

- Minuit sur les jeux (1973)
- Le aïe aïe de la corne de brume (1975)
- Graal théâtre (in coll. with Jacques Roubaud, 1977–1981)
- L'Insuccès de la fête (1980)
- Riche et légère (1983)
- Acte de la Passion, in Théâtre espagnol du XVI^{e} siècle (1983)
- Marco Polo, le nouveau livre des merveilles, (in coll. with Jean Marie Adiaffi, Sony Labou Tansi, Jacques Savoie, Louis Caron, Abdelaziz Kacem, Jacques Lacarrière, Bertrand Visage – 1985)
- Course d'amour pendant le deuil (1986)
- L'Éclypse de la balle, d'Arnaldo Calveyra (1987)
- Il me semble, Mesdames ou Les Dames de Fontainebleau (1987)
- Petites formes en prose après Edison (1987)
- "La sortie au jour" in Le Livre sacré de l'ancienne Égypte (1987)
- Le divin Narcisse, et autres textes, de Sor Juana Inès de la Cruz, (in coll. with Frédéric Magne and Jacques Roubaud, 1987)
- La Décadence de l'analphabétisme, de José Bergamín (1988)
- Partition rouge. Poèmes et chants des Indiens d'Amérique du Nord, (in coll. with Jacques Roubaud, 1988)
- La Célestine (version courte), de Fernando de Rojas (1989)
- La Solitude sonore du toreo, de José Bergamín (1989)
- L'Hexaméron (in coll. with Michel Chaillou, Michel Deguy, Natacha Michel, Denis Roche, Jacques Roubaud, 1990)
- Etxemendi (1990)
- Semaines de Suzanne (in coll. with Patrick Deville, Jean Echenoz, Sonja Greenlee, Harry Mathew, Mark Polizzotti, Olivier Rolin, 1991)
- Les Moitiés, de Ramón Gómez de la Serna, (in coll. with Pierre Lartigue, 1991)
- Catalina, enquête (1994)
- Œillet rouge sur le sable (1994)
- La Fin des temps ordinaires (1996)
- La Séduction brève (1997)
- Six poèmes galiciens, de Federico García Lorca (1998)
- L'Homme du Luxembourg, d'Arnaldo Calveyra (1998)
- Beauténébreux, de José Bergamín (1999)
- Dit Nerval, essai (1999)
- Michée, Aggée, Zacharie, Malachie, (with Maurice Roger and Arnaud Sérandour, 2001)
- Le Grand Théâtre du monde suivi de Procès en séparation de l'Âme et du Corps, de Pedro Calderón de la Basca (2004)
- Mon Espagne. Or et Ciel, Hermann (2008)

== Filmography ==
- The Trial of Joan of Arc (1962)
- Le Jouet criminel (1969, short)
- Collections privées (1979, segment "Kusa-Meikyu", voice)
- Écoute voir... (1979)
- Les Années Arruza... (1996)
