= Sainte-Anne Hospital Center =

Sainte-Anne Hospital Centre
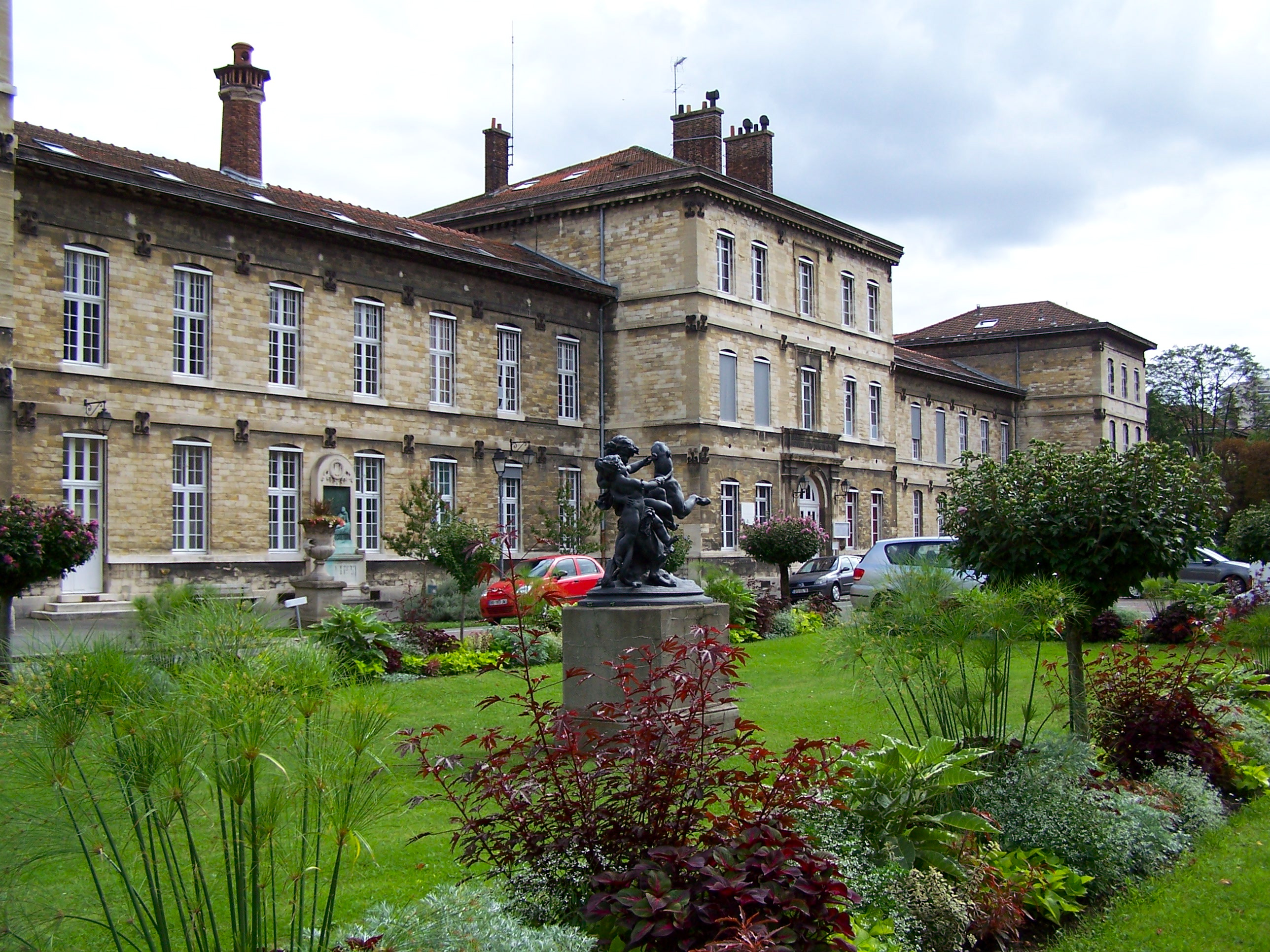
- The Magnan Pavilion, main wing of the hospital

Geography
- Location: 14th arrondissement of Paris, France
- Coordinates: 48°49′42″N 02°20′20″E

History
- Founded: 1651

Links
- Website: www.ghu-paris.fr/fr

The Sainte-Anne Hospital Center (French: Centre hospitalier Sainte-Anne) is a hospital located in the 14th arrondissement of Paris, specializing in psychiatry, neurology, neurosurgery, neuroimaging and addiction. With its creation dating to 1651, the organization remains, along with the Esquirol Hospital in Saint-Maurice, the symbol of psychiatric asylums in France.

== History ==
=== Creation of the Sainte-Anne Hospital Center ===
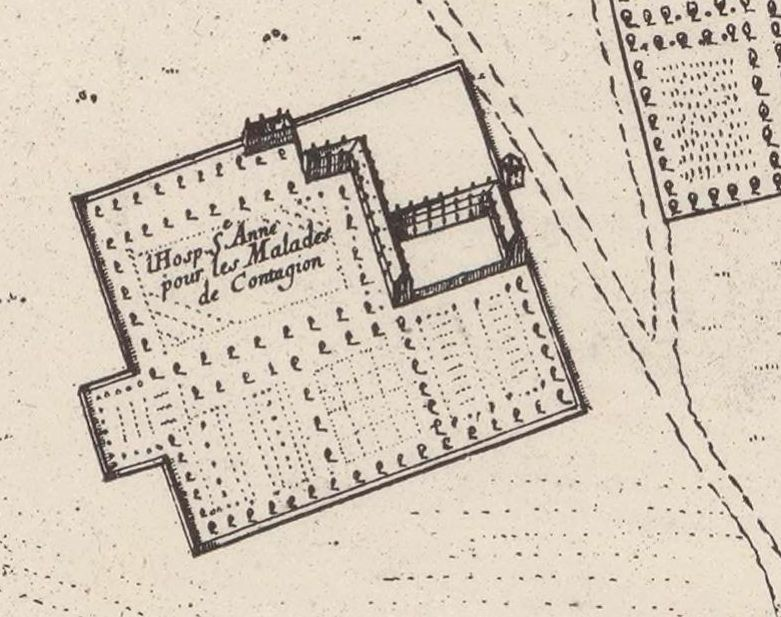
The hospital on the plan of Jouvin de Rochefort, in 1672

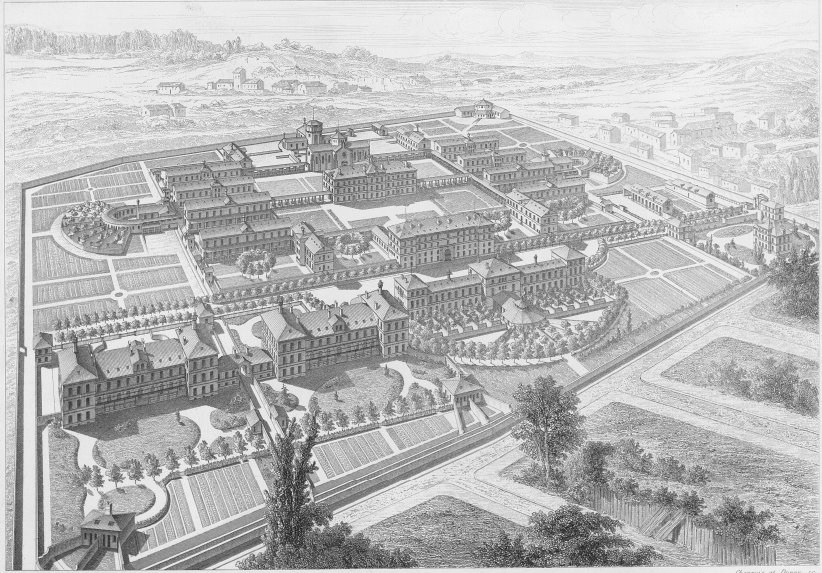
The asylum in 1877

The letters patent of the king confirming the transfer of the services from the hospital of the health of the faubourg Saint-Marcel to the Sainte-Anne hospital date to May 1651. By the contract of 7 July 1651, between the governors of the Hôtel-Dieu and the founders of power of the Queen Regent Anne of Austria, the Hôtel-Dieu gave up the buildings and the grounds of the House of Health, the queen giving in exchange the 21 arpents (about 26.5 acres) of land chosen to establish the new hospital, which was to take the name of the patron saint of the mother of Louis XIV, Saint Anne. This little-used establishment was transformed into a farm where the insane patients from the relatively nearby Bicêtre Hospice came to work. The Sainte-Anne Farm was the site of important activity for several years because of the work and the initiatives of the patients. In 1772, following a major fire at the Hôtel-Dieu (which had previously burned down in 1737 and 1742), a redevelopment of four major hospitals was planned in Paris (the Saint-Louis Hospital, the Sainte-Anne Hospital, the Hospitallers of Roquette and the Royal Abbey of Sainte-Périne de Chaillot).

In 1788, following a decree of the Council of State, the architect Bernard Poyet became responsible for completely rebuilding the hospital.

In 1863, Napoleon III decided to create a psychiatric hospital in Paris on the site of the Sainte-Anne Farm. It was referred to as a "clinical asylum" because it was intended to be a place of mental illness treatment, research, and teaching. Georges-Eugène Haussmann, prefect of the Seine Department, was in charge of this operation. Previously prefect of the Yonne Department, he had some years prior built, in collaboration with Dr. Girard de Cailleux (whom he had brought to Paris), the departmental asylum of the Yonne, which served as a model for that of Paris.

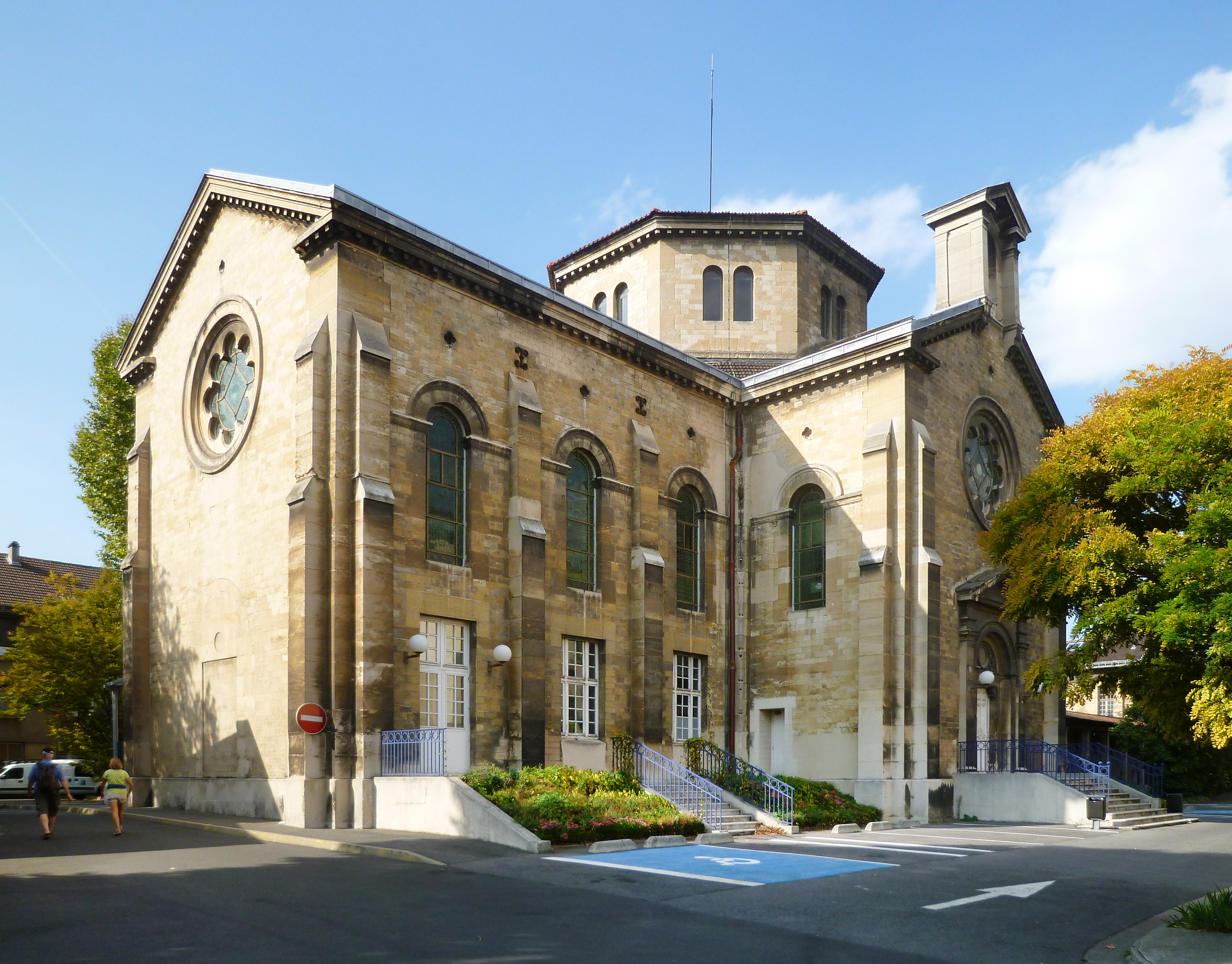
The Sainte-Anne Chapel, built by Charles-Auguste Questel in 1869

The "asylum" was inaugurated on January 1, 1867 and the first patient was admitted on May 1, 1867. For many years Sainte-Anne fulfilled its role of protection of mental patients, using the weakly therapeutic treatment means of the time. The asylum saw the development of important and profound medical research, which was often masked by the prejudices that clashed within the walls of the establishment.

The asylum endowed itself with a dentistry department in 1892, outpatient consultations—made free of charge to reduce hospitalizations—and a central surgery pavilion for the surgical treatment of patients from asylums in the Seine Department. This important building, which was highly modern at the time, had separate septic and aseptic rooms, hospital rooms, an obstetric section, and radiology, microphotography, and biology laboratories.

In 1922, Édouard Toulouse created the centre of mental prophylaxis, the first voluntary service, that is to say, in which the patients were not interned under the law of June 30, 1838. In 1941 one of the first electroencephalographic laboratories in France was installed. The department of pediatric bio-psychopathology, the function of which was to put at the disposal of maladjusted children and their families an original clinical and therapeutic approach that would bring together dual emotional and cognitive aspects, was created in 1947.

=== Modern era ===
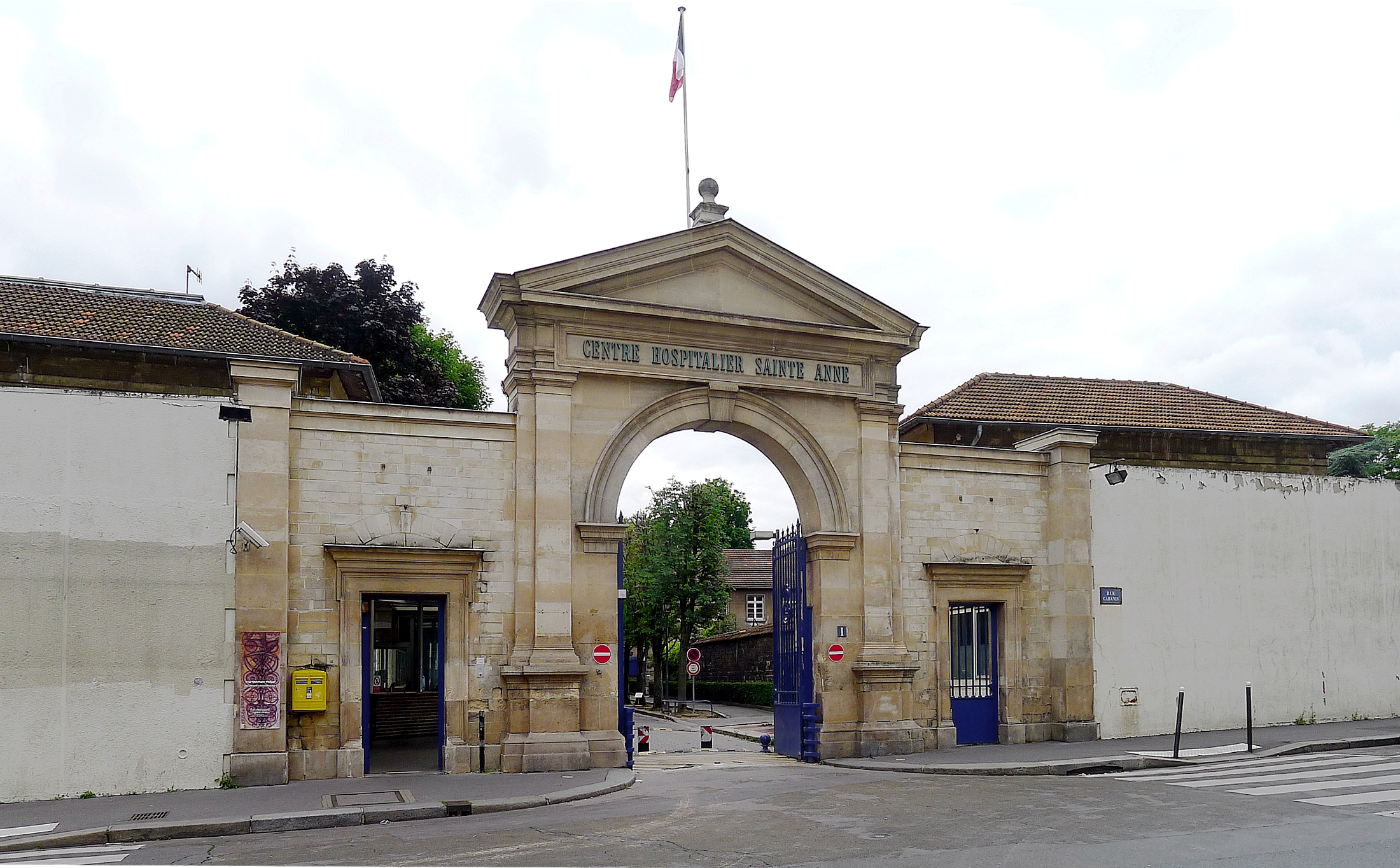
Gate No. 1, Rue Cabanis

In 1952, Sainte-Anne was the site of the discovery by Jean Delay and his assistant Pierre Deniker of the properties of the first neuroleptic, 4560 RP (Largactil). Since the beginning of the 20th century, the hospital has also been the site of the development of a psychiatry teaching respect for the various components of this discipline. Since the 1960s, the hospital has had a psychiatric orientation and reception center (centre psychiatrique d'orientation et d'accueil, CPOA), a psychiatric emergency service open 24 hours a day and all year round.

The hospital has seven sections for adult psychiatry and two sections for child and adolescent psychiatry, which correspond to geographical areas from which the patients come. Sainte-Anne welcomes patients from the 5th, 6th, 14th, 15th, and 16th arrondissements of Paris in various pavilions named after famous doctors (Benjamin Ball, Pierre Janet, Raymond Garcin, and Piera Aulagnier. The hospital also has the university hospital service (SHU), the clinic for mental illness clinic and the brain (CMME), the regional medical-psychological service (SMPR), a service specializing in the study of addiction called the center for care, support, and prevention in addictology (CSAPA), and a support service for mental health and social exclusion (SMES). Sainte-Anne does not have a unit for difficult patients (UMD). In addition, the hospital has developed agreements with various emergency departments, including hospitals Ambroise Paré, Cochin and HEGP (AP-HP), as well as Saint Joseph Hospital. A cafeteria was built in the 1980s, as well as a centre of life. Hachette operates this cafeteria through its Relais H brand. A users' house is installed next to this cafeteria; it is a place of information for patients and their relatives.

The Sainte-Anne Hospital Center is equipped with an audiovisual service, called "broadcast", that since 1995 produces and archives certain documents concerning the medical and institutional activity of the hospital. Audiovisual archives are accessible to the media by special request.

In recent years, Sainte-Anne Hospital has undergone many changes to become a reference center in psychiatry and neuroscience.

The methods of care in psychiatry have evolved considerably over the last twenty years:

- Deployment of out-of-hospital and ambulatory facilities, as part of a voluntary sector policy
- Strong reduction in the capacity of beds in complete hospitalization
- Implementation of conventions and networks, particularly with Assistance Publique - Hôpitaux de Paris
- Active participation in Emergency Reception Services (SAU)
- Development of important research works in collaboration with INSERM

The neurology department was set up in 1974, and neuroradiology became, at Sainte-Anne Hospital, a state-of-the-art discipline, with innovative equipment, such as a CT scanner and magnetic resonance imaging, which enabled therapeutic radiology.

The Raymond-Garcin Center, an integral part of the establishment, brings together the different disciplines of somatic medicine: neurology, with a Neurovascular Unit, Neurosurgery, Neuroradiology, Neurophysiology, Neuro-anatomopathology, Anesthesia-Resuscitation, Stomatology, Physical Medicine and Rehabilitation.

=== Education, work, and publications ===
The hospital welcomes medical students from the Paris Descartes Faculty of Medicine.

The hospital has its own magazine, L'Encephale, which organizes an annual congress and has a foundation, the Pierre Deniker Foundation. The medical staff also take part in the symposia of the Association of the friends of Pierre Deniker for the teaching of psychiatry ("Journée Pierre Deniker" and "Journée de l'interne").

In the university hospital service, Professor Marie-Odile Krebs co-directs the Joint Research Unit 894 Inserm University Paris Descartes "Center for Psychiatry and Neuroscience".

== Personalities related to the hospital ==
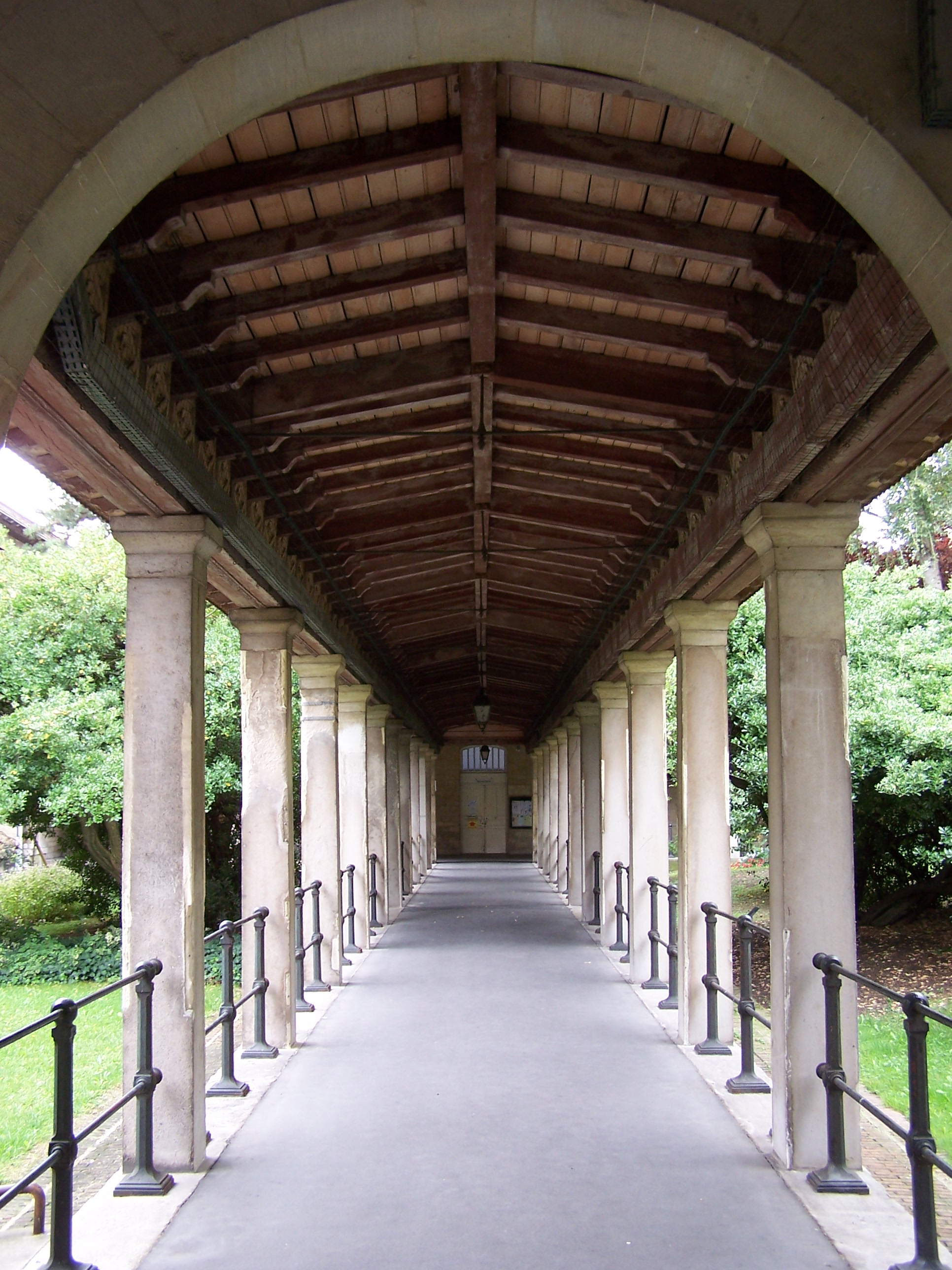
One of the many galleries of the hospital, here the Pirandello Gallery

=== Famous doctors ===
- Benjamin Ball
- Valentin Magnan
- Jacques Lacan, intern (1927–28) and seminars
- Georges Daumezon
- Jean Talairach
- Jean Delay
- Pierre Deniker
- Sonn Mam
- Alexandre Lamache
- Henri Lôo
- Jean-Pierre Olié
- Christophe André
- Auguste Marie, founder of family colony in Dun-sur-Auron

=== Famous patients ===
- The writer and poet Antonin Artaud in Sainte-Anne in 1937-38; transferred to Ville-Evrard Hospital in 1939 and then to Rodez
- The philosopher Louis Althusser, in 1980
- Marina Petrella
- Loana Petrucciani
- Poet Paul Celan, February 13 to October 17, 1967 - Department of Professor J. Delay
- Unica Zürn, poet and surrealist designer, author of Der Mann im Jasmin (The Man in Jasmine) and Dunkler Frühling (Dark Spring), last companion of Hans Bellmer
- Beauford Delaney, African-American abstract expressionist painter, 1975 until his death in 1979.

== Psychiatric infirmary of the Police Prefecture ==
This infirmary, which is administered by the Paris Police Prefecture, admits persons who are subject to provisional measures pending an order of involuntary commitment.

According to the Council of State in its opinion No. 367355 of March 19, 2002: "The land underlying the psychiatric infirmary of the police department belongs to the Sainte-Anne psychiatric hospital. The Council of State has not been able to take a position on the ownership (situation patrimoniale) of the building erected on the parcel located at No. 3 rue Cabanis."

== Garden ==
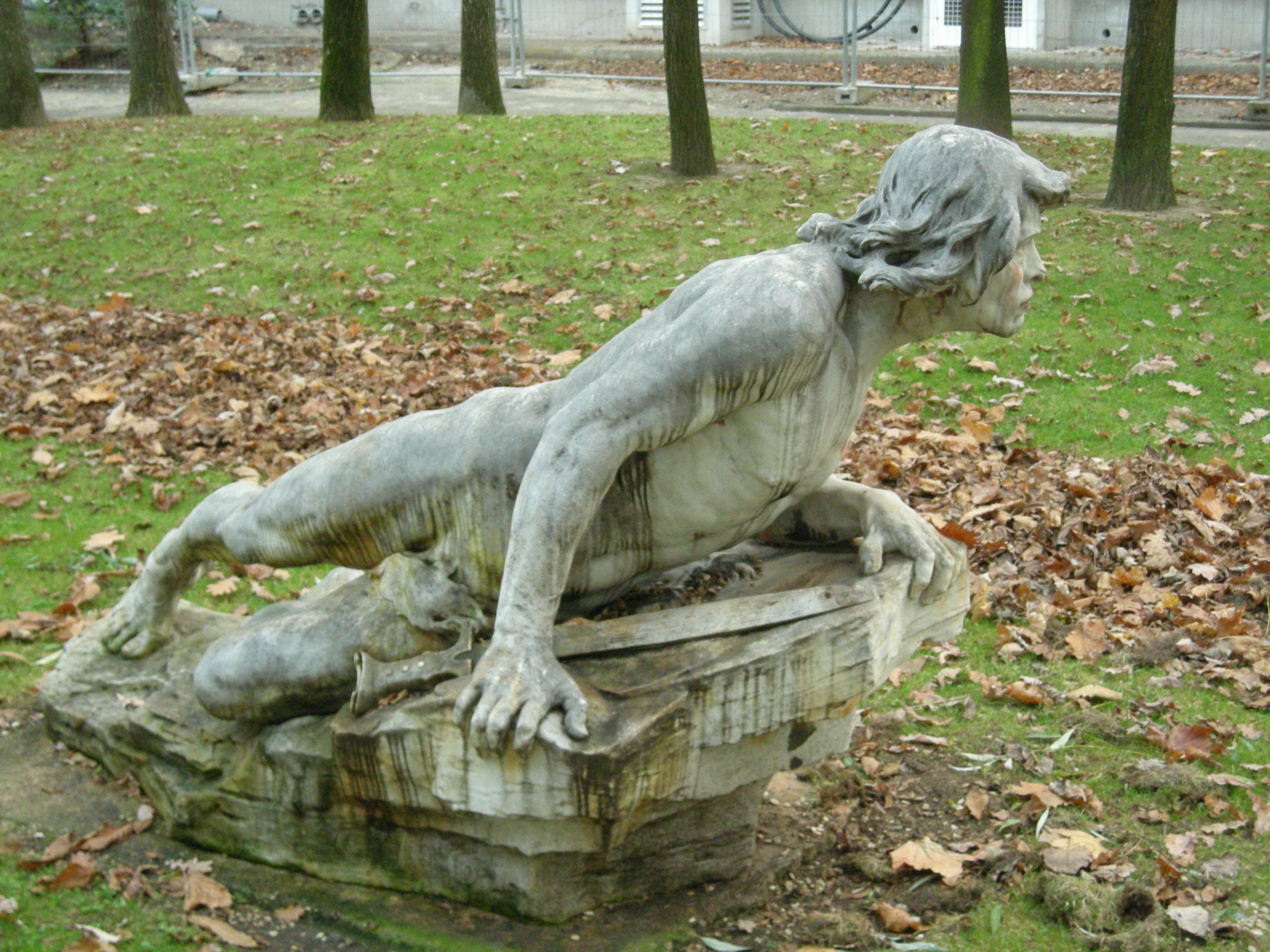
Le Guet, a statue by Victorien Tournier (1900), was placed in the garden of the Sainte-Anne Hospital in Paris in 1947.

The garden has a number of statues installed in 1947 with Victorien Tournier's Le Guet, Émile Perrault-Harry's Otarie, and a reclining lion by an unknown sculptor.

== Access ==
The Sainte-Anne Hospital Center is served by the Paris Métro line at the Glacière station and nearby by the RATP 21 and 62 bus lines.

== See also ==
- Le Plancher de Jeannot exposé 7 rue Cabanis
