= Ricardo Aronovich =

Argentine cinematographer

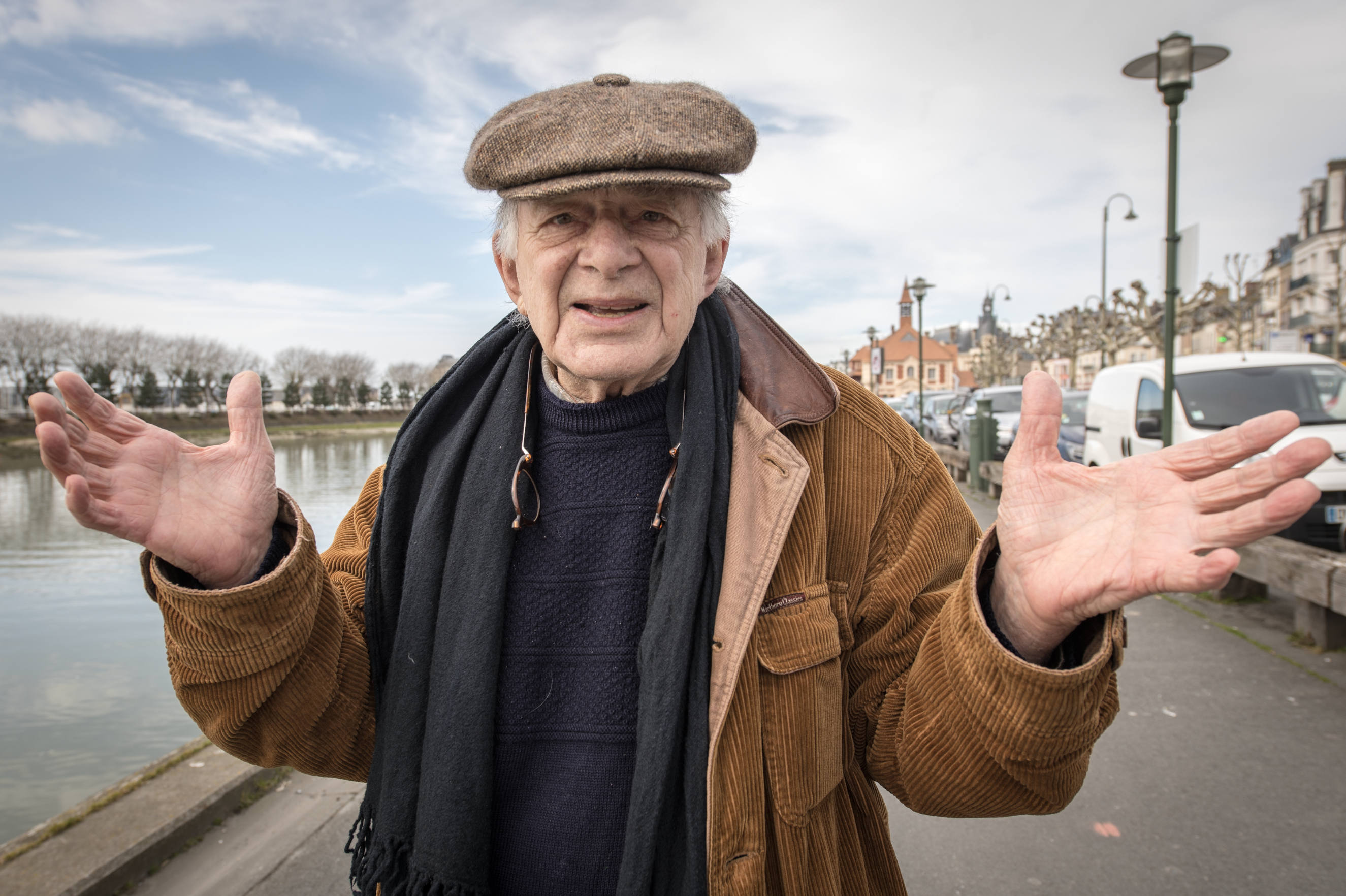
- Photo by Eduardo Montes-Bradley
- Born: January 3, 1930 (age 96); Buenos Aires, Argentina
- Occupations: Filmmaker, Cinematographer
- Years active: 1950s to present
- Spouse: Elena

Ricardo Aronovich (born January 3, 1930, in Buenos Aires) is an Argentinian cinematographer known for his work for directors such as Hugo Santiago, Costa-Gavras, Ettore Scola and Raúl Ruiz.

== Filmography ==
- The Guns (1964)
- The Obsessed of Catule (1965)
- Orden de matar (1965)
- Psique y sexo (1965)
- As Cariocas (1966)
- A Garota de Ipanema (1967)
- O Homem Que Comprou o Mundo (1968)
- Invasión (1969)
- Murmur of the Heart (1971)
- Dear Louise (1972)
- Plot (1972)
- The Dominici Affair (1973)
- Les autres (1974)
- That Most Important Thing: Love (1975)
- Lumiere (1976)
- Providence (1977)
- The Recourse to the Method (1978)
- Flesh Color (1978)
- Womanlight (1979)
- Écoute voir (1979)
- Christmas Evil (1980)
- Chanel Solitaire (1981)
- Missing (1982)
- Hanna K. (1983)
- Le Bal (1983)
- Les Longs Manteaux (1986)
- The Family (1987)
- I Never Been in Vienna (1989)
- The Man Inside (1990)
- Time Regained (1999)
- Stranded (2001)
- Klimt (2006)
- Moscow Zero (2006)
- A Closed Book (2010)

== Awards ==
- 1965 Candango Trophy for Best Cinematography for Vereda de Salvação
- 1978 César Award for Best Cinematography nominated for Providence
- 1984 César Award for Best Cinematography nominated for Le Bal
- 1997 Best Cinematography at the Havana Film Festival for El Impostor
- 2001 Career Award at the ABC Cinematography Award
- 2012 Golden Unicorn for Career Achievement at the Amiens International Film Festival
