= Maurice Bernart =

French independent film producer and actor (1932–2025)

- Born: 5 September 1932; Lille, France
- Died: 12 February 2025 (aged 92)
- Occupation(s): Film producer, actor
- Spouse: Florence Delay (m. 2011)

Maurice Bernart (5 September 1932 – 12 February 2025) was a French independent film producer and actor.

== Life and career ==
Bernart was born on 5 September 1932. During World War II, his Jewish family hid in Montauban in a villa owned by Philippe Labro's parents. Throughout his career, he was decorated as an Officer of the Ordre national du Mérite and received a Médaille Beaumarchais from the Société des Auteurs et Compositeurs Dramatiques.

Bernart died on 12 February 2025, at the age of 92.

== Filmography ==
=== Producer/co-producer ===
- This Sweet Sickness (1977)
- Bye Bye Monkey (1978)
- Écoute voir (1979)
- Série noire (1979)
- Le Voyage en douce (1980)
- The Wings of the Dove (1981)
- Les Nanas (1985)
- I Love You (1986)
- Thérèse (1986)
- Agent trouble (1987)
- Bunker Palace Hôtel (1989)
- Nocturne Indien (1989)
- Alberto Express (1990)
- The King's Whore (1990)
- I Don't Kiss (1991)
- Not Everybody's Lucky Enough to Have Communist Parents (1993)
- ...à la campagne (1995)
- Tykho Moon (1996)
- Western (1997)
- C'est quoi la vie? (1999)
- Les Marins perdus (2003)

=== Actor ===
- Pentimento (1989)
- La Fille de l'air (1992)
- Crime Scenes (2000)
- Adolphe (2002)
- Ne quittez pas ! (2004)
- Villa Amalia (2009)
