= Chanel Solitaire =

1981 film by George Kaczender

- French poster
- Directed by: George Kaczender
- Written by: Julian More
- Based on: Chanel Solitaire by Claude Delay
- Produced by: Éric Rochat; Larry G. Spangler
- Starring: Marie-France Pisier; Timothy Dalton; Rutger Hauer; Karen Black
- Cinematography: Ricardo Aronovich
- Edited by: Georges Klotz
- Music by: Jean Musy
- Production companies: Eurocitel; Larry Spangler Productions; Gardenia Films
- Distributed by: Sunset Distribution; United Film Distribution Company
- Release dates: 16 October 1981 (New York); 12 October 1983 (France)
- Running time: 120 minutes
- Countries: France; United Kingdom; United States
- Language: English

Chanel Solitaire is a 1981 British-French-American historical drama film directed by George Kaczender and starring Marie-France Pisier, Timothy Dalton, Rutger Hauer, Brigitte Fossey, Karen Black, Lambert Wilson. The film's subject was Coco Chanel. Its budget was around £7 million. The film was based on the novel of the same title by Claude Delay. It was shot at the Billancourt Studios and location shooting in Deauville and Le Meux. The film's sets were designed by the art director Jacques Saulnier.

== Cast ==
- Marie-France Pisier as Coco Chanel
- Timothy Dalton as Boy Capel
- Rutger Hauer as Étienne Balsan
- Karen Black as Émilienne d'Alençon
- Brigitte Fossey as Adrienne
- Leila Fréchet as Young Coco Chanel
- Philippe Nicaud as Gabrielle's Father
- Alexandra Stewart as Nathalie
- Catherine Allégret as Gabrielle's Friend
- Hélène Vallier as Aunt Louise
- Jean-Marie Proslier as Poiret
- Nicole Maurey as Grande Dame
- Humbert Balsanas Robert
- Catherine Alcover as Lady
- Albert Augier as Headwaiter
- Corine Blue as Young Woman
- Lyne Chardonnet as Young Nun
- Yvonne Dany as Woman I
- Isabelle Duby as Leon's Girlfriend
- Huguette Faget as Woman II
- Louise Vincent as Matron
- David Gabison as Priest
- Louba Guertchikoff as Woman III
- Philippe Mareuil as Supervisor
- Jean-Gabriel Nordmann as Boy's Secretary
- Lionel Rocheman as Tailor
- Violetta Sanchez as Blandine
- Jimmy Shuman as Voice at La Rotonde
- Jean Valmont as Fat Man
- Sylvia Zerbib as Young Maid

== Bibliography ==
- Brown, Tom & Vidal, Belén. The Biopic in Contemporary Film Culture. Routledge, 2013.
- Goble, Alan. The Complete Index to Literary Sources in Film. Walter de Gruyter, 1999.
