= Sonn Mam =

First Khmer psychiatrist and Minister of Health and Foreign Affairs of Cambodia

Sonn Mam, or Mam Sonn in some documents, is a former Minister of Health and Minister of Foreign Affairs during the government of Huy Kanthoul leading to the Independence of Cambodia. He was also the first Khmer medical doctor and first Indochinese psychiatrist, founder of psychiatry in Cambodia.

== Biography ==
=== Youth and formation of a Cambodian noble elite ===
Sonn Mam was the son of Luong Tipsena, mandarin at the Royal Palace in Phnom Penh and nephew of Okhna Douch, Minister of Justice. Sonn Mam was born on October 29, 1890, in the thirty-first year of the reign of King Norodom during the French protectorate.

After obtaining the certificate of upper primary studies, he was designated in 1905 as a scholarship student of the Protectorate at the medical school of Hanoi. Graduating in 1910, he worked for some time in Cambodia, in Phnom Penh then in Vœunsai, Steung Treng then in Pailin, localities very far from the capital where he would have been sent for having protested against the dismissal of his uncle.

=== France: from volunteer in the army to psychiatry ===
At the start of the 1914-1918 war, he volunteered in the overseas troops and discovered France. Once peace had returned, Sonn Mam resumed his studies at the Paris medical faculty, where he obtained the degree of doctor at the beginning of 1925. He was part of a "small but influential group of Indochinese who studied in scientific and technical fields in France's most elite institutions" during the colonial era. Four years after him, in 1929, Norodom Ritharasi also obtained a doctorate in medecine and they were the only two Khmer citizens to do so before 1945. Two years earlier, in April 1923, he was appointed to the medical internship competition for the asylums of the Seine. He served as an intern in various hospitales among which:

- the Ville-Evrard Health Center under Doctor Paul Guiraud, with whom he wrote an article in the Annales Médico-Psychologique about systematized delirium with visual hallucinations and considerations on the psychology of delusions,
- the Maison-Blanche Asylum in Doctor Bonnet's department from May to October 1925, and
- the Sainte-Anne Hospital Center with Doctor Marcel Briand, where he had been a volunteer intern a few years previously and appreciated by the chief doctor:

On April 25, 1927, Sonn Mam was received 2nd in the competition for asylum doctor: he was appointed chief doctor of the Leyme asylum, in the department of Lot.

=== Indochina: returning with knowledge and experience ===
In 1928, Sonn Mam returned to Indochina, where he was appointed resident doctor at the important asylum of Biên Hoà until 1930, then doctor in the triage service for the insane at the hospital in Cho Quan, near Saigon (Cho Quan, in Cholon). From 1930 to 1939, he was the medical director of Biên Hoà.

Doctor Sonn Mam was eventually put in charge of the psychiatric hospital of Ta Khmau, near Phnom Penh, for which he designed the plans. Until 1965, he was the only doctor there, until the arrival of an assistant doctor, Doctor Chamrœun Sam Eun, his successor as medical director. The establishment that Sonn Mam directed from 1940 to his death, bore the name of its founder until its disappearance as such under the Pol Pot regime.

In addition to his teaching activities at the Royal Faculty of Medicine of Phnom Penh, of which he was dean from 1963 to 1965, Sonn Mam assumed high administrative and political functions: director of the health service from 1945 to 1948, minister of public health from 1948 to 1952, minister of foreign affairs from 1950 to 1952, president of the Council in 1950.

His son Sonn Voeunsai was a leader of the Democratic Party and had particularly served as minister in several cabinets with himself.

=== Death and burial ===
Sonn Mann was found was lung cancer in his seventy-seventh year, and he died shortly afterwards on Saturday January 22, 1966. On Sunday January 30, 1966, late in the afternoon, at the Wat Botum, in the presence of the leading personalities of the kingdom; of H. E. the Ambassador of France, his family led by H. E. Sonn Voeunsai, his first son, and the very dense crowd of his friends and acquaintances. Norodom Sihanouk, Samdech Head of State, paid him a final and solemn tribute.

== Legacy ==
Sonn Mam started set up the first psychiatric hospital of Cambodia in Ta Khmau. The buildings that he raised up are still standing, in the Chey Chumneas Hospital of Ta Khmau, which is still particularly renowned for the specialized psychiatric care provided to children with mental disabilities which was opened in 2001.

== Decorations ==
- Grand Cross of the Royal Order of Cambodia, a dignity conferred on him posthumously.
