= Jean Delay =

French psychiatrist, neurologist, writer

- Born: 14 November 1907; Bayonne, France
- Died: 29 May 1987 (aged 79); Paris, France
- Education: Salpêtrière Hospital, University of Paris
- Known for: First studies of the effects of chlorpromazine
- Children: 2 (Florence Delay, Claude Delay)
- Awards: Commander of the Legion of Honor, Grand Officer of the National Order of Merit, Commander of Arts and Letters
- Scientific career
- Fields: Psychiatry, literature
- Workplaces: Centre hospitalier Sainte-Anne
- Doctoral advisor: Georges Guillain (medical doctorate); Pierre Janet (doctorate in letters)
- Other academic advisors: Georges Dumas
- Doctoral students: Jean Garrabé; Jean Laplanche; Francis Pasche
- Other notable students: Pierre Deniker

Jean Delay (French: [ʒɑ̃ dəlɛ]; 14 November 1907 – 29 May 1987) was a French psychiatrist, neurologist, writer, and a member of the Académie française (Chair 17).

His assistant Pierre Deniker conducted a test of chlorpromazine on the male mental ward where Delay worked, and the two published their findings (quickly, with what has been called academic gamesmanship) in 1952. Chlorpromazine turned out to be the first effective drug treatment for mental illness and it had a profound effect on the mentally ill and mental asylums.

In 1968–1970, student revolutionaries attacked his offices, and Delay was forced into retirement from medicine. In later life, he lived as a writer.

== Family and education ==
The son of Maurice Delay, a successful surgeon and mayor of Bayonne, at age fourteen Delay earned a baccalaureate in philosophy. He studied medicine in Paris. After studying in hospitals for twenty years, especially the teaching of Pierre Janet and Georges Dumas, he turned to psychiatry. He also specialized in neurology at the Salpêtrière Hospital. He wrote his doctoral thesis on astereognosis in 1935. He then undertook the study at the Sorbonne and in 1942 wrote his doctoral thesis (doctorate in letters) on diseases of memory. He received degrees in medicine, literature, and philosophy.

Jean Delay was the father of Florence Delay, of the Académie française (Seat 10), and of Claude Delay, novelist and psychoanalyst.

== Career ==
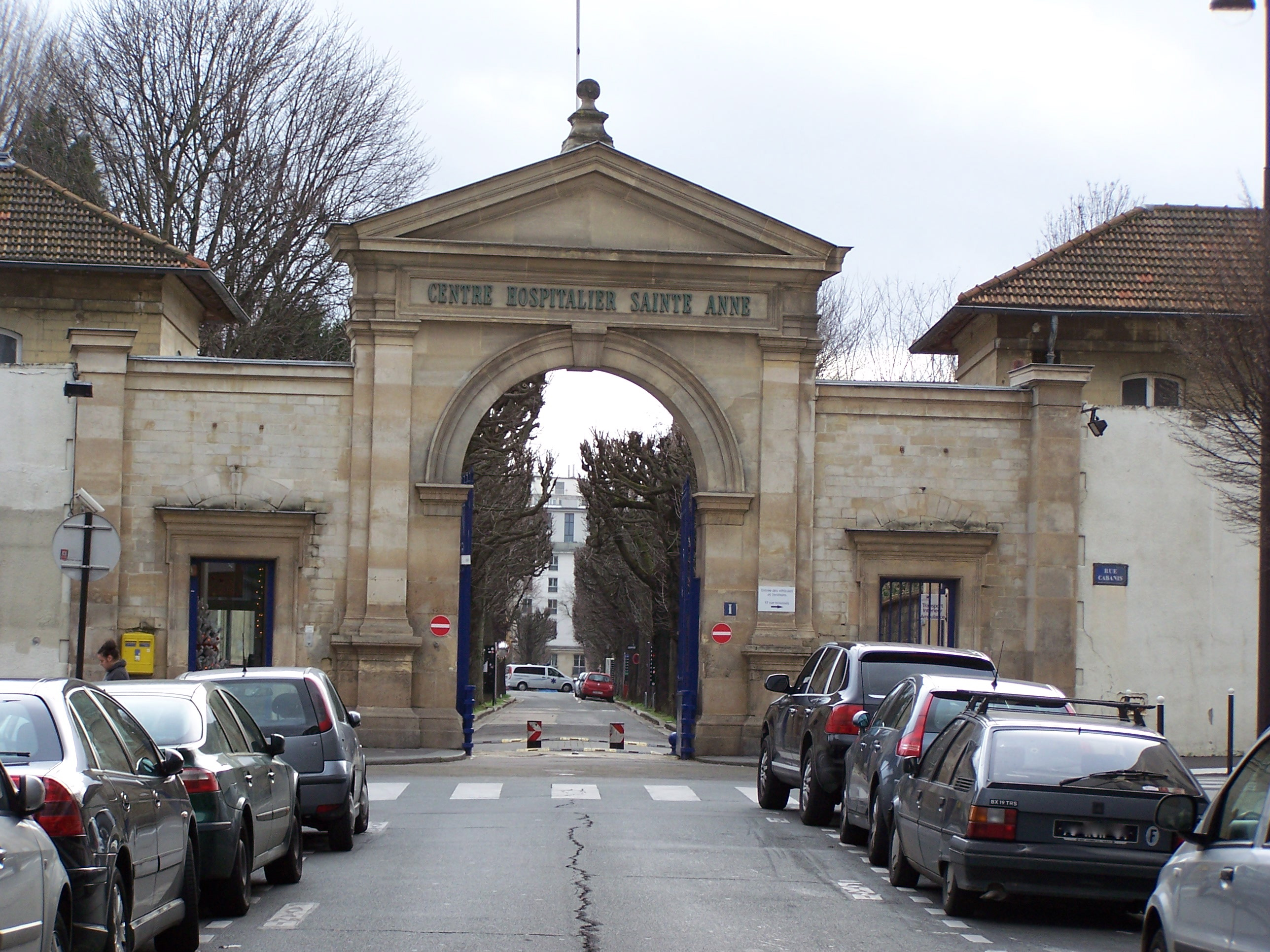
Delay was chair of the department of psychiatry at the Centre hospitalier Sainte-Anne from 1946 to 1970.

He received training in the psychiatry clinic of Henri Ey at the Centre hospitalier Sainte-Anne. There he became the chair of the clinic of mental illness in 1946. He remained at the hospital until 1970 when he retired from medicine. With Ey, Delay organized the First World Congress of Psychiatry and founded the World Psychiatric Association (WPA). Today, the WPA awards a Jean Delay Prize every three years.

Delay twice served as president of the WPA (1950 and 1957), and also as president of the French language Congress of Neurology and Psychiatry (1954), the Society Medico-Psychologique (1960), the International Congress of Psychosomatic Medicine (1960), and the Collegium Internationale Neuro-Psychopharmacologicum (CINP) (1966). He was elected to the National Academy of Medicine in 1955.

He and the Soviet delegation examined Rudolf Hess during the Nuremberg trials, and found hysterical amnesia but not insanity in the strict sense.

During his scientific career, Delay published more than 700 articles and over 40 books. In 1957, he developed with his assistant Pierre Deniker a classification of pharmacological and recreational drugs that was validated by the World Congress of Psychiatry in 1961.

== Pharmacological and recreational drugs studies ==
Delay pioneered research on drugs including LSD, mescaline, and psilocybin. Delay's name came first on these papers in part because he was the leader of a department with strong hierarchy.

Delay's team studied isoniazid (INH) and its effect on depression, around 1952.

Delay discovered, jointly with J. M. Harl and Pierre Deniker, who was Delay's co-worker and also a psychiatrist, that chlorpromazine, the first neuroleptic, produced a considerable reduction in the agitation and aggression of those patients with symptoms of schizophrenia. Known first as a "ganglio-plegic", he first called the drug "neuroplégique" then finally a "neuroleptic". Deniker, with Harl and Delay, published the success with chlorpromazine in May 1952. Chlorpromazine reached common use by 1957 worldwide, except in the United States where medications were then still considered less useful than psychodynamic therapy. While this was not his most important scientific contribution, it became the most famous.

It was, however, Deniker who shared the prestigious Lasker-DeBakey Clinical Medical Research Award with Henri Laborit (who first recognized the drug's applications in psychiatry) and Heinz Lehmann in 1957. As explained in the American Journal of Psychiatry and elsewhere, no one won a Nobel Prize for the discovery.

== Student revolution ==
In May 1968, a group of about five hundred revolutionary student followers of Leon Trotsky professing antipsychiatry attacked his offices. The students felt that chemicals were straitjackets and demanded that psychiatry be removed from medicine. Within two years they forced Delay's retirement. He decided to work on literature, which was his first love.

== Literature ==
Delay was elected to the Académie française in 1959 and wrote remarkable biographical studies on the Youth of André Gide (1956–1957), and his maternal ancestors in the four volumes of Preliminary Memory (1979–1986). His essay Psychiatry and Psychology The Immoraliste earned him the Grand Prix in criticism. He used the pseudonym Jean Faurel from his days at Salpêtrière until sometime before 1959.

== Awards ==
- Commander of the Legion of Honour
- Commander of the Ordre des Arts et des Lettres
- Grand officer of the National Order of Merit
- Commander of the Ordre de la Santé publique
- Elected to the Académie française in 1959, succeeding Georges Lecomte

== Works ==
- Les Dissolutions de la mémoire, Preface by Pierre Janet, 1942, PUF
- Brain Waves and psychology, Presses Universitaires de France (PUF) 1942
- The Dissolution of Memory, Foreword by Pierre Janet, Presses Universitaires de France, 1942
- The gray city, romance, Flammarion, 1946
- The Relaxing, novel, Gallimard, 1947
- Nameless men, news, Gallimard, 1948
- Medical psychology studies, Presses Universitaires de France, 1953
- Youth Gide, Gallimard, 1956–1957
- Brain Electricity, Presses Universitaires de France, 1973
- Before Memory, Gallimard, 1979, 4th prize Pierre-Lafue Foundation 1980
- The Euchre grid, story, Gallimard, 1988

== See also ==
- Antipsychotic § History
- Michel Foucault, one of Delay's patients
