= Dornac =

French photographer (1858–1941)

Dornac (French pronunciation: [dɔʁnak]), Paul Marsan or Pol Marsan ([pɔl maʁsɑ̃]), pseudonyms of Paul François Arnold Cardon (6 January 1858 – 10 January 1941), was a French photographer.

== Biography ==
Born in Paris, Dornac was active since the 1880s, specializing in portraits of personalities photographed at home or at work. He is the author of a series of photographic portraits from 1887 to 1917 entitled Nos contemporains chez eux.

Many of Dornac's portraits have been taken either directly or after wood engraving, in Le Monde illustré between 1890 and 1900.

Dornac died in the 14th arrondissement of Paris on 10 January 1941 at age 83 and is buried at Père Lachaise Cemetery (74th division).

== Gallery ==
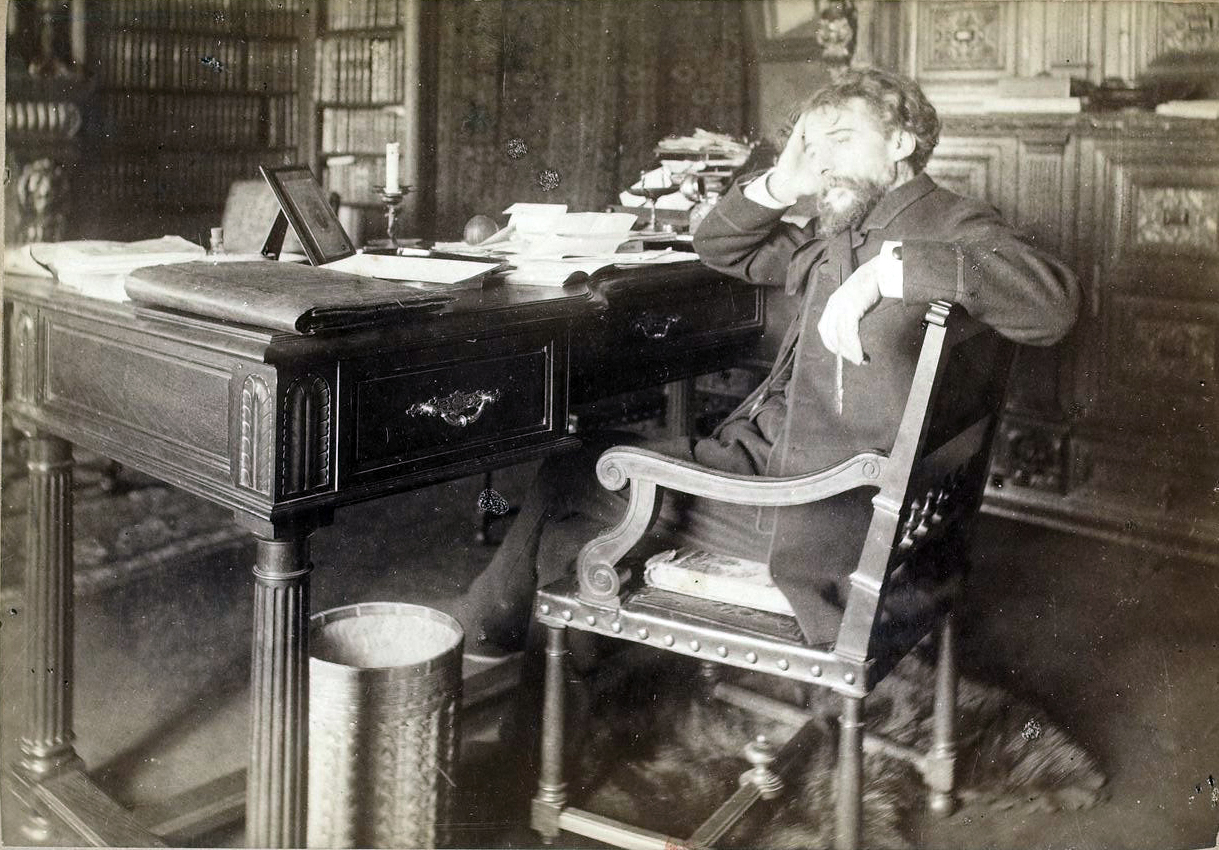
Alphonse Daudet.

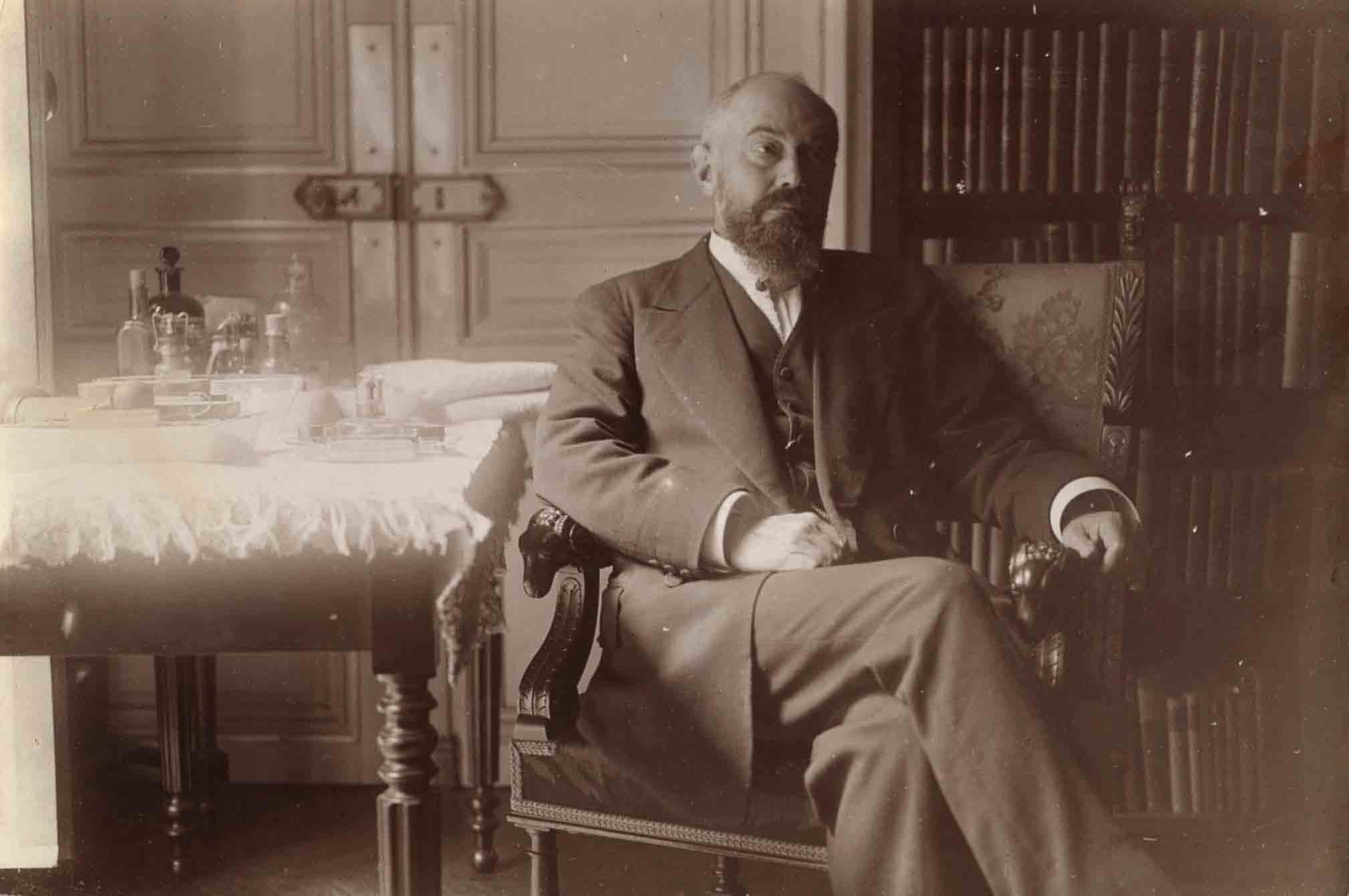
Pierre Janet.

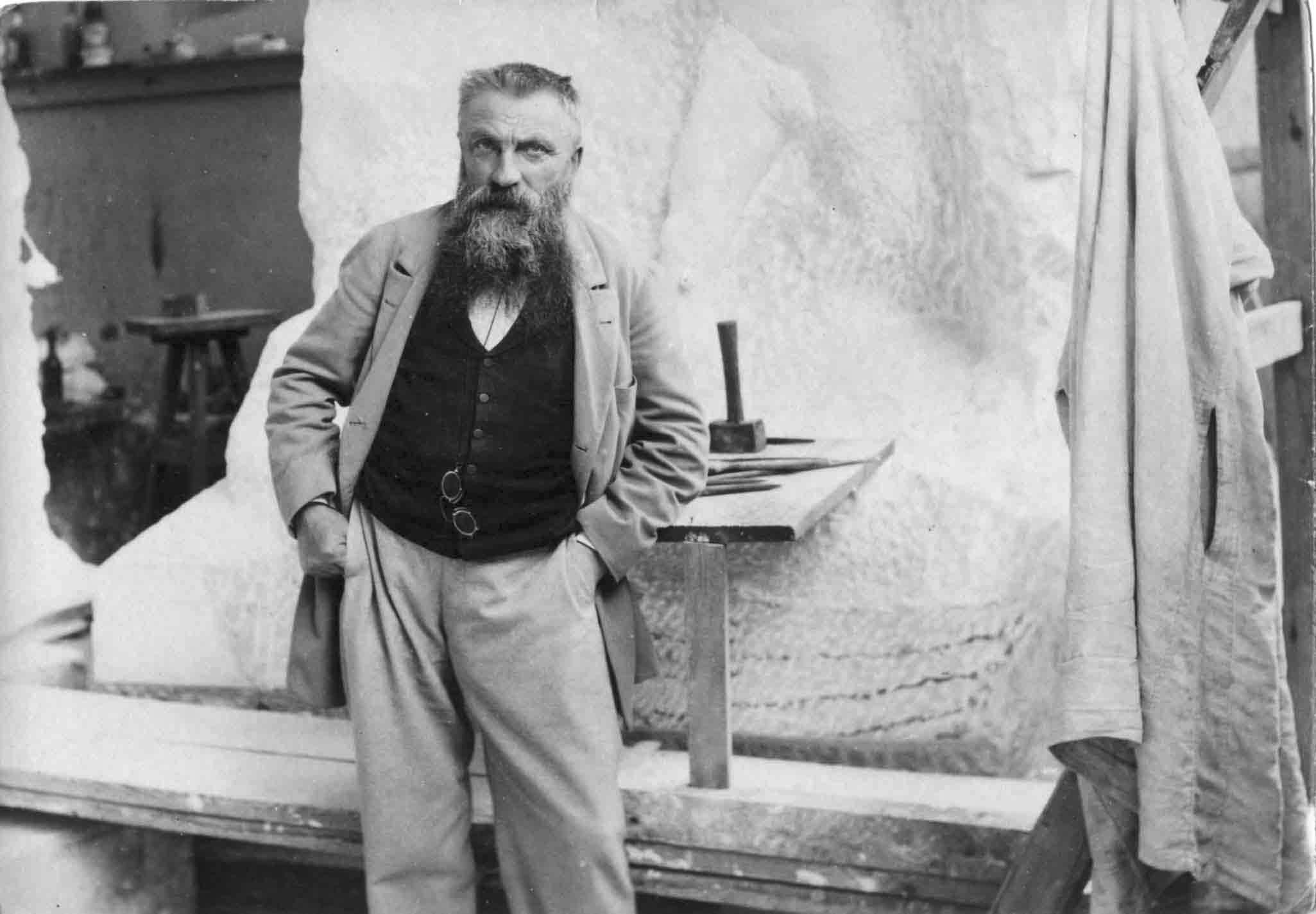
Auguste Rodin.

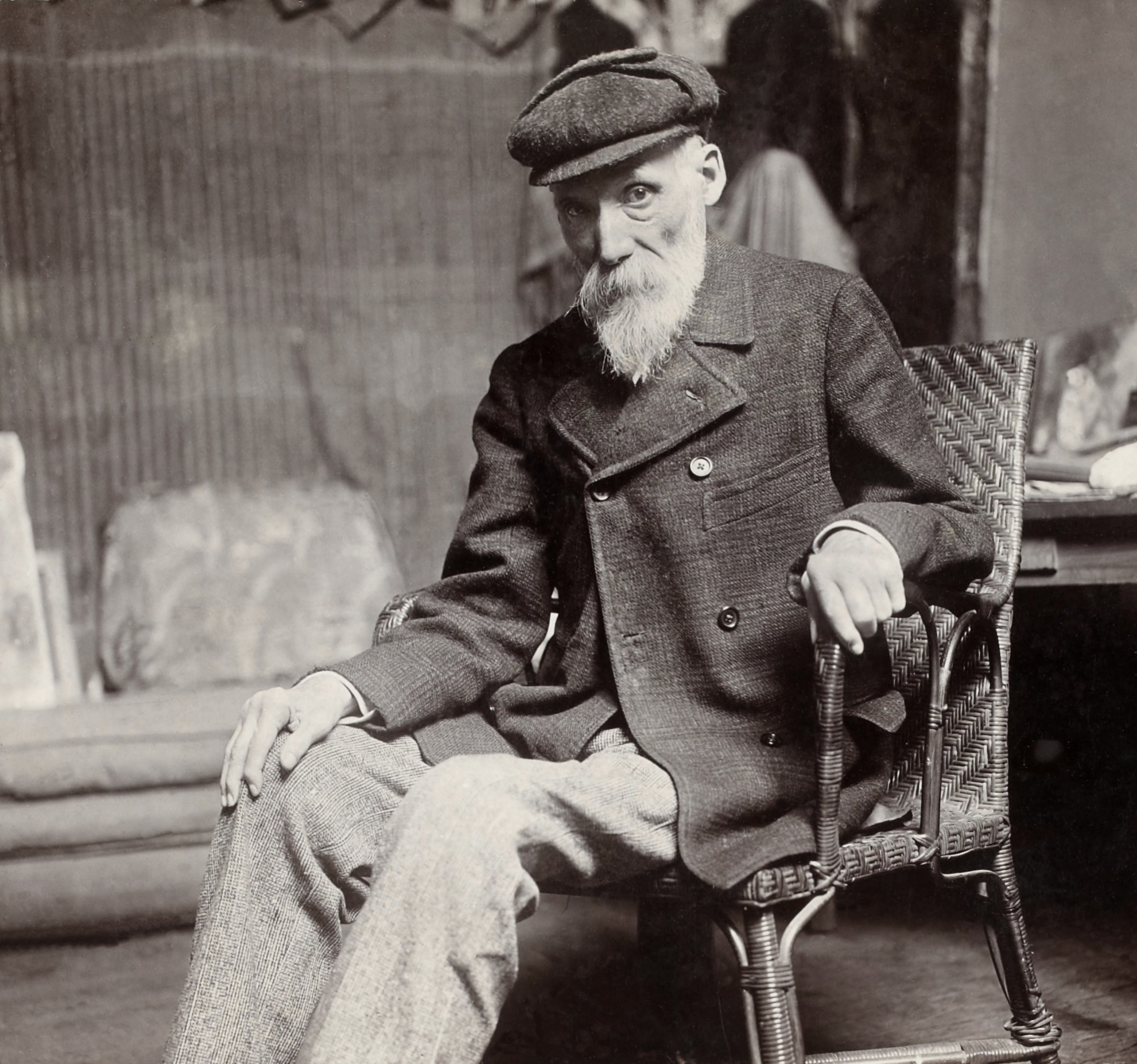
Auguste Renoir.

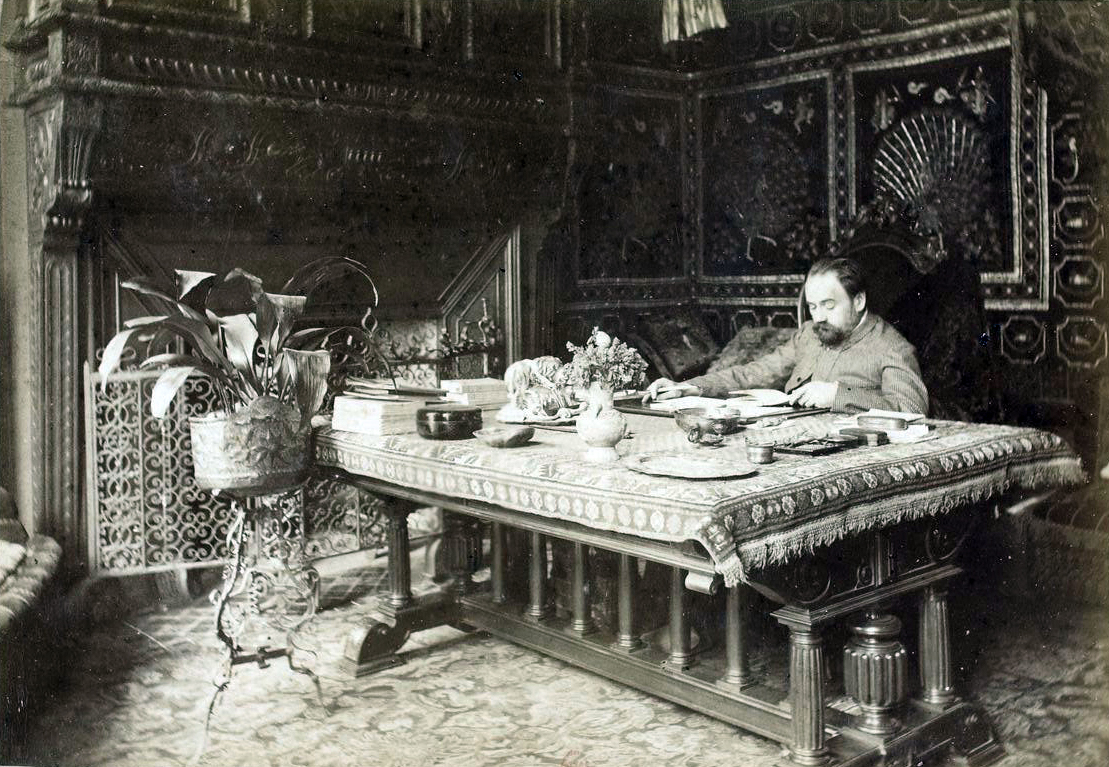
Émile Zola.

== Bibliography ==
- Elizabeth Emery, "Dornac's 'At Home' Photographs, Proceedings of the Society for the Study of French History, 36 (2008).
- Elizabeth Emery, Le Photojournalisme et la naissance des maisons-musées d’écrivains en France (1881-1914). Grenoble, Les Editions de l’Université Savoie Mont Blanc, 2016, (p. 103-174).
- Marie Mallard, Étude de la série de Dornac : nos contemporains chez eux, 1887–1917 – Personnalités et espaces en représentation, mémoire de maîtrise en Histoire de l'art, Paris 4, 1999.
- Valérie Sasportas, Des stars fin de siècle dans l'objectif, in Le Figaro, 23 June 2011.
- Agnès de Gouvion Saint-Cyr, Photo Graphies Artistes & interprètes Collection Dornac : nos contemporains chez eux, 1858–1941 - Exposition publique et vente des lots des photos d'un propriétaire, Piasa, Paris, 2015
