= The Others (1974 film) =

1974 film

- Directed by: Hugo Santiago
- Written by: Adolfo Bioy Casares; Jorge Luis Borges; Hugo Santiago
- Produced by: Anna Maria Papi
- Starring: Maurice Born
- Cinematography: Ricardo Aronovich
- Edited by: Christiane Perato; Alberto Yaccelini
- Music by: Edgardo Cantón
- Release date: May 1974
- Running time: 127 minutes
- Country: France
- Language: French

The Others (French: Les autres) is a 1974 French drama film directed by Hugo Santiago. It was entered into the 1974 Cannes Film Festival.

== Plot ==
After his son kills himself, Roger Spinoza, a Parisian book seller, seeks out the people who knew him. He speaks to a young director attempting to film his son's screenplay. He meets and subsequently begins a relationship with Valérie, the young woman who was with him the night he died. Meanwhile, Valérie's lover, Lucien, suspects her infidelity.

== Cast ==
- Maurice Born - Durtain
- Noëlle Chatelet - Valérie
- Patrice Dally - Roger Spinoza
- Pierrette Destanque - Agnès
- Bruno Devoldère - Mathieu Spinoza
- Dominique Guezenec - Béatrice Alain
- Pierre Julien - M. Marcel
- Marc Monnet - Vidal
- Roger Planchon - Alexis Artaxerxès
- Jean-Daniel Pollet - Adam
- Daniel Vignat - Lucien Moreau
