= Georges Daumezon =

French psychiatrist

Georges Daumezon (3 June 1912 – 6 May 1979) was a French psychiatrist.

== Biography ==
Born into a Protestant family, he was a scout leader with the Eclaireuses et Eclaireurs Unionistes de France(Unionist Scouts of France) and became friends with Émile Guigou . He studied in Montpellier and Paris, where he obtained a law degree in 1932 and a doctorate in medicine in 1935, with a thesis on La Situation du personnel infirmier des asiles d'aliénés (The Situation of Nursing Staff in Mental Asylums). This work earned him the Baillarger Prize from the Académie nationale de médecine the following year . Deeply committed to the role of nurses, in 1949 he and Germaine Le Guillant created training courses within the framework of the CEMEA (Center for Training in Active Education Methods).

He became medical director of the hospital in Sarreguemines and was then appointed medical director of the psychotherapeutic institution in Fleury-les-Aubrais in 1938, one of the places that marked the beginnings of Institutional psychotherapy. He held this position until 1951.

A doctor at psychiatric hospitals in the Seine region in 1951, he spent a year and a half heading up a department at the Maison Blanche psychiatric hospital in Neuilly-sur-Marne, currently one of four specialist psychiatric institutions in Paris serving the northeastern quarter of the city. In 1952, Daumezon and Koechlin introduced the term “institutional psychotherapy” for the first time.

He then became chief Sainte-Anne Hospital Center and Henri-Rousselle psychiatric hospitals, where he developed the admissions system by creating the psychiatric orientation and reception center (CPOA), which now bears his name.

After the liberation, he played an important role in transforming the practice of psychiatry. He was a member of the Batia group, alongside Julian de Ajuriaguerra, Bonnafé, Duchêne, Ey, Fouquet, Follin, Lacan, Le Guillant, and Sivadon.

He participated in the creation of the Union of Psychiatric Hospital Doctors on July 9, 1945, which he would lead for about ten years. This union was a continuation of the “Friendly Association of Doctors in Public Mental Institutions in France.” Its publication is L'Information psychiatrique. At the time, this union only represented 220 civil servant doctors.
