= État second =

French psychology term

État second (French for Second State) refers to the state of mind into which some French authors go when writing short stories. It mixes abstraction and concentration at the same time, ironically telling sometimes more facts than in conscious writing. The Argentine writer Julio Cortázar often uses this method to write, as he called it "the moment of maximum creativity".

== Concept ==
Pierre Janet was one of the first to subscribe to the concept of État second and he maintained that it is created through the synthesis of a split consciousness. Here, the first state is designated the normal state while the second, the exceptional state. It is in the second state where experiences are united in the closed personality with each personality may know nothing about each other. In État second, the consciousness is clouded so that two personalities that are very different override each other with one appearing in place of the other. The personalities involved one that is normal while the other is aberrant and they follow each other in successions.

In psychology, État second is also referred to as the "new state" in the condition called alternating personality. This is manifested in the mental state of hysterics. It is said that the notion of idee fixe, the subconscious that separated from ordinary consciousness, forms the nucleus of the État second. For instance, a patient falls to a hysterical sleep and forgets all his previous existence upon waking. However, it is said that all of the ordinary faculties such as speaking and movement are transferred to the new state.

== Cultural references ==
- The French version of the American movie Fearless (1993), directed by Peter Weir, was called État Second.
- The Argentine online magazine L´Etat Second mag also took its name from this term.
