= Jean Garrabé =

French psychiatrist (1931–2020)

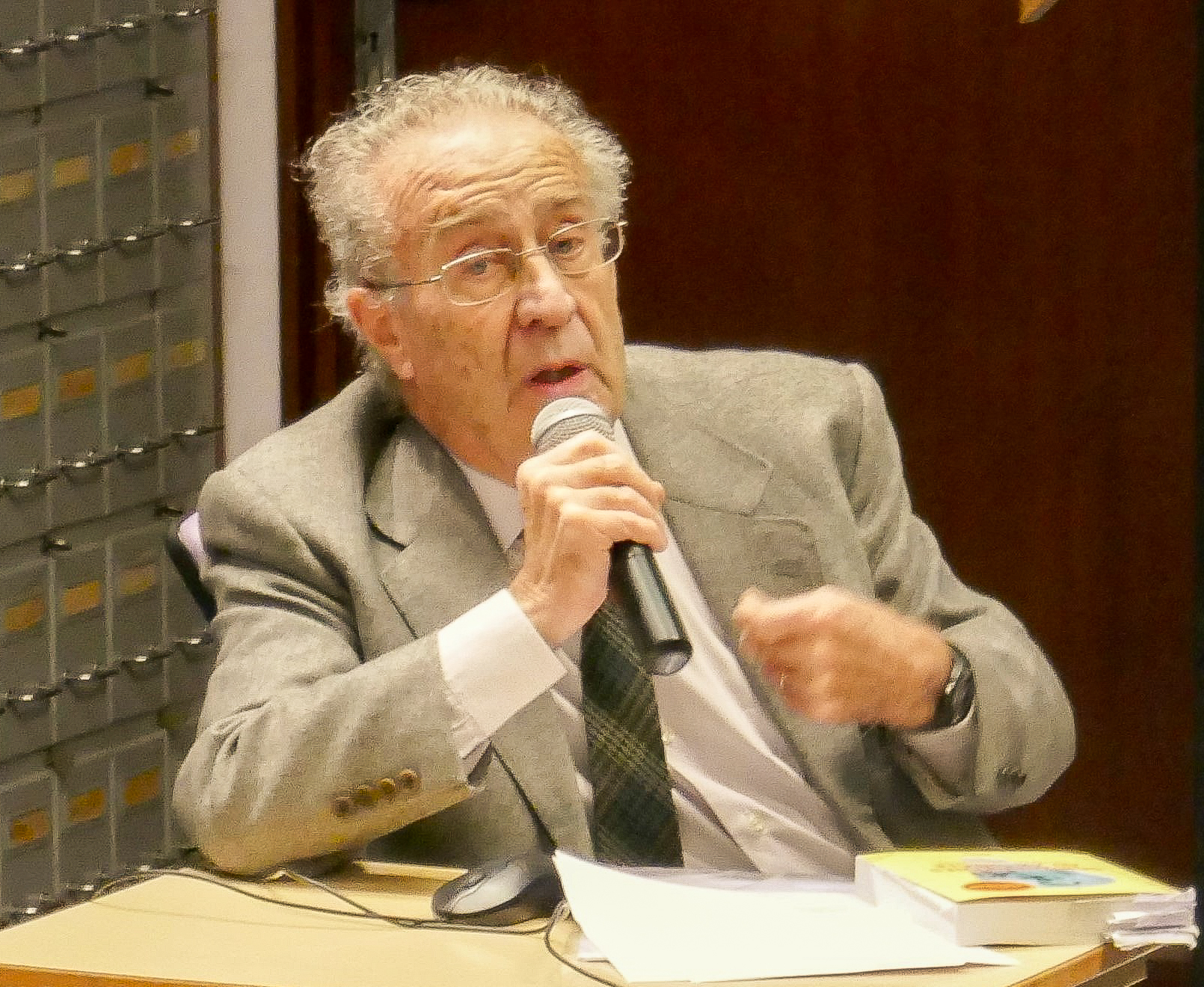
- Born: 11 August 1931; Berck, France
- Died: 13 September 2020 (aged 89); Paris, France
- Occupation: Psychiatrist
- Scientific career
- Doctoral advisors: Jean Delay

Jean Garrabé (11 August 1931 – 13 September 2020) was a French psychiatrist.

== Biography ==
Born to a Spanish mother, Garrabé went to secondary school at the Lycée Français de Madrid. He then studied medicine in Paris. He first worked for the Institut Marcel Rivière.

After interning at psychiatric hospitals, Garrabé took an interest in the history of psychiatry. He performed psychoanalyses with the Paris Psychoanalytic Society. He also published a book on Henri Ey.

Garrabé was an honorary member of the World Psychiatric Association. He became director of clinical teaching at the West Campus of Paris Descartes University in 1989.

Jean Garrabé died in Paris on 13 September 2020 at the age of 89.

== Books ==
- Histoire de la schizophrénie (1992)
- Henri Ey et la pensée psychiatrique contemporaine (1997)
- La Schizophrénie (2003)
- Promenades dans le paris de la folie. Les êtres et les lieux (2015)
- Classification française des troubles mentaux - R-2015. Correspondance et transcodage - CIM10 (2015)

== Articles ==
- "La Dimension sociale de la psychiatrie française" (2002)
- "De la criminologie à la psychiatrie en milieu pénitentiaire" (2006)
- "Sémiotique de l'aliénation mentale" (2007)
- "Histoire de la psychothérapie en France" (2012)
- "Psychoses à base d’automatisme" (2017)
- "Histoire des échanges dans le domaine de la psychiatrie entre la France et les pays d’Amérique latine" (2019)
