= Jean Talairach =

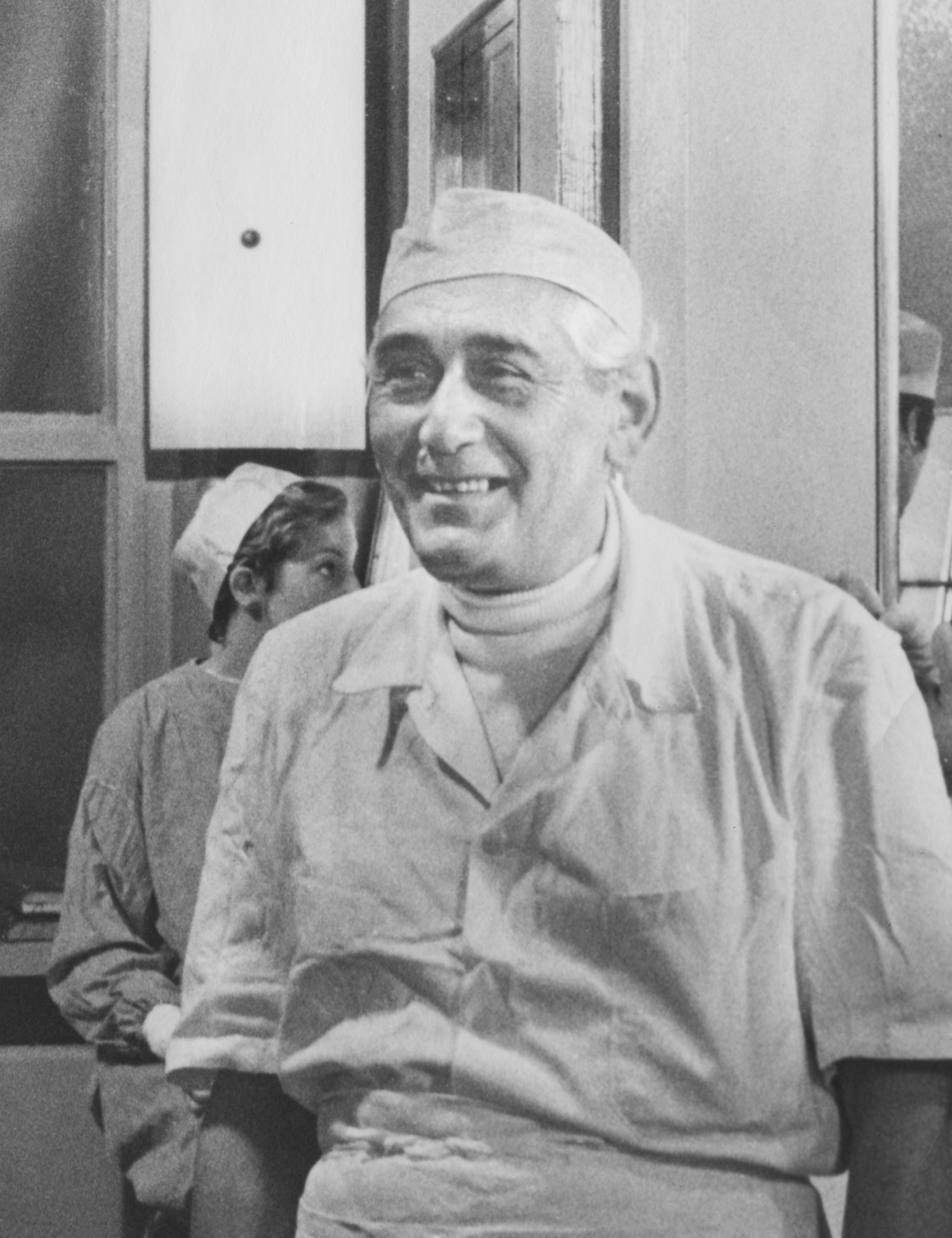
Jean Talairach

Jean Talairach (January 15, 1911 – March 15, 2007) was a psychiatrist and neurosurgeon who practiced at the Sainte-Anne Hospital Center in Paris, and who is noted for the Talairach coordinates, which are relevant in stereotactic neurosurgery.

== Early life ==
Talairach was the son of a pianist, and learned the cello to a professional level. However, instead of pursuing a musical career, he then developed a passion for geometry and architecture, and was particularly interested in the lecture halls in the medieval medical college in Montpellier. This interest, in turn, led him to become interested in medicine, especially psychiatry. In 1938 he traveled to Paris to study medicine. He completed his doctoral studies at Ste. Anne's Hospital, one of the oldest and most renowned hospitals in France.

== World War II ==
During the German occupation of France in the second World War, Talairach joined the French resistance. He created a detailed map of the tunnels under Paris, which he gave to the allies. In 1944 he was inducted into the Legion of honor.

== Literature ==
J. Talairach and P. Tournoux, "Co-planar Stereotaxic Atlas of the Human Brain: 3-Dimensional Proportional System - an Approach to Cerebral Imaging", Thieme Medical Publishers, New York, 1988

J. Talairach and P. Tournoux, "Referentially Oriented Cerebral MRI Anatomy: An Atlas of Stereotaxic Anatomical Correlations for Gray and White Matter", Thieme Medical Publishers, New York, 1993

Electronic Talairach Atlases on CD-ROMs

W.L. Nowinski, A. Thirunavuukarasuu, A.L. Benabid, "The Cerefy Clinical Brain Atlas: Enhanced Edition with Surgical Planning and Intraoperative Support", Thieme Medical Publishers, New York, 2005

W.L. Nowinski and A. Thirunavuukarasuu, "The Cerefy Clinical Brain Atlas on CD-ROM", Thieme Medical Publishers, New York, 2004

W.L. Nowinski, A. Thirunavuukarasuu, R.N. Bryan, "The Cerefy Atlas of Brain Anatomy: An Introduction to Reading Radiological Scans for Students, Teachers, and Researchers", Thieme Medical Publishers, New York, 2002

W.L. Nowinski, A. Thirunavuukarasuu, D.N. Kennedy, "Brain Atlas for Functional Imaging: Clinical and Research Applications", Thieme, New York, 2000

W.L. Nowinski, R.N. Bryan, R. Raghavan, "The Electronic Clinical Brain Atlas: Multiplanar Navigation of the Human Brain", Thieme Medical Publishers, New York, 1997 (foreword written by Dr. Jean Talairach)
