= Invasión =

- Theatrical release poster
- Directed by: Hugo Santiago
- Written by: Adolfo Bioy Casares; Jorge Luis Borges; Hugo Santiago
- Produced by: Hugo Santiago
- Starring: Olga Zubarry; Lautaro Murúa; Juan Carlos Paz; Lito Cruz
- Cinematography: Ricardo Aronovich; Adelqui Camuso
- Edited by: Oscar Montauti
- Music by: Edgardo Canton
- Distributed by: Proartel S.A.
- Release date: 16 October 1969
- Running time: 123 minutes
- Country: Argentina
- Language: Spanish

Invasión is an Argentine science fiction mystery film released in 1969 and directed by Hugo Santiago and written by Santiago together with Jorge Luis Borges and Adolfo Bioy Casares. Widely regarded as an important cult film, its style is considered as intermediate between classic cinema and the French nouvelle vague.

In a survey of the 100 greatest films of Argentine cinema carried out by the Museo del Cine Pablo Ducrós Hicken in 2000, the film reached the 38th position. In a new version of the survey organized in 2022 by the specialized magazines La vida útil, Taipei and La tierra quema, presented at the Mar del Plata International Film Festival, the film reached the 2nd position.

== Plot ==
A group of men commanded by an older man attempts to stop an invasion of the city of Aquilea. The invaders are met by common men who defend the city, but it is ignored by the people in general, and as the film continues it is understood that the invasion is absolute and impossible to define. The defeat of the defenders is evident from the beginning, as in the "Trojan War."

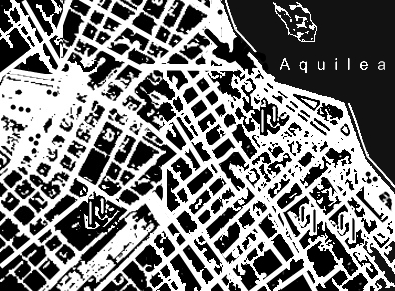
Map of Aquilea

== Characters ==
- Don Porfirio, played by Juan Carlos Paz: He is the head of the defenders. He calls one by one, giving them the instructions, but he also has other plans.
- Julián Herrera, played by Lautaro Murúa: Commands the men who fight the invaders. Flat Hero, without visible emotions, almost the prototype of the Borgean compadrito.
- Irene, played by Olga Zubarry: Herrera's wife, has a double life, and the discovery of this double life is the final surprise of the film.

== Production ==
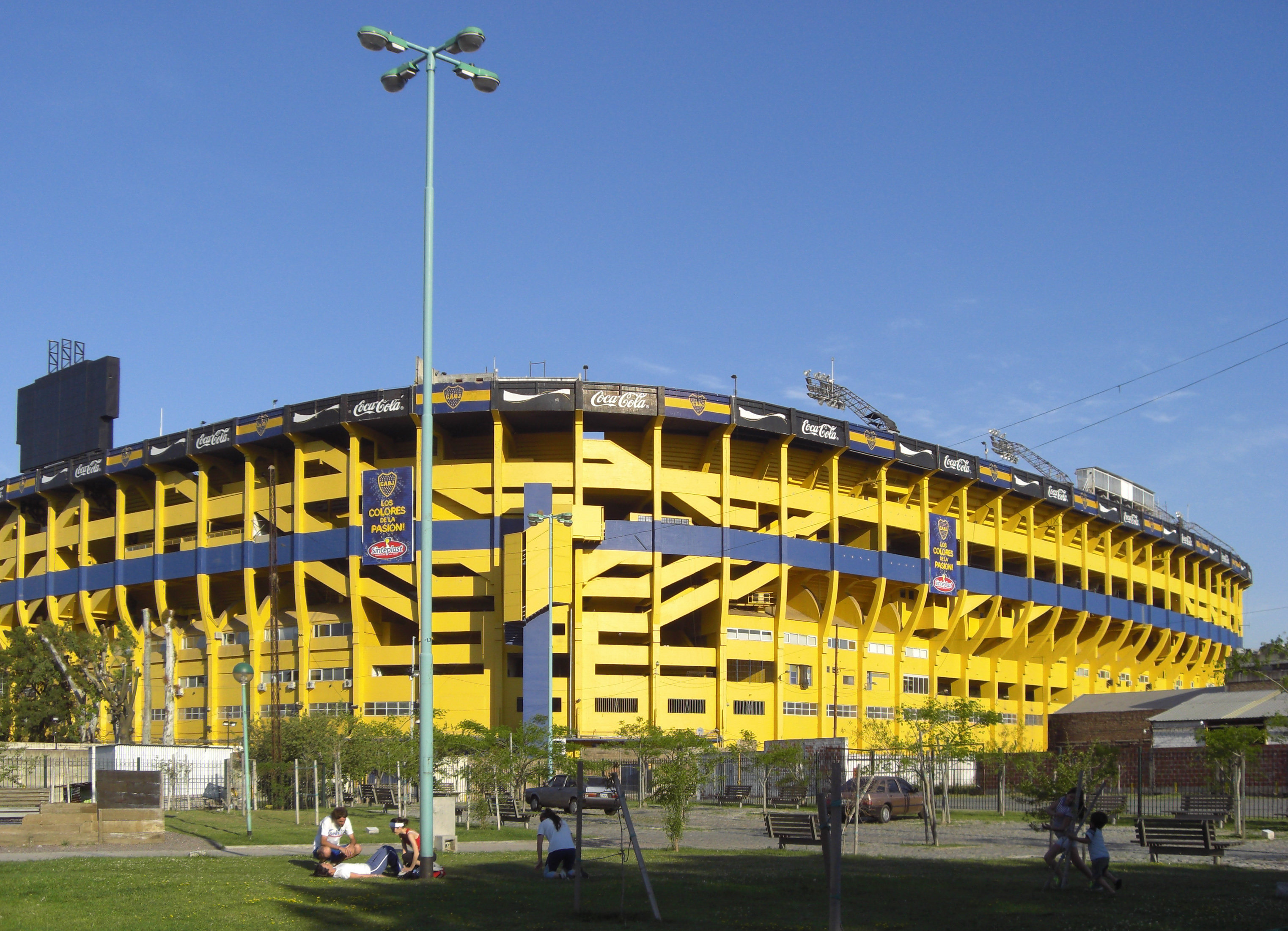
Boca Juniors' stadium, La Bombonera, was one of the locations of the film

Part of the film was shot in the Boca Juniors stadium.

== History ==
Some negative rolls were lost during the Argentine dictatorship of 1976–1983. The film was restored in France in the 1990s using the surviving negatives and lower-quality positives.

Invasión was premiered at the Cannes International Film Festival during the first Directors Fortnight and won an award later in 1969 at the Locarno International Film Festival.

== Connections ==
- The city: The story speaks of Buenos Aires, calling it Aquilea.
- El Eternauta: The invaders arrive to Buenos Aires, defended by a dispersed group, that knows that the defense is impossible, and the final victory of the invaders by their large number was used in the comic strip El Eternauta of Héctor Germán Oesterheld of 1957.
- The Trojan War: The epic of the defeated begins to Iliad.

== See also ==
- Alphaville, a New Wave black-and-white film featuring men in trench-coats traveling around a city.
