= Lycée La Fontaine (Paris) =

Coordinates: 48°50′41″N 2°15′23″E

Lycée Jean-de-La-Fontaine
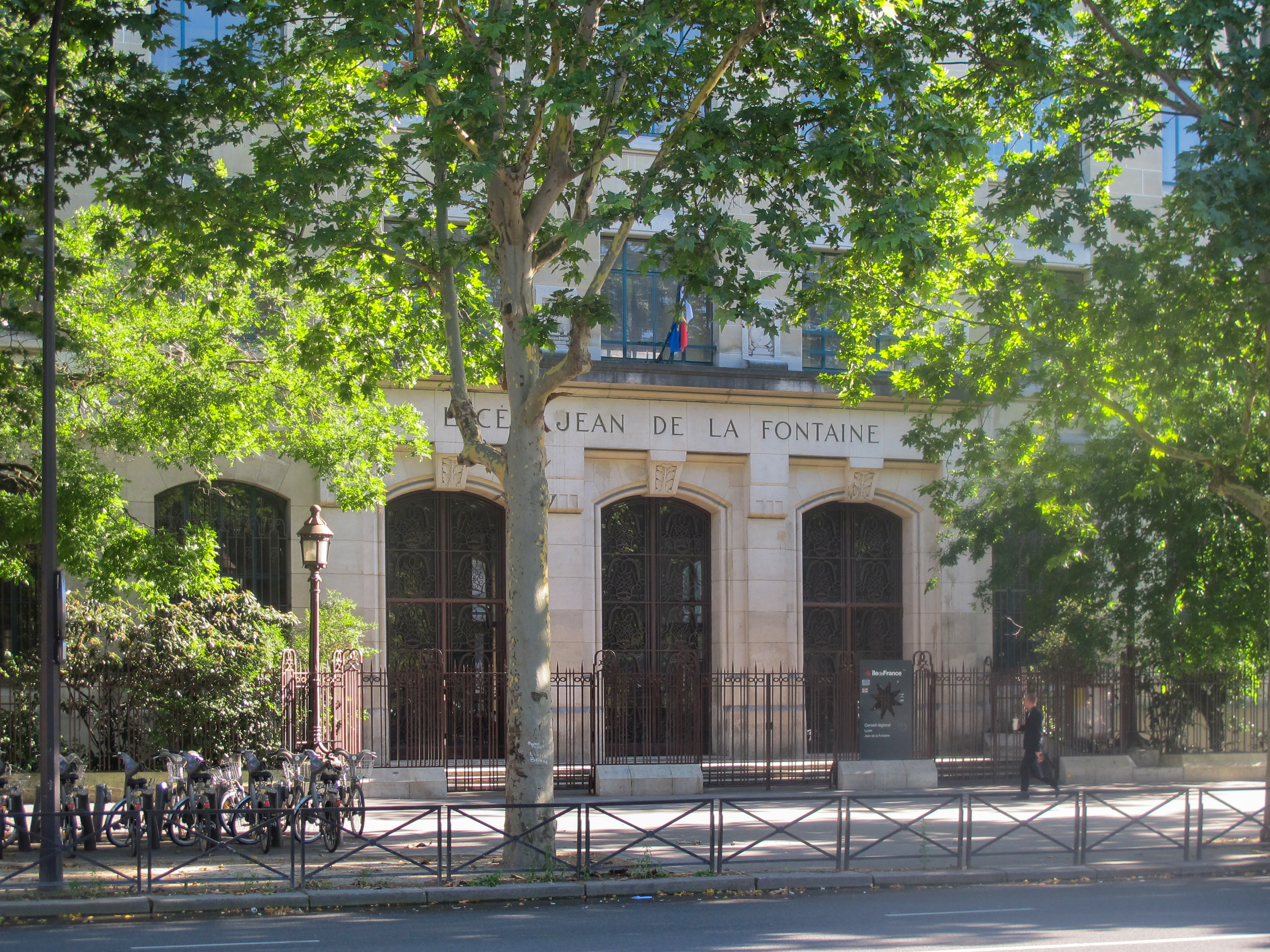

Address
- 1 Place de la Porte-Molitor; 75016 Paris; France

Information
- Type: Collège, Lycée
- Established: 1938
- School district: Académie de Paris
- Principal: Madame Dodinet
- Website: Official website

Lycée Jean-de-La-Fontaine is a lycée in the 16th arrondissement of Paris, France.

The school building, in the shape of an "open rectangle", was constructed on top of ancient fortifications. Construction began in 1935 and finished in 1938. Towards the end of World War II it was used as an American hospital.
