= Écoute voir =

- Directed by: Hugo Santiago
- Written by: Hugo Santiago; Claude Ollier
- Starring: Catherine Deneuve; Sami Frey; Anne Parillaud; Florence Delay
- Cinematography: Ricardo Aronovich
- Edited by: Alberto Yaccelini
- Music by: Michel Portal; Franz Schubert; Mozart; Johann Sebastian Bach
- Distributed by: Gaumont Distribution
- Release date: 7 March 1979
- Running time: 120 minutes
- Country: France
- Language: French

Écoute voir is a 1979 French drama-thriller film directed by Hugo Santiago from a screenplay by Santiago and Claude Ollier. It stars Catherine Deneuve, Sami Frey, and Anne Parillaud.

== Synopsis ==
Arnaud de Maule, young lord of the manor, distinguished scholar, has resort to the detective Claude Alphand (Catherine Deneuve), so that she might make enquiries into some individuals who are getting into his estate in Yvelines. Claude discovers that it is a question of the members of a strange sect, the Church of the Final Revival, which has recently won over Chloé, the young mistress of Arnaud.

== Cast ==
- Catherine Deneuve : Claude Alphand
- Sami Frey : Arnaud de Maule
- Florence Delay : Flora Thibaud
- Anne Parillaud : Chloé/Moune
- Didier Haudepin : Claude's secretary
- Antoine Vitez : delegate of the sect
- Jean-François Stévenin : Inspector Mercier
- François Dyrek : Inspector Daloup
