= Pierre Deniker =

French psychiatrist (1917–1998)

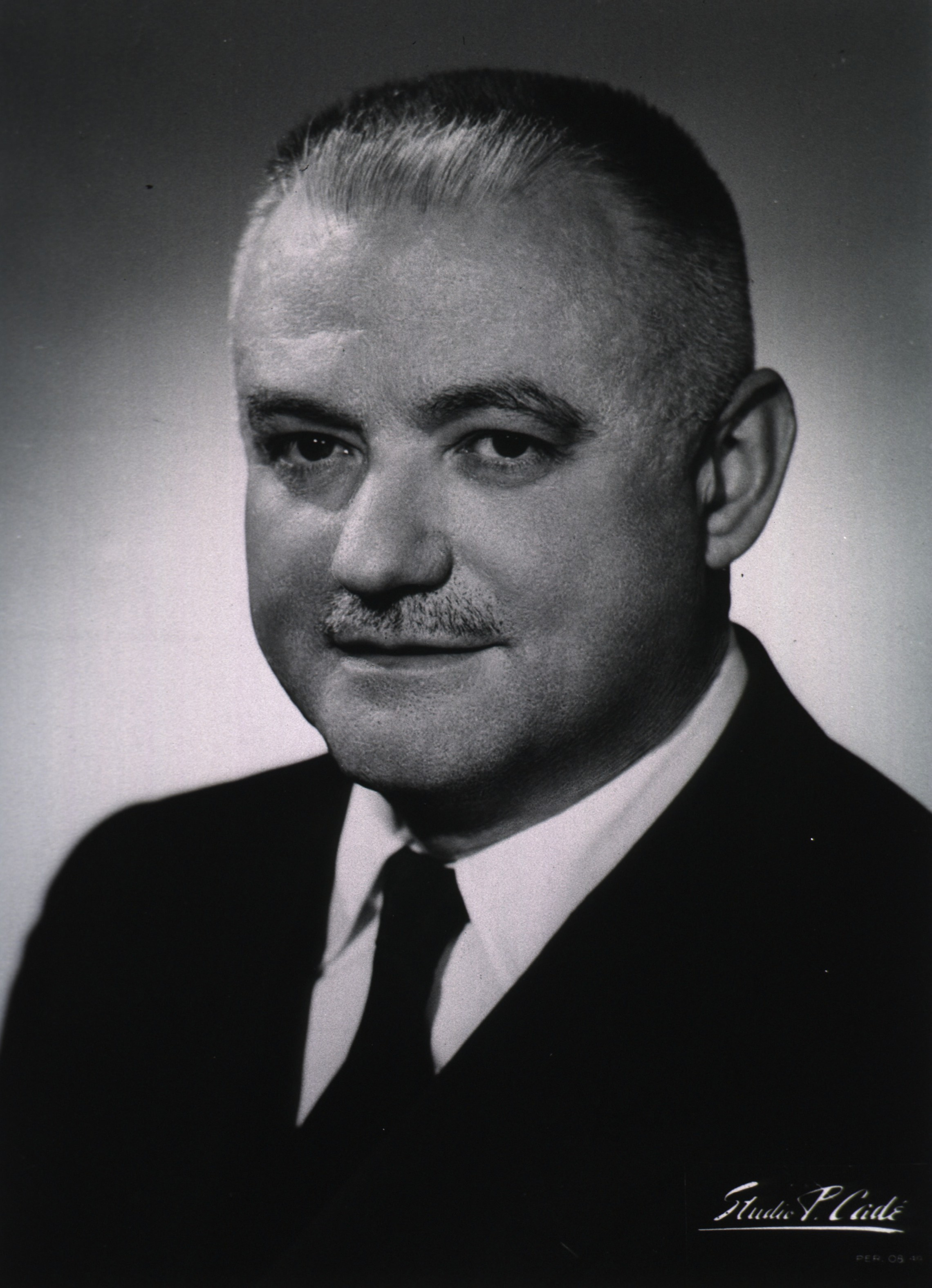
Pierre Deniker

Pierre Deniker (16 February 1917, Paris – 17 August 1998, Paris) was a French psychiatrist who was involved, jointly with Jean Delay and J. M. Harl, in the introduction of chlorpromazine (Thorazine), the first antipsychotic used in the treatment of schizophrenia, in the 1950s. Thorazine had been used in surgical procedures peri-operatively as an anti-nausea medication in France. Patients were noted to be less anxious and calmer. This observation eventually led Deniker to try chlorpromazine with patients who had schizophrenia, where he observed notable improvement in symptoms.

The pharmaceutical company Smith-Kline had purchased the chlorpromazine rights from Rhone-Poulenc in France and had been marketing it as an anti-nausea medication. After Deniker's observations, they sought and received FDA approval in 1954 to market Thorazine for the treatment of schizophrenia.

During the Second World War, Deniker and Professor Pasteur Vallery-Radot took an active part in French Resistance. In 1943, they enrolled one hundred young medical students of Paris to make a Center of First Aid Workers. They wore military uniforms and took care of the civilian population after the bombing of towns by the Germans. They also treated people returning from Germany, especially the deportees and the prisoners of war.
