= Pierre Janet =

French physician and psychologist (1859–1947)

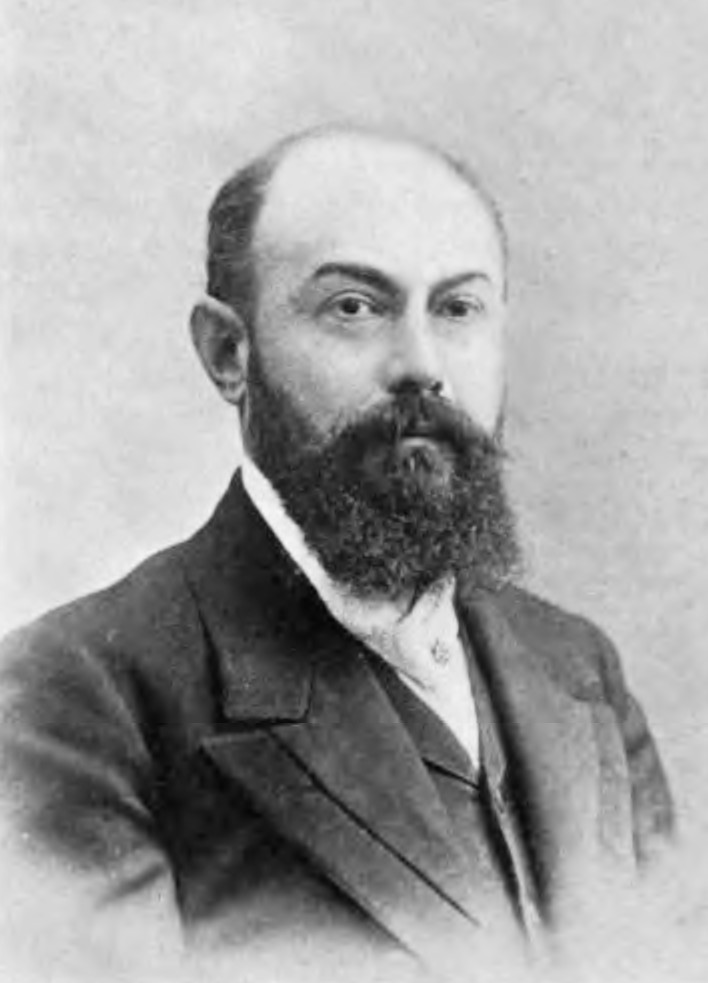
- Born: Pierre Marie Félix Janet; 30 May 1859; Paris, French Empire
- Died: 24 February 1947 (aged 87); Paris, France
- Education: École Normale Supérieure (B.A., 1882); University of Paris (Ph.D. 1889; M.D., 1893)
- Known for: Dissociation; Psychological automatism Psychasthenia
- Scientific career
- Fields: Psychology, philosophy, psychiatry
- Workplaces: Collège de France (1902–1934); University of Paris (1898–1902); Salpêtrière Hospital (1890–1910)
- Doctoral advisor: Jean-Martin Charcot (M.D. advisor)
- Doctoral students: Jean Delay

Pierre Marie Félix Janet (/ʒɑːˈneɪ/ zhah-NAY; French: [pjɛʁ ʒanɛ]; 30 May 1859 – 24 February 1947) was a pioneering French psychologist, physician, philosopher, and psychotherapist in the field of dissociation and traumatic memory.

He is ranked alongside William James and Wilhelm Wundt as one of the founding fathers of psychology. He was the first to introduce the link between past experiences and present-day disturbances and was noted for his studies involving induced somnambulism.

== Biography ==
Janet studied under Jean-Martin Charcot at the Psychological Laboratory in the Salpêtrière Hospital in Paris. He first published the results of his research in his philosophy thesis in 1889 and in his medical thesis, L'état mental des hystériques, in 1892. He earned a medical doctorate the following year after completing a study on the mental state of hysterics.

In 1898, Janet was appointed lecturer in psychology at the Sorbonne. In 1901, he founded the French Psychological Society and a year later he attained the chair of experimental and comparative psychology at the Collège de France, a position he held until 1936. He was a member of the Institut de France from 1913, and was a central figure in French psychology in the first half of the 20th century. He was elected an international honorary member of the American Academy of Arts and Sciences in 1932, a member of the United States National Academy of Sciences in 1938, and an international member of the American Philosophical Society in 1940.

Pierre was the nephew of Paul Janet.

== Theories ==
Janet was one of the first people to allege a connection between events in a subject's past life and their present-day trauma, and coined the words "dissociation" and "subconscious". His study of the "magnetic passion" or "rapport" between the patient and the hypnotist anticipated later accounts of the transference phenomenon.

The 20th century saw Janet developing a grand model of the mind in terms of levels of energy, efficiency and social competence, which he set out in publications including Obsessions and Psychasthenia (1903) and From Anguish to Ecstasy (1926), among others. In its concern for the construction of the personality in social terms, this model has been compared to the social behaviorism of George Herbert Mead something which explains Lacan's early praise of "Janet, who demonstrated so admirably the signification of feelings of persecution as phenomenological moments in social behaviour".

=== Developmental hierarchy ===
Janet established a developmental model of the mind in terms of a hierarchy of nine "tendencies" of increasingly complex organisational levels.

He detailed four "lower tendencies", rising from the "reflexive" to the "elementary intellectual"; two "middle tendencies", involving language and the social world; and three "higher tendencies", the "rational-ergotic" world of work, and the "experimental and progressive tendencies".

According to Janet, neurosis could be seen as a failure to integrate, or a regression to earlier tendencies, and he defined subconsciousness as "an act which has kept an inferior form amidst acts of a higher level". Janet also introduced the concept of idee fixe during his research and dialogues with patients. Here, the subconscious, is considered the root of all hysterical manifestations. It constitutes the nucleus of the second state of personality, which he called as etat second.

== Influence on depth psychology ==
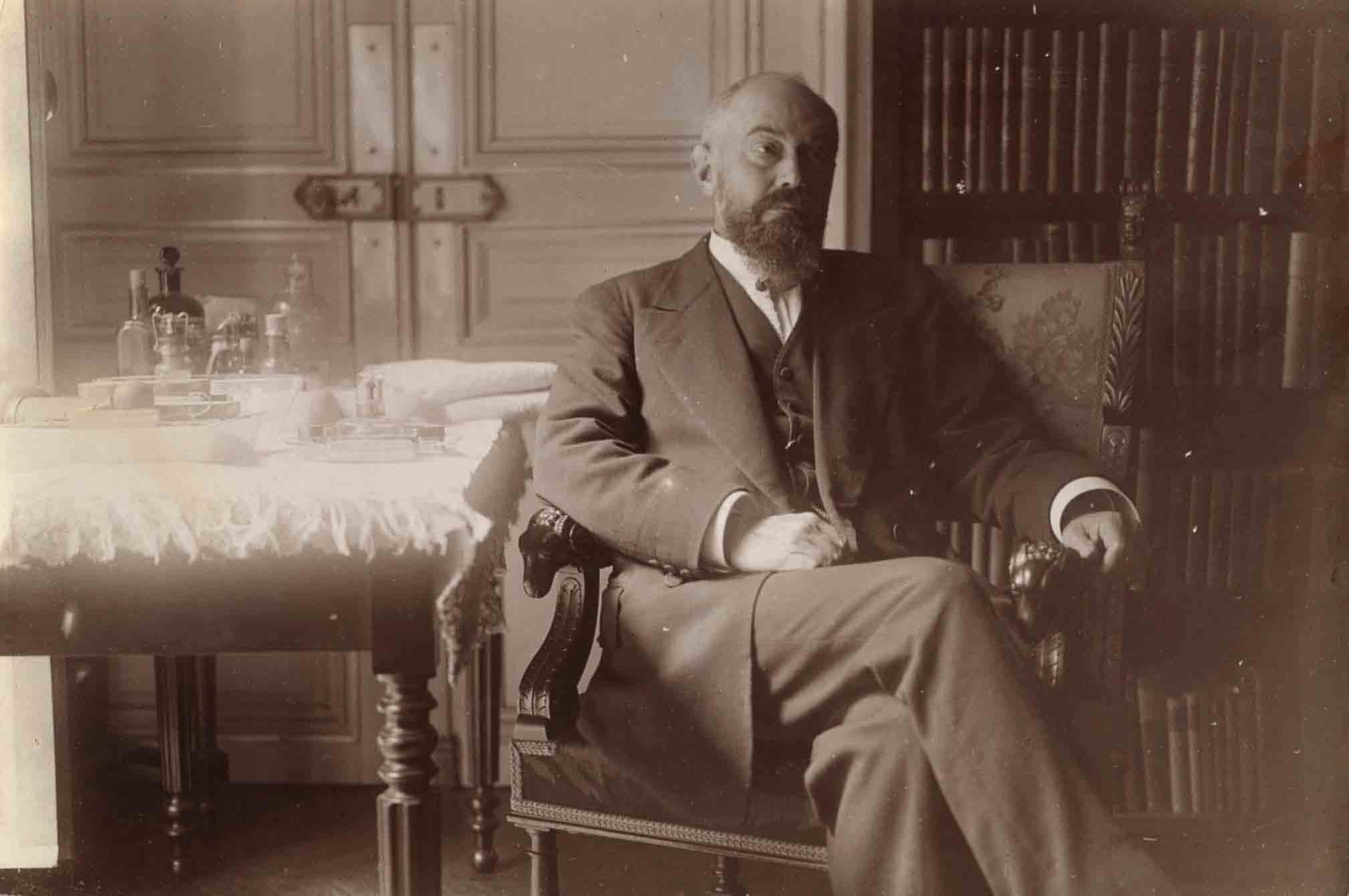
Pierre Janet, by Dornac

=== William James ===
In his 1890 essay The Hidden Self, William James wrote of P. Janet's observations of "hysterical somnambulist" patients at Havre Hospital, detailed in Janet's 1889 doctorate of letters thesis, De l'Automatisme Psychologique. James made note of various aspects of automatism and the apparent multiple personalities ("two selves") of patients variously exhibiting "trances, subconscious states" or alcoholic delirium tremens. James was apparently fascinated by these manifestations and said, "How far the splitting of the mind into separate conciousnesses may obtain in each one of us is a problem. P. Janet holds that it is only possible where there is an abnormal weakness, and consequently a defect of unifying or coordinating power."

=== Freud ===
Controversy over whose ideas came first, Janet's or Sigmund Freud's, emerged at the 1913 Congress of Medicine in London. Prior to that date, Freud had freely acknowledged his debt to Janet, particularly in his work with Josef Breuer, writing for example of "the theory of hysterical phenomena first put forward by P. Janet and elaborated by Breuer and myself". He stated further that "we followed his example when we took the splitting of the mind and dissociation of the personality as the centre of our position", but he was also careful to point out where "the difference lies between our view and Janet's".

Writing in 1911 of the neurotic's withdrawal from reality, Freud stated: "Nor could a fact like this escape the observation of Pierre Janet; he spoke of a loss of 'the function of reality'", and as late as 1930, Freud drew on Janet's expression "psychological poverty" in his work on civilisation.

However, in his report on psychoanalysis in 1913, Janet argued that many of the novel terms of psychoanalysis were only old concepts renamed, even down to the way in which his own "psychological analysis" preceded Freud's "psychoanalysis". This provoked angry attacks from Freud's followers, and thereafter Freud's own attitude towards Janet cooled. In his lectures of 1915-16, Freud said that "for a long time I was prepared to give Janet very great credit for throwing light on neurotic symptoms, because he regarded them as expressions of idées inconscientes which dominated the patients". However, after what Freud saw as his backpedalling in 1913, he said, "I think he has unnecessarily forfeited much credit".

The charge of plagiarism stung Freud especially. In his autobiographical sketch of 1925, he denied firmly that he had plagiarized Janet, and as late as 1937, he refused to meet Janet on the grounds that "when the libel was spread by French writers that I had listened to his lectures and stolen his ideas he could with a word have put an end to such talk" but did not.

A balanced judgement might be that Janet's ideas, as published, did indeed form part of Freud's starting point, but that Freud subsequently developed them substantively in his own fashion.

=== Jung ===
Carl Jung studied with Janet in Paris in 1902 and was much influenced by him, for example equating what he called a complex with Janet's idée fixe subconsciente.

Jung's view of the mind as "consisting of an indefinite, because unknown, number of complexes or fragmentary personalities" built upon what Janet in Psychological Automatism called "simultaneous psychological existences".

Jung wrote of the debt owed to "Janet for a deeper and more exact knowledge of hysterical symptoms", and talked of "the achievements of Janet, Flournoy, Freud and others" in exploring the unconscious.

=== Adler ===
Alfred Adler openly derived his inferiority complex concept from Janet's Sentiment d'incomplétude, and the two men cited each other's work on the issue in their writings.

== Publications ==
- Janet, Pierre (1893). Contribution à l'étude des accidents mentaux chez les hystériques (Doctoral thesis).

In 1923, Janet wrote a definitive text on suggestion, La médecine psychologique, and in 1928-32 published several definitive papers on memory. His two-volume Obsessions et la psychastenie also proposed more than 60 different kinds of obsessions.

While Janet did not publish much in English, the 15 lectures that he gave at Harvard Medical School between 15 October and the end of November 1906 were published in 1907 as The Major Symptoms of Hysteria. He received an honorary doctorate from Harvard University in 1936.

Of his great synthesis of human psychology, Henri Ellenberger wrote that "this requires about twenty books and several dozen of articles".

== See also ==
- Alfred Binet
- Henri Bergson
- Henri Ey
- Henri Piéron
- Jean Piaget
- Josiah Royce
- Loevinger's stages of ego development
