= Claude Delay =

Psychoanalyst and writer

- Born: 22 December 1934 (age 91); Neuilly-sur-Seine, France
- Occupation: Psychoanalyst • Writer
- Parent(s): Jean Delay; Marie-Madeleine Delay
- Relatives: Florence Delay (sister)

Claude Delay (born 22 December 1934) is a psychoanalyst and writer. She is also the author of several biographies of Coco Chanel, the Russian poet Marina Tsvetaeva and the brothers Alberto and Diego Giacometti. The granddaughter of the surgeon and politician Maurice Delay, she is the daughter of professor Jean Delay and the sister of the novelist Florence Delay of the Académie française.

== Biography ==
=== Hands ===
Claude Delay has published some of her texts under the name of Claude Baillén or Claude Delay-Tubiana, Professor Raoul Tubiana, surgeon of the hand, being her husband.

In the biography written by Claude Delay, Giacometti, Alberto and Diego, l'histoire cachée, Raoul Tubiana intervenes in the last chapter to evoke Alberto Giacometti, whom he met in 1948 thanks to their common friend Jacques Audiberti, Before getting to know Diego. For his part, Claude Delay met Diego later.

On the occasion of the marriage of Raoul Tubiana and Claude Delay in 1972, Diego offered them "a bronze couple holding hands". For his part, Raúl Tubiana possessed a hand carved by Alberto; Diego then carved a hand of Claude Delay. "This is how we have bronze hands of the two brothers," says Raul Tubiana.

== Works ==
=== Novels and memoires ===
- Paradis noir, novel, Gallimard
- Le Hammam, novel, Gallimard, prix Lucien Tisserant
- Roger la grenouille, portrait-souvenir, Jean-Jacques Pauvert
- Les ouragans sont lents, novel, Éditions des Femmes
- Passage des Singes, éditions des Femmes, prix littéraire de Trente Millions d'amis

=== Biographs ===
- 1993: Chanel solitaire, Gallimard; J'ai Lu, 2001
- 1997: Marina Tsvetaïeva, Une ferveur tragique, Plon, prix Anna de Noailles of the Académie française
- 2007: Giacometti, Alberto et Diego, L'histoire cachée, Fayard
- 1998: Zao Wou-Ki, Couleurs et mots, collections of interviews with Zao Wou-Ki and several authors, Éditions Le Cherche-Midi
- 2013: Marilyn Monroe, la cicatrice, Fayard
