= Hugo Santiago =

Argentine film director (1939–2018)

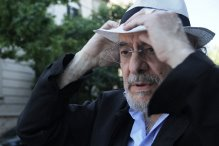
Hugo Santiago Muchnick

Hugo Santiago Muchnick (12 December 1939 – 27 February 2018) was an Argentine film director.

== Biography ==
Born in Buenos Aires, Argentina and lived in France from 1959 until his death in 2018.

Santiago studied literature, Philosophy and Music. From 1959 to 1966 he was assistant director to Robert Bresson. In 1969, he made his first feature film Invasión in his native Argentina based on an idea by celebrated writers Adolfo Bioy Casares and Jorge Luis Borges, who also co-wrote the script. Adolfo Bioy Casares described the film in May 1969 as follows:

"Invasión modernises the theme of The Iliad: it does not praise the shrewdness and effectiveness of the conqueror, but rather the courage of a handful of warriors ready to defend their Troy-which is far too much like Buenos Aires-where there is always a group of friends and a tango inviting you to fight for just and noble causes. Homer will forgive me: the heart is always on the side of those who resist. I believe Hugo Santiago has created an extraordinary film".

This was followed by another collaboration with the famed writers Les Autres in 1974. In 1979 he made Écoute voir... with Catherine Deneuve cast as a female detective investigating a gang looking to control people using radio waves. He returned to Argentina with Les Trottoirs de Saturne a reflection on his own exile in 1986. Prior to his feature film Le Loup de la côte Ouest (2002), a stylish detective thriller, he directed theatrical adaptations for the screen of Sophocles (Électre), Bertolt Brecht (La Vie de Galilée) and the Opera by Iannis Xenakis (La Geste gibelline).

Prior to directing in 1961 he was a choreographer and metteur en scene for Histoire du Soldat at the Stravinsky Festival. He has supported the work of other filmmakers over the years, including producing Sérail / Surreal Estate by Eduardo de Gregorio (1976) and narrating Raúl Ruiz's Les Trois couronnes du matelot (1983). He also appeared in Ruiz's short film Colloque de chiens in 1977.

== Death ==
Santiago died on 27 February 2018 at the age of 78 in Paris.

== Filmography ==
- Invasión / Invasion (Argentina, 1969)
- Les Autres / The Others (France, 1974)
- Écoute voir / See Here My Love (France, 1979)
- Les Trottoirs de Saturne / The Sidewalks of Saturn (France/Argentina, 1986)
- Électre (France, 1987) TV
- La Geste gibelline (France/Argentina, 1988)
- La Vie de Galilée (France, 1992) TV
- Le Loup de la côte Ouest / The Wolf of the West Coast (France / Portugal / Argentina, 2002)
- El Cielo Del Centauro (2015)

Short Films:

- Los Contrabandistas (Buenos Aires, 1967)
- Los Taitas (Buenos Aires, 1968)
