= CRB =

CRB or CrB may refer to:

== Organisations ==
- Centre de Recherche Berbère
- Chabab Riadhi Belouizdad, an Algerian football team
- Clinical Research Bureau, the first birth control clinic in the United States
- Clube de Regatas Brasil, a Brazilian football team
- Commission for Relief in Belgium
- Contract Recognition Board, in motor racing
- Copyright Royalty Board, US
- Country Roads Board, Victoria, Australia, 1913–1983
- Criminal Records Bureau, UK, later Disclosure and Barring Service

== Other uses ==
- Canada Recovery Benefit, an income support program between 2020 and 2021
- Central Railway Building, in Bangladesh
- Chris Robinson Brotherhood, US band
- Claremont Review of Books, a political journal
- Coconut Rhinoceros Beetle, an invasive species from Southeast Asia
- Collarenebri Airport, IATA airport code "CRB"
- Corona Borealis constellation, CrB
- Cramér–Rao bound, in statistics
- Refinitiv/CoreCommodity CRB Index, of commodity futures
