= Brahim Akhiat =

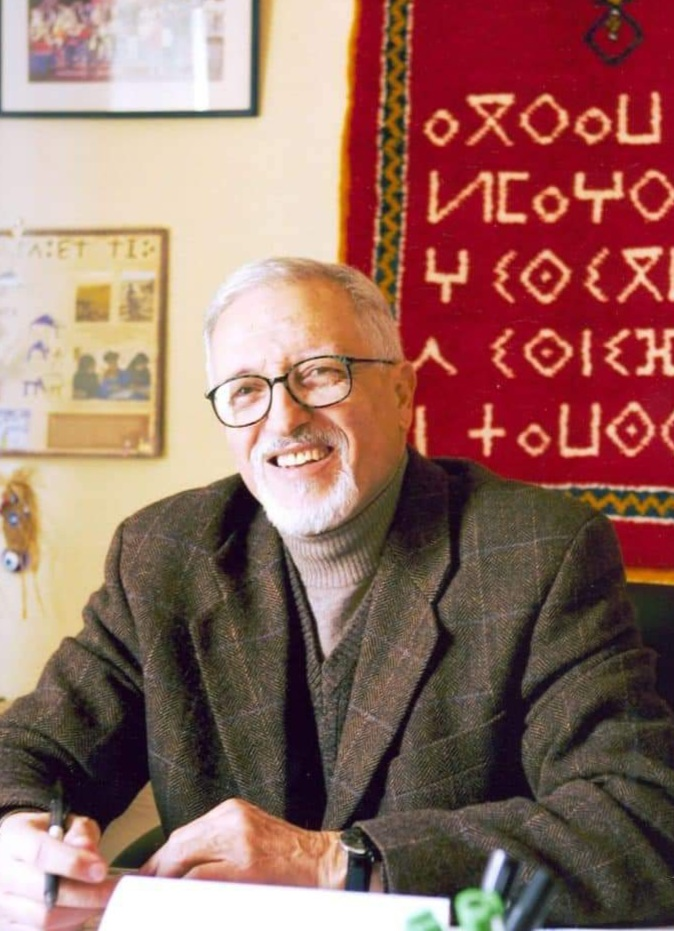
- Born: 1941; Akhiaten, Chtouka Aït Baha Province, Souss-Massa, Morocco
- Died: 7 February 2018 (aged 77)
- Occupations: Author, activist

Brahim Akhiat (c. 1941 – 7 February 2018) was a Moroccan author and poet, and a Berber activist.

== Early life ==
Brahim Akhiat was born in 1941 in Akhiaten, Morocco.

== Career ==
Akhiat began his career as a mathematics teacher in Kenitra and Rabat. Meanwhile, he became an Amazigh, or Berber, activist. In Rabat in 1967 he co-founded the Association marocaine de recherches et d'échanges culturelles, an Amazigh cultural organization which rose to prominence, alongside Abdellah Bounfour, Ahmed Akouaou, Omar El Khalfaoui and Ali El Jaoui. He served as its secretary general until his death. He joined the board of the Royal Institute of the Amazigh Culture in 2002.

Akhiat was the author of four books. He wrote both prose and poetry in Arabic and in French. His main theme was the relationship between Berber culture and Moroccan national identity. He was also the editor-in-chief of Amud and Tamunt. A conference was held in his honor near Kenitra in 2009.

== Death ==
Akhiat died on 7 February 2018.

== Selected works ==
- Akhiat, Brahim (1992). Tabrate.
- Akhiat, Brahim (1994). Pourquoi l'amazighité ?.
- Akhiat, Brahim (2004). Les hommes de l'action amazighe aujourd'hui décédés.
- Akhiat, Brahim (2007). l'amazighité notre identité nationale.
