= Nafissatou =

Nafissatou is a feminine given name. Notable people with the name include:

- Nafissatou Dia Diouf (born 1973), Senegalese writer in French
- Nafissatou Diallo, maid at the centre of the New York v. Strauss-Kahn case
- Nafissatou Niang Diallo (1941–1982), Senegalese writer
- Nafissatou Thiam (born 1994), Belgian track and field athlete
