= Germaine Kouméalo Anaté =

Togolese politician and writer

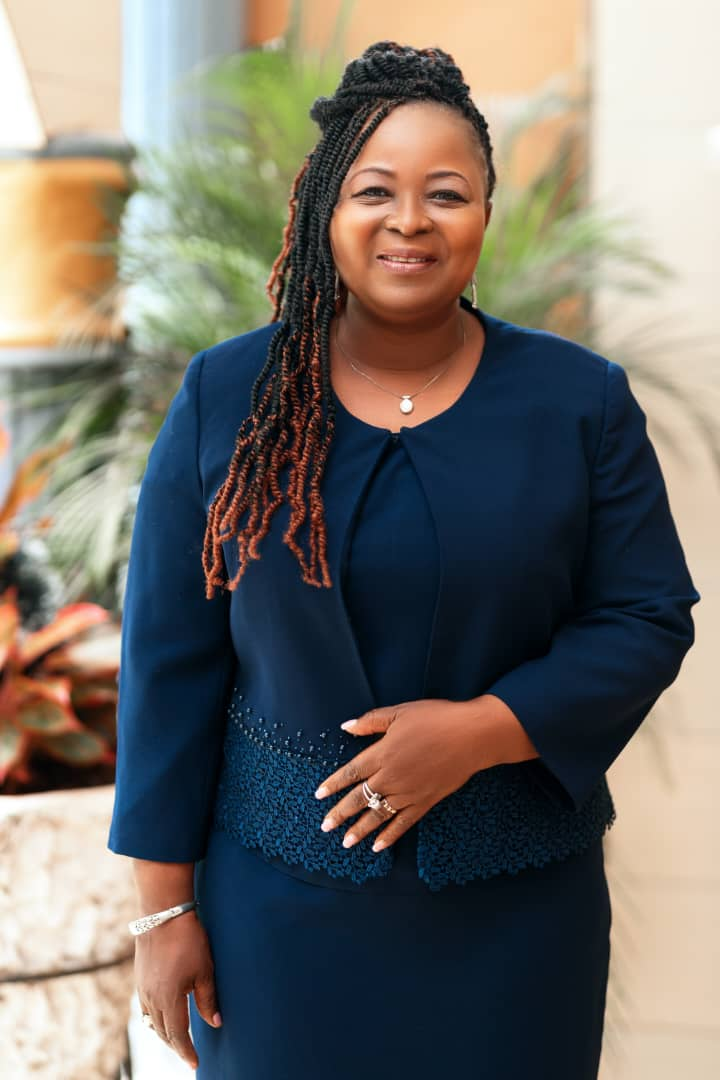
- Born: June 15, 1968 (age 58); Kazaboua, Sotouboua
- Education: University of Bordeaux III
- Occupations: Politician, Scholar, Writer, Lecturer

Germaine Kouméalo Anaté (born June 15, 1968 in Kazaboua, in Sotouboua Prefecture) is a Togolese government minister, scholar and writer. On 17 September 2013, she was appointed Minister of Communication, Culture, Arts and Civic Education in the government of Kwesi Ahoomey-Zunu1. She held the position of Chief of Staff of the Ministry of Higher Education and Research of Togo before being promoted to minister. The holder of a doctorate in Information Science and Communication at the University of Bordeaux III in France, she is a lecturer and research professor in this field at the universities of Lomé and Kara. Anaté' is the President of the Writers' Association of Togo and is author of several books.
