= Ben Hoffman (disambiguation) =

Benjamin or Ben Hoffman may refer to:

- Ben Hoffman (born 1974), American country musician known as "Wheeler Walker Jr."
- Ben Hoffman (triathlete) (born 1983), American triathlete
- Benjamin Hoffman (1864–1922), American judge and lawyer

== See also ==
- Benjamin Hoffmann (born 1985), French creative writer and professor
