= Community of universities and higher education institutions of Aquitaine =

The community of universities and higher education institutions of Aquitaine (CUEA, French: Communauté d'universités et établissements d'Aquitaine) is an association of universities and higher education institutions (ComUE) for higher education institutions in the Aquitaine region of France, including the city of Bordeaux.

== History ==
Groupings of higher education institutions in the Bordeaux area date back at least to 1997 with the creation of a "pôle universitaire de Bordeaux". In 2007 under the auspices of a 2006 law creating Pôle de recherche et d'enseignement supérieur the PRES Université de Bordeaux was organized, grouping the 4 Bordeaux universities and several technical schools under one coordinating association.

With the 2013 Law on Higher Education and Research (France) discontinuing PRES and establishing a new associative form in the association of universities and higher education institutions (ComUE), the 2007 Université de Bordeaux was replaced by CUEA (which formally began 11 March 2015). Meanwhile, on 1 January 2014, a new University of Bordeaux had been organized by merging again three of the Bordeaux universities.

== Members ==
The founding members of the CUEA are:

- University of Bordeaux,
- Bordeaux Montaigne University
- University of Pau and Pays de l'Adour
- Bordeaux INP
- Institut d'études politiques de Bordeaux
- Bordeaux Sciences Agro

Associate members are:

- Centre hospitalier universitaire de Bordeaux,
- Institut Bergonié (Centre régional de lutte contre le cancer),
- CROUS de Bordeaux Aquitaine,
- Centre national de la recherche scientifique,
- École nationale supérieure d'architecture et de paysage de Bordeaux,
- KEDGE Business School,
- École supérieure des technologies industrielles avancées (ESTIA),
- École nationale de la magistrature,
- École nationale supérieure d'arts et métiers - centre de Bordeaux (ENSAM),
- École des beaux-arts de Bordeaux.
