= Benjamin Hoffmann =

French creative writer and professor

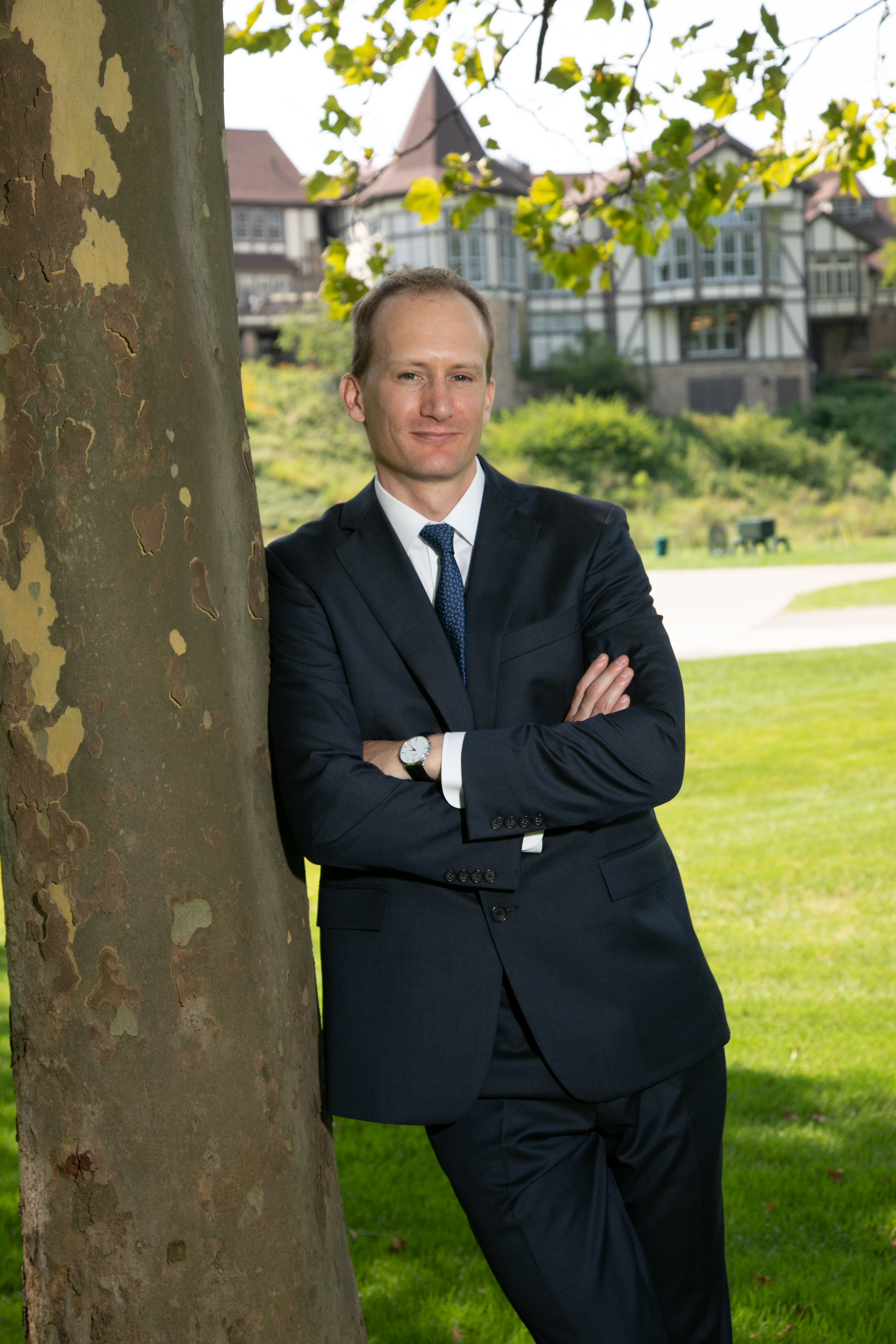
- Hoffmann in 2021
- Born: 13 November 1985 (age 40); Villeurbanne, France
- Education: Yale University (PhD) Sorbonne University (MA) University of Bordeaux (BA)
- Occupations: Novelist, Professor
- Writing career
- Language: French, English
- Genres: Novel, essays

Benjamin Hoffmann (born 13 November 1985) is a French creative writer and professor at Ohio State University in Columbus, Ohio. He's the author of novels and essays published in France and the United States. He specializes in the literature and culture of eighteenth-century France, and is the author of books and articles on transatlantic studies, the introduction of Buddhism in the West, and literary theory.

== Biography ==
Born in France in 1985, Benjamin Hoffmann studied literature and philosophy at the University of Bordeaux, Sorbonne University, and the École Normale Supérieure in Paris. His first book, Le monde est beau on peut y voyager, was published in 2008 by Éditions Bastingage. In 2009, he became language assistant in the department of French at Amherst College. The sudden death of his father, Patrick Hoffmann, was the topic of his next book, Père et fils, published in 2011 by Éditions Gallimard. Also in 2011, he published his second novel, Anya Ivanovna with Éditions Bastingage. In 2015, he earned a Ph.D. from Yale University after finishing a dissertation dedicated to the representations of North America in eighteenth-century French Literature. He is currently Professor at The Ohio State University, where he teaches early modern French literature and creative writing.

=== Awards ===
Hoffmann received the Best PhD Dissertation Award ("Marguerite A. Peyre Prize") from the Department of French at Yale University in 2015. He also received a scholarship for academic excellence from the Sorbonne, and a Fellowship from the Whiting Foundation. He was elected a Fellow of the Royal Historical Society in 2025.

== Books ==
- La Guerre des os, novel, Paris, Éditions Denoël, coll. Romans français, 2026
- Je suis Murakami, novella, Paris, Éditions Zone Critique, coll. Vrilles, 2025
- Les Minuscules, novel, Paris, Éditions Gallimard, coll. Blanche, 2024 ISBN 978-2-07-302502-9
- L'Île de la Sentinelle, novel, Paris, Éditions Gallimard, coll. Blanche, 2022 ISBN 978-2-07-293395-0
- Les Paradoxes de la postérité, monograph, Éditions de Minuit, coll. Paradoxe, 2019, ISBN 978-2-707-34503-5
- L'Amérique posthume, monograph, Éditions Classiques Garnier, coll. L'Europe des Lumières, 2019 ISBN 978-2-406-07822-7
- Lezay-Marnésia, Lettres écrites des rives de l'Ohio, critical edition, Éditions Classiques Garnier, coll. Americana, 2019 ISBN 978-2-406-07825-8
- American Pandemonium, novel, Paris, Éditions Gallimard, coll. L'Arpenteur, 2016 ISBN 978-2-07-014227-9
- Père et fils, Paris, Éditions Gallimard, coll. L'Arpenteur, 2011 ISBN 978-2-07-013332-1
- Anya Ivanovna, novel, Bordeaux, Éditions Bastingage, 2011 ISBN 978-2-35060-023-9
- Le monde est beau on peut y voyager, novel, Bordeaux, Éditions Bastingage, 2008 ISBN 978-2350600161

== Books in English ==
- Sentinel Island, translated by Alan J. Singerman, Liverpool UP, 2024 ISBN 978-1-837-642618
- The Paradoxes of Posterity, translated by Alan J. Singerman, Penn State UP, 2020 ISBN 978-0-271-087030
- Posthumous America, translated by Alan J. Singerman, Penn State UP, 2018 ISBN 978-0-271-08007-9
- Lezay-Marnésia, Letters Written from the Banks of the Ohio, translated by Alan J. Singerman, Penn State UP, 2017 ISBN 978-0-271-07716-1
