= Abdellah Bounfour =

Moroccan linguist and philologist

- Born: 1946 (age 79–80)

Academic background
- Education: University of Paris III: Sorbonne Nouvelle
- Thesis: L'Amarg, poésie berbère des Igliwa (1984)
- Doctoral advisor: André Miquel

Academic work
- Discipline: Linguist
- Sub-discipline: Berber studies
- Institutions: Mohammed V University; Bordeaux Montaigne University

Abdellah Bounfour (born 1946) is a Moroccan linguist and philologist specialized in Berber languages, literature and culture. He is an Emeritus University Professor at Institut national des langues et civilisations orientales (INALCO) in Paris.

== Biography ==
Bounfour was born in 1946, a native of the Glaoua, a Berber tribe of the High Atlas of Marrakesh. He studied at the University of Paris III: Sorbonne Nouvelle, where he received his Doctorat de troisième cycle in 1976 and a Doctorat d'Etat in 1984. His advisor was André Miquel and his thesis was entitled "L'Amarg, poésie berbère des Igliwa". He got the agrégation of Arabic in 1986. He worked as a Maître de conférences at the Mohammed V University in Rabat from 1976 to 1984, serving as head of the Department of French Language and Literature from 1979 to 1981 and curator of the library of the Faculty of Arts of Rabat from 1981 to 1983. Then from 1987 to 1997, as a Maître de conférences at the Bordeaux Montaigne University. He is the Director of LACNAD (Langues et Cultures du Nord de l'Afrique et Diasporas) and LACNAD-CRB (Centre de Recherche Berbère) since January 2010. He has been a member of the Encyclopédie berbère Editorial Board since 2002 at the invitation of Salem Chaker.

== Notable works ==
- Poésie populaire berbère. Textes recueillis par A. Roux, transcrits, traduits et annotés par A. Bounfour. Paris: Editions du CNRS. 1990. ISBN 9782222043904.
- Le nœud de la langue. Langue, littérature et société au Maghreb. Aix-en-Provence: Edisud. 1994. ISBN 9782857447429.
- De l'enfant au fils. Essai sur la filiation dans les Mille et une nuits. Leiden: Brill. 1995. ISBN 9789004101661.
- Chaker, Salem; Bounfour, Abdellah (1996). Langue et littérature berbères. L'Harmattan. ISBN 978-2-7384-4217-8.
- Introduction à la littérature berbère: 1. La poésie. Louvain/Paris: Peeters. 1999. ISBN 9789042907317.
- Baumgardt, Ursula; Bounfour, Abdellah (2000). Panorama des littératures africaines. État des lieux et perspectives. Paris: L'Harmattan/Inalco. ISBN 9782738488664.
- Bounfour, Abdallah; Boumalk, Abdallah (2001). Vocabulaire usuel du tachelhit: tachelhit-français. Centre Tarik ibn Zyad. ISBN 978-9954-0-2289-4.
- Introduction à la littérature berbère: 2. Le récit hagiologique. Louvain/Paris: Peeters. 2005. ISBN 9789042915879.
- Bounfour, Abdallah; Ameziane, Amar; El Adak, Mustapha (2010). Anthologie de la poésie berbère traditionnelle. Harmattan. ISBN 978-2-296-13073-9.
- Subjectivités marocaines du présent. Rabat: Editions Ghani. 2011.
- Malaise dans la transmission: La crise de l'autorité familiale, scolaire et politique au Maghreb. Editions L'Harmattan. 2016. ISBN 978-2-14-001719-3.
- Introduction a la litterature berbere: 3. Le conte merveilleux. Louvain Paris Bristol, CT: Peeters. 2018. ISBN 978-90-429-3295-1.
