= ESTIA Institute of Technology =

Engineering College in Bidart, France

Coordinates: 43°26′32″N 1°33′32″W

École supérieure des technologies industrielles avancées
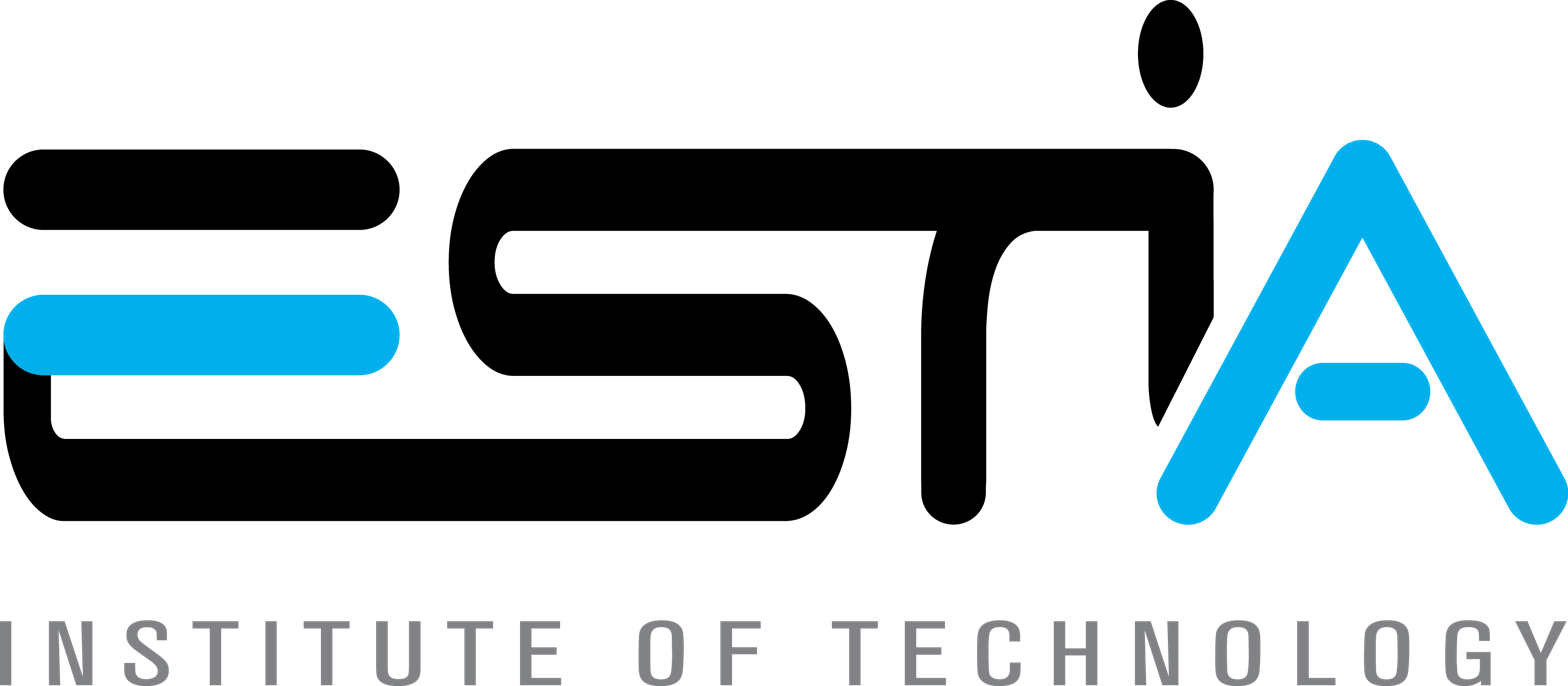
- Motto: "Job opportunities all over the world"
- Type: Public
- Established: 1985 - (creation); 1995 - gained Commission des Titres d'Ingénieur status
- Budget: €12M (en 2015)
- President: Patxi Elissalde
- Academic staff: 45
- Students: 1100 (2025)
- Location: Bidart, France
- Campus: Bidart
- Website: http://www.estia.fr

ESTIA, (French: École Supérieure des Technologies Industrielles Avancées), translated as "Institute of Advanced Industrial Technologies", an engineering school based in Bidart, accredited by the Commission des Titres d'Ingénieur (CTI) and a member of the Conférence des Grandes écoles (CGE). Founded by the Bayonne-Basque Country Chamber of Commerce and Industry, it has been offering an international trilingual programme in French, English and Spanish since 1996.

It is also a member of the ISAE Group, a founding member of the EU4Dual European University, and committed to a sustainable development approach recognised by the DD&RS label.

== Presentation ==
ESTIA is based on a partnership with universities both in France (the University of Bordeaux) and abroad (the United Kingdom, Spain, etc.). The ESTIA campus offers:

- an ESTIA engineering degree programme, as well as specialist courses: a preparatory engineering cycle, an international a preparatory engineering cycle in Spanish, a Bachelor’s degree of engineering, Master’s degrees / specialised Master’s degrees / Master of Science degrees, executive education, accreditation of prior learning, and PhDs.
- 7 technical platforms supporting businesses : Compositadour, Addimadour, Turbolab, EneRGEA, PEPSS, CETIA, DATALAB.
- an incubator for start-ups and a business incubator, 170 businesses established, 20 years in operation, 4 technical platforms and 2 sites on the Basque Coast.

== Trainings ==
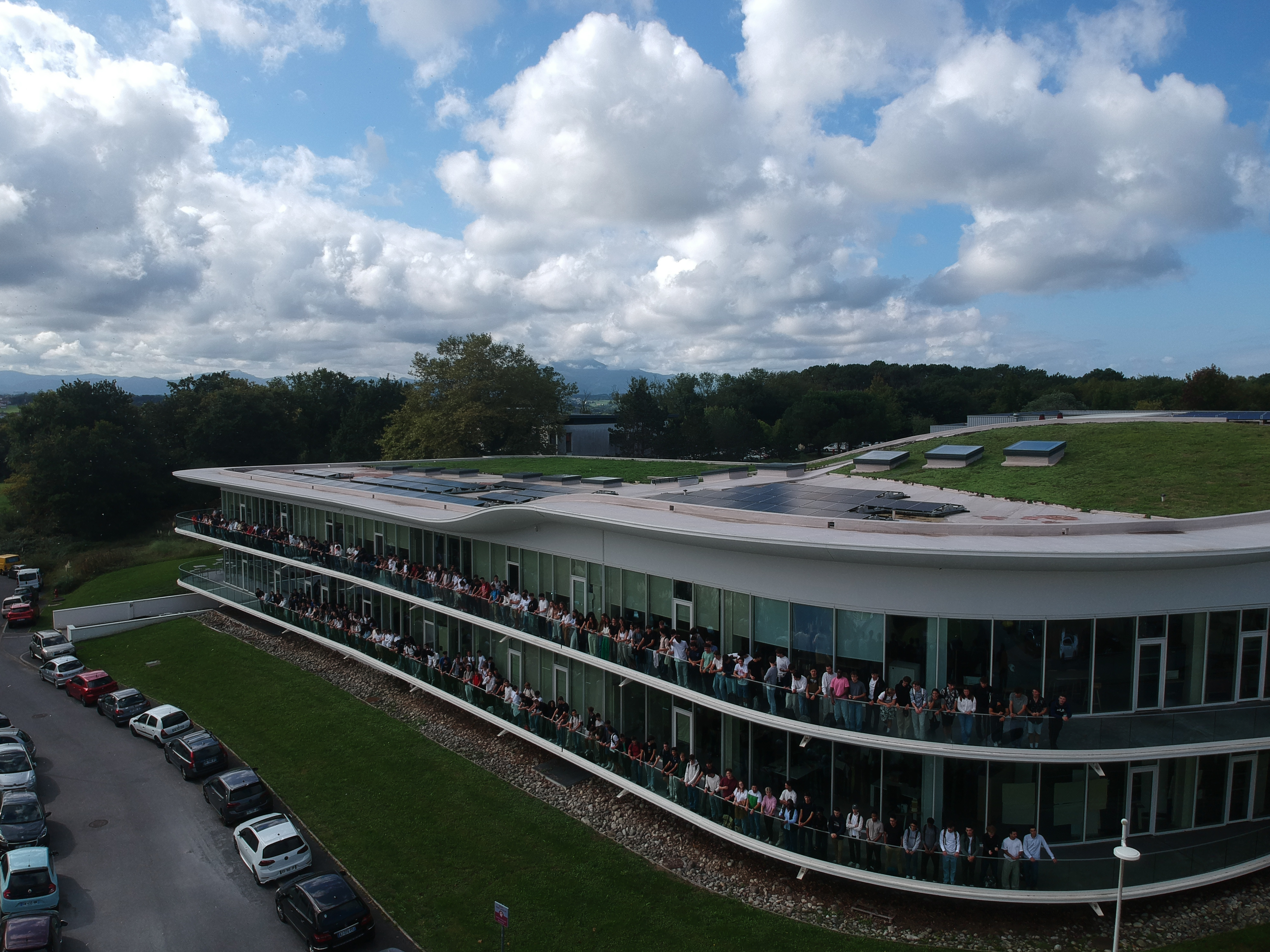
ESTIA's 1st year students back to school in the 2025-26 academic year.jpg

=== International Generalist Engineer dual degree course ===
ESTIA offers a three-year programme to train trilingual general engineers capable of working in roles related to design offices, production, process engineering or project management. The programme covers several technical fields, including computer science, mechanical engineering, energy and electronics, with teaching delivered in French, English and Spanish.

In addition to full-time student status, students can choose to follow their course through an apprenticeship, and it offers the opportunity to pursue a dual degree with an international partner university. In the third year, students choose a specialisation, including digital engineering, innovation, robotics, embedded systems, industrial engineering or smart grids.

=== European Master’s degrees (5 years of higher education) ===
All ESTIA engineering students work towards a Master of Science or a European Master’s degree in partnership with various foreign universities, depending on the specialisation they have chosen, whilst studying for their degree. A five-week placement is undertaken in the third year at the relevant university. Students who have completed the first or second year of a Master’s degree may also enrol on these programmes. The Master of Science programmes are as follows:

- ‘Software techniques for CAE’, in partnership with Cranfield University, for the CAE or SENS specialisations;
- ‘Advanced technology management’, in partnership with the University of Wolverhampton, for the PROVE specialisation;
- ‘Robotics and Automation’, with the University of Salford, for the ROBIL option;
- ‘Embedded Systems’, with the University of Salford, for the ROBIL option.

The other European Master’s programmes are:

- ‘Project Management and Innovation’, in partnership with the University of Mondragón, for the PROLIDER specialisation;
- ‘Industrial Organisation and Management’, in partnership with the Bilbao School of Engineering, for the STRATO specialisation;
- ‘Control in Smart Grids and Distribution Generation’, in partnership with the San Sebastián University, for the SGRIDS specialisation.

=== Bachelor’s degree of engineering ===
ESTIA offers a three-year Bachelor’s degree in engineering, accredited by the Commission des titres d’ingénieur (CTI) and leading to a Bachelor’s degree. The programme focuses on mechatronics, industrial engineering and technologies for the factory of the future. It is aimed in particular at students with a technological baccalaureate, those with a general baccalaureate who have followed a scientific specialisation, and holders of a BTS in scientific and technological fields.

Since 2025, ESTIA has been offering work-study specialisations from the third year onwards, particularly in the fields of design and industrial robotics.

=== Preparatory engineering cycle ===
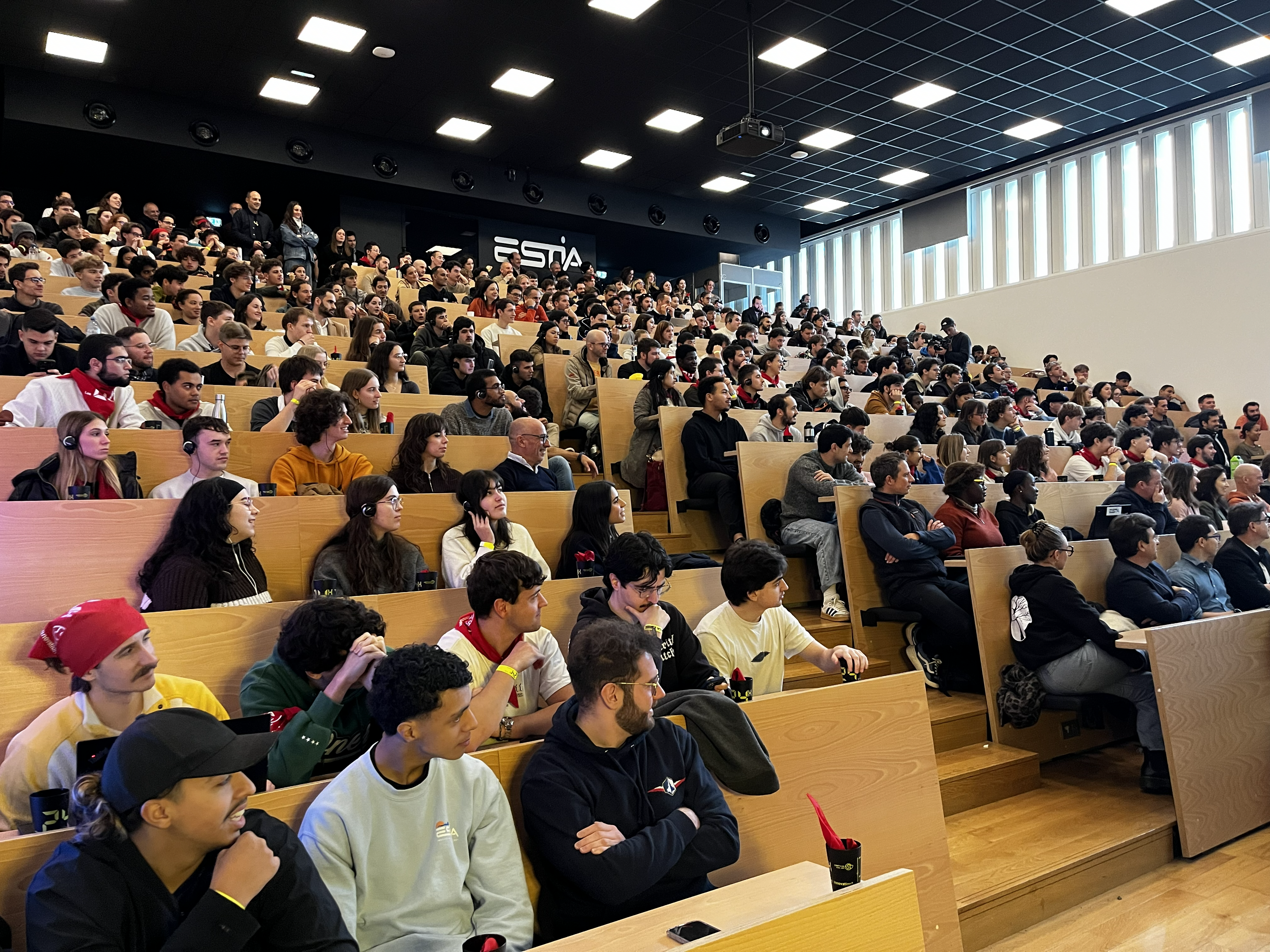
Estia's main amphitheater during 24h hour of innovative activity

ESTIA offers a two-year preparatory engineering course, open to students who have completed their A-levels, which prepares them for entry into the international general engineering program. This course enables students to acquire the scientific, technical and methodological foundations necessary to pursue further studies at an engineering school. At the end of the two years, students may join ESTIA’s engineering program, subject to validation of European Credit Transfer and Accumulation System (ECTS) credits.

The school also offers a preparatory engineering course with an international specialisation in Spanish, combining scientific and technical studies with immersion in the Spanish language. This course is aimed in particular at students with an international background or who speak Spanish, and also prepares them for entry into the international general engineering program.

ESTIA is also affiliated with the Bordeaux Preparatory Programme, which is held on the University of Bordeaux campus in Talence. Students join ESTIA in Bidart at the end of the two-year CPBx programme to begin the engineering course.

== International relations ==
ESTIA emphasises through trilingual teaching in French, English and Spanish, Student exchange programs and dual degrees with partner universities. The international general engineering program enables students to pursue, alongside their ESTIA engineering degree, a second master’s-level qualification at a partner institution. The school states that it offers 18 European dual degree programmes and has 45 academic mobility agreements.

ESTIA is also a founding member of the European University EU4Dual, a European alliance dedicated to the development of dual studies and integrated training at European level.

== Student life ==
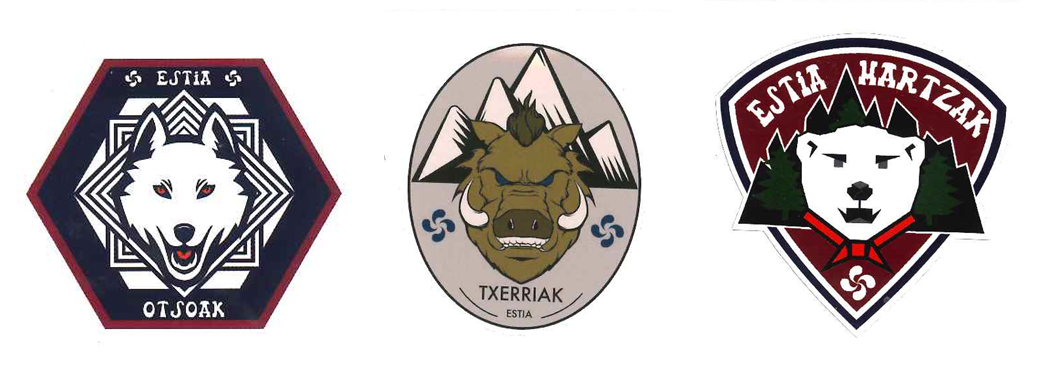
Examples of totems from ESTIA student groups

Student life at ESTIA is organised around a network of student societies and clubs, covering a range of activities including sport, culture, the arts, humanitarian work, environmental issues, entrepreneurship and technology. The campus is home to a students’ union, an arts office, a sports association and several specialist clubs. The school also has a student welfare and student life service, dedicated to monitoring students’ wellbeing and academic success, and supporting student societies.

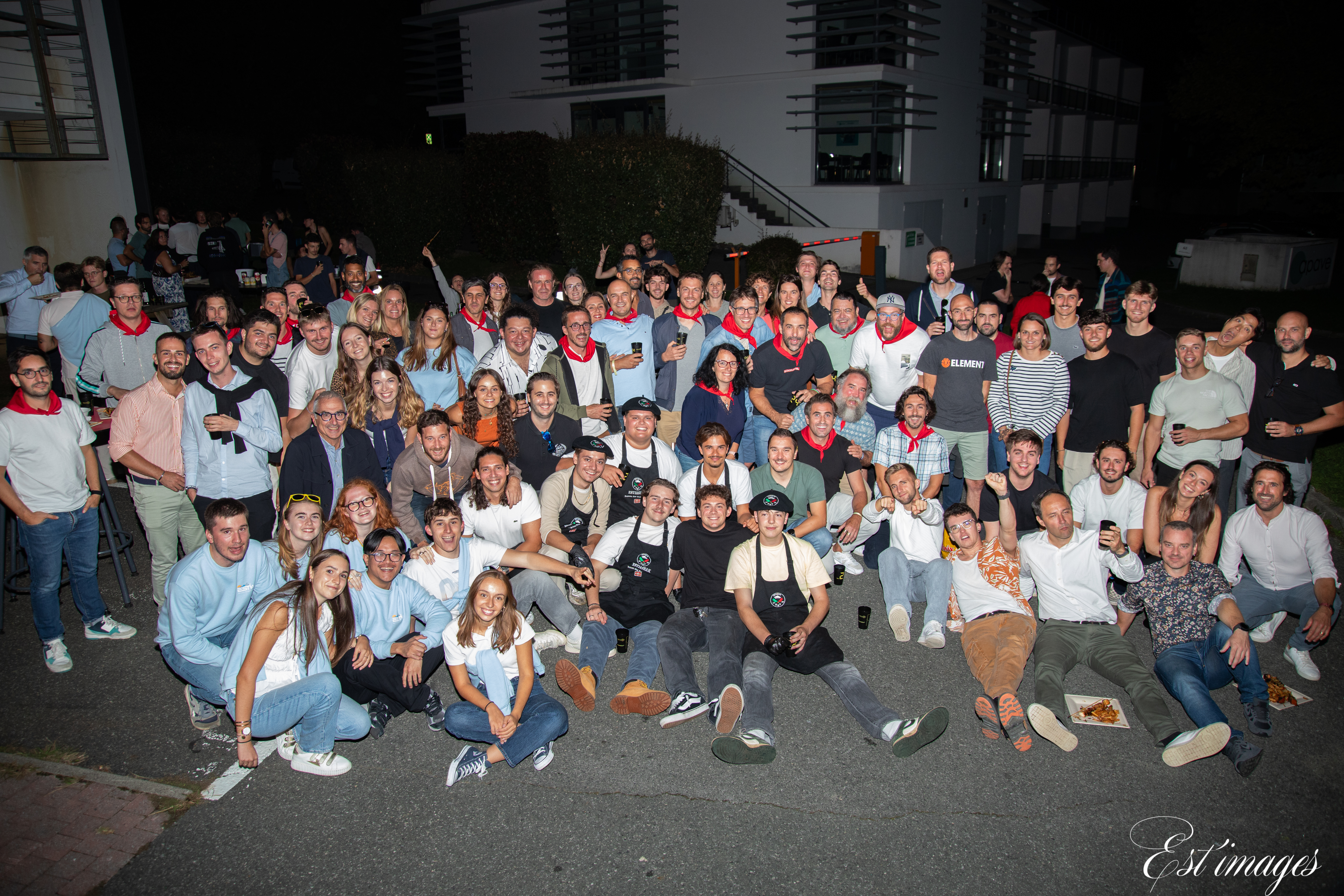
Student's celeberating "Back to school" in 2025.
