= Julie Okoh =

Nigerian playwright and academic

Juliana Omonukpon Omoifo Okoh
- Born: Ubiaja, Edo, Nigeria
- Occupations: A Nigerian playwright, Educator and feminist activist
- Years active: 2004–2017 (Served as a professor of theatre theory at the University of Port Harcourt)
- Spouse: Joseph Donatus Okoh
- Education: Loyola University Chicago

Juliana (Julie) Omonukpon Omoifo Okoh (born Ubiaja, 5 August 1947) is a Nigerian playwright, educator and feminist activist who was professor of theatre theory at the University of Port Harcourt from 2004 to 2017. Dealing with issues concerning women in society, her plays include The Mannequins (1997), Edewede (2000) and Closed Doors (2007). She was a Fulbright Scholar and in 2011 she received a Lifetime Achievement Award from the Society of Nigerian Theatre Artists (SONTA)

== Biography ==
Born in Ubiaja in Nigeria's southerly Edo State, Juliana Omonukpon Omoifo is the daughter of Augustine Azamuoisa Omoifo, a teacher and court clerk, and his wife, a seamstress and store manager. Brought up in a modest household, she was the fifth in a family of eight children. Both her parents were culturally active; her father loved music and played the guitar while her mother was a traditional story teller who took part in Ikhio dance-drama performances. She is married to Joseph Donatus Okoh (born 1941), a professor specializing in education at the University of Port Harcourt. They have four children.

After completing her primary education in Ubiaja, Juliana Omoifo attended Our Lady of Lourdes Secondary School in Uromi. She then found a job with the Ministry of External Affairs in Lagos where she took GCE examinations at ordinary and advanced level. Due to her outstanding results, she was able to attend a three-year course in training as a bilingual secretary at the Federal Training Centre. In 1972, she was granted admission to Loyola University Chicago where she graduated in French and English Literature in 1976. She went on to earn a master's degree in French Literature from the University of Alberta (1979). She later attended the University of Bordeaux III to study French and English Theatre, earning a master's degree in 1989 and a PhD in 1991.

In 2000 and 2001, Okoh was in the United States where she was a Fulbright fellow at Smith College, taking on assignments as a guest lecturer at North Carolina State University and the University of Massachusetts at Amherst. In 2004, she embarked on a lengthy career as professor of theatre theory and criticism at the University of Port Harcourt.

Julie Okoh retired in 2017.

In her inaugural lecture titled "Towards Feminist Theatre in Nigeria", which she presented in October 2012, Okoh concludes:

The concept of gender equality that focuses on women's rights has come a long way, and feminist literature has played a major role in bringing about changes in the attitude towards women. Yet, a long battle still lies ahead, for it will take a long time for gender equality and the role of women in society to be well understood and accepted in the ideal sense... As for me, I have chosen the medium of the theatre as my pulpit for that purpose. I have tried to reach out to the world with my theatre practice based on feminist principles and techniques.

== Publications ==
Okoh has written and directed over 30 plays, many of which have been published, as well as critical essays and articles in both French and English on theatre, cultural and gender issues. Okoh's work overview was 21 works in 25 publications which were in 1 language and stored in 145 library holdings.

One of her most successful plays is Edewede which was first performed at the University of Port Harcourt in 1998. It is aimed at convincing Nigerian women that excision is a tradition which should be avoided, presenting it as a harmful practice. The play includes traditional women's dances and songs, sometimes subversively. Using a lengthy sex strike as a device, the women vote to ban excision. Excision is also the theme of In the Fullness of Time, in which the audience is encouraged to participate in voting or in singing and clapping.

Her plays include:

- 1997: Mask: A Play for Schools and Colleges
- 1997: The Mannequins
- 2000: Edewede: The Dawn of a New Day
- 2000: In the Fullness of Time
- 2002: Who Can Fight the Gods?
- 2005: Aisha
- 2007: Closed Doors
- 2008: The Trials
- 2009: A Haunting Past: Drama
- 2010: Our Wife Forever: Drama
- 2014: Cry for Democracy
- 2018: Thorny Path

== Awards ==
Okoh has been awarded numerous scholarships and awards. They include:

- 2000: Senior Fulbright Scholar
- 2011: Lifetime Achievement Award from the Society of Nigerian Theatre Artists (SONTA)

== Writings about Julie Okoh's work ==
- Abah, Okwute J. "Prognosis for the Nigerian University System in The 21st Century: A Study of Julie Okoh's Who can Fight the Gods? and Ojo Rasak Bakare's Once Upon a Tower." Nigerian universities in the 21st century: issues and perspectives 1 (2007): 135ff.
- Amaefula, Rowland Chukwuemeka."Constructing Femininity through Female Genital Mutilation: An Ambivalent Discourse on Okoh's Edewede." Ikoro 7.2 (2017):42-54.
- Asen, Rosemary. "CORRUPTION IN THE NIGERIAN SOCIETY: LESSONS FROM JULIE OKOH’S WHO CAN FIGHT THE GODS." Journal of the Arts/Humanities Volume 1, no. 1 (2018).
- Asen, Rosemary. "Sexual Exploitation and Gender Inequality: Lessons from Okoh’s The Mannequins (1997)." Hybrid Journal of Literary and Cultural Studies 2, no. 3 (2020): 27–36.
- Asiegbu, Nkechi. "The Role of Women in the Subjugation of Women: The Old Women in Julie Okoh’s Selected Plays." The Crab: Journal of Theatre and Media Arts 9 (2014): 33–47.
- Ejiofor, B. Asodionye. "Widowhood Levirate Rites and The Politics of Choice in Julie Okoh’s Our Wife Forever." AFRREV IJAH: An International Journal of Arts and Humanities 8, no. 2 (2019): 60–70.
- Ifeanyichukwu, Frank. "Cultural Negligence as Key Cause of Terrorism in Nigeria: A Study of Julie Okoh's We Are Rivers." Development 9, no. 1 (2019).
- Imo, Edward Egbo. "The “Chauvinistic” Men of Julie Okoh: Victims of Feminist Bias." Journal of Gender and Power 10, no. 2 (2018): 53-71.
- Iyav, Ben Due. Marxist Aesthetics and Marxist Feminist Aesthetics in Selected Plays of Olu Obafemi and Julie Okoh. PhD diss., 2014.
- Nutsukpo, Margaret Fafa. 2020. Women, protest and social change in Julie Okoh’s Edewede. AFRREV LALIGENS: An International Journal of Language, Literature and Gender Studies 9.1:28-40.
- Nwafor, Friday. "Drama as a Tool for the Campaign against Female Genital Mutilation: Juliana Okoh’s Edewede as a Paradigm." African Research Review 13, no. 1 (2019): 86–92.
- Ojediran, Oludolapo. "Exploration of the Women Folk Challenges in Julie Okoh's The Mannequins." (2017).
- Okolocha, H. Oby, and Sophia I. Akhuemokhan. Women's Human Rights Violations: Transformative Processes in Julie Okoh's Edewede and Stella Dia Oyedepo's Brain Has No Gender. Rupkatha Journal on Interdisciplinary Studies in Humanities 4, no. 2 (2012).
- Ojediran, Oludolapo. "Female circumcision: Inexpressiveness and loss in Julie Okoh’s Edewede." In Gender and Development in Africa and Its Diaspora, pp. 49–55. Routledge, 2018.
- Yeseibo, John Ebimobowei. "Towards a feminist theatre in Nigeria: Julie Okoh’s Closed Doors examined." Journal of Gender and Power 10, no. 2 (2018): 9-24.
