= Stéphane Bijoux =

French politician (born 1970)

Stéphane Bijoux MEP
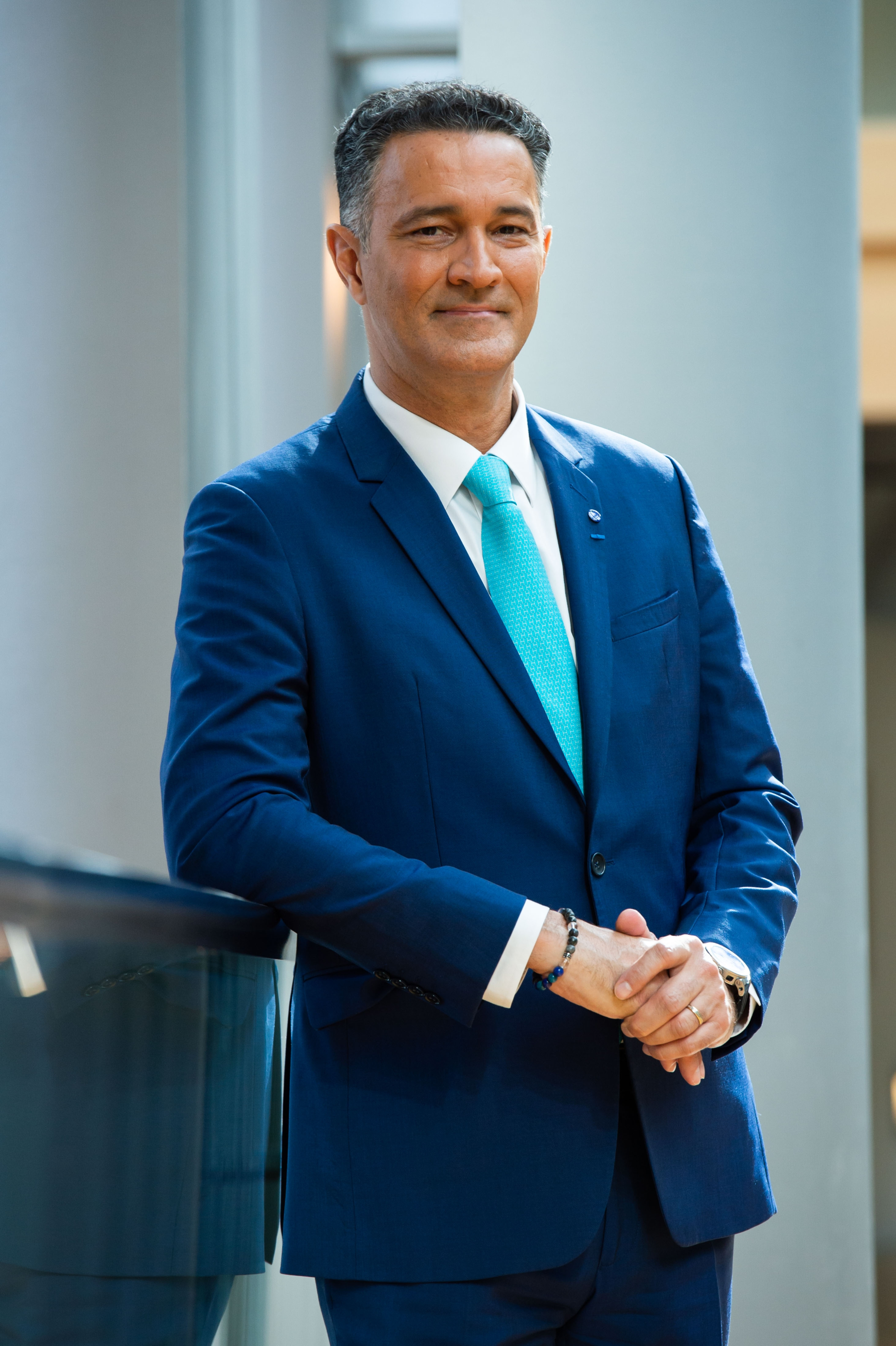

Member of the European Parliament for France
- In office 2 July 2019 – 15 July 2024

Personal details
- Born: 8 October 1970 (age 55) Saint-Denis, France
- Party: LREM
- Education: Bordeaux Montaigne University
- Profession: Journalist

Stéphane Bijoux (born 8 October 1970) is a French politician who served as a Member of the European Parliament from 2019 to 2024.

== Early life and education ==
Bijoux is a journalist from Réunion. He has been director of television editorials Overseas (La Première, France Ô) and responsible for diversity in the Information at France Télévisions.

== Member of the European Parliament ==
As Member of the European Parliament, Bijoux served on the Committee on Regional Development. In addition to his committee assignments, he was part of the European Parliament Intergroup on Climate Change, Biodiversity and Sustainable Development, the European Parliament Intergroup on Seas, Rivers, Islands and Coastal Areas and the MEPs Against Cancer group.
