= Roger Naslain =

French chemist

Roger Naslain

Prof. Roger R. Naslain (born 20 November 1936) is a French chemical and physical scientist. He has been a professor at the University of Bordeaux 1 since 1969.

Professor Naslain received his master's degree in chemical and physical sciences from the University of Rennes and his doctoral degree in chemistry from the University of Bordeaux. He then did a postdoctoral work at the General Electric R&D Center. Dr. Naslain is the author or co-author of more than 300 papers, co-author of 17 patents, and editor or co-editor of eight books on composite materials and four special issues of scientific journals devoted to ceramic-matrix composites.

He was the first Director of the Institute for Composite Materials (IMC), an organization created to promote technology transfer from the aerospace industry to small companies and to deliver continuing education in the field of composites. Professor Naslain was for 15 years the Director of the Laboratory for Thermostructural Composites (LCTS), which was established to conduct fundamental and applied research on ceramic-matrix composites. The research at the LCTS focuses on ceramic fibers, the interphase/interface, processing, mechanical behavior, and environmental effects.

== Subsequent work ==
Professor Naslain and his colleagues designed and experimentally validated the chemical vapor infiltration (CVI) process, a technique to manufacture large parts from C/SiC and SiC/SiC composites for aerospace applications. In 1977, he and his team were probably the first to manufacture a ceramic matric composite. Both the Société Européenne de Propulsion (now Safran Ceramics) in Bordeaux and the DuPont Company in Wilmington, Delaware (now General Electric), employ this approach. Dr. Naslain's other research interests include synthesis and crystal chemistry of alkali metal borides, crystal chemistry of boron-rich borides, and interfacial phenomena in metal-matrix or ceramic-matrix composites.

== Awards and honours ==
Dr. Naslain is a member of the editorial board of Composites Sciences and Technology and a member of various international academies and scientific committees. He is Officer in the order of Légion d'Honneur and in that of Palmes Académiques.

- 1991 - Medal of Excellence in Composite Materials, delivered by the Center for Composite Materials
- 2000 - International Ceramics Prize 2000, Class: Basic Research, delivered by the World Academy of Ceramics
- 2004 - Distinguished Lifemember of the American Ceramic Society
