= Hélène Velasco-Graciet =

French academic

Hélène Velasco-Graciet is a French professor of geography and was the president of the Bordeaux Montaigne University from 2016 to 2020.

In 2021, Hélène Velasco-Graciet was appointed president of the Fondation Maison des Sciences de l'Homme (FMSH) in Paris.

Velascho-Graciet's work has touched on geography, borders, and culture.

In 2020, Velasco-Graciet was covered in the news as part of the Bordeaux Montaigne University's suspension of all travel to China during the COVID-19 pandemic.
