= Bordeaux Montaigne University =

Public university in Pessac, France

Coordinates: 44°47′43″N 0°36′59″W

- Université Bordeaux Montaigne
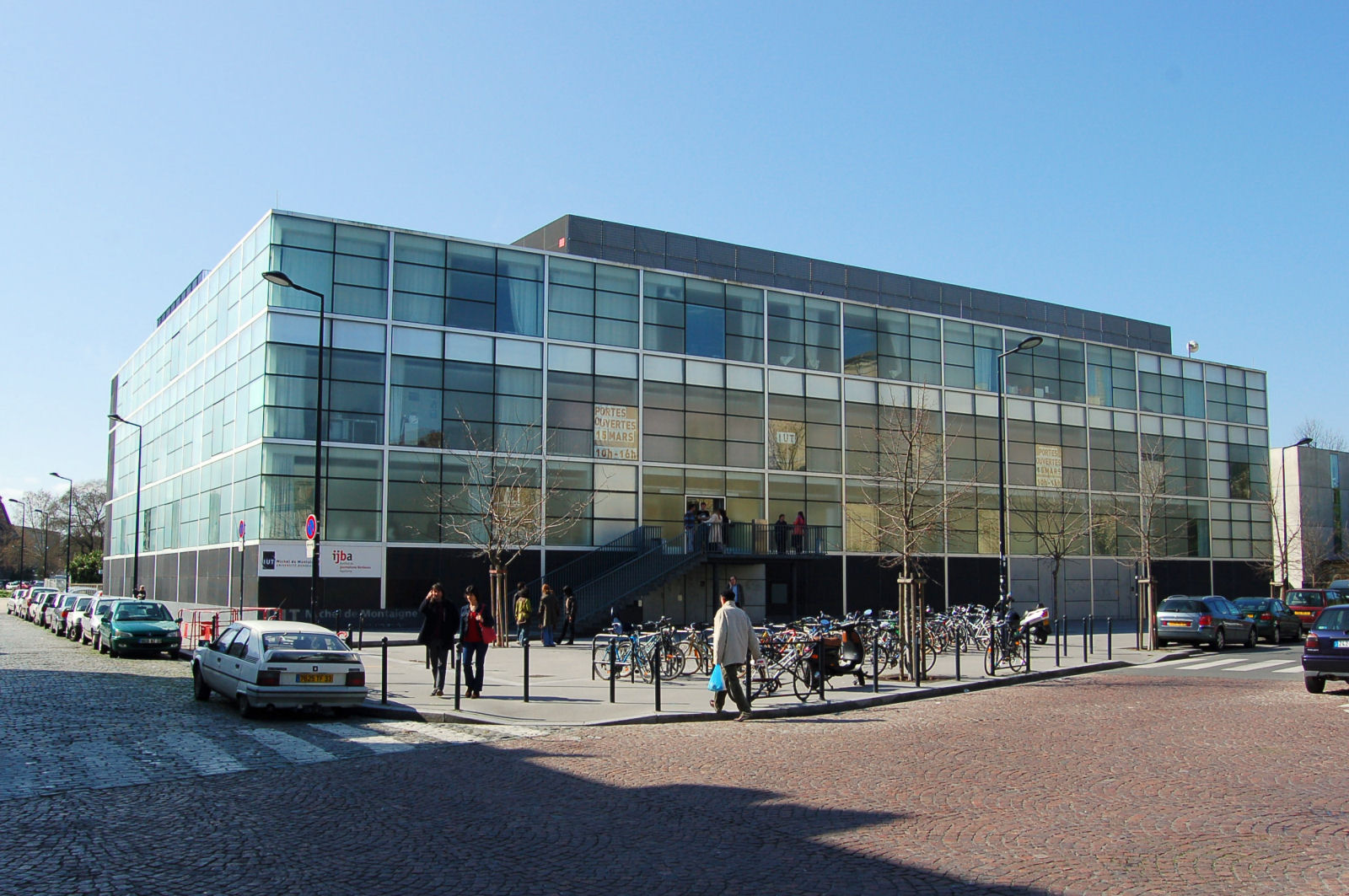
- Bordeaux Aquitaine Journalism Institute
- Former names: Université Michel de Montaigne Bordeaux 3
- Type: Public
- Established: 1970
- Affiliations: AUF, ComUE d'Aquitaine, EUA
- Budget: €99 million
- President: Alexandre Péraud
- Academic staff: 1,258 including 707 professors & researchers
- Students: 18,137
- Location: Pessac, Gironde, Nouvelle-Aquitaine, France
- Campus: Suburban
- Website: u-bordeaux-montaigne.fr

Bordeaux Montaigne University (French: Université Bordeaux Montaigne, pronounced [ynivɛʁsite bɔʁdo mɔ̃tɛɲ]; formerly Université Michel de Montaigne Bordeaux 3) is a public university in Pessac, France, approximately 8 kilometres (5 miles) southwest of the city centre of Bordeaux.

It forms part of the ComUE d'Aquitaine university group.

== History ==
Bordeaux Montaigne University was established in 1970 after a restructuring of public universities in and near the city of Bordeaux. The university was known as Université de Bordeaux 3 during its first two decades. In 1990, it took on the name of philosopher Michel de Montaigne who was a native of the modern-day Nouvelle-Aquitaine region, becoming Université Michel de Montaigne Bordeaux 3. In 2014, the university's name was simplified to Université Bordeaux Montaigne after the universities of Bordeaux 1, 2, and 4 were all merged to become the University of Bordeaux. Bordeaux Montaigne University celebrated its 50th anniversary in 2020.

== Curricula and syllabi ==
The university provides bachelors, vocational bachelors, masters, and doctoral degrees in the arts, linguistics, management and humanities, abiding by the European Bologna process, and thus complying with the European Credit Transfer System. The university conducts substantial research in all of these disciplines.

Bordeaux Montaigne University also offers certificates such as DAEU and DUT.

A double-degree (for example in Law and Languages) is possible with the Montesquieu University or other Bordeaux Higher Education Institutes.

Evening classes in additional languages or in rarer languages (cantonese, etc.) are also available.

== Faculties, Schools and Doctoral College ==
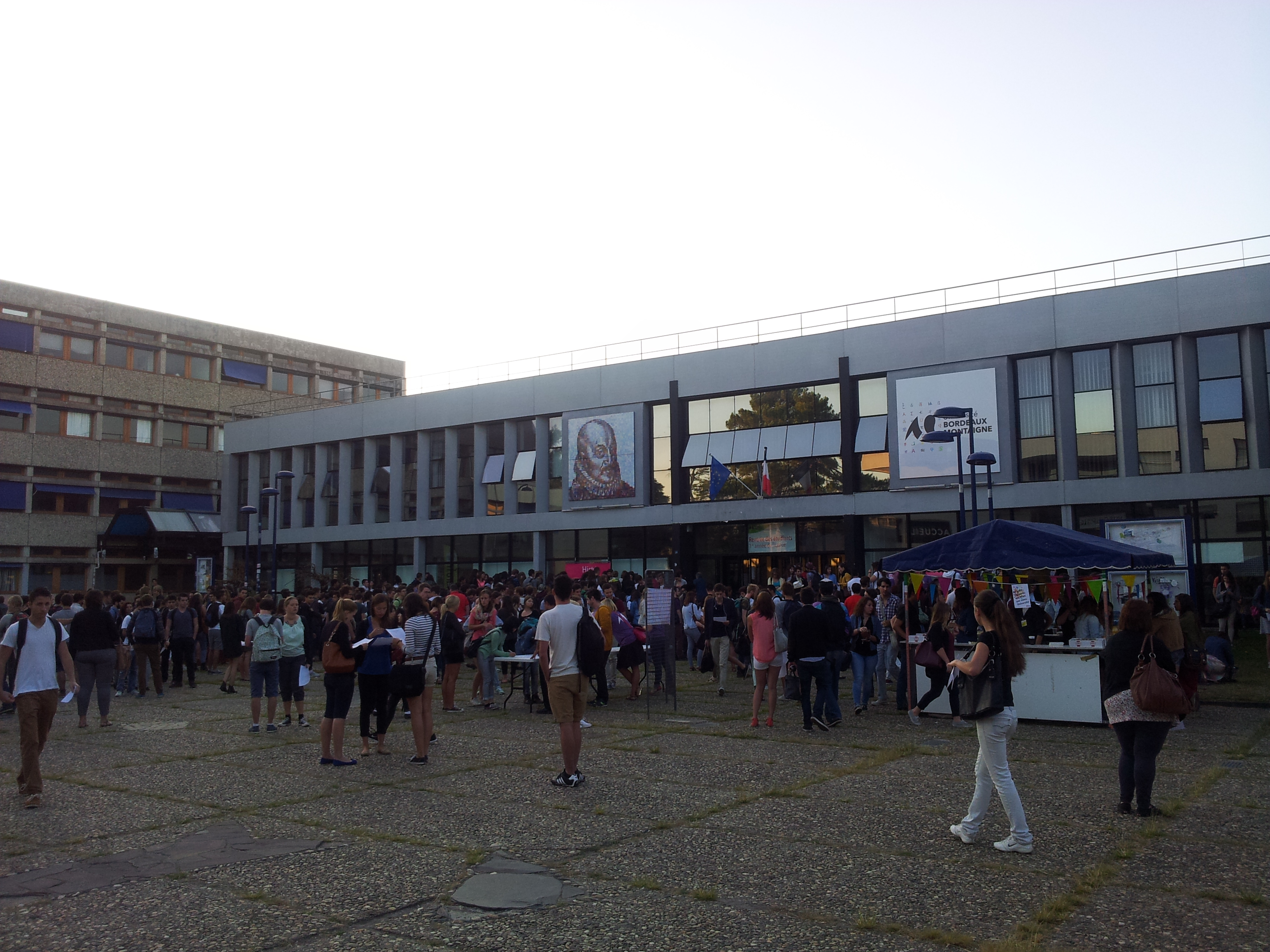
New student orientation on the Pessac campus

The Doctoral College Montaigne-Humanités (literally: "Montaigne Humanities" is the largest doctoral college on the Bordeaux Universities campus and one of the largest in France. It is also referred to as Ecole doctorale "unique" (literally: Sole Doctoral College), as it is an conglomerate of several research fields and other doctoral colleges in humanities, which were once apart.

== Campus and student life ==
Bordeaux Montaigne University conducts most of its teaching and research on the campus in Pessac. However, the journalism and technology institutes are located in the city centre of Bordeaux, and there are small teaching sites located in the towns of Agen and Bayonne.

The university has several CROUS residence halls, dining halls, and cafés available to students. There is also a student union on the Pessac campus and numerous student organisations that students may join, including a sports association.

International students comprise 8 percent of the student body.

== Notable faculty ==
- Robert Escarpit (1918–2000) - specialist in English literature
- Joseph Pérez (1931–2020) - historian specialising in Spanish history
- Jean-Claude Golvin (born 1942) - archaeologist and architect
- Abdellah Bounfour (born 1946) - Moroccan linguist and philologist specialised in Berber languages, literature and culture.
- Béatrice Galinon-Mélénec (born 1949) - semiotician specialising in the anthropology of communication
- Hélène Velasco-Graciet - geographer; president of the Bordeaux Montaigne University from 2016 to 2020
- Emmanuel Bourdieu (born 1965) - writer, playwright, film director and philosopher; son of Pierre Bourdieu

== Notable alumni ==
- Pascale Sardin (born 1971) French feminist writer, Samuel Beckett, gender studies and translation scolar.
- Lucien Xavier Michel-Andrianarahinjaka (1929–1997) - Malagasy writer, poet, and politician
- Ignacio Ramonet (born 1943) - Spanish academic, journalist and writer; editor-in-chief of Le Monde diplomatique 1991–2008
- Julie Okoh (born 1947) - Nigerian playwright, educator and feminist activist
- François Bayrou (born 1951) - Prime Minister of France
- Gong Yuanxing (born 1952) - Chinese diplomat
- Rodolphe Alexandre (born 1953) - politician from Guyane (French Guiana)
- Ioannis Liritzis (born 1953) - Greek academic
- Alice Yaeger Kaplan (born 1954) - American literary critic, translator, historian, and educator
- Simplice Sarandji (born 1955) - former Prime Minister of Central African Republic
- Mohamed Toihiri (born 1955) - Permanent Representative to the United Nations for Comoros
- Stéphan Perreau (born 1969) - contemporary musician and art historian
- Stéphane Bijoux (born 1970) - politician
- Nafissatou Dia Diouf (born 1973) - Senegalese writer
- Yann Barthès (born 1974) - journalist, TV presenter and producer
- Éric Poulliat (born 1974) - politician
- Celia Ross - former president of Algoma University, Canada
- Benoît Maire (born 1978) - visual artist who works in film, sculpture, painting, photography, collage, and performance art
- Marzena Sowa (born 1979) - cartoonist from Poland
- Aimal Faizi (born 1979) - Afghan journalist and columnist; spokesperson of Afghanistan's President Hamid Karzai 2011–2014
- Marlyse Baptista - linguist specialising in morphology, syntax, pidgin and creole languages
- Fabien Gay (born 1984) - politician
- Benjamin Hoffmann (born 1985) - creative writer and professor
- Manouchka Kelly Labouba - Gabonese filmmaker and screenwriter
- Antoinette Tidjani Alou - lecturer in Comparative Literature at Abdou Moumouni University, Niger

== See also ==
- List of public universities in France by academy
- Michel de Montaigne
- University of Bordeaux
