= Centre de Recherche Berbère =

Research Center

- Centre de Recherche Berbère
- Formation: 1990; 35 years ago
- Founder: Salem Chaker
- Purpose: Studying the Berber languages
- Parent organization: Institut national des langues et civilisations orientales

Centre de Recherche Berbère (CRB, English: Berber Research Center) is a department at the Institut national des langues et civilisations orientales (INALCO) specializing in the Berber languages. The center is the oldest organization which focuses on Berber culture and language, being one of the very few to do so. It cooperates with the Institut royal de la culture amazighe du Maroc and programs at Moroccan universities.

The center was founded in 1990 by the Algerian Berber linguist Salem Chaker and managed by him until the end of 2009. Since January 2010, it is headed by Abdellah Bounfour.
