= Nafissatou Dia Diouf =

Senegalese writer in French

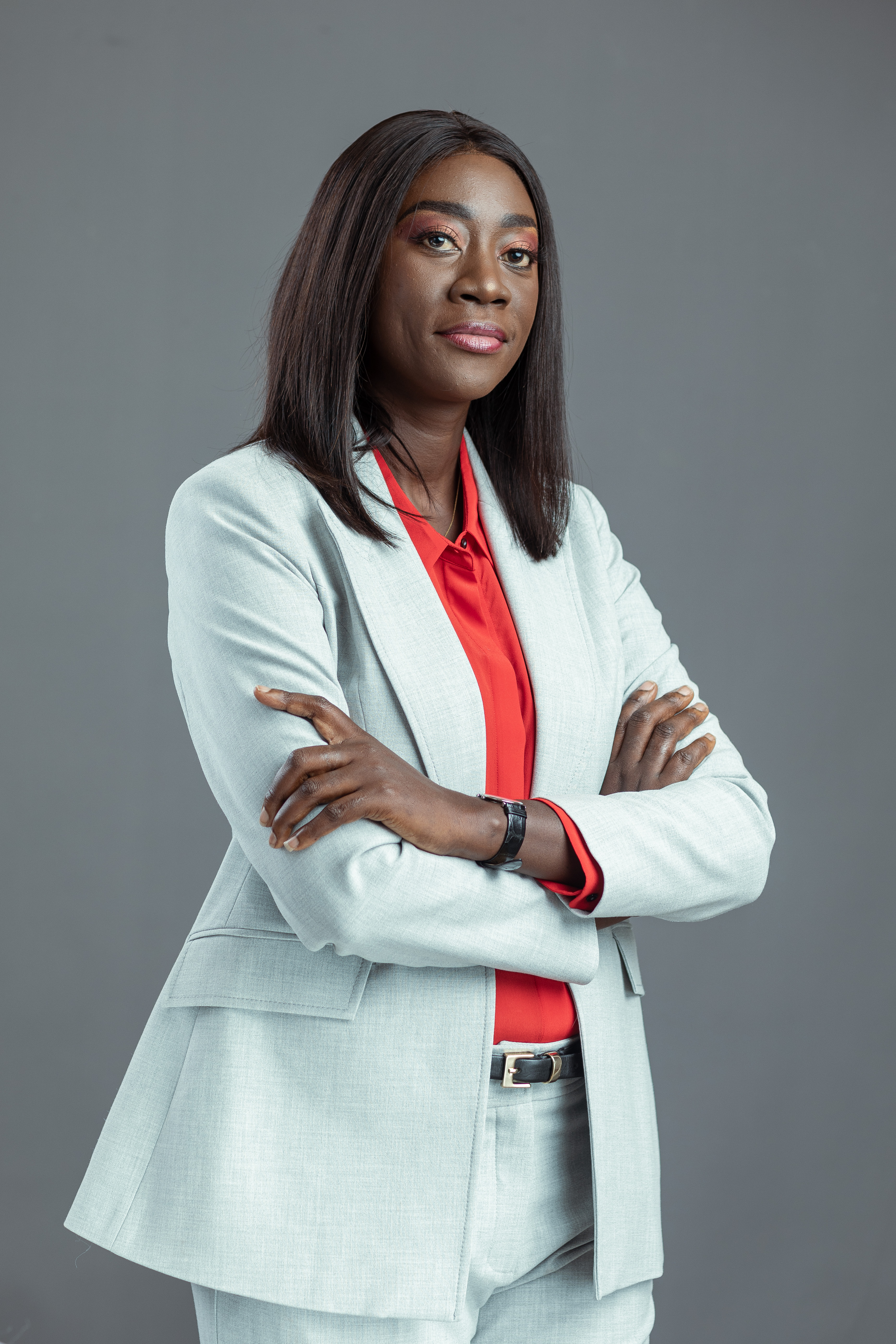

Nafissatou Dia Diouf (born September 11, 1973 in Dakar) is a Senegalese writer in French.

Her father was a diplomat and her mother was a teacher. She attended the Michel de Montaigne University Bordeaux 3, where she studied Applied Foreign Languages in International Commerce, Marketing and Commercial Law, Business and Commerce. She has also completed postgraduate studies in Industrial Logistics. Five years later, she came back to Senegal.

== Prizes ==
- Young French-speaking writer Award, France, 1999
- Francomania Award, Canada, 2000
- Foundation Senghor Award, Senegal, 2000

== Works ==
- 2001 : Retour d'un si long exil
- 2003 : Primeur, poèmes de jeunesse
- 2004 : Le Fabuleux Tour du monde de Raby
- 2005 : Je découvre l'ordinateur
- 2005 : Cytor & Tic Tic naviguent sur la toile
- 2008 : Les petits chercheurs
- 2010 : Cirque de Missira et autres nouvelles
