= Salem Chaker =

Algerian linguist

- Salem u Aɛli Ijlili
- Born: 1950 (age 75–76); Nevers, France
- Education: University of Provence Paris Descartes University
- Occupation: Berberologist

Salem Chaker (Kabyle: Salem u Aɛli Ijlili; born 1950 in Nevers) is a French linguist. A specialist in Berber linguistics (syntax, diachrony, sociolinguistics), he is recognized as the "dean" of modern Berber studies.

== Biography ==
Salem Chaker was born in 1950 in Nevers, France to a Kabyle family from the Ait Iraten tribe of Kabylia. He studied at the University of Provence, then in Paris Descartes University where he received his Doctorat de troisième cycle in 1973 and a Doctorat d'Etat in 1978. After an early career in the Faculty of Letters of Algiers and CRAPE (Centre de Recherches Anthropologiques Préhistoriques et Ethnologiques) from 1973 to 1981, he joins University of Provence serving as an associate professor of Berber Language from 1981 to 1983, and CNRS from 1984 to 1989 where he continued his research activities in the laboratory LAPMO (Laboratoire d'anthropologie et de préhistoire de la Méditerranée occidentale) founded and directed by Gabriel Camps. From 1989 to 2008, he worked as a Berber Language Professor at Institut national des langues et civilisations orientales ("Langues'O") in Paris, where he created in 1990 Centre de Recherche Berbère (Berber Research Center) he directed until the end of 2009. He is currently Professor of Berber language at the Aix-Marseille University where he is also a research associate at Iremam (Institut de recherches et d'études sur le monde arabe et musulman).

=== Encyclopédie berbère ===
His involvement in the Encyclopédie berbère dates back to the launching phase of the project by Gabriel Camps in 1970, when he was still a student at the University of Provence. The founding team comprising only pre-historians and ethnologists, Gabriel asked him to invest in the linguistic field. Thus appeared his first contribution to the Encyclopedie, in Fascicle 1, dated 1970, of the provisional edition with restricted diffusion. It was also his first scientific text, while he was still studying linguistics. He started publishing regularly entries in the provisional edition, then in the final edition from 1984. At the launch of the final edition, he officially became a scientific advisor for linguistics. When Camps retired in 1992, he asked him to ensure the succession of the Encyclopédie berbère in case of default. Salem Chaker has been in charge of the Encyclopédie since the death of Gabriel Camps in September 2002.

== Works ==
- Un parler berbère d'Algérie (Kabylie): syntaxe (in French). Publications Université de Provence. 1983-01-01. ISBN 978-2-85399-075-2.
- Textes en linguistique berbère: introduction au domaine berbère (in French). Paris: Centre national de la recherche scientifique. 1984. ISBN 9782222035787.
- Textes touaregs en prose de Charles de Foucauld..., Réédition critique avec traduction, Aix-en-Provence, Edisud, 1984, 359 p. [en collaboration avec H. Claudot et M. Gast].
- Etudes touarègues: bilan des recherches en sciences sociales : institutions, chercheurs, bibliographie (in French). Aix-en-Provence: Edisud/Iremam. 1988. ISBN 978-2-85744-369-8.
- Berbères aujourd'hui (in French) (1st ed.). Paris: L'Harmattan. 1998. ISBN 9782296378131.
- Une décennie d'études berbères (1980-1990): bibliographie critique: langue, littérature, identité (in French). Editions Bouchene. 1992.
- Linguistique berbère: études de syntaxe et de diachronie (in French). Paris - Leuven: Peeters Publishers. 1995. ISBN 9782877231527.
