= Central Railway Building =

- সেন্ট্রাল রেলওয়ে বিল্ডিং
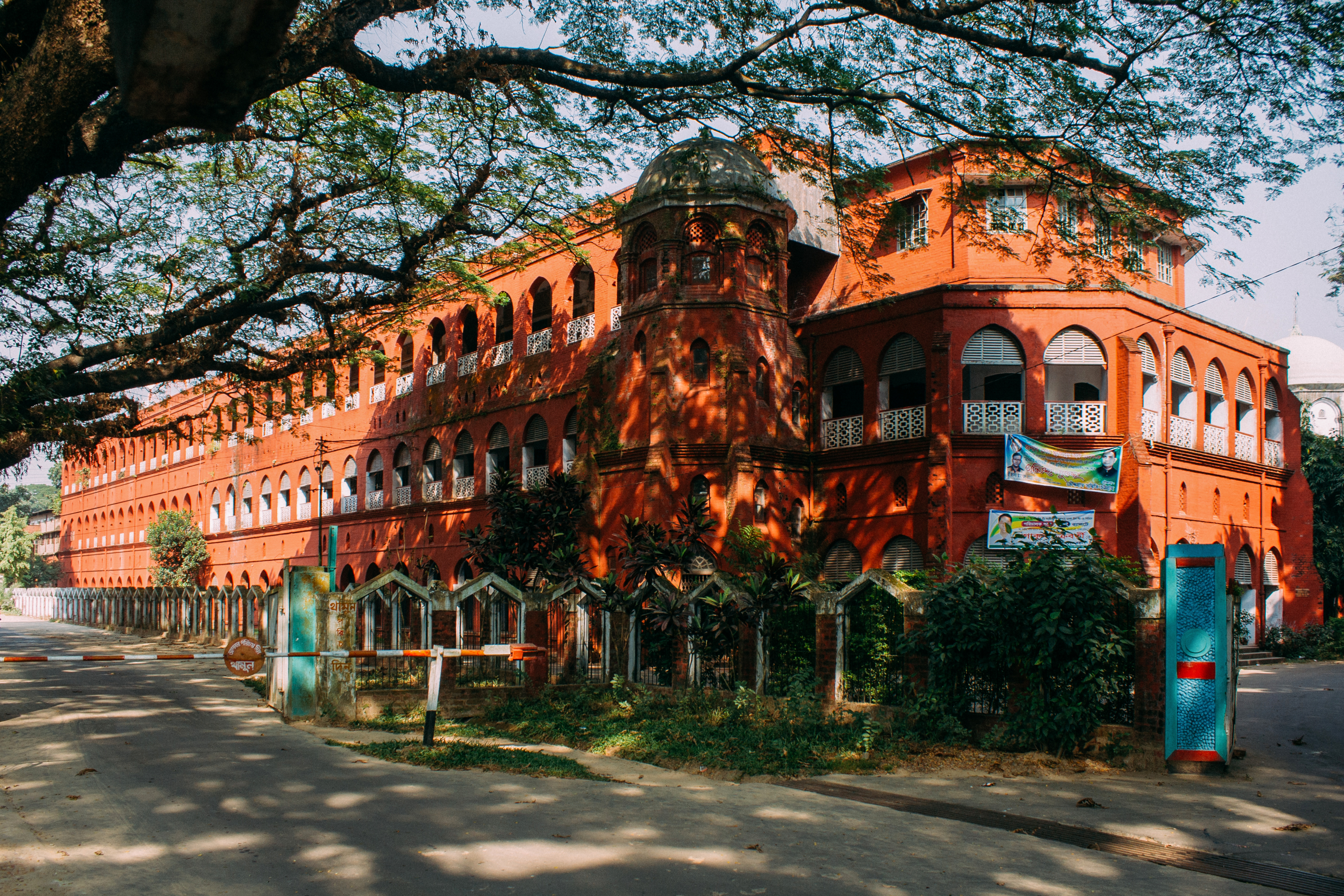
- Central Railway Building
- Interactive map of the Central Railway Building area
- Alternative names: CRB

General information
- Location: Chittagong, Bangladesh
- Coordinates: 22.3420°N 91.8216°E
- Construction started: 1897

The Central Railway Building (CRB) is situated in the scenic hilly area of Chittagong, Bangladesh. It is the governing office for the general manager of Bangladesh Railway. Construction started in 1897, it is one of the oldest buildings of the port city. To the east, across CRB Road, is Railway Hospital at CRB, built in 1994. There is a proposal to establish a 50-bed medical college at CRB and up-grade the existing Railway Hospital to 250 beds. There is a residential area for the railway officers surrounding it.

== Architecture ==
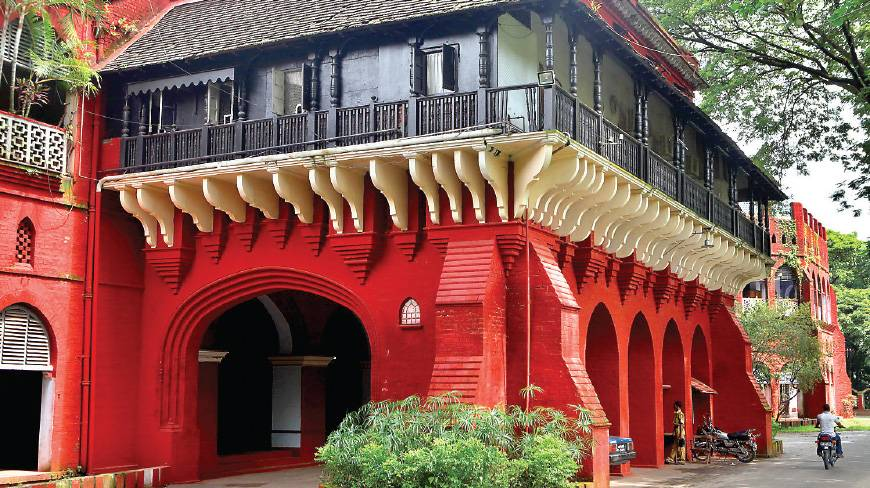
Porte-cochère

The principal (south) façade is two storeys high and 360 feet (110 m) in length with three projections: a large porte-cochère in the centre and semi-octagonal towers at either end. The porte-cochère consists of a five bay arcade with buttresses of corbelled brickwork at each corner. Each of the two vehicle entrances is spanned by a large pointed arch. The porte-cochère opens on to a 12 feet (3.7 m) wide continuous veranda with pointed arch openings, the tympana of which are filled with louvre frames for ventilation and shade. The veranda on the second storey wraps around the porte-cochère in a narrower strip supported by concrete brackets set on corbelled brick footings. This strip of veranda is covered with a sloping shingled roof. The entrance foyer is surmounted by a hemispherical dome. The blocks behind the semi-octagonal terminal projections are three storeys high.

== In popular culture ==
=== Pohela Boishakh celebration ===
Pohela Boishakh or Nobo Borsho or Bengali New Year celebrated every year on the open stage called "Shireeshtala" at CRB area. This open stage surrounded by several old Albizia lebbeck trees, in Bengali it is called Shireesh.

Boli Khela, a type of free hand wrestling, is organised every year at this place during the Bangla New Year festival. At the festival it is the centre of attraction for people of all ages.

== Gallery ==
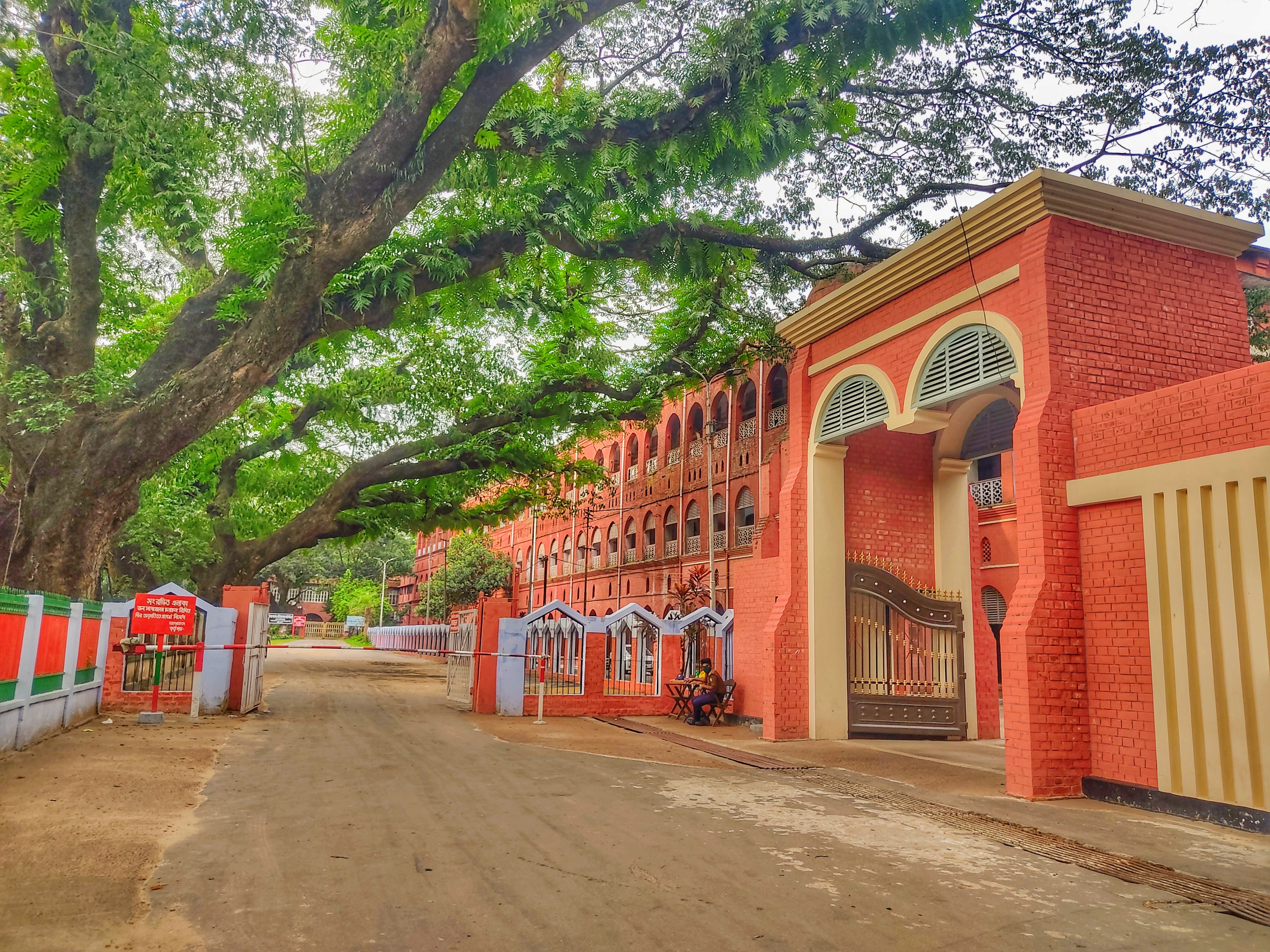
CRB building

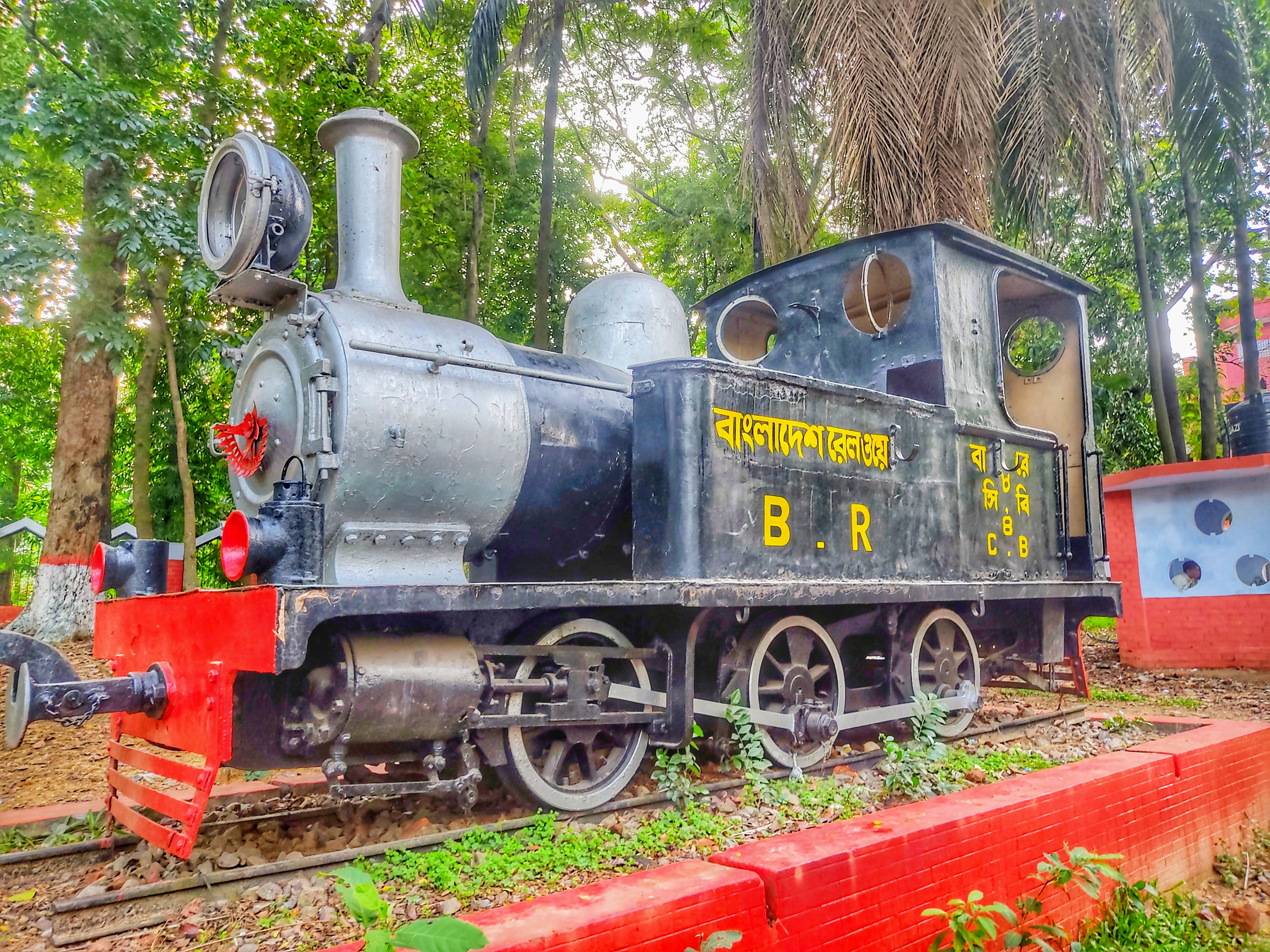
First ever steam engine of Bangladesh at CRB

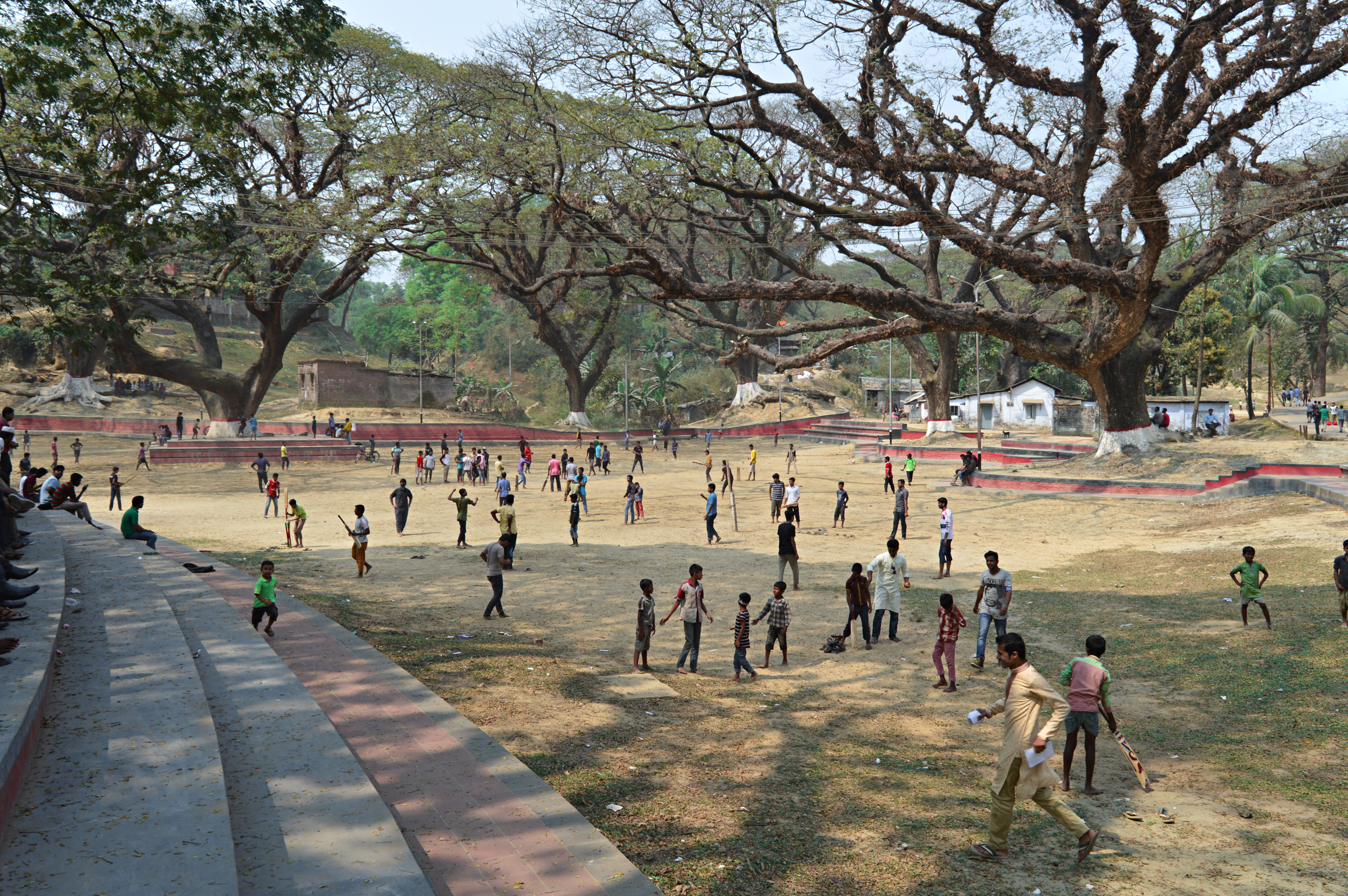
Shireeshtala, south-west exposure

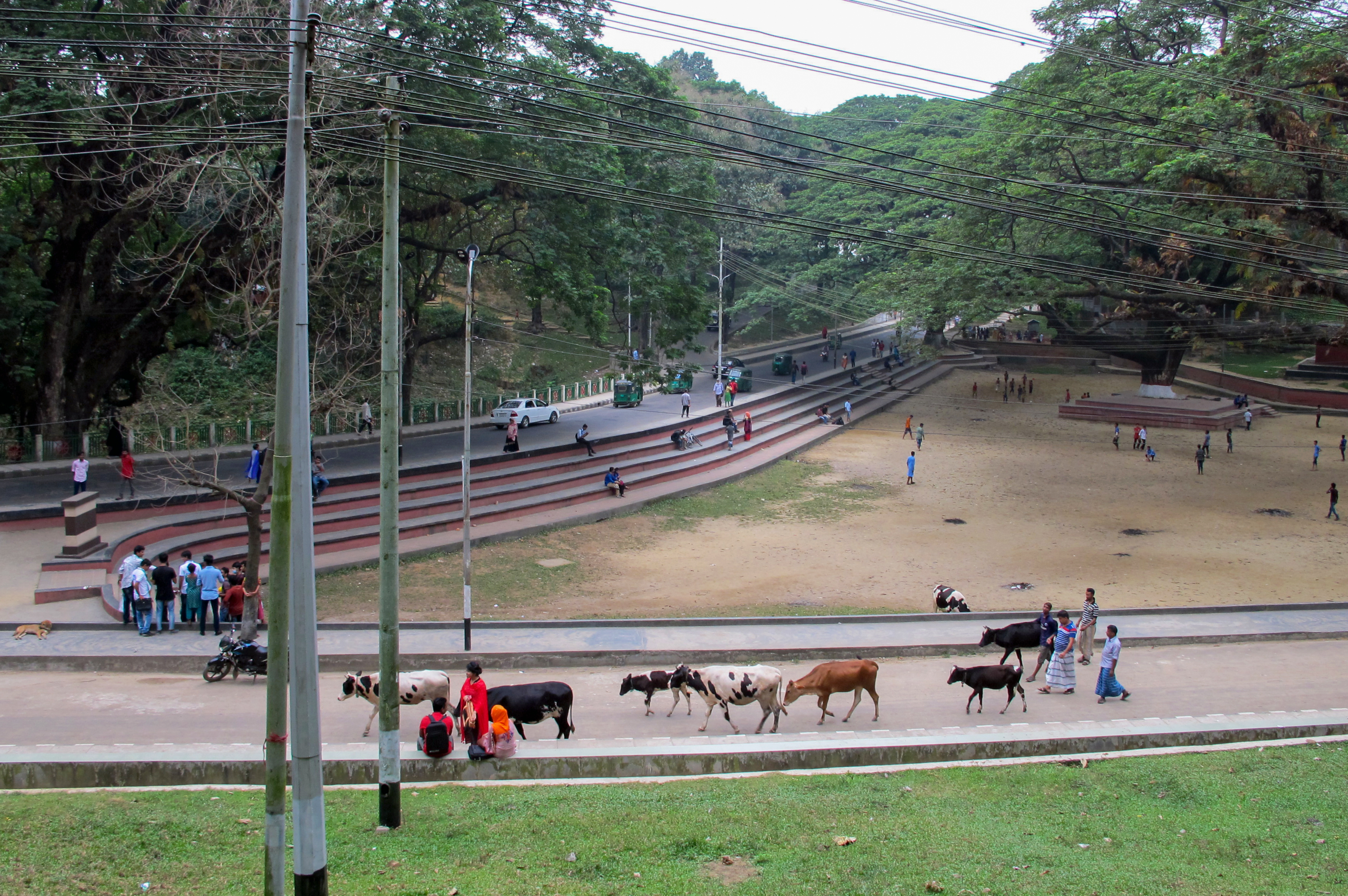
Shireeshtala, west exposure

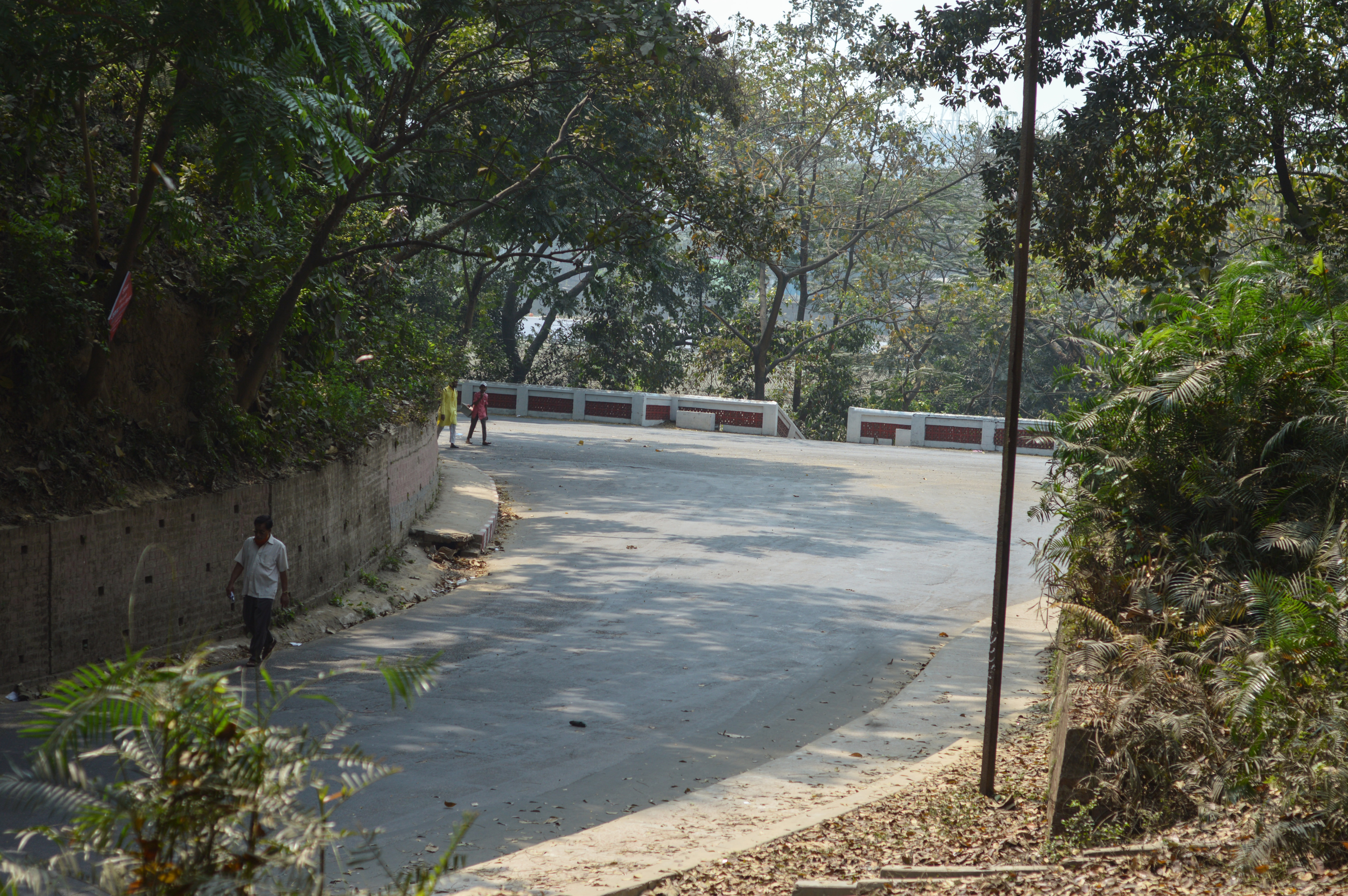
CRB Road

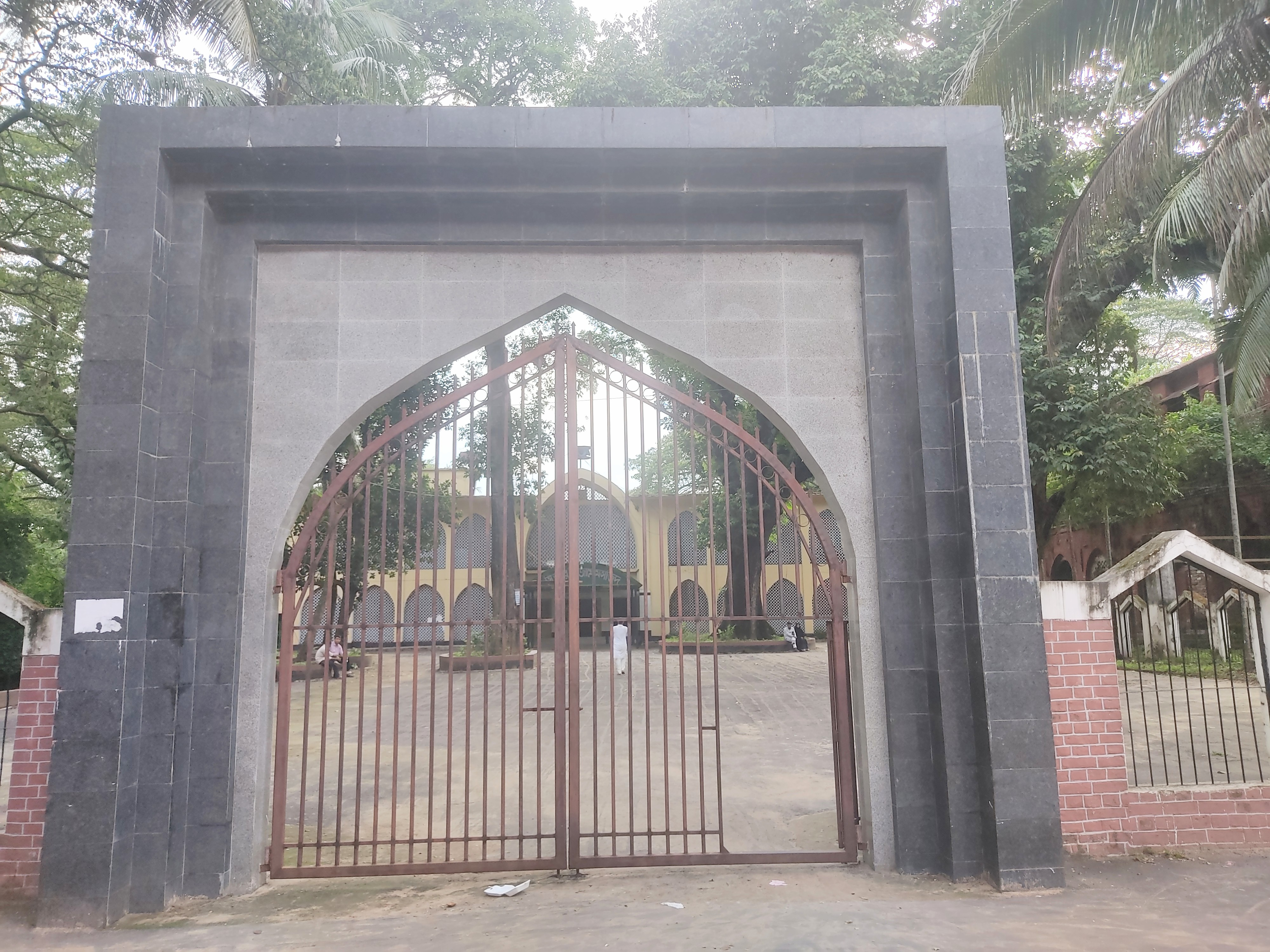
CRB Mosque gate

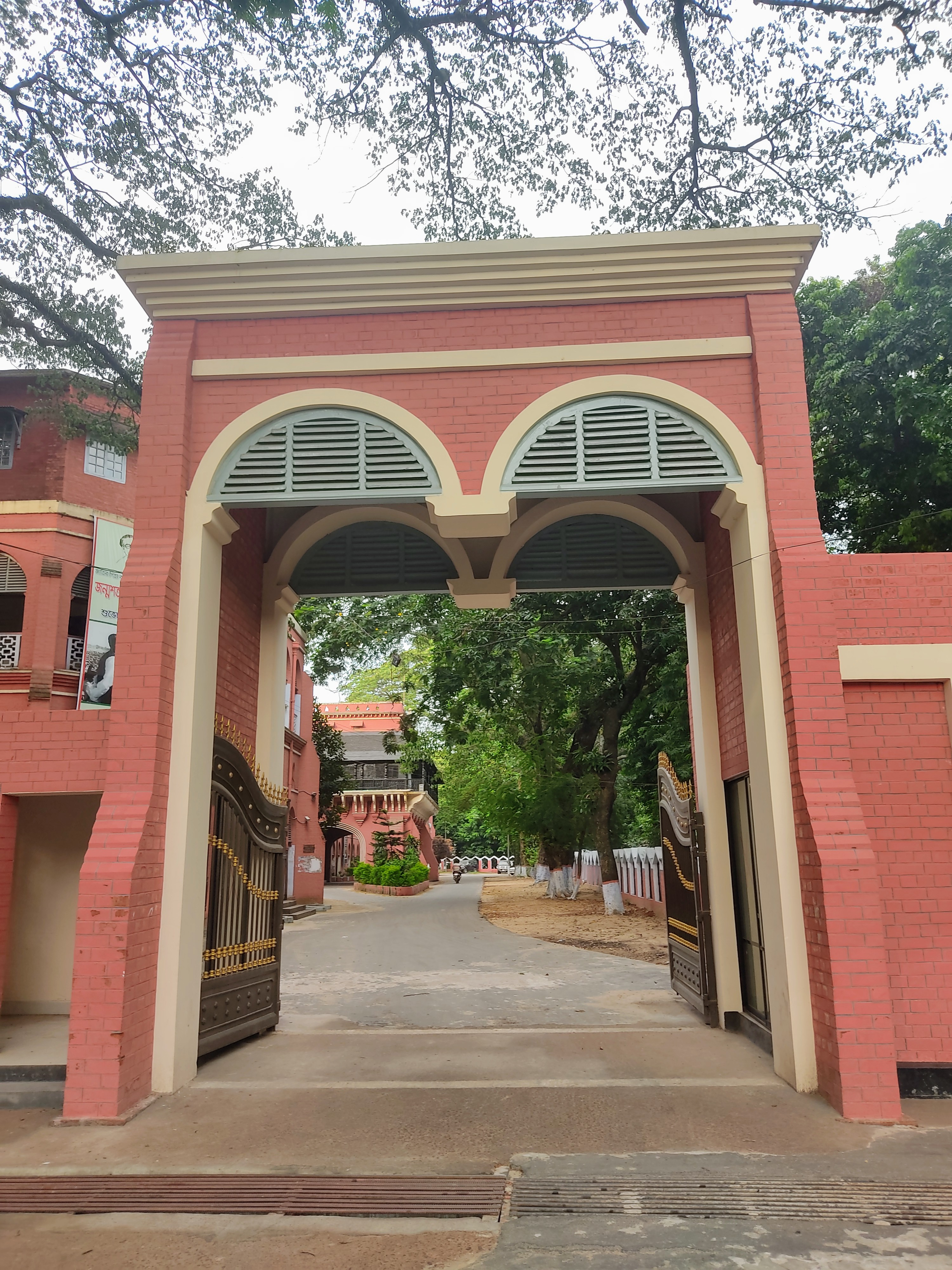
CRB gate

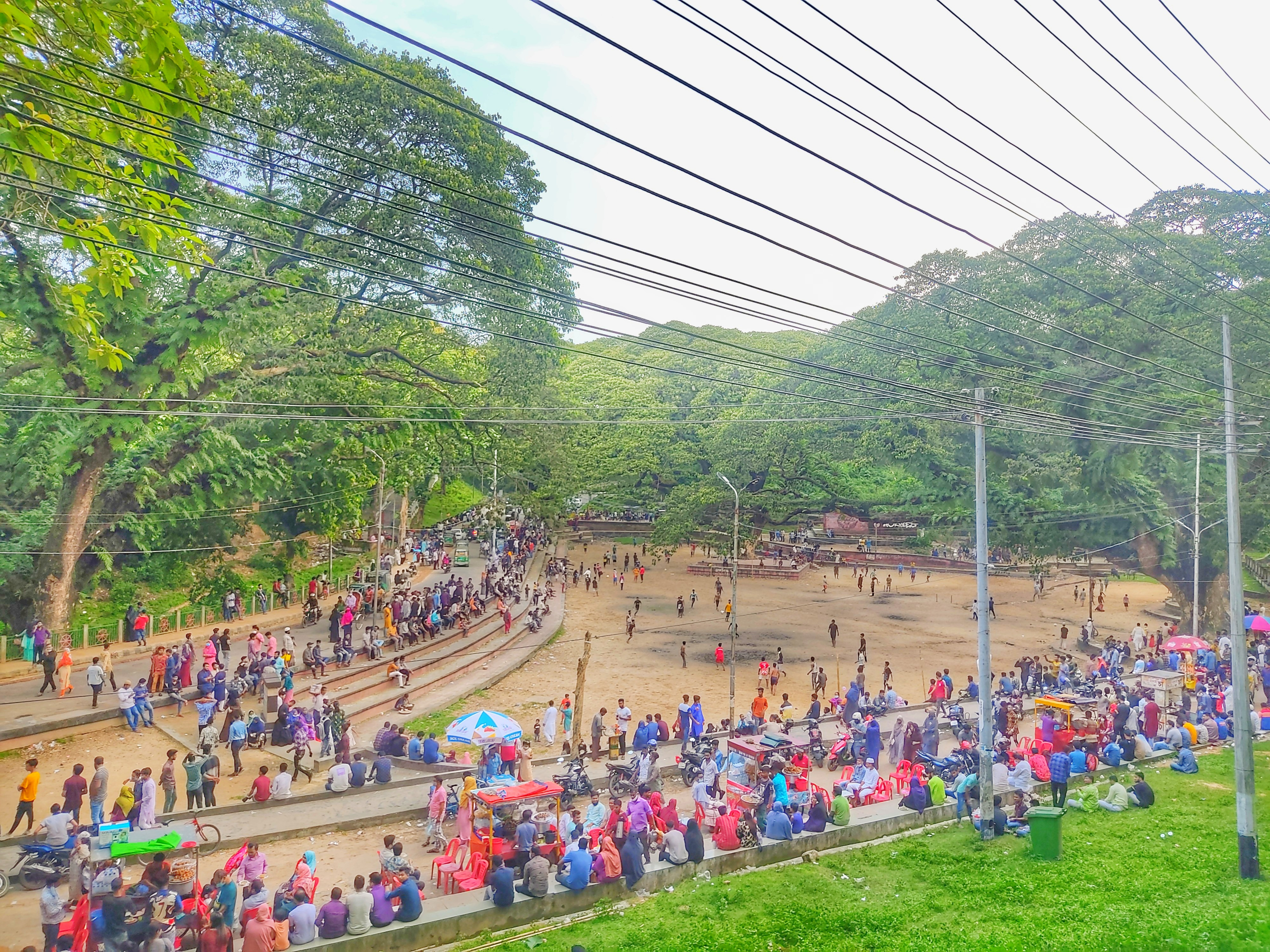
Shiresshtala

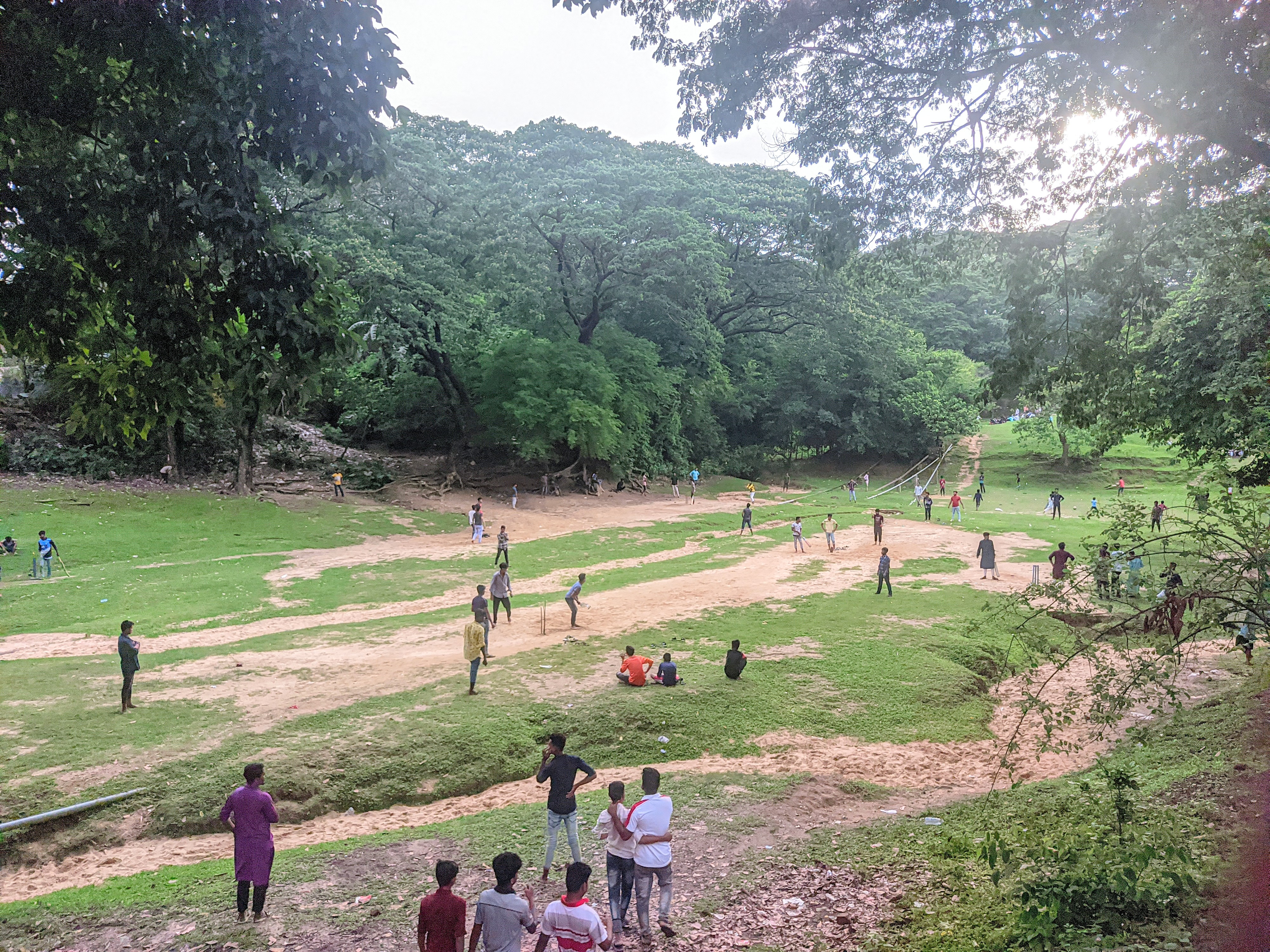
Green ground at CRB
