= University of Bordeaux =

Public university based in southwestern France

- Université de Bordeaux
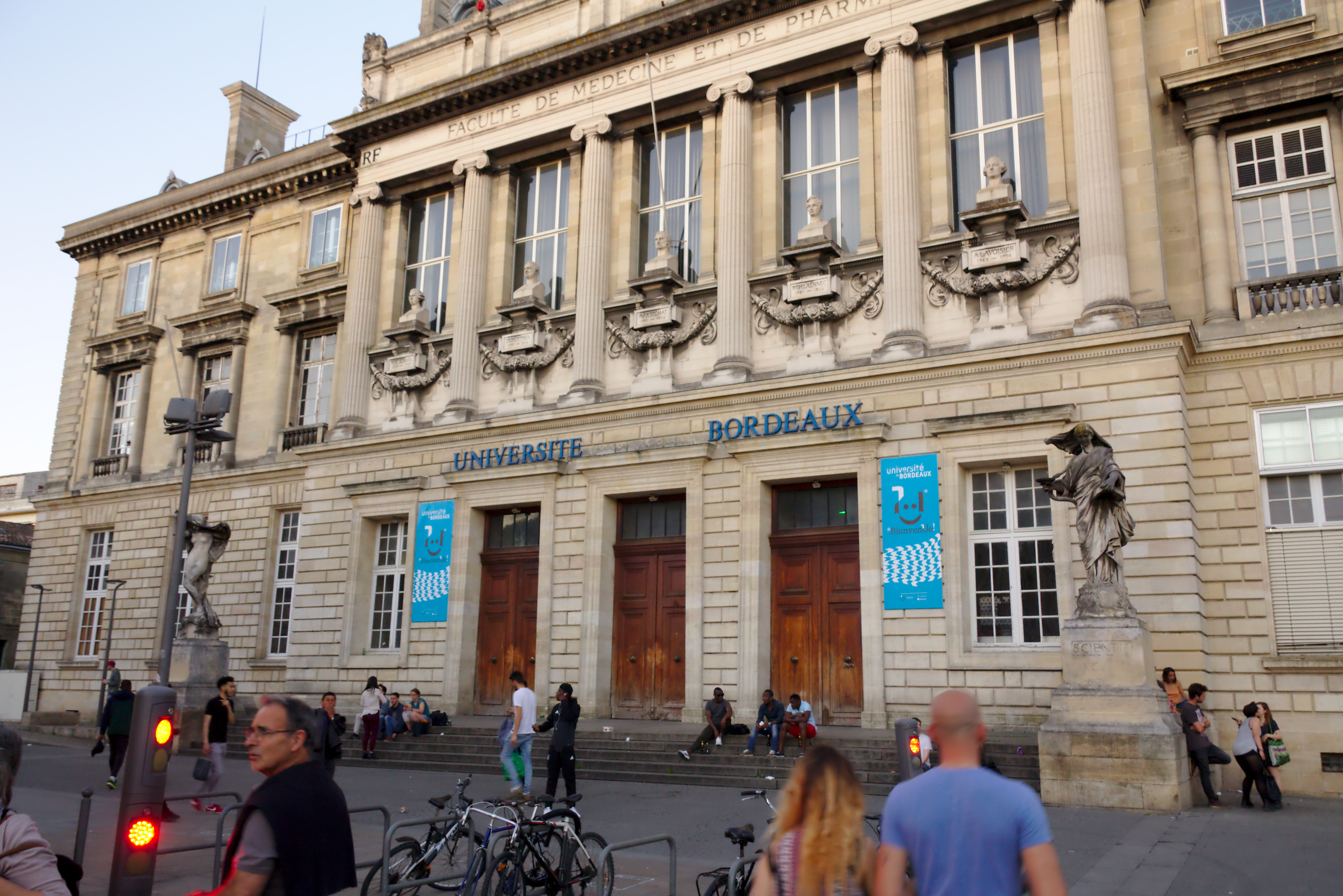
- Victoire Campus, Bordeaux
- Motto: Sit lumine illustrant millennii. (French: Que la lumière illumine les millénaires) (English: May the light illuminate the millennia)
- Type: Public
- Established: 1441; 585 years ago (initial formation)
- Academic affiliations: AACSB, AUF, CUEA, EUA
- Endowment: €892 million
- President: Dean Lewis
- Academic staff: 6,000 including 3,200 professors
- Students: 54,000
- Location: Talence, Nouvelle-Aquitaine, France; 44°48′26.4″N 0°35′48.2″W
- Website: u-bordeaux.fr

The University of Bordeaux (French: Université de Bordeaux, pronounced [ynivɛʁsite də bɔʁdo]) is a public research university based in Nouvelle-Aquitaine in southwestern France.

It has several campuses in the cities and towns of Bordeaux, Dax, Gradignan, Périgueux, Pessac, and Talence. There are also several smaller teaching sites in various other towns in the region, including in Bayonne.

The University of Bordeaux counts more than 50,000 students, over 6,000 of which are international. Alumni include three Nobel Prize winners, two members of France's National Assembly, a member of the Chamber of Deputies, and a King of Morocco. It is a member of the ComUE d'Aquitaine university group.

== History ==
The original Université de Bordeaux was established by Pope Eugene IV on 7 June 1441 when Bordeaux was an English town. In 1793, during the French Revolution, the National Convention abolished the university. The university re-opened in 1896 as a result of the law of 18 July 1896. In 1970, the university was split into three universities: Bordeaux I, Bordeaux II, and Bordeaux III. In 1995, Bordeaux IV split off from Bordeaux I. Since 2014, the aforementioned universities have been reunited to form the University of Bordeaux, except for Bordeaux III, which did not take part in the merger and remains independent of the University of Bordeaux.

== Academics ==
As of the 2025 school year, the university is organized into four colleges:

- Law, political science, economics, and management
- Health sciences
- Humanities
- Sciences & technology

Additionally, the university has four constituent institutes, which are the:

- Institute of Technology (IUT)
- Institute of Business Administration (IAE)
- Science Institute of Vine and Wine (ISVV)
- National Higher Institute for Teaching and Education (INSPE)

The University of Bordeaux has a strong reputation for studies in psychology, ranking fourth in France in Le Figaro's 2023 ranking.

University rankings
- Université de Bordeaux

Global – Overall
- ARWU World: 201-300 (2025)
- CWTS World: 344 (2025)
- QS World: =494 (2026)
- THE World: 401-500 (2025)
- USNWR Global: 292 (2026)

== Campuses ==
Unlike most North American universities, most French universities do not have one central campus. The University of Bordeaux has seven facilities within the environs of Bordeaux, and 22 sites across the Nouvelle-Aquitaine region.

The University's Peixotto, Bordes, and Montagne-Montesquieu campuses form a continuous university area south of the city center, in the areas of Talence and Pessac. These house the University's science and technology faculty, as well as parts of the college of law, political science, economics and management. Parts of Bordeaux Montaigne University are also on this campus.

The University's law department also has a site at Place Pey Berland, in close proximity to the Bordeaux Cathedral, the Bordeaux courthouse, and the École nationale de la magistrature, the French national judiciary school.

The Bastide campus is located on the right bank of the Garonne river, opposite the city center, and houses the University's Institut d'administration des entreprises, or business school, IAE Bordeaux, as well as some of the University's Institut universitaire de technologie, IUT de Bordeaux, programs related to accounting and management.

The University's Victoire campus is located on Place de la Victoire, at the end of Rue Saint-Catherine. Part of the building was designed as a monument historique in 2016. The Victoire campus contains the faculties of anthropology, sociology, education, and psychology.

In 1915, French actress Sarah Bernhardt had her leg amputated at the nearby Hôpital Saint-Augustin; the amputated leg was reportedly kept in the medical faculty at the Victoire campus until the faculty was moved in 1977.

Different campuses of the University of Bordeaux
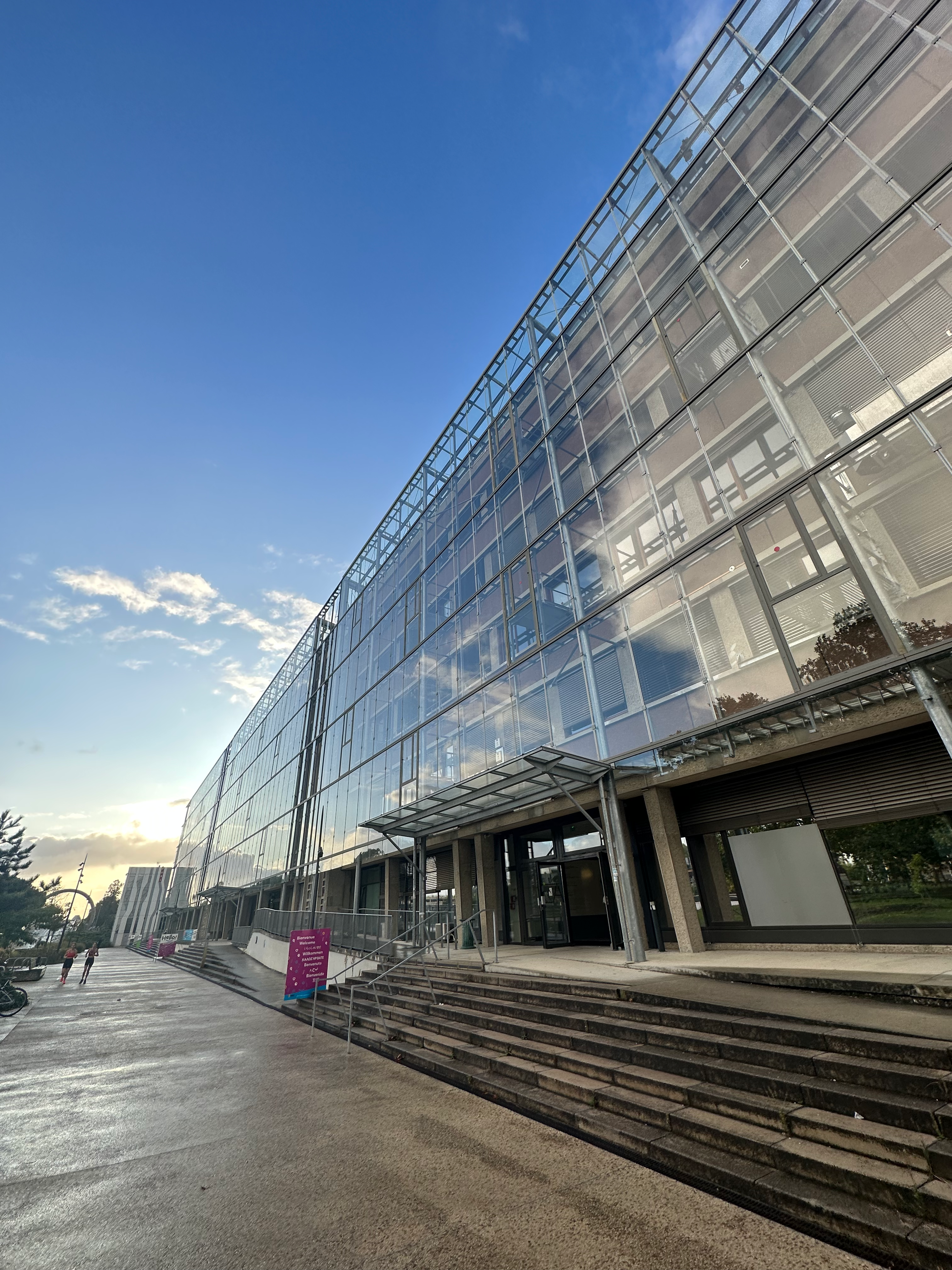
University of Bordeaux Peixotto Campus.

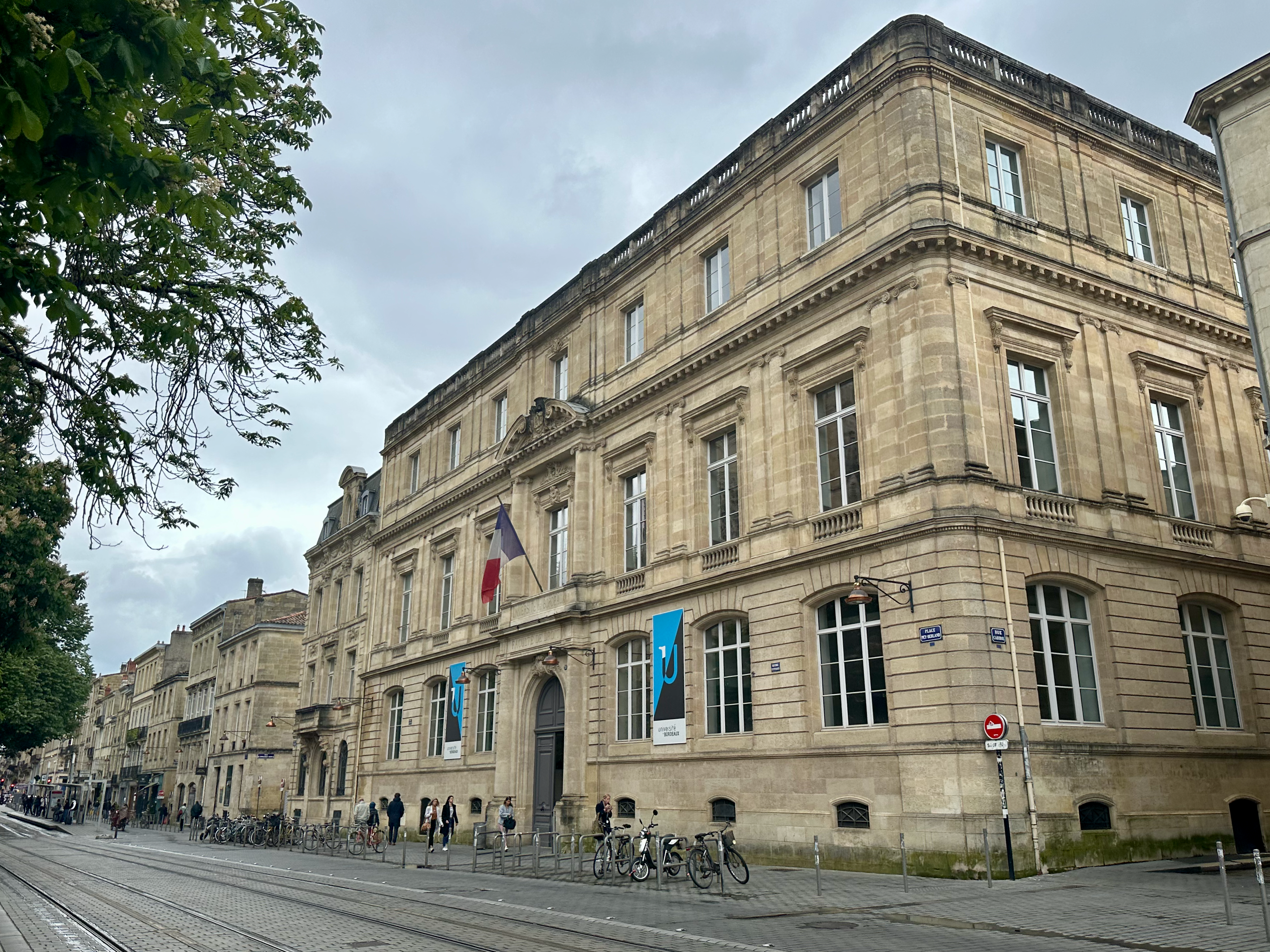
University of Bordeaux at Place Pey Berland. The École Nationale de la Magistrature and Cathédrale Saint-André are adjacent.

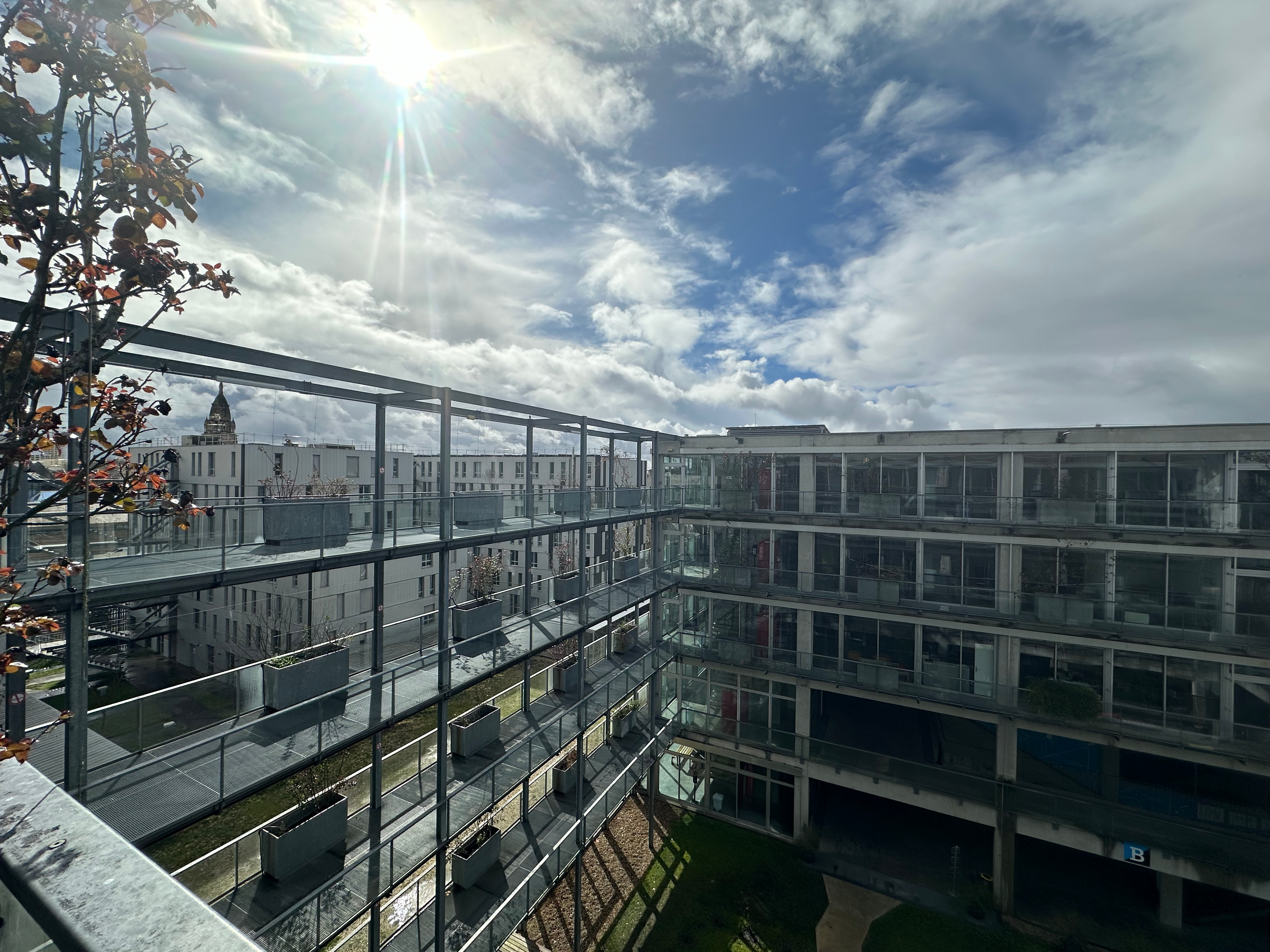
Interior courtyard of the Bastide campus. This campus is located on the opposite side of the Garonne River as the majority of the city.

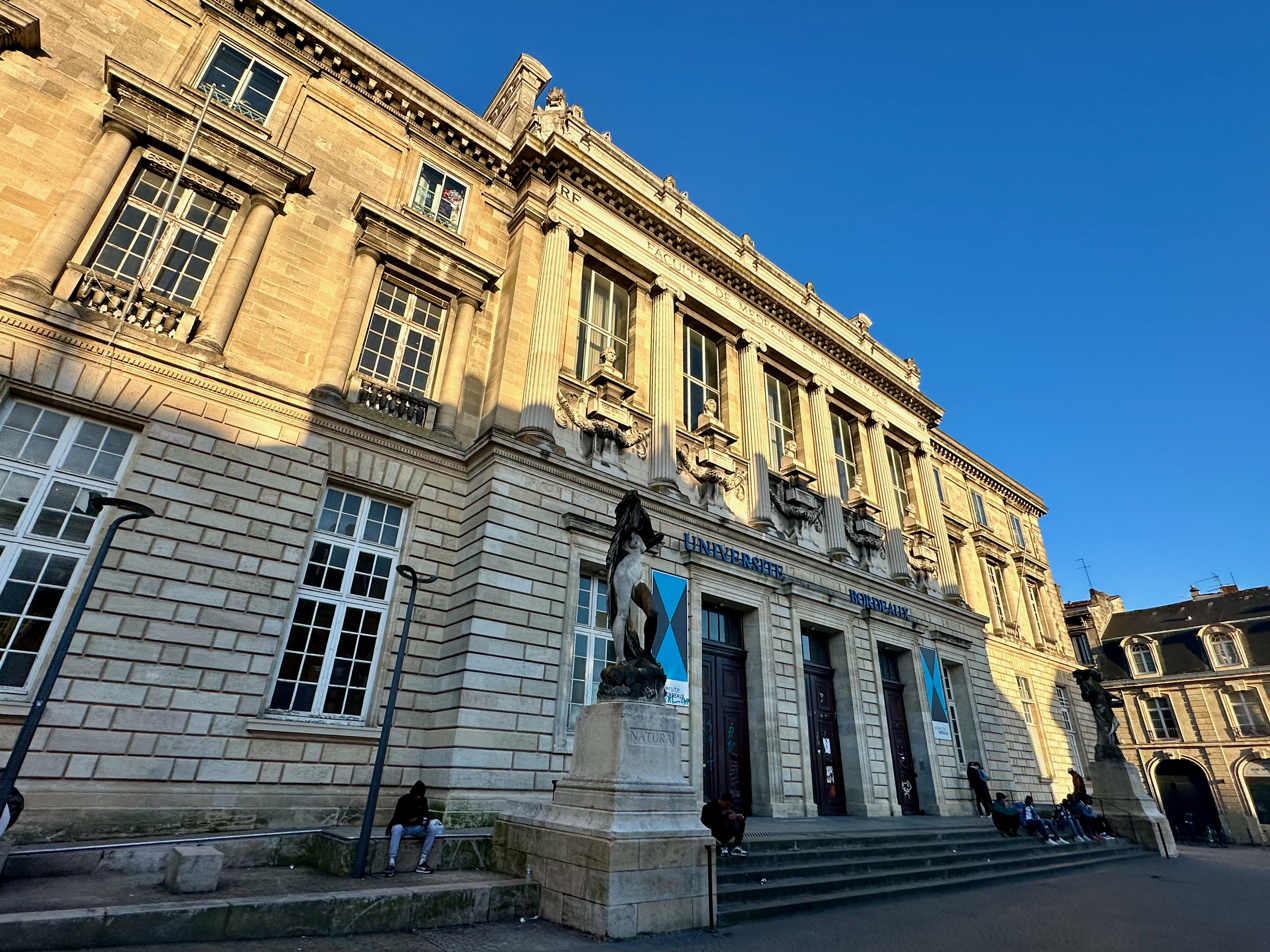
University of Bordeaux Victoire Campus, home to psychology, social sciences, and the former home of the medical school.

== Demography ==
Number of students at University of Bordeaux

Year	Pop.	±% p.a.
2006	44,037	—
2007	43,678	−0.82%
2008	42,902	−1.78%
2009	43,289	+0.90%
2010	42,581	−1.64%
2011	43,902	+3.10%
2012	44,933	+2.35%
2013	46,306	+3.06%
2014	46,891	+1.26%
2015	49,292	+5.12%

Year	Pop.	±% p.a.
2016	50,584	+2.62%
2017	50,970	+0.76%
2018	51,119	+0.29%
2019	50,519	−1.17%
2020	48,735	−3.53%
2021	48,707	−0.06%
2022	46,845	−3.82%
2023	47,177	+0.71%
2024	48,161	+2.09%

Note: The Universities of Bordeaux-I, Bordeaux-II et Bordeaux-IV were merged into one University of Bordeaux in 2014.
Source: data.gouv.fr rers.depp.education.fr/2024 rers.depp.education.fr/2025

== Notable alumni ==
=== Academia ===
- Geoffrey Keating (c. 1569–c. 1644), Irish historian
- Léon Duguit (1859–1928), French scholar of public law
- Henri Moysset (1875–1949), French historian and politician
- Jacques Ellul (1912–1994), French philosopher, sociologist, lay theologian, and professor
- James Joll (1918–1994), British historian and university lecturer
- Julio Cotler (1932–2019), Peruvian anthropologist and sociologist
- Théophile Obenga (b. 1936), Congolese Egyptologist
- Spencer C. Tucker (b. 1937), American military historian
- Charles Butterworth (b. 1938), American political philosopher
- Helene Hagan (b. 1939), Moroccan–American anthropologist and Amazigh activist
- Pascal Salin (b. 1939), French economist and professor
- Marie-France Vignéras (b. 1946), French mathematician
- Alfredo Co (b. 1949), Filipino Sinologist
- Idowu Bantale Omole (b. 1954), Nigerian professor and academic administrator
- Abderrahmane Hadj-Salah (1928–2017), Algerian linguist
- Roger Naslain (b. 1936), professor of chemical and physical science at the University of Bordeaux
- Guy Brousseau (1933–2024), French mathematician
- Éric Lamarque (b. 1967), French academic and advisor to the French government on banking

=== Activism ===
- Aubrey Willis Williams (1890–1965), American social and civil rights activist
- Jean-Claude Bajeux (1931–2011), Haitian political activist and professor
- Louis Clayton Jones (1935–2006), African-American international attorney and civil rights leader

=== Business ===
- Mireille Gillings (b. 1971), French Canadian neurobiologist and entrepreneur
- Olivier Le Peuch (b. 1963/1964), French businessman, CEO of Schlumberger

=== Law ===
- Thomas Barclay (c. 1570–1632), Scottish jurist and professor
- Montesquieu (1689–1755), legal philosopher and political theorist
- Ba Maw (1893–1977), Burmese politician
- James Marshall Sprouse (1923–2004), United States Circuit judge

=== Literature and journalism ===
- François Mauriac (1885–1970) French novelist, dramatist, critic, poet, journalist and Nobel laureate (1952)
- Saint-John Perse (1887–1975), French poet and diplomat, Nobel laureate (1960)
- Lucien Xavier Michel-Andrianarahinjaka (1929–1997), Malagasy writer, poet and politician
- Annie Ernaux (b. 1940), Nobel laureate (2022) French writer and professor of literature
- Esther Seligson (1941–2010), Mexican writer, poet, translator, and historian
- Lee Mallory (b. 1946), American poet, editor and academic
- Marc Saikali (b. 1965), Lebanese–French journalist
- Sarah Ladipo Manyika (b. 1969), British Nigerian writer

=== Medicine ===
- Jean Abadie (1873–1946), professor of neuropsychiatry
- Jean Auriac (1906-1941), professor of physical medicine and member of the Resistance "Mort pour la France" (Died for France)
- Xavier Arnozan (1852-1928), professor of therapeutics
- Michel Bénézech (1942-2025), forensic psychiatrist and professor of criminology
- Jean Bergonié (1857-1925), professor of oncology
- Marc-Louis Bourgeois (1934-2025), professor of psychiatry
- Jean-René Cruchet (1875-1902), professor of pediatry
- Paul Delmas-Marsalet (1898–1977), professor of neuropsychiatry
- Élie Gintrac(1791-1877), founder of the faculty of medicine and pharmacy
- Angelo Hesnard (1886-1969), psychiatrist of the French navy, psychoanalyst
- Victor Pachon (1867-1939), physiologist
- Albert Pitres (1848-1928), professor of internal medicine, neuropsychiatrist, founder of the university campus of La Victoire
- Georges Portmann (1890-1985), professor of otorhinolaryngology
- Emmanuel Régis (1855–1918), professor of neuropsychiatrist
- Victor Segalen (1878-1918), médecin, romancier, poète, ethnographe

=== Performing arts ===
- Luc Plissonneau (b. 1961), French screenwriter and film director
- Morteza Heidari (b. 1968), Iranian TV presenter
- Koffi Olomide (b. 1956), Congolese singer-songwriter

=== Politics ===
- Hassan II (1929–1999), King of Morocco
- Jean Baptiste Gay, vicomte de Martignac (1778–1832), French statesman
- Jean Ybarnégaray (1883–1956), Basque–French politician
- Michel Buillard (1950), mayor of Papeete, French Polynesia
- Jean-Fernand Audeguil (1887–1956), French politician
- Ba Maw (1893–1977), Head of State of Burma
- Michel Kafando (b. 1942), Burkinabé diplomat
- Xavier Darcos (b. 1947), French politician, scholar, civil servant and former Minister of Labour
- Jean-Paul Gonzalez (b. 1947), French virologist
- Mario Aoun (b. 1951), Lebanese politician
- Alain Vidalies (b. 1951), the French Secretary of State for Transport, the Sea and Fisheries
- Nagoum Yamassoum (b. 1954), Chadian politician and former Prime Minister of Chad
- Anicet-Georges Dologuélé (b. 1957), Central African politician
- Reza Taghipour (b. 1957), Iranian conservative politician
- Thierry Santa (b. 1967), French Polynesian politician in New Caledonia
- Germaine Kouméalo Anaté (b. 1968), Togolese government minister, scholar and writer
- Olivier Falorni (b. 1972), French politician
- Myriam El Khomri (b. 1978), French politician

=== Sciences ===
- Joseph-Ignace Guillotin (1738–1814), French physician, politician and freemason and namesake of the guillotine
- Célestin Sieur (1860–1955), French physician
- Charles-Joseph Marie Pitard (1873–1927), French pharmacist and botanist
- Pierre-Paul Grassé (1895–1985), French zoologist
- Laure Gatet (1913–1943), French pharmacist, biochemist and spy
- Basile Adjou Moumouni (1922–2019), Beninese physician
- Roland Paskoff (1933–2005), French geologist
- Jean-Marie Tarascon (b. 1953), French chemist and professor
- Bruno Vallespir (b. 1960), French engineer and professor

=== Sports ===
- Jean-Pierre Escalettes (b. 1935), French retired footballer
- Karounga Keïta (1941–2023), Malian football official and former coach and player
- Bixente Lizarazu (b. 1969), Basque–French retired footballer

=== Visual arts ===
- Charles James (1906–1978), English-American fashion designer

=== Winemaking ===
- Emma Gao
- Émile Peynaud (1912–2004), French oenologist

== See also ==
- List of medieval universities

== Literature ==
- International Dictionary of University Histories, Routledge, 2013, pp. 429–431.
