= Sophie Morgenstern =

French psychiatrist and psychoanalyst

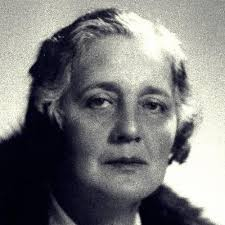
Sophie Morgenstern

Sophie Morgenstern (1 April 1875 – 13 June 1940) was a French psychiatrist and psychoanalyst. She is known in France as a pioneer of child psychoanalysis and an influence on more famous figures such as Françoise Dolto.

Originally of Polish Jewish origin, Morgenstern went to medical school in Zurich, where she studied at the Burghölzli clinic under Eugen Bleuler and Eugene Minkowski.

She came to Paris in the 1920s where she was analysed by Eugénie Sokolnicka, one of the first Freudian psychoanalysts present in France. She worked at the Hôpital Vaugirard, under the direction of Georges Heuyer, from 1924. Her innovations included the use of drawings in child psychotherapy.

She committed suicide in Paris in June 1940 after the Nazis entered the city.
