= Eugène Minkowski =

French psychiatrist (1885–1972)

- Born: Eugeniusz Minkowski; 17 April 1885; Saint Petersburg, Russian Empire
- Died: 17 November 1972 (aged 87); Paris, France
- Citizenship: Russian (until 1918); French (from 1918)
- Education: Imperial University of Warsaw; University of Breslau; University of Göttingen; Ludwig-Maximilians-Universität München
- Known for: Schizophrenia research
- Spouse: Françoise Minkowska (née Franciszka Brokman)
- Awards: Croix de guerre 1914–1918, Chevalier de la Légion d'honneur
- Scientific career
- Fields: Medicine, psychiatry, phenomenology, phenomenology of perception, psychological phenomenology
- Workplaces: Burghölzli Hospital; French Army in World War I Centre hospitalier Sainte-Anne
- Academic advisors: Eugen Bleuler

Eugène Minkowski (French: [øʒɛn mɛ̃kɔfski]; born Eugeniusz Minkowski; 17 April 1885 – 17 November 1972) was a French psychiatrist of Jewish Polish origin, known for his incorporation of phenomenology into psychopathology and for exploring the notion of "lived time". A student of Eugen Bleuler, he was also associated with the work of Ludwig Binswanger and Henri Ey. He was influenced by phenomenological philosophy and the vitalistic philosophy of Henri Bergson, and by the phenomenologists Edmund Husserl and Max Scheler, therefore his work departed from classical medical and psychological models. He was a prolific author in several languages and regarded as a great humanitarian. Minkowski accepted the phenomenological essence of schizophrenia as the "trouble générateur" ("generative disturbance"), which he thought consists in a loss of "vital contact with reality" and shows itself as autism.

== Early life and education ==
Minkowski was born in Saint Petersburg, the capital of the Russian Empire, into a Jewish Polish family. He was second of the four sons of August Minkowski, a Warsaw banker and his wife, Tekla, née Lichtenbaum. When he was 7 years old, the family returned to the Polish capital, where he attended school and started his medical studies at the Imperial University of Warsaw. However, because of political repression from the czarist government, the university was temporarily closed in 1905. He was obliged to continue his studies at the University of Breslau (3 semesters), at the University of Göttingen (2 semesters) and finally, at the Ludwig-Maximilians-Universität München (3 semesters) where he obtained his medical degree in 1909.

== Career ==
As a Russian subject, Minkowski went on to practice medicine in Kazan to obtain Russian certification, and while there met his future wife, Franciszka Brokman, also a doctor and later known as 'Françoise'. They married in 1913. The couple settled in Munich, where Françoise pursued further work in psychiatry while Eugène took up the study of mathematics and philosophy, attending lectures by Alexander Pfänder and Moritz Geiger, pupils of Edmund Husserl.

In Munich, Minkowski became acquainted with Germanic philosophy. The outbreak of World War I forced them to seek refuge in Zurich with Minkowski's brother, Mieczysław (Michel). There, Minkowski and his wife both became assistants to Eugen Bleuler at the Burghölzli, a university clinic where Carl Gustav Jung and Ludwig Binswanger had practised earlier. In 1914 he finished a work entitled "Les éléments essentiels du temps-qualité" – "The Essential Elements of Time-Quality". At the beginning of the World War I Minkowski volunteered in the French Army in 1915 as a military medic. In 1915, the couple had a son, Alexandre Minkowski, later a pioneer of French neonatology and father of the noted orchestra conductor, Marc Minkowski, followed in 1918 by a daughter, Jeannine, a lawyer. In the war he saw action at the Battle of the Somme and the Battle of Verdun, where his bravery earned him several citations and military decorations, including the Croix de Guerre. He became an officer of the Legion of Honour and obtained French nationality. In France Minkowski came under the influence of the famous French philosopher Henri Bergson, who critiqued standard scientific views of time and of life. Minkowski was convinced that psychopathology should be closer to philosophy and closer to individual philosophers' views. For Minkowski, Bergson was the paradigmatic philosopher.

After the war, Minkowski said:

"During the war we were waiting for peace, hoping to take up again the life that we had abandoned. In reality, a new period began, a period of difficulties and disappointments, of setbacks and painful, often fruitless efforts to adapt oneself to new problems of existence. The calm propitious to philosophic thought was far from reborn. Long, arid, and somber years followed the war. My work lay dormant at the bottom of my drawer".

After World War I, when his enlistment came to an end, Minkowski adopted French nationality. The family moved again to Paris permanently and Minkowski returned to medicine and partially abandoned his philosophical pursuits. He worked on the perception of time as a vector in psychopathology, drawing heavily on his unpublished work on Bergson, whom he had known personally. In 1925 he became one of the co-founders of a movement and a French journal in psychiatry, known as "L'Évolution psychiatrique" – "Psychiatric Evolution". "L'Évolution psychiatrique", which introduced the work of Eugen Bleuler and several other psychiatrists, such as Karl Jaspers and Ludwig Binswanger. Directors of "l'Ėvolution psychiatrique" were A. Hesnard and R. Laforgue. Original works and critical studies in the journal have been made by messieurs R. Allendy, A. Borel, A. Ceillier, H. Claude, H. Codet, J. Damourette, A. Hesnard, R. Laforgue, M^{me} F. Minkowska, E. Minkowski, É Pichon, Robin, R. de Saussure, Schiff and J. Vinchon. In 1925 Minkowski contributed articles to the first volume of "L'Ėvolution psychiatrique" : "La Génèse de la Notion de Schizophrénie et ses Caractères Essentiels" – "Genesis of the Notion of Schizophrenia and its Essential Features". As a bonus he published a page about the modern history of psychiatry.

In 1926 he wrote a doctoral thesis on ""La notion de perte de contact avec la réalité et ses applications en psychopathologie"" – The Notion of Loss of Contact with Reality and its Applications in Psychopathology, which was based on the works of Henri Bergson and Eugen Bleuler, and began work at Sainte-Anne's Psychiatric Hospital, a leading mental hospital in Paris. Minkowski thought that autism is the patient's loss of vital contact with reality (perte de contact vital avec la réalité). He distinguished two types of schizophrenic autism: 'rich or florid autism' (autisme riche) & 'poor autism' (autisme pauvre), i.e. autism characterized by affective and cognitive "poverty". But Minkowski disagreed with Bleuler on several points. First, he did not believe that the necessary component of autism is "the predominance of inner fantasy life". In truth, he claimed that a typical schizophrenic patient has the "poor autism", which he characterized by the poverty of affective and cognitive processes. On that subject, he also criticized Bleuler's description of schizophrenic autism together with Emil Kraepelin. Minkowski claimed that "rich autism" happened only when a schizophrenic patient was equipped with an autism-independent inclination toward affective and cognitive expressivity. Just as important, Minkowski considered autism as a both fundamental and primary disorder of schizophrenia. Other psychopathological features of schizophrenia could be comprehended in terms of it.

In 1927 he published "La Schizophrénie" on schizophrenia, followed in 1933, by "Le Temps vécu. Études phénoménologique et psychopathologiques" – "Lived Time. Phenomenological and Psychopathological Studies". In this, his only book so far translated into English, Minkowski sought to use phenomenology as an approach to psychopathology. He proposed that the pathology of patients should always be interpreted in light of their subjective experience of time. Unable initially to find a publisher he funded a thousand copies himself. It was eventually published by J.L.L. d'Artrey to whom Minkowski dedicated the new edition of the work. Minkowski was in the Resistance during World War II and directed the work of a charity to protect children from the Shoah that saved thousands of Jewish children. In 1946 he gave one of the first Basel lectures on psychological suffering during Nazi persecution and went on to testify as an expert witness in numerous subsequent lawsuits. He was the author of some 250 clinical papers and publications. Minkowski died in 1972. His funeral was attended by a large crowd, including his psychiatrist friend and collaborator, Henri Ey.

== Philosophy and psychopathology ==
Philosophically, Minkowski was influenced by Bergson and the phenomenologist Max Scheler, who had developed separate accounts of Time, (see Bergson's 1889 work Time and Free Will and his analyses of the irrational nature of time). Following Bergson's account of élan vital, Minkowski developed what he named as vital energy, an account of the essence of time. He was also attracted by the practice of the Swiss psychiatrist, Eugen Bleuler and attempted to synthesize ideas from psychiatry with philosophy, taking an approach similar to Karl Jaspers. He introduced phenomenology as part of his investigations into psychopathology. He sought thereby to explain the experience of patients who appeared to suffer from distortions of time and/or space. Minkowski's first research into the psychopathology of schizophrenia was inspired by Bergson and appeared in his 1927 work La Schizophrénie, which he thought was "due to a deficiency of intuition, a sense of time and to a progressive hypertrophy of the grasp of spatial factors".

Based on his dissertation, Minkowski considered that schizophrenic patients display a "loss of vital contact with reality" unlike others who experienced life as a "lived synchronism" or what he called "syntony", a notion borrowed from Ernst Kretschmer. According to R.D. Laing, Minkowski made "the first serious attempt in psychiatry to reconstruct the other person's lived experience" and was "the first figure in psychiatry to bring the nature of phenomenological investigations clearly into view". He is quoted on the first page of Laing's classic The Divided Self:

"Je donne une œuvre subjective ici, œuvre cependant qui tend de toutes ses forces vers l'objectivité." I offer you a subjective work, but a work which nevertheless struggles with all its might towards objectivity.

Minkowski was awarded honorary doctorates by the University of Zurich in 1955 and the University of Warsaw in 1965.

== Major works in French ==
- La Notion de perte contact vital avec la réalité et ses applications en psychopathologie (Paris: Jouve, 1926)
- La schizophrénie: Psychopathologie des schizoïdes et des schizophrènes (Paris: Payot, 1927). 2nd, revised and augmented, edition (Paris: Desclée de Brouwer, 1953).
- Le Temps vécu. Étude phénoménologique et psychopathologiques (Paris: D'Artrey, 1933)
- Vers une cosmologie. Fragments philosophiques, (Paris: Aubier-Montaigne, 1936)
- Traité de psychopathologie (Paris: Presses Universitaires de France, 1968)
- Au-delà du rationalisme morbide (Paris: L'Harmattan, 2000)
- Écrits cliniques, (Eres, 2002)

=== Articles in French ===
- 1920 "Famille B... et famille F..., contribution à l'étude de l'hérédité des maladies mentales" (in collaboration with F. Minkowska). Annales médico-psychologiques (Paris), LXXVII, 303–28.
- 1923 "Étude psychologique et analyse phénoménologique d'un cas de mélancolie schizophrénique.", Journal de psychologie normale et pathologique, 20, 543–558.
- "Contribution à l'études des ideés d'influence" (in collaboration with R. Targowla). L'Encéphale, XVIII, No.10, 652–59.
- 1925 "La genèse de la notion de schizophrénie et ses caractères essentiels", L'Évolution psychiatrique.
- 1927 "De la rêverie morbide au délire d'influence", L'Évolution psychiatrique.
- 1938 "Á propos de l'hygiène mentale : Quelques réflexions", Annales médicopsychologiques, avril.
- 1946 "L'Anesthésie affective", Annales Médico-Psychologiques, 104, 80–88.
- 1952 "Le Rorschach dans l'œuvre de F. Minkowska", Bulletin du groupement français du Rorschach.
- 1963 "Vers quels horizons nous emmène Bachelard", Revue Internationale de Philosophie, 17^{e} année, no. 66, fasc 4.
- 1964 "Métaphore et Symbole", Cahiers Internationaux de Symbolisme, n°5.
- 1965 "À l'origine le un et le deux sont-ils nécessairement des nombres ? À propos du monisme et du dualisme", Revue philosophique de Louvain, 63.

== Articles in German ==
- 1911 "Zur Müllerschen Lehre von den spezifischen Sinnesenergien." Zeitschrift für Psychologie und Physiologie der Sinnesorgane (Leipzig), XLV, 129–52.
- 1913 "Die Zenkersche Theorie der Farbenperzeption (Ein Beitrag zur Kenntnis und Beurteilung der physiologischen Farbentheorien)." Zeitsschrift für Psychologie und Physiologie der Sinnesorgane, XLVII, No. 2, 211–22.
- 1914 "Betrachtungen im Anschluss an das Prinzip des psychophysischen Parallelismus". Archiv für die gesamte Psychologie (Leipzig and Berlin), XXXI, 132–243.
- "Inhalt, symbolische Darstellung und Begründung des Grundsatzes der Identität als Grundsatz unseres Vorstellens". Archiv für systematische Philosophie (Berlin), XX, No. 2, 209–19.
- 1923 "Bleuler's Schizoidie und Syntonie und das Zeiterlebnis". Zeitschrift für die gesamte Neurologie und Psychiatrie (Berlin), LXXXII, 212–30.
- "Probleme der Vererbung von Geisteskrankheiten auf Grund von psychiatrischen un genealogischen Untersuchungen an zwei Familien" (in collaboration with F. Minskowska). Schweizer Archiv für Neurologie und Psychiatrie (Zurich), XII, 47–70.

== Major works in English ==
- Lived Time: Phenomenological and Psychopathological Studies, trans. by Nancy Metzel, Northwestern University Press, Evanston. 1970.

=== Articles in English ===
- 1923 "Findings in a Case of Schizophrenic Depression", trans. Barbara Bliss in Existence: A New Dimension in Psychiatry and Psychology. (pp. 127–138) New York, NY, US: Basic Books. Rollo May (ed.), 1958.
- 1926 "Bergson's Conceptions as Applied to Psychopathology", Journal of Nervous and Mental Disease, 63, n°4, juin, 553–568.
- 1947 "The Psychology of the Deportees", American OSE Review 4, Summer-Fall.

== Articles in Polish ==
These include:

- Przyroda, zwierzęcość, człowieczeństwo, bestializm „Przegl. Filoz". R. 44: 1948 – 'Nature, animalism, humankind and bestiality' in the Polish Philosophical Review, 44. 1948
- Psychopatologia i psychologia („Neurologia, Neurochirurgia i Psychiatria Pol". 1956), Z zagadnień schizofrenii (tamże 1957) – 'Psychopathology and Psychology' in the Polish Journal of Neurology, Neurosurgery, and Psychiatry. 1956.
- Prostota (w: „Szkice filozoficzne Romanowi Ingardenowi w darze", W.–Kr. 1964) – 'Simplicity' in Philosophical Sketches dedicated to Roman Ingarden, Kraków, 1964.

== Articles in Spanish ==
- 1933 "La Psiquiatria en 1932" (in collaboration with P. Guiraud). Revista de criminologia, psiquiatria y medicina légal (Buenos Aires), XX, 322–37.
- "La Psiquiatria en 1933" (in collaboration with P. Guiraud). Revista de criminologia, XXI, 250–364.
