= Danièle Brun =

French academic and psychologist (1938–2023)

- Born: 6 July 1938
- Died: 3 January 2023 (aged 84)
- Education: Paris Diderot University; University of Vincennes
- Occupations: Professor; Psychologist

Danièle Brun (6 July 1938 – 3 January 2023) was a French academic and psychologist. She was a member of the Espace analytique.

== Biography ==
Brun first studied English and German at the University of Paris before completing her studies in psychology at Paris Diderot University and the University of Vincennes. She had also enrolled at Paris Descartes University.

Brun began teaching the Rorschach test and the thematic apperception test as a lecturer at the New Sorbonne University under the direction of Juliette Favez-Boutonnier. In 1989, she defended her thesis, titled Psychopathologie de la guérison à propos de la guérison chez l'enfant. She then worked as a psychoanalyst at the Paris Psychoanalytic Society, where she was a member of the board of directors. From 1988 to 1998, she was a psychoanalyst at the Centre Édouard Claparède in Neuilly-sur-Seine.

Brun owned a clinical practice in child psychiatry at the Hôpital Saint-Vincent de Paul and in adult psychiatry at the Hôpital Paul Brousse. She also worked as a psychologist in adult hematology at the Hôtel-Dieu in Paris and in child oncology at the Institut Gustave Roussy. In 2001, she was a founding member of the Centre de recherches psychanalyse et médecine, as well as the Société de médecine et psychanalyse the year prior.

In 2011, Brun organized a seminar on the status of women in medicine, which had its lectures published by the Institut Émilie-du-Châtelet. She was a contributor to the Dictionnaire international de psychanalyse, directed by Alain de Mijolla.

Brun died on 3 January 2023, at the age of 84.

== Works ==
- L’Enfant donné pour mort (1989)
- La Maternité et le Féminin (1990)
- Mikael, un enfant en analyse (1997)
- Le Corps (2003)
- La Passion dans l’amitié (2005)
- Les Enfants perturbateurs (2007)
- Mères majuscules (2011)
- L’Insidieuse Malfaisance du père (2013)
- Une part de soi dans la vie des autres (2015)
- Rester freudien avec Lacan (2016)

== Filmography ==
- Par elles-mêmes (Antenne 2, 1980)
- La psy dans tous ses états : qu’est devenue la psychanalyse un siècle après l’invention de Freud (France 3, 1999)
