= Jean-Joseph Tricot-Royer =

Jean-Joseph Tricot-Royer (b. Vilvoorde, Belgium, 20 September 1875; d. Poederlee, Lille, Belgium, 6 July 1951) was a Belgian physician, dentist and historian of medicine. He was the founding president of the International Society for the History of Medicine from 1921 to 1930.

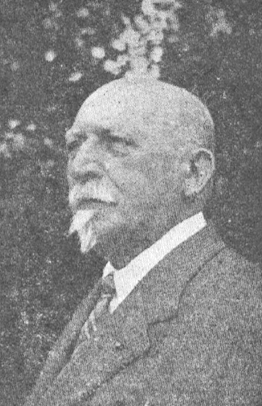
Jean-Joseph Tricot-Royer towards the end of his life

== Life and work ==
After graduating in medicine at the Catholic University of Leuven in 1899, he shortly worked as a country doctor in Beauvechain, near Bruxelles. Then, in the early 20th century he transferred to Paris where he worked in the histology laboratory of Mathias-Marie Duval.

Later, he became interested in dentistry and, after specializing in it, he opened a successful dental studio in Antwerp where he settled permanently.

Thanks to his wealthy situation, he was able to travel extensively in America and the East, thus broadening his cultural and historical interests. He always maintained close ties with Paris and it was there that he met his future wife, the daughter of painter Lionel Royer.

In 1914, at the Sorbonne, he gave a historical conference on the occasion of the fourth centenary of the birth of Andreas Vesal. It was a great success, and that moment was influential in increasingly directing Tricot's interests towards medical history. During the dark years of the First World War he began to conceive the project of creating opportunities for meeting and exchange between historians of medicine from all over the world, and for this reason he organized the first International Congress for the History of Medicine, which was held in Antwerp in August 1920. The following year, during a second Congress in Paris (1-7 July 1921), he was among the founders of the International Society for the History of Medicine who acclaimed him as their first president.

In 1925, Leuven University named him Maître de conférences and entrusted him with a course in the history of medicine. It was the first on the subject after more than forty years. In 1950, he enriched the same university of a medical history museum.

== Bibliography ==
- Franz-André Sondervorst, “Le Docteur J.J.G.Tricot Royer, Maitre de Conférences à la Faculté de Médecine“, Annuaire Université Catholique de Louvain, 1951-1952, pp. CLXV-CLXXII
- Franz-André Sondervorst, “J.J.G.Tricot-Royer (1875-1951)", Le Scalpel - Journal Belge des Sciences Medicales, 104(28), 14 Juillet 1951, pp. 783-789
- Maxime Laignel-Lavastine, “Jean-Joseph-Ghislain Tricot-Royer", Le Scalpel - Journal Belge des Sciences Medicales, 106(27), 4 Juillet 1953, pp. 758-765
