= Paris Psychoanalytic Society =

French psychoanalytical organization

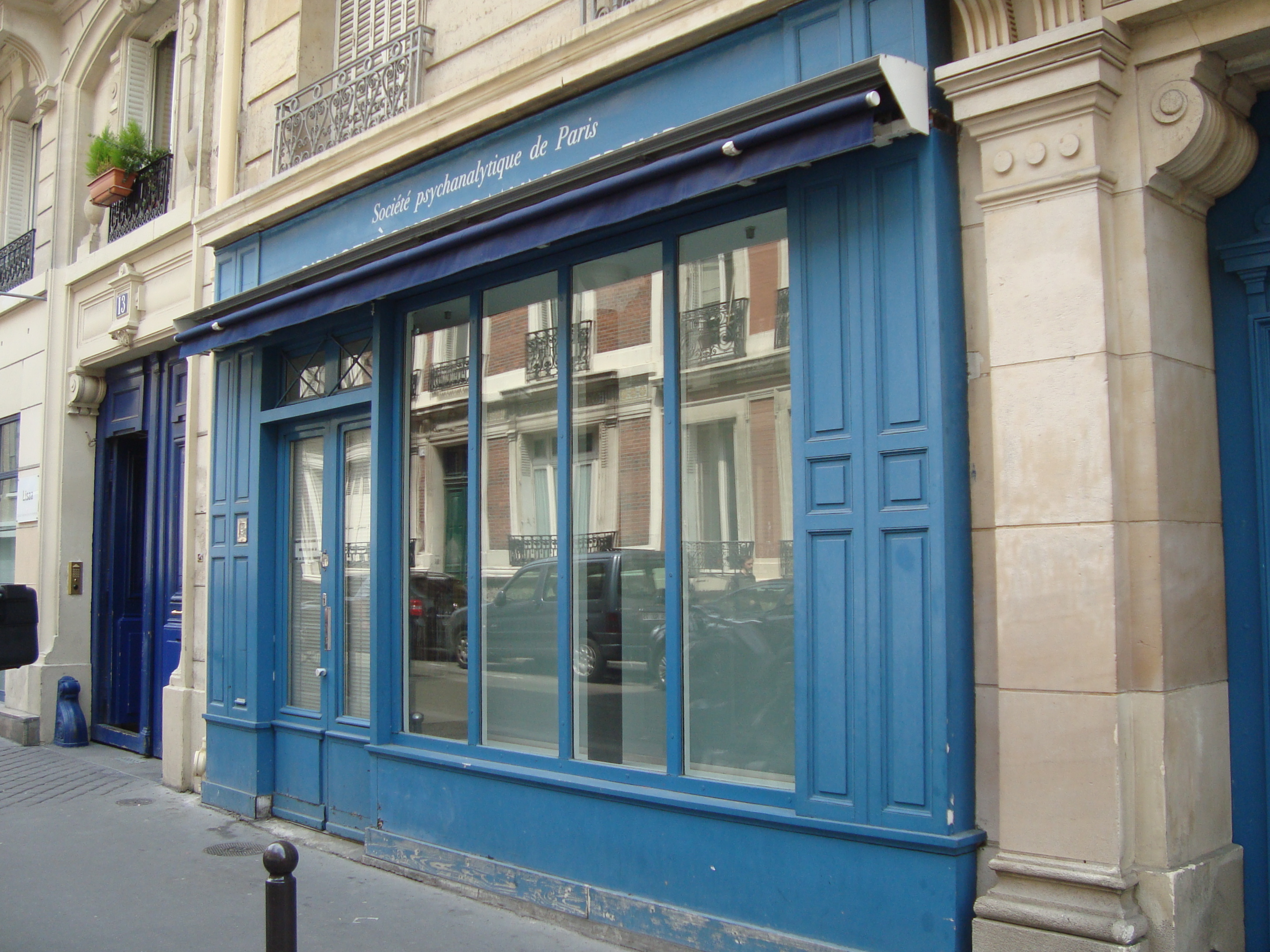
- Société psychanalytique de Paris

The Paris Psychoanalytical Society (SPP) is the oldest psychoanalytical organisation in France. Founded with Freud’s endorsement in 1926, the S.P.P. is a component member of the International Psychoanalytical Association (IPA) as well as of the European Psychoanalytical Federation (EPF).

== History ==
Sigmund Freud’s French contemporaries initially neglected the significance of psychoanalysis. Between 1910 and 1918 there was marginal interest, with some publications and translations by Emmanuel Régis and Angelo Hesnard. Analytical practice was introduced by Morichau Beauchant in Poitiers, but without national impact. It wasn’t until 1920, with the arrival in Paris of one of Freud’s students, Eugénie Sokolnicka, that psychoanalysis began to influence Parisian literary circles, and then, gradually, doctors and psychiatrists.

The Société psychanalytique de Paris was founded on November 4, 1926. One of its founders, René Laforgue, had corresponded with Freud and had referred the Princess Marie Bonaparte to him for analysis and ultimately training. The arrival in Paris of Rudolph Loewenstein, trained at the Berlin Psychoanalytic Institute, would permit the incorporation of the fledgling group, initially of nine then twelve, members (René Allendy, Marie Bonaparte, Adrien Borel, Angelo Hesnard, René Laforgue, Rudolph Loewenstein, Édouard Pichon, Eugénie Sokolnicka). Disputes among the founders as to the place of Freud’s ideas in France were rampant. The first Institute of Psychoanalysis opened in 1934, with Ernest Jones giving the inaugural address, and congratulatory telegrams from Freud and Max Eitingon.

Following the Nazi invasion of Austria, Marie Bonaparte was instrumental in facilitating the emigration of Sigmund Freud and his family. It is thanks to the tireless efforts of the Princess, that Freud’s letters and early manuscripts to Fleiss were saved.

The war disorganised the Paris Psychoanalytical Society. The Institute closed in the spring of 1940. Loewenstein fled to the United States where he settled permanently. Laforgue, originally from Alsace, attempted to collaborate with the nazified Berlin Institute. Others (e.g. Sacha Nacht) fled to the free zone in the south or resisted actively (e.g. Paul Schiff). Few analysts (e.g. John Leuba) were able to maintain their activity.

With the end of the hostilities, although reduced in number, psychoanalysts returned to Paris. The question of teaching psychoanalysis and training new analysts arose, as well as corollary issues regarding the organisation of a training institute: independence or connection with the University, and what modality the training should encompass.

The debates concluded with the opening of the Institute of Psychoanalysis on March 5, 1953, and an official inauguration ceremony on June 1, 1954. Profound disagreements about training subsisted however, particularly between Daniel Lagache and Sacha Nacht each of whom held diverging views regarding the place of University teaching within psychoanalysis. In addition, Jacques Lacan had begun a technical shift consisting of varying the length of session times, most frequently making them very short, provoking the mistrust of other members of the Society. These tensions resulted in the departure of a small group, gathered around Daniel Lagache and subsequently joined by Jacques Lacan. This group resigned from the S.P.P., and founded the “Société Française de Psychanalyse” (S.F.P.). Having resigned from the SPP without maintaining their membership in the I.P.A., the members of the S.F.P. had to apply for membership in the I.P.A. The latter refused to recognise the practice of shortened session times and refused to recognise the S.F.P.

In 1964, Lacan left the S.F.P., along with several of his students. The Association Psychanalytique de France (A.P.F.), which took into account the criteria of the I.P.A., was born from this split. The first “Lacanian” group emerged, the École Freudienne de Paris. Despite multiple splits (most notably in 1969 with the creation of the “Organisation psychanalytique de langue française” (O.P.L.F.), also known as the “Quatrième Groupe”, which maintained ties with the S.P.P.), the Lacanian movement spread. Conflicts multiplied and following the death of Lacan, the movement broke into multiple groups.

During this troubled period, the Paris Psychoanalytical Society pursued its development, training numerous analysts who have profoundly influenced the course of psychoanalysis in France. Many new areas of psychoanalytic research and treatment have emerged from the work of its members (See section on “Perspectives”, below). The Paris Psychoanalytical Society maintains close and regular contact with the Association Psychanalytique de France, the Quatrième Groupe and the Société Psychanalytique de Recherche et de Formation (S.P.R.F.), a new I.P.A. study group formed after a split in the O.P.L.F.

== The SPP today: organisation ==
The Paris Psychoanalytical Society is a private, non-profit organization which, since 1997, is recognized as contributing to the public good. Its funding comes exclusively from membership fees and private donations. The S.P.P. has approximately 800 members and roughly 300 analysts in training. The Administrative Council, with its President and board are elected for two year terms. The Scientific secretaries work closely with the Scientific and Technical Council, also elected for two year terms. The most important scientific meeting is the annual “Congress of French speaking Psychoanalysts” in which French speaking I.P.A. analysts from the world over participate. Analysts trained at one of the Institutes of the S.P.P. work throughout France and abroad. In several regions of France, S.P.P. analysts have constituted groups for local members and students as well as proposing scientific activities open to the public. In Lyon, the local group counts more than 100 members and houses its own training facility: The Lyon Institute of Psychoanalysis. The Centre for Research and Psychoanalytic Information (C.R.I.P.) receives individuals seeking information about psychoanalysis. The other Regional associations of the S.P.P. are the: Toulouse Group of Psychoanalysis, which has a training centre, Mediterranean Group, Aquitaine Group, Brittany-Loire Country Group, Burgundy – Franche-Comté Group, Normandy Group and the Northern Group.

== Perspectives ==
Analysts trained at the S.P.P. have a profound connection to Freud’s teaching. Well versed in post-Freudian theories, no other theory is considered to offer an understanding of the human psyche which is as complete. Many French theoreticians have made contributions which complement Freud’s theory and delve into what were hitherto unexplored regions of the mind and body. Until about 1970, psychoanalytic questions and reflections were primarily focussed on dreams and desire; issues which were rooted in Freud’s topographical theory. For some time now, Freud’s second, structural theory has been at the heart of clinical research and questions regarding destructivity (Jean Bergeret, Paul Denis, André Green), masochism (Benno Rosenberg), negative therapeutic reaction, narcissism (André Green, Bela Grunberger), object relations (Maurice Bouvet), perversion (Michel De M’Uzan, Joyce McDougall, Janine Chasseguet-Smirgel), psychosomatic problems (Pierre Marty, Michel Fain, Christian David, and Michel de M’Uzan), the third (A. Green), psychic figurability (Sára Botella and Cesar Botella), child analysis (René Diatkine, Evelyne Kestemberg and Jean Kestemberg, Serge Lebovici, Superego (Jean-Luc Donnet) have been explored by SPP analysts.

== Goals ==
In his 1922 Encyclopaedia article (S.E. XVIII pp. 235–259), Freud states: "Psychoanalysis" is the name:

1. of a procedure for the investigation of mental processes which are almost inaccessible in any other way,
2. of a method (based upon that investigation) for the treatment of neurotic disorders and
3. of a collection of psychological information obtained along those lines, which is gradually being accumulated into a new scientific discipline.

In accordance with the I.P.A., of which it is a component member, the SPP considers that the transmission of Psychoanalysis can only be effectuated within the framework of an Institution. It is through its Institutes of Psychoanalysis, responsible to the Training and Education Commission, that the Paris Psychoanalytical Society ensures the transmission of Psychoanalysis. Psychoanalytical training consist of:

- a personal analysis;
- supervised analyses;
- theoretical and technical seminars.

== Training at the Paris Psychoanalytical Society ==
The structure of training at the S.P.P. is an “open” one. The training commission, composed of the supervising analysts, defines the general training orientation.

The fundamental and primary condition is a personal analysis, with a member of the S.P.P. or with a training analyst of another I.P.A. Society. When an individual believes that his or her personal analysis has advanced enough, (he may or may not have terminated) he or she may submit his candidature for the training proper, at one of the Institutes. The candidature will be examined by a minimum of three members of the Training Commission. This Commission, after deliberating on the subject’s capacities of auto-analysis, of listening and of perceiving the unconscious of an other, accepts, differs or refuses the candidate.

If accepted, the candidate becomes an “analyst in training”. He undertakes a minimum of two supervised analyses with weekly supervision from a supervising analyst.

At the same time, the analyst in training must integrate, based on his accruing experience, the corpus of psychoanalysis’ theoretical knowledge. Reading and critical discussion of Freud’s work constitute the fundamental reference to which is added and articulated in cross reference, his followers and contemporary researchers. At the end of his training, following its “validation” by the Training Commission, the newly accepted psychoanalyst may request membership in the Society.

== Categories of members ==
The SPP counts about 800 active members, accepted from analysts trained at its Psychoanalytic Institutes. Depending on their involvement in the responsibilities of the Society they are:

- Adhérents

Adhérents are members who have been accepted by the Society following validation of their training at one of the Institutes of psychoanalysis, and who have accepted the ethical code of the SPP. They are associate members.

- Titulaires

Titulaires are members who have been elected either on the basis of a clinical-theoretical text, or a collection of clinical psychoanalytical texts. They are full members of the I.P.A. Supervising analysts (formateurs) are elected from the pool of full members. They are members of the teaching committee, whose specific task and responsibility is to supervise and transmit clinical psychoanalysis and its corollary, psychoanalytical research.

- Honoraires

These are SPP members who have decreased or limited their professional activity.

- Correspondent

Corresponding members are members who have either been trained at the S.P.P. and now live abroad, or are colleagues who through their affinity with the S.P.P. and its model wish to be kept informed of its activities.

== The Jean Favreau Centre for Consultation and Psychoanalytic Treatment (CCTP) ==
Inaugurated concomitantly with the Institute of Psychoanalysis in 1954, the Jean Favreau Centre for consultation and psychoanalytic treatment (CCTP) provides psychoanalytic treatment to the larger Parisian community, for people whose economic precariousness would make seeking private treatment difficult or impossible. From its inception, the legitimacy of the CCTP was based in its close collaboration with the Institute of Psychoanalysis. Both the Director of the Institute, Sacha Nacht, and the first Medical director, Cénac, wished to provide an outpatient clinic run and supervised by experienced psychoanalysts. Initially, treatment was carried out by analysts in training, who received in return, supervision from senior analysts. Since 1958 Paris city health officials have formally recognised the strictly psychoanalytic vocation of the treatment to be provided so that although all treatment is free, every analyst working at the CCTP is remunerated, preserving the asymmetry of the patient analyst relation. At the CCTP every patient is initially seen by a consultant, who determines the appropriate indication: psychoanalysis, psychotherapy, psychodrama or group psychotherapy or referral to a private analyst. The treating analyst is thus not the consultant analyst. Working with a diverse population, offering a diversity of psychoanalytically based treatments, the CCTP exemplifies a public clinic which fulfils Freud’s 1922 description of psychoanalysis: carrying out psychoanalytic treatment, investigating “mental processes”, and on the basis of the latter, the psychoanalysts at the CCTP have developed a research method.

== The Sigmund Freud Library ==
The birth of the SPP’s Sigmund Freud library (BSF) is closely entwined with the founding of the Institute of Psychoanalysis, both of which were in large part made possible thanks to the generosity of Marie Bonaparte. From the mid nineteen fifties on, developing a library and a catalogue and above all, translating Freud into French were major preoccupations. In 1962 Marie Bonaparte donated several thousand books to the library, including several which were personally dedicated and annotated by Freud as well as a collection of rare German journals. In 1992, the SPP purchased the workshop of a cabinet maker and transformed it into what was officially named the Sigmund Freud Library. In 1997, the SPP began computerising its catalogue and has thus been able, thanks to the internet, to make its resources available to the public. Psychiatrists, psychologists and researchers the world over visit on-line resources of the BSF (as well as its premises) profiting from its unusually large catalogue.

== Publications ==
- Revue française de Psychanalyse (RFP), founded in 1927, is published by the S.P.P. and is currently edited by the Presses Universitaires de France. Five volumes are published annually, three of which are on themes chosen by the editorial committee, and two others are devoted to conferences sponsored by the S.P.P. The R.F.P. is digitalised and available on line at the BSF or at on-line resources of the BNF.
- Monographies et Débats de Psychanalyse: this series aims to provide reflections on targeted themes, providing a clear and concise perspective in a manageable size to general readers, students and psychoanalysts.

== Bibliography ==
- Laplanche, J. and Pontalis, J.-B. (1973), The Language of Psychoanalysis, Norton, translated by Donald Nicholson-Smith.
- LeGuen, C. (2009), Dictionnaire Freudien, Paris, PUF.
- de Mijolla, A. (2001), Splits in the French psychoanalytic movement between 1953 and 1964, in R. Steiner & J. Johns Within, Time and Beyond Time, London, Karnac Books, 1-24.
- de Mijolla, A. (2002), International Dictionary of Psychoanalysis, New York, Thomson Gale, 2005.
- Perron, R. (1988), Histoire de la Psychanalyse, Paris, PUF, Collection "Que sais-je ?".
