= Denial =

Assertion that a statement is false

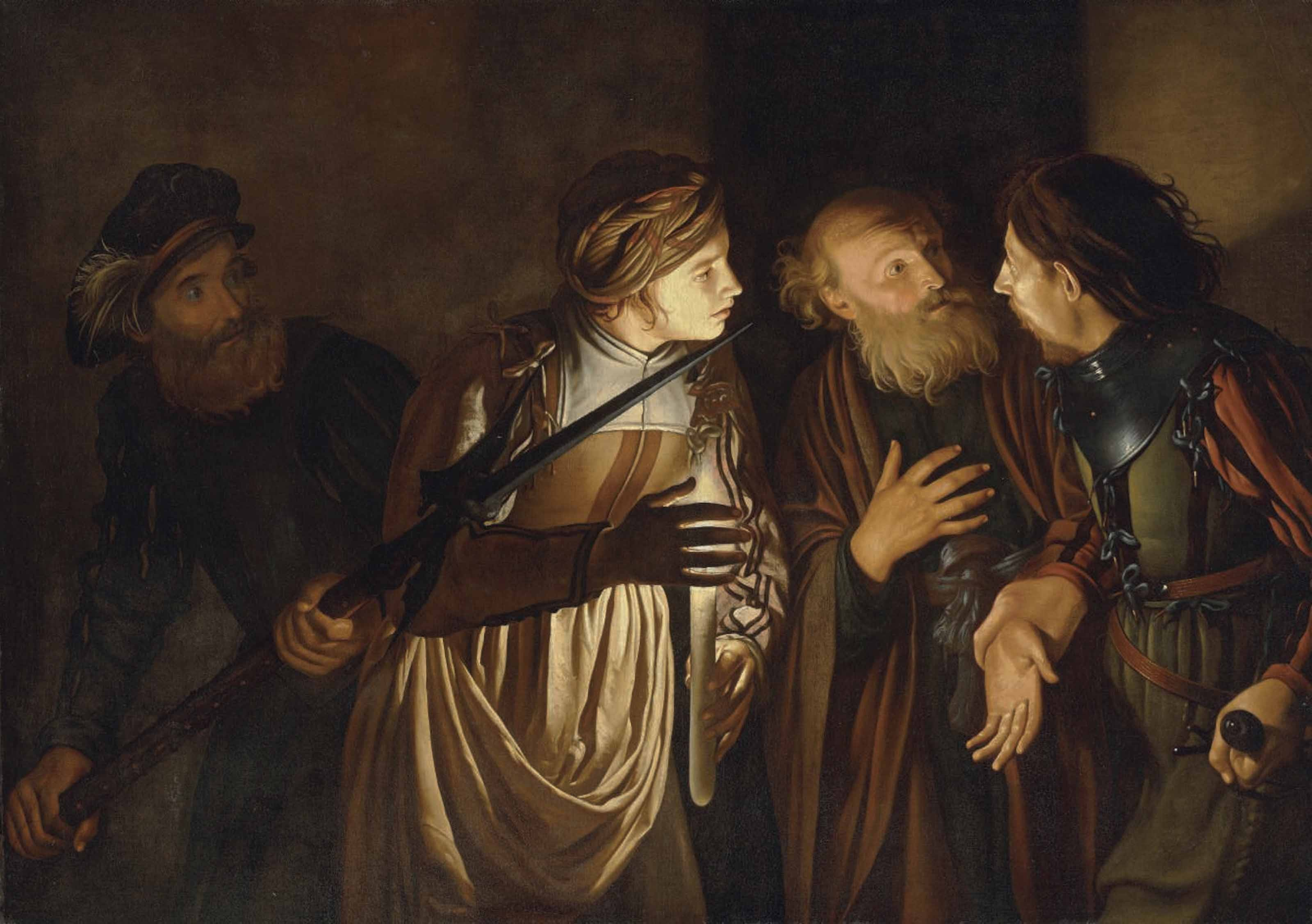
A 17th century painting depicting the Denial of Peter, found in the four Gospels in the New Testament. In it, Peter denies having associated with Jesus, who is being sought by authorities.

Denial, in colloquial English usage, has at least three meanings:

- the assertion that any particular statement or allegation, whose truth is uncertain, is not true;
- the refusal of a request; and
- the assertion that a true statement is false.

In psychology, denialism is a person's choice to deny reality as a way to avoid a psychologically uncomfortable truth.

In psychoanalytic theory, denial is a defense mechanism in which a person is faced with a fact that is too uncomfortable to accept and rejects it instead, insisting that it is not true despite what may be overwhelming evidence. The concept of denial is important in twelve-step programs, where the abandonment or reversal of denial that substance dependence is problematic forms the basis of the first, fourth, fifth, eighth, and tenth steps.

People who are exhibiting symptoms of a serious medical condition sometimes deny or ignore those symptoms because the idea of having a serious health problem is uncomfortable or disturbing. The American Heart Association cites denial as a principal reason that treatment of a heart attack is delayed. Because the symptoms are so varied, and often have other potential explanations, the opportunity exists for the patient to deny the reality of the emergency, often with fatal consequences. It is common for patients to delay recommended mammograms or other tests because of a fear of cancer, although this usually worsens the long-term medical outcome.

== Psychology ==
Initial short-term denial can be a good thing, giving time to adjust to a painful or stressful issue. It might also be a precursor to making some sort of change in one's life. But denial can also be harmful; if denial persists and prevents a person from taking appropriate action, it's a harmful response.

== In political and economic contexts ==
Some people who have been known to be in denial of historical or scientific facts accepted by the mainstream of society or by experts, for political or economic reasons, have been referred to as denialists or true believers. Examples of denialism in this context include:

- Climate change denial
- Denial of evolution
- Election denial movement in the United States
- Historical negationism (such as Holocaust denial)
- HIV/AIDS denialism
- Modern flat Earth societies

== In religious contexts ==
In the New Testament, the Jewish Sadducee sect is noted for its denial of beliefs held by other sections of the Jewish community: they did not believe in the resurrection of the dead or the existence of angels and spirits.

== See also ==
- Closed circle
- Closeted
- Cognitive dissonance
- Confirmation bias
- Cover-up
- Deniable encryption
- Foreclosure
- Lie
- Moral blindness
- Narcissistic defence sequences
- Non-apology apology
- Non-denial denial
- Plausible deniability
- Polite fiction
- Scotomization
- Self-deception
- Self-fulfilling prophecy
- Skepticism
- The Politics of Denial
- Willful blindness
