= The Closed Circle =

The Closed Circle may refer to:

- The Closed Circle (novel), a novel by Jonathan Coe
- The Closed Circle: An Interpretation of the Arabs, a book by David Pryce-Jones

== See also ==
- Closed circle, a type of argument that is unfalsifiable
- Closed circle of suspects, a common element in detective fiction
