= Françoise Dolto =

French pediatrician and psychoanalyst

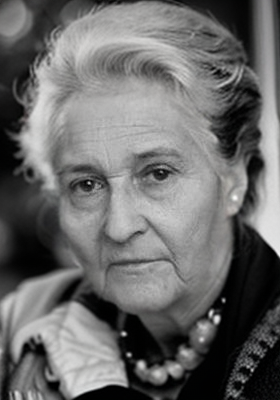
- Born: Françoise Marette; November 6, 1908; Paris, France
- Died: August 25, 1988 (aged 79); Paris, France
- Resting place: Bourg-la-Reine
- Spouse: Boris Dolto
- Children: 3, including Carlos
- Scientific career
- Fields: Pediatrics, psychoanalysis

Françoise Dolto (French: [dɔlto]; November 6, 1908 – August 25, 1988) was a French pediatrician and psychoanalyst.

== Biography ==
Françoise Dolto was born as Françoise Marette, into an affluent, devoutly Catholic, royalist and Maurrassian family in Paris. Her Alsatian mother, Suzanne Demmler, was the daughter of an engineer, and Henri Marette, her father, was also a polytechnicien engineer who became an industrialist. She was the fourth child of a family of seven. Her brother Jacques Marette (1922–1984), was French Postmaster (minister of Posts and Telecommunications) from 1962 to 1967.

An Irish nurse frequently took care of her when she was a baby and developed a close bond with her, to the point that her parents then had to learn to speak English to get her to smile. Her parents fired the nurse when she was 8 months old, for a grave mistake: in order to finance her addiction to opium, which was popular in Belle Époque Paris, she would prostitute herself at an establishment where she would leave baby Françoise's pram unattended at the door.

Her personal tutor was trained in the methods of Friedrich Fröbel. When she was eight her uncle and godfather Pierre Demmler died in World War I. When she was twelve, she was very affected by the death of her older sister Jacqueline, her mother's favorite child. Her mother sank into a depression and accused her of not praying hard enough for her sister's life. Dolto's mother felt that a girl had no other prospects than marriage and therefore forbade her to pursue her studies. At sixteen she had to confront her mother, who did not want her to pass her baccalaureate because she would then not be able to get married. Nevertheless, Dolto attended the Lycée Molière in Paris where she graduated in philosophy in 1924–1925. In 1930 she obtained a nursing degree. A year later, she began her medical studies with her brother Philip, "paying for her studies with the money she earns".

Dolto was named by Michel Foucault as one of the prominent signatories of the 1977 French petition against age of consent laws.

Françoise Dolto was the mother of Carlos (1943–2008), a singer, Grégoire (born 1944), an engineer, and Catherine (born 1946).

== Psychoanalysis ==
In 1932, Marc Schlumberger introduced Dolto to psychoanalyst René Laforgue, who had already begun to treat her brother Philip a year earlier. She participated thereby in the beginnings of French Freudianism. At the end of February 1934, she began a three-year analysis with Laforgue, which had a major impact on her life, helping to free her of her neurosis – of her education, her origin, and her depressive mother. Laforgue found that Dolto had an aptitude for analysis, and advised her to become a psychoanalyst, something which she at first rejected in favor of devoting herself to medicine.

During her medical training, working under Dr. Georges Heuyer, she met Sophie Morgenstern, who was the first to practice psychoanalysis with children in France, and who would subsequently be a mentor for her. She listened to the sick children who came to her for treatment, Dolto began (with the encouragement of Edouard Pichon) to specialise in child psychology, as a psychoanalytic pediatrician. Her patients were mostly children with psychoses, with whom she began to develop her own idiosyncratic kind of treatment.

Her speciality was learning about the early mental stages of babies and children, notably their first experiences and methods of communication through their body. She emphasized the physical aspects of the mother-baby dyad, and stressed the importance of observation and understanding of the means of communication used by children with psychological problems, or learning and social disabilities. Her work on the unconscious body image – on the way children have a body-language before actual language – has been especially influential, being developed by, among others, Maud Mannoni. In 2013 her work was translated into English by Francoise Hivernel.

Dolto was a close friend and ally of Jacques Lacan, who she accompanied into the "École Freudienne de Paris". She considered that "it was among those analysed by Lacan that I found those best able to understand children and...ready to understand the needs of a child, even a very young one, as a subject with a desire to express".

== Death ==
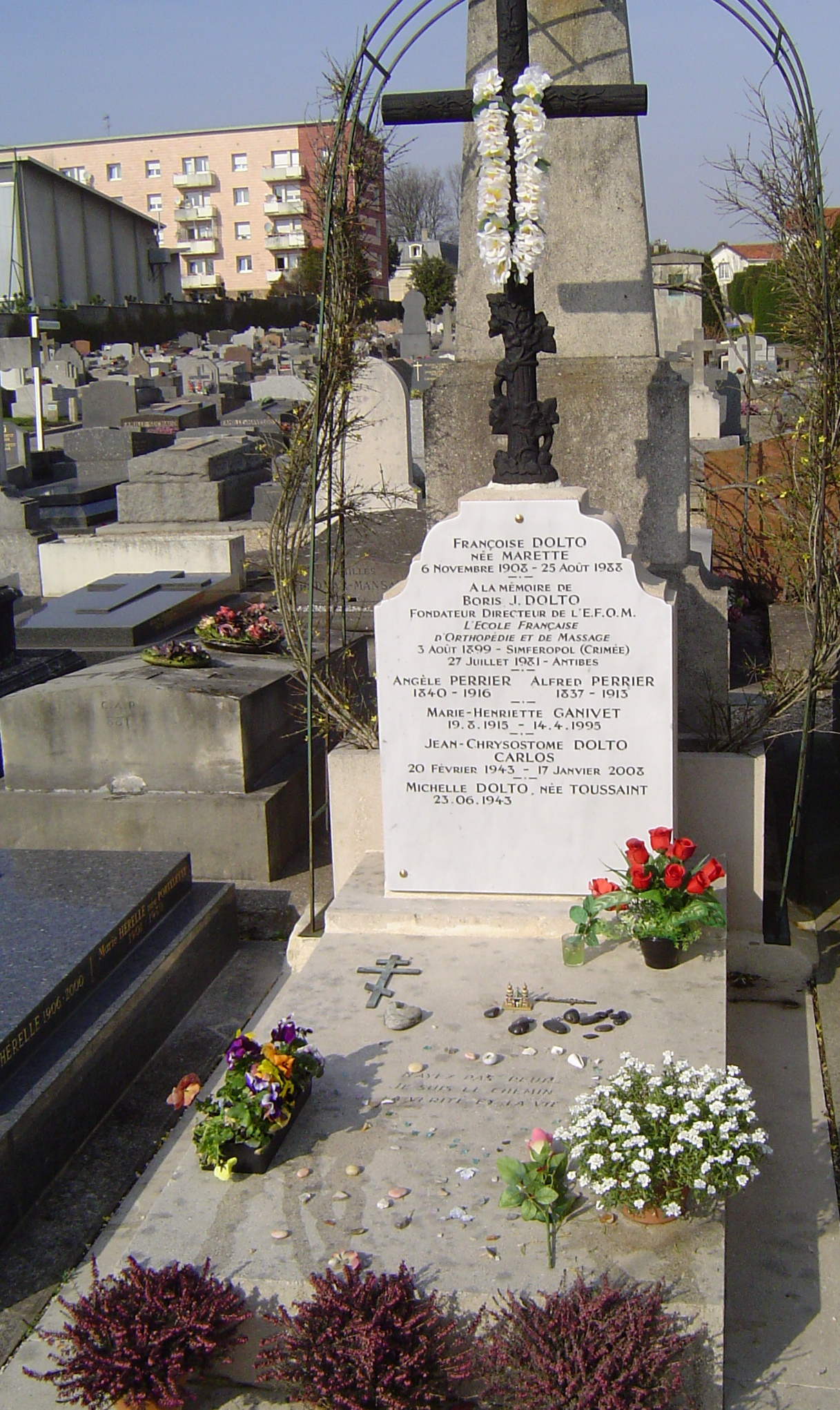
Grave of Françoise Dolto

Dolto contracted pulmonary fibrosis in 1984. She died on 25 August 1988 and was buried in the cemetery at Bourg-la-Reine alongside her husband Boris Dolto. This is also the burial place of their son, the singer Carlos, who died in 2008. On her tomb stone is inscribed: "Have no fear! I am the Path, the Truth and the Life"

== Bibliography ==
- Psychanalyse et pédiatrie, medical thesis, 1971
- Le Cas Dominique, Éditions du Seuil (éd. du Seuil), Paris, 1971; engl. Dominique: Analysis of an Adolescent, Souvenir Press, 1974
- L'Évangile au risque de la psychanalyse (interviewed by Gérard Sévérin, philosopher, theologian, psychoanalyst), éd. Jean-Pierre Délarge, 1977
- Au jeu du désir, éd. du Seuil, Paris, 1981
- Séminaire de psychanalyse d'enfants (coop. Louis Caldaguès), éd. du Seuil, Paris, 1982, ISBN 2-02-006274-7
- Sexualité féminine, éd. Scarabée/A. M. Métailié, 1982
- L'image inconsciente du corps, éd. du Seuil, Paris, 1984. ISBN 2-02-018302-1
- Séminaire de psychanalyse d'enfants (coop. Jean-François de Sauverzac), éd. du Seuil, Paris, 1985, ISBN 2-02-008980-7
- Solitude, éd. Vertiges, Paris, 1985, ISBN 2-86896-026-X
- La Cause des enfants, éd. Robert Laffont, Paris, 1985, ISBN 2-221-04285-9
- Enfances, Paris, 1986
- Libido féminine, éd. Carrère, Paris, 1987
- L'Enfant du miroir (with Juan David Nasio), éd. Rivages, Paris, 1987, ISBN 2-86930-056-5
- La Cause des adolescents, éd. Robert Laffont, Paris, 1988
- Quand les parents se séparent (coop. Inès de Angelino), éd. du Seuil, Paris, 1988, ISBN 2-02-010298-6; engl. When Parents Separate, David R Godine Pub, 1997
- L'Échec scolaire, éd. Vertiges du Nord, 1989
- Autoportrait d'une psychanalyste, éd. du Seuil, Paris, 1989
- Paroles pour adolescents ou le complexe du homard, éd. Hattier, 1989
- Lorsque l'enfant paraît, éd. du Seuil, Paris, 1990
- Les Étapes majeures de l'enfance, éd. Gallimard, Paris, 1994
- Les Chemins de l'éducation, éd. Gallimard, Paris, 1994
- La Difficulté de vivre, éd. Gallimard, Paris, 1995
- Tout est langage, éd. Gallimard, Paris, 1995
- Le sentiment de soi : aux sources de l'image et du corps, éd. Gallimard, Paris, 1997
- Le Féminin, éd. Gallimard, Paris, 1998
- La vague et l'océan : séminaire sur les pulsions de mort (1970-1971), éd. Gallimard, Paris, 2003
- Lettres de jeunesse : correspondance, 1913-1938, éd. Gallimard, Paris; revised and augmented in 2003, ISBN 2-07-073261-4
- Une vie de correspondances : 1938-1988, éd. Gallimard, Paris, 2005, ISBN 2-07-074256-3
- Une psychanalyste dans la cité. L'aventure de la Maison verte, éd. Gallimard, Paris, 2009, ISBN 978-2-07-012257-8

== See also ==
- Juliette Favez-Boutonnier
