= Diamantopoulos =

Diamantopoulos or Diamandopoulos (Greek: Διαμαντόπουλος) is a Greek surname. The feminine form is Diamantopoulou (Διαμαντοπούλου). It may refer to:

- Adamantios Diamantopoulos (born 1958), Greek-British business scholar
- Anna Diamantopoulou (born 1959), Greek politician
- Athanasios Diamandopoulos (born 1943), Greek physician
- Chris Diamantopoulos (born 1975), Canadian actor
- Constantine Diamantopoulos, fighter of the Greek War of Independence
- Costas Diamantopoulos (b. 1940), Greek football player
- Costas Diamantopoulos (b. 1946), Greek basketball player and coach
- Diamantis Diamantopoulos (1914–1995), Greek painter
- Dimitris Diamantopoulos (born 1988), Greek association football player
- Evangelos Diamantopoulos (born 1980), Greek MP elected in June 2012
- Georgios Diamantopoulos (fighter), fighter of the Greek War of Independence
- Giorgos Diamantopoulos (born 1980), Greek basketball player
- Iakovos Diamantopoulos (1905–1993), Greek physician and politician
- Stavros Diamantopoulos (born 1947), Greek football manager
- Takis Diamantopoulos (born 1939), Greek photographer
- Thanassis Diamantopoulos, Greek political scholar
- Vasilis Diamantopoulos (1920–1999), Greek actor
