= René Diatkine =

French psychiatrist (1919–1997)

René Diatkine (6 April 1918, in Paris – 2 November 1997, in Garches) was a French psychiatrist and psychoanalyst, best remembered for his work in psychosis, and his collaborative work with Julian de Ajuriaguerra in Geneva, Jacques Lacan at the Paris Psychoanalytic Society, and Sacha Nacht. He was the chairman of the Paris Psychoanalytic Society from 1972 to 1973.
