= Evelyne Kestemberg =

French psychoanalyst

Evelyne Kestemberg-Hassin (French: [kɛstɛmɡɛʁg]; 28 May 1918 – 17 April 1989) was a French psychoanalyst. She was born in Constantinople to a Turkish father and a Russian-Jewish mother, and died in Paris. She was a former president and full member of the Paris Psychoanalytical Society, known by its French acronym SPP.

== Biography ==
Kestemberg moved to Paris with her family shortly after birth. She left occupied France in 1942 to move to Casablanca, where she met and later married Jean Kestemberg, before they left together for Mexico.

She was a trained philosopher as well as a psychoanalyst. She was first analysed by Marc Schlumberger and decided to dedicate her life to psychoanalysis. She was tutored by Sacha Nacht, who was against her admission to the SPP given she was not a trained physician. She became the first woman who was not a medical doctor to be admitted in 1963.
