= The Counterfeiters (novel) =

1925 novel by André Gide

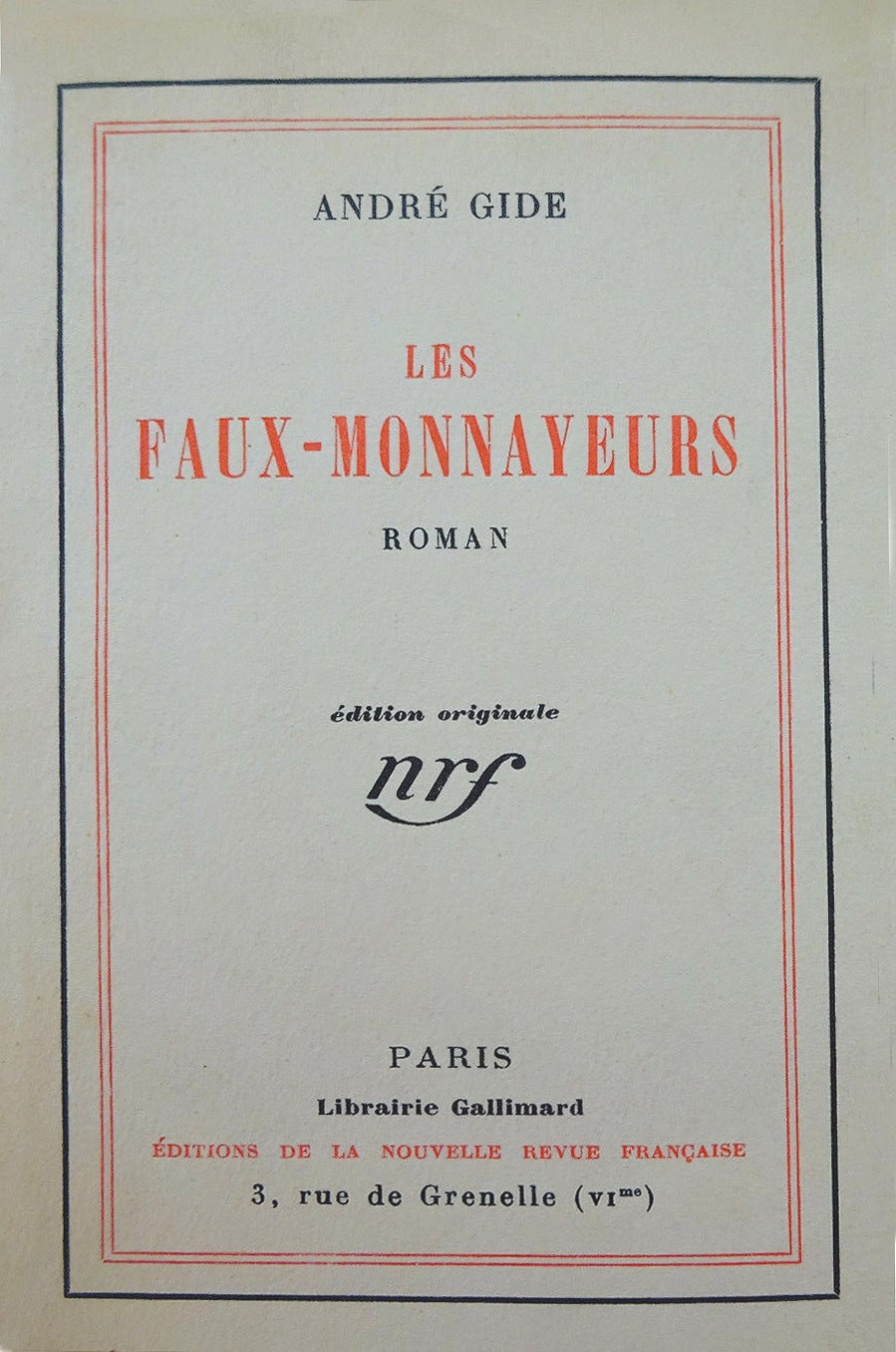
- First edition (NRF, 1925)
- Author: André Gide
- Original title: Les Faux-monnayeurs
- Translator: Dorothy Bussy
- Language: French
- Genre: Modernist
- Publisher: Nouvelle Revue Française (French); Alfred A. Knopf (English translation)
- Publication date: 1925
- Publication place: France
- English publication date: 1927
- Media type: Print (Hardback & Paperback)
- Pages: 480 p. (French); 365 p. (English first edition)
- OCLC: 1631721

The Counterfeiters (French: Les Faux-monnayeurs) is a 1925 novel by French author André Gide, first published in Nouvelle Revue Française. With many characters and crisscrossing plotlines, its main theme is that of the original and the copy, and what differentiates them – both in the external plot of the counterfeit gold coins and in the portrayal of the characters' feelings and their relationships. The Counterfeiters is a novel-within-a-novel, with Édouard (the alter ego of Gide) intending to write a book of the same title. Other stylistic devices are also used, such as an omniscient narrator who sometimes addresses the reader directly, weighs in on the characters' motivations or discusses alternative realities. Therefore, the book has been seen as a precursor of the nouveau roman. The structure of the novel was written to mirror "Cubism", in that it interweaves between several different plots and portrays multiple points of view.

The novel features a considerable number of bisexual or gay male characters – the adolescent Olivier and at least to a certain unacknowledged degree his friend Bernard, in all likelihood their schoolfellows Gontran and Philippe, and finally the adult writers the Comte de Passavant (who represents an evil and corrupting force) and (the more benevolent) Édouard. An important part of the plot is its depiction of various possibilities of positive and negative homoerotic or homosexual relationships.

In the years since its publication, The Counterfeiters has gained a reputation as Gide's masterpiece. It is now generally counted among the Western canon of literature.

The making of the novel, with letters, newspaper clippings and other supporting material, was documented by Gide in his 1927 Journal of The Counterfeiters.

== Plot summary ==
Bernard – a schoolfriend of Olivier's who is preparing for his bac – discovers he is a bastard and takes this as a welcome pretext for running away from home. He spends a night in Olivier's bed (where Olivier describes a recent visit to a prostitute and how he did not find the experience very enjoyable). After Bernard steals the suitcase belonging to Édouard, Olivier's uncle, and the ensuing complications, he is made Édouard's secretary. Olivier is jealous and ends up in the hands of the cynical and downright diabolical Comte de Passavant, who travels with him to the Mediterranean.

Eventually, Bernard and Édouard decide they do not fit as well together as anticipated, and Bernard leaves to take a job at a school, then finally decides to return to his father's home. Olivier is now made Édouard's secretary, and after an eventful evening on which he embarrasses himself grossly, Olivier ends up in bed together with Édouard, finally fulfilling the attraction they have felt for each other all along but were unable to express.

Other plotlines are woven around these elements, such as Olivier's younger brother Georges and his involvement with a ring of counterfeiters, or his older brother Vincent and his relationship with Laura, a married woman, with whom he has a child. Perhaps the most suspenseful scene in the book revolves around Boris, another illegitimate child and the grandson of La Pérouse, who commits suicide in front of the assembled class when dared by Ghéridanisol, another of Passavant's cohorts.

== Composition ==
Gide described The Counterfeiters as his first and only novel, though critics often classify his earlier works as novels as well. Influenced by Cubist painters, Gide sought to portray the novel's events through multiple perspectives, creating what one critic has called a "technique of intentional disintegration of the narrative". Many of the novel's subplots are never resolved, in a deliberate attempt to disconcert the reader and create an "anarchy of novelistic technique". As Germaine Bree describes it, Gide "He introduces a number of seemingly unconnected characters all in motion within an extensive web of relationships going back into the past and on into the future, 'never limited never complete'".

Besides bearing the character traits of Gide himself, some of his characters have been identified with other actual people: in this view, Comte de Passavant is seen as alluding to Jean Cocteau, Olivier to Marc Allégret, and Laura to Gide's cousin and eventual wife Madeleine. According to the historian Elizabeth Roudinesco, the character of Madame Soproniska is based on Eugénie Sokolnicka, with whom Gide had been in analysis in 1921. Boris's suicide is based on a real 1909 incident in Clermont-Ferrand. One actual historical personage, Alfred Jarry, appears under his own name, though in an unflattering portrait that reflects Gide's growing disillusionment with Dadaism.

Some of the situations in the novel closely parallel those of the major novel of Gide's good friend, Roger Martin du Gard, The Thibaults, which was published in installments beginning in 1922. Gide acknowledged the influence of Martin du Gard's novel in a letter to the author dated July 8, 1925. Gide was also influenced by the work of Russian novelist Fyodor Dostoevsky, particularly in The Counterfeiters's exploration of suicide.

== Interpretation ==
Scholar David Haberstich describes the novel's themes as follows: "(1) that we face a dichotomy of the counterfeit versus the genuine, in terms of both tangibles (e.g., currency) and intangibles (e.g., emotion, personality, values, subjective reality); (2) that the attainment of the good and full life is dependent upon vigorous intellectual and moral exercise; and (3) that one must be true to himself and follow his own peculiar star, no matter what the consequences may be." Robert Wexelblatt argues that the novel's polyphonic structure forms a theme in itself: "that one should put oneself at the disposal of life without prejudices, be tolerant of other viewpoints, and relish the relativity of the modern world rather than deriding or complaining about it."

Gide was heavily influenced by his friend Oscar Wilde's aphorism that "Life imitates art far more than art imitates life", and the novel plays extensively with what is real and what is false. Though Boris's suicide is real within the world of the novel (and in fact is based on a real-world event), Édouard the novelist finds it too unbelievable to include his own fictionalized version of events.

Robert K. Martin has described the novel as focused on a crisis of authority common in modernist literature. In this reading, the characters discover monogamy and heteronormativity to be generally agreed-upon fictions, in the same way that money only has value through social agreement. Catharine Savage Brosman reads The Counterfeiters as challenging the "notion of human character as a stable and knowable entity", given the pervasiveness of hypocrisy and dishonesty among the novel's characters.

== Reception ==
In a contemporary review, Louis Kronenberger of The New York Times praised the novel its use of multiple perspectives, building on "the creative and panoramic method of Balzac and Tolstoy". Lecturing a year after the novel's release, British author E.M. Forster described The Counterfeiters as interesting but ultimately a failure for its illogical narrative structure.

In 1999, a Le Monde survey of 17,000 French people named The Counterfeiters the thirtieth most memorable book of the twentieth century. In 2009, The Guardian included it on its list of "1000 novels everyone must read". The novel was also included in the list of 1001 Books You Must Read Before You Die (2006). and Der Spiegel's 100 best books from 1925-2025.

== 2010 film adaptation ==
In 2010, a French TV film based on the novel was directed by Benoît Jacquot, starring Melvil Poupaud as Édouard X., Maxime Berger as Olivier, and Dolores Chaplin as Lady Lilian Griffith.
