= The Politics of Denial =

1996 book

- Author: Michael A. Milburn and Sheree D. Conrad
- Language: English
- Genre: Non-fiction
- Publisher: MIT Press
- Publication date: 1996
- ISBN: 026213330X

The Politics of Denial (ISBN 026213330X) is a book written by psychologists Michael A. Milburn and Sheree D. Conrad and published in 1996 by MIT Press. The authors argue that the political life of a nation often exhibits shared denial of painful realities, and that this phenomenon has its roots in punitive childrearing practices which force children to deny unpleasant truths about their parents. They further argue that such strict parenting also causes authoritarian and punitive adult political positions. The book contains numerous examples from contemporary political life in the U.S., including profiles of educational, religious, and political leaders including Pat Buchanan, Newt Gingrich, Ronald Reagan, and John Silber.

== See also ==
- Psychohistory
