= Jadwiga Abramson =

Child psychologist

- Born: 17 February 1887
- Died: c. 1944
- Occupation: Child psychologist

Jadwiga Abramson (17 February 1887 – 1944) was a Polish child psychologist. She was born and raised in Poland, and educated in France. She was chief of psychology at the Clinic of Paediatric Neuro-Psychiatry in Paris. Her work focused on psychological testing and mental hygiene in school-age children and adolescents, including studies of learning difficulties, behavioural instability and selective educational systems in Europe.

== Biography ==
Abramson attended the University of Paris, to pursue her medical degree. Staying in Paris, she began her career in neuropsychiatry at the Clinic of Paediatric Neuro-Psychiatry, where she was appointed the chief of psychology.

She was the co-founder in 1925, with Dr. Georges Heuyer (1884-1977), of the Clinic of Paediatric Neuro-Psychiatry in Paris. She died around 1944.

== Selected publications ==
=== Journals ===
- Abramson, J. (1920). Recherches sur les fonctions mentales de l'enfant à l'âge scolaire. Des services que peuvent rendre les examens psychologiques pour la connaissance d'une classe [L'Année psychologique] 22 pp. 184–220
- Abramson, J., M. JADWIGA, and H. KOPP. "L'echelle métrique du developpement de la motricité chez l'enfant et chez l'adolescent par N. Oseretsky; traduite et adaptée." L'Hygyène Mentale 31 (1936): 53–75.

=== Books ===
- L'enfant et l'adolescent instables études cliniques et psychologiques by Jadwiga Abramson
- L'enfant et l'adolescent instables by Jadwiga Abramson (1940)
- Notes sur quelques corrélations psycho-motrices chez les écoliers normaux by Jadwiga Abramson, and Suzanne Le Garrec (1937)
- L'Hygiène mentale de l'enfant en Allemagne. Rééducation et orientation professionnelle, by Jadwiga Abramson by Jadwiga Abramson (1931)
- Sur l'organisation de l'enseignement sélectif. Le système de Gary, by Mlle Jadwiga Abramson by Jadwiga Abramson (1928)
- Le profil mental de l'enfant by Jadwiga Abramson
- Quelques pratiques de rééducation des anormaux à l'âge scolaire by Jadwiga Abramson
- Notes sur le mouvement psychotechnique en Allemagne by Jadwiga Abramson
- Le Profil mental dans l'examen des jeunes délinquants, by Dr. Georges Heuyer et Jadwiga Abramson (1931)
- Sur l'organisation de l'enseignement sélectif : le système de Gary by Jadwiga Abramson
- Les Aptitudes intellectuelles spéciales chez les instables : Extrait des annales Médico-Psychologiques by Jadwiga Abramson
- Sur l'organisation de l'enseignement primaire sélectif en Allemagne by Jadwiga Abramson
- L'Oeuvre de rééducation intellectuelle et morale en Belgique, by Jadwiga Abramson et Hélène Kopp (1932)
- Psycholopathologie expérimentale comparée entre les séquelles d'encéphalite épidémique et les perversions constitutionnelles chez les enfants, by Dr. J. Roubinovitch et Jadwiga Abramson (1928)
