= Foreclosure (psychoanalysis) =

Concept by the psychoanalyst Jacques Lacan

In psychoanalysis, foreclosure (also known as "foreclusion"; French: forclusion) is a specific psychical cause for psychosis, according to French psychoanalyst Jacques Lacan.

== History ==
According to Élisabeth Roudinesco, the term was originally introduced into psychology in 1928, when Édouard Pichon published, in Pierre Janet's review, his article on "The Psychological Significance of Negation in French": "...[and] borrowed the legal term forclusif to indicate facts that the speaker no longer sees as part of reality".

According to Christophe Laudou, the term was introduced by Damourette and Pichon.

=== Freud vs Laforgue ===
The publication took part against the background of the Twenties dispute between Freud and René Laforgue over scotomization. "If I am not mistaken", Freud wrote in 1927, "Laforgue would say in this case that the boy 'scotomizes' his perception of the woman's lack of a penis. A new technical term is justified when it describes a new fact or emphasizes it. This is not the case here". Freud went on to suggest that if one wanted to "reserve the word 'Verdrängung' ['repression'] for the affect, then the correct German word for the vicissitude of the idea would be 'Verleugnung' ['disavowal']".

== Lacan's introduction of foreclosure ==
In 1938 Lacan relates the origin of psychosis to an exclusion of the father from the family structure thereby reducing this structure to a mother-child relationship. Later on, when working on the distinctions between the real, imaginary and symbolic father, he specifies that it is the absence of the symbolic father which is linked to psychosis.

Lacan uses the Freudian term, Verwerfung, which the "Standard Edition" translates as "repudiation", as a specific defence mechanism different from repression, "Verdrängung", in which "the ego rejects the incompatible idea together with its affect and behaves as if the idea has never occurred to the ego at all." In 1954 basing himself on a reading of the "Wolf Man" Lacan identifies Verwerfung as the specific mechanism of psychosis where an element is rejected outside the symbolic order as if it has never existed. In 1956 in his Seminar on Psychoses he translates Verwerfung as forclusion, that is foreclosure. "Let us extract from several of Freud's texts a term that is sufficiently articulated in them to designate in them a function of the unconscious that is distinct from the repressed. Let us take as demonstrated the essence of my Seminar on the Psychoses, namely, that this term refers to psychosis: this term is Verwerfung (foreclosure)".

== Lacan and psychosis ==
The problem Lacan sought to address with the twin tools of foreclosure and the signifier was that of the difference between psychosis and neurosis, as manifested in and indicated by language usage. It was common analytic ground that "when psychotics speak they always have some meanings that are too fixed, and some that are far too loose, they have a different relation to language, and a different way of speaking from neurotics." Freud, following Bleuler and Jung, had pointed to 'a number of changes in speech...in schizophrenics...words are subjected to the same process as that which makes the dream'. Lacan used foreclosure to explain why.

When Lacan first uses the Freudian concept of Verwerfung (repudiation) in his search for a specific mechanism for psychosis, it is not clear what is repudiated (castration, speech). In 1957 in his article "On a question preliminary to any possible treatment of psychosis" that he advances the notion that it is the Name-of-the-Father (a fundamental signifier) that is the object of foreclosure. In this way Lacan combines two of his main themes on the causality of psychosis: the absence of the father and the concept of Verwerfung. This ideas remains central to Lacan's thinking on psychosis throughout the rest of his work.

Lacan considered the father to play a vital role in breaking the initial mother/child duality and introducing the child to the wider world of culture, language, institutions and social reality — the Symbolic world — the father being "the human being who stands for the law and order that the mother plants in the life of the child...widens the child's view of the world." The result in normal development is "proper separation from the mother, as marked out by the Names-of-the-father." Thus Lacan postulates the existence of a paternal function (the "Name of the Father" or "primordial signifier") which allows the realm of the Symbolic to be bound to the realms of the Imaginary and the Real. This function prevents the developing child from being engulfed by its mother and allows him/her to emerge as a separate entity in his/her own right. It is a symbol of parental authority (a general symbol that represents the power of father of the Oedipus complex) that brings the child into the realm of the Symbolic by forcing him/her to act and to verbalise as an adult. As a result, the three realms are integrated in a way that is conducive to the creation of meaning and successful communication by means of what Lacan calls a Borromean knot.

When the Name-of-the-Father is foreclosed for a particular subject, it leaves a hole in the Symbolic order which can never be filled. The subject can then be said to have a psychotic structure, even if he shows none of the classical signs of psychosis. When the foreclosed Name-of-the-Father re-appears in the Real, the subject is unable to assimilate it and the result of this collision between the subject and the inassimilable signifier of the Name-of-the-father is the entry into psychosis proper characterized by the onset of hallucinations and/or delusions. In other words, when the paternal function is "foreclosed" from the Symbolic order, the realm of the Symbolic is insufficiently bound to the realm of the Imaginary and failures in meaning may occur (the Borromean knot becomes undone and the three realms completely disconnected), with "a disorder caused at the most personal juncture between the subject and his sense of being alive." Psychosis is experienced after some environmental sign in the form of a signifier which the individual cannot assimilate is triggered, and this entails that "the Name-of-the-Father, is foreclosed, verworfen, is called into symbolic opposition to the subject." The fabric of the individual's reality is ripped apart and no meaningful Symbolic sense can be made of experience. "Absence of transcendence of the Oedipus places the subject under the regime of foreclosure or non-distinction between the symbolic and the real'; and psychotic delusions or hallucinations are the consequent result of the individual's striving to account for what he/she experiences.
