= Françoise Minkowska =

French psychiatrist (1882–1950)

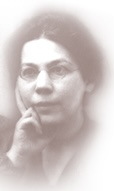

Françoise Minkowska-Brokman (22 January 1882 – 15 September 1950) was a French Jewish psychiatrist and psychoanalyst, born in Poland..

She was married to the psychiatrist Eugene Minkowski. Their son was the pediatrician Alexandre Minkowski. Their daughter Jeannine Pilliard-Minkowski wrote a memoir of her parents' life and work.

With her husband, she fled to Zurich at the outbreak of World War I, where they trained as psychiatrists at the Burghölzli Institute directed by Eugen Bleuler.

She was associated with the work of Hermann Rorschach, another of Bleuler's pupils.

She studied the life of Vincent Van Gogh, and argued that the artist's illness was not schizophrenia, but epilepsy.

She established the Centre Françoise Minkowska, a psychiatric institute for refugees and migrants.
