= Alexandre Minkowski =

French paediatrician (1915–2004)

Alexandre Minkowski (5 December 1915 – 7 May 2004) was a French paediatrician, and arguably the French physician who most influenced neonatology in the 20th century. He was born and died in Paris.

He was the son of the eminent medical philosopher Eugene Minkowski and the psychiatrist Françoise Minkowska. They were Polish Jewish doctors who settled in France and became naturalised citizens after World War I. They kept up their links with their ancestral Poland.

His son is the orchestral conductor Marc Minkowski.
