= Banyuls-dels-Aspres =

Banyuls-dels-Aspres Banyuls dels Aspres (Catalan)
- Commune
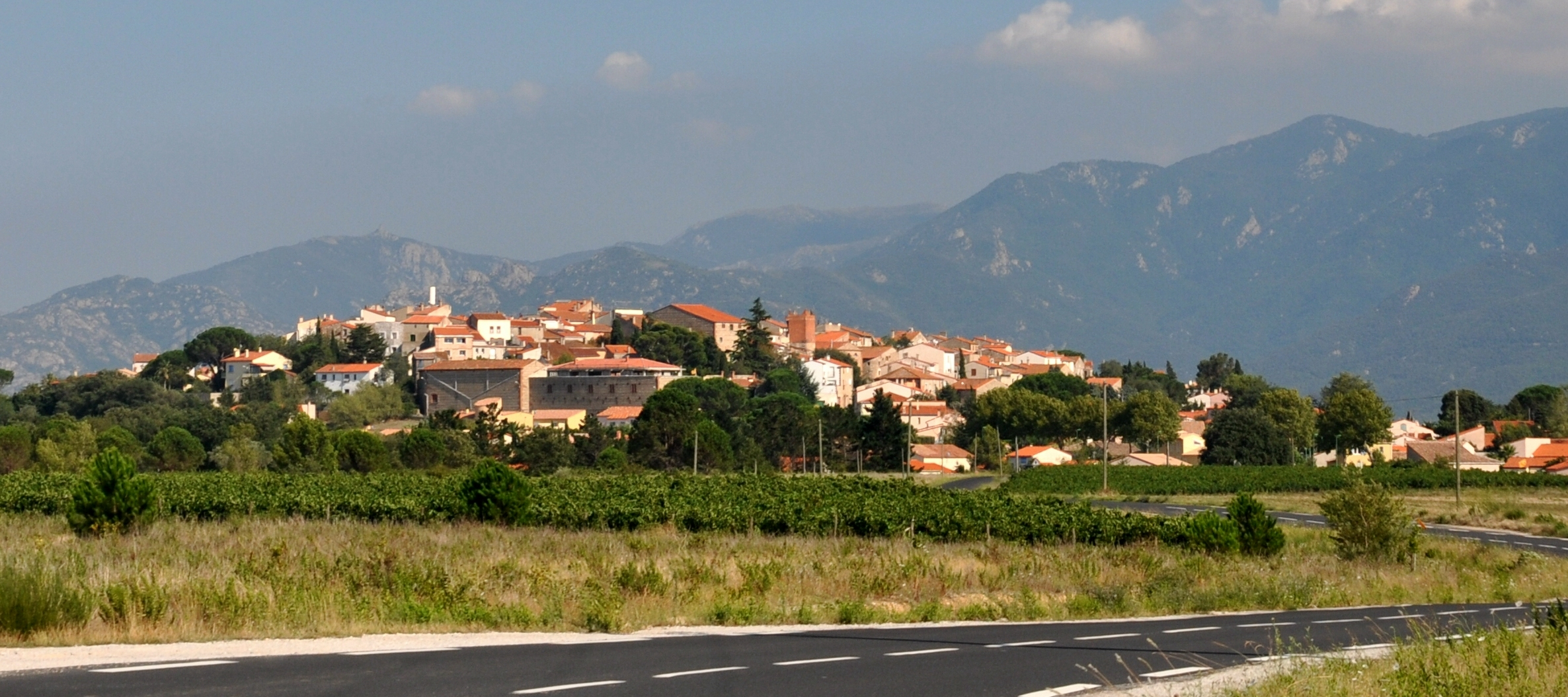
- Banyuls-dels-Aspres

- Coat of arms
- Location of Banyuls-dels-Aspres
- Location within France Location within Occitanie
- Coordinates: 42°34′00″N 2°52′05″E
- Country: France
- Region: Occitania
- Department: Pyrénées-Orientales
- Arrondissement: Céret
- Canton: Les Aspres
- Intercommunality: Aspres

Government
  - Mayor (2020–2026): Laurent Bernardy
- Area^{1}: 10.53 km^{2} (4.07 sq mi)
- Elevation: 114 m (374 ft)
- Highest elevation: 124 m (407 ft)
- Lowest elevation: 41 m (135 ft)
- Population (2023): 1,483
  - Density: 140.8/km^{2} (364.8/sq mi)
- Demonym: banyulenc (ca)
- Time zone: UTC+01:00 (CET)
  - Summer (DST): UTC+02:00 (CEST)
- INSEE/Postal code: 66015 /66300
- ^{1} French Land Register data, which excludes lakes, ponds, glaciers > 1 km^{2} (0.386 sq mi or 247 acres) and river estuaries.

Banyuls-dels-Aspres (French pronunciation: [baɲuls dɛl.z‿aspʁ]; Catalan: Banyuls dels Aspres [bəˈɲuɫs dəɫs aspɾəs]) is a commune in the Pyrénées-Orientales department in southern France.

== Geography ==
=== Localisation ===
Banyuls-dels-Aspres is located in the canton of Les Aspres and in the arrondissement of Céret.

It is part of the Northern Catalan comarca of Rosselló, as well as the subcomarca of Aspres.

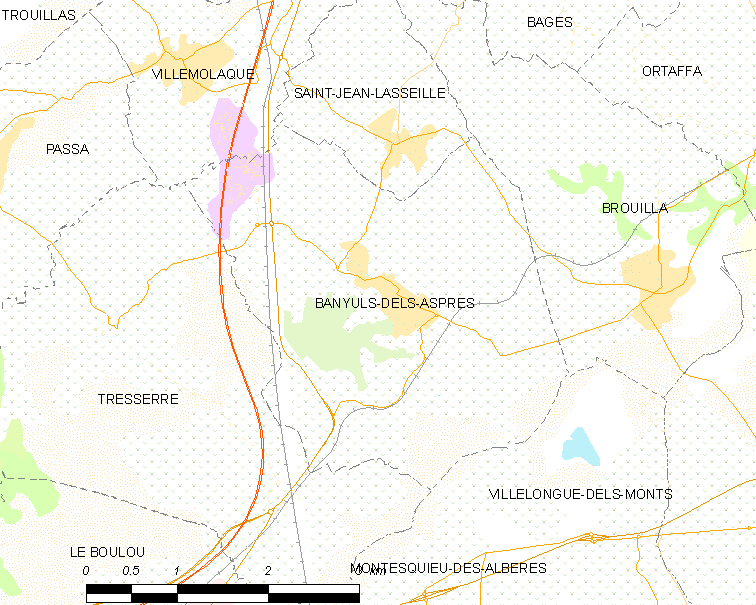
Map of Banyuls-dels-Aspres and its surrounding communes

== Government and politics ==
=== Mayors ===
Mayor	Term start	Term end
André Marie	2001	2014
Laurent Bernardy	2014	

== Population ==
Historical population
Year	Pop.	±% p.a.
1968	724	—
1975	683	−0.83%
1982	660	−0.49%
1990	850	+3.21%
1999	1,007	+1.90%
2007	1,154	+1.72%
2012	1,237	+1.40%
2017	1,259	+0.35%
2023	1,483	+2.77%
Source: INSEE

The inhabitants are called Banyulencs in French.

== Sites of interest ==
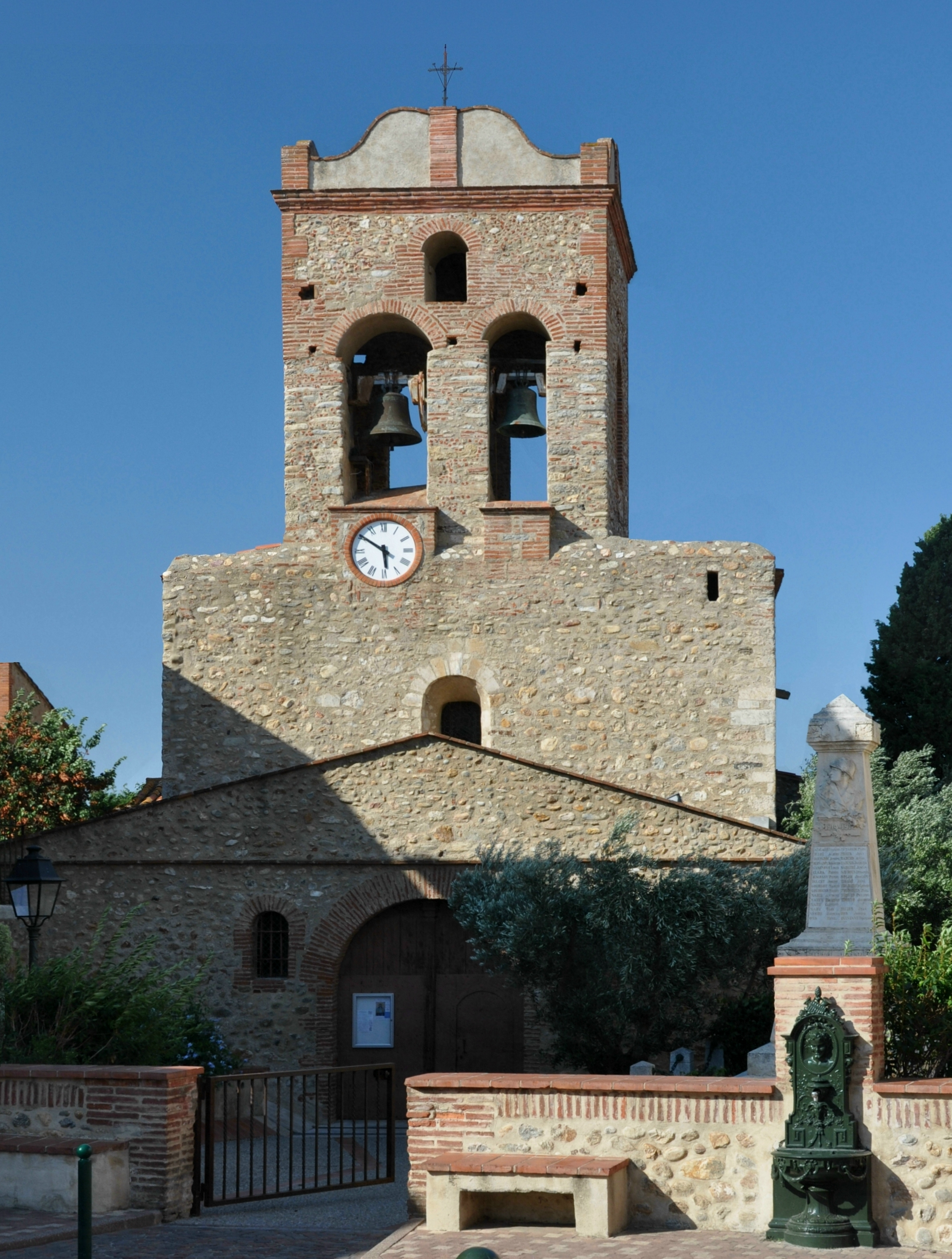
Saint-Andrew church

- Saint-Andrew church, first mentioned in 1091 but rebuilt in the 15th century.

== Notable people ==
- Henri Ey (1900-1977) : psychiatrist and philosopher born in Banyuls-dels-Aspres.

== See also ==
- Communes of the Pyrénées-Orientales department
