= Édouard Pichon =

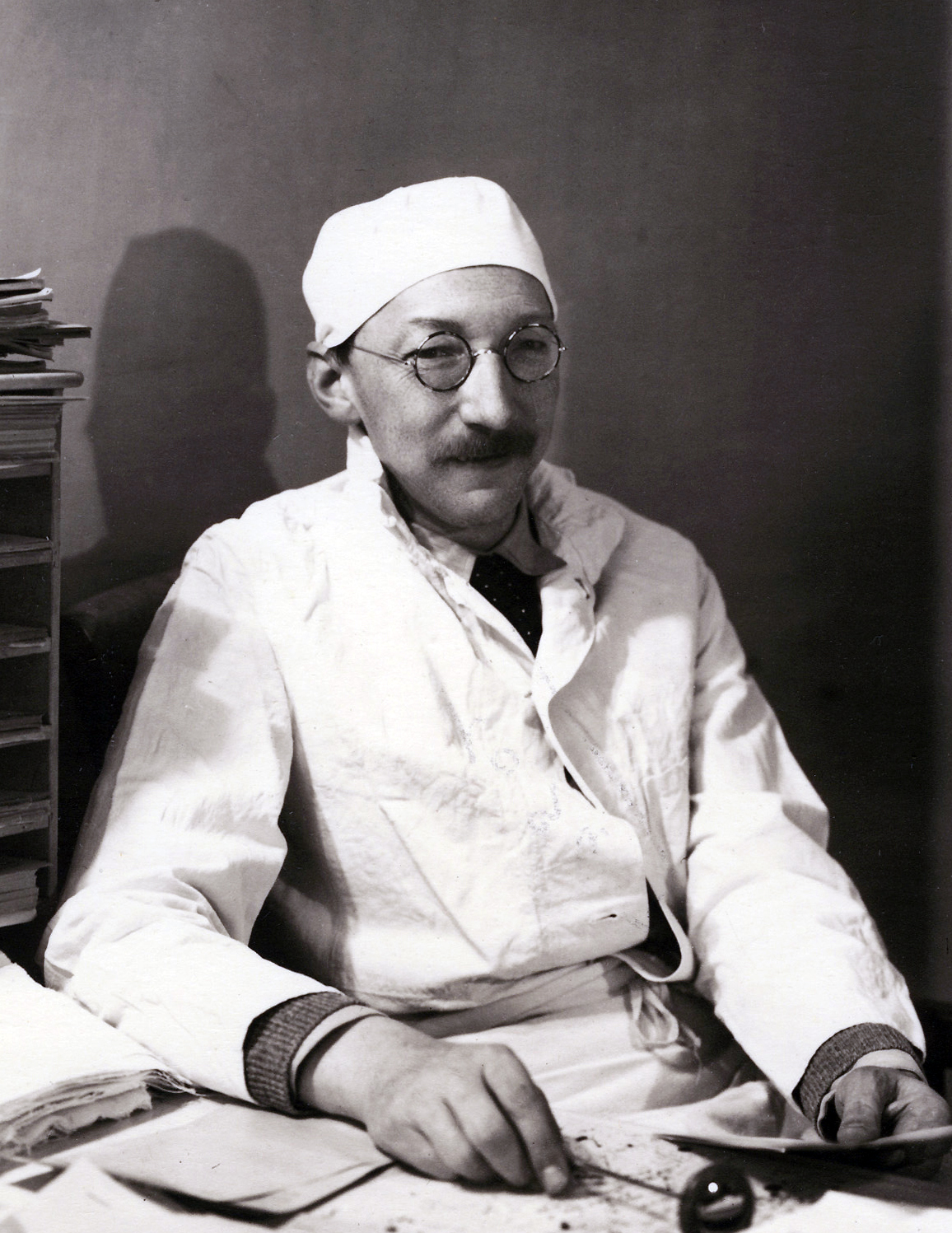
- Born: 24 June 1890; Sarcelles, France
- Died: 20 January 1940 (aged 49); Paris, France
- Scientific career
- Fields: Pediatrics, linguistics, psychoanalysis

Édouard Pichon (French: [piʃɔ̃]; 24 June 1890 – 20 January 1940) was a French pediatrician, grammarian and psychoanalyst.

== Career ==
A distinguished and innovative grammarian, Pichon was analysed by Eugénie Sokolnicka, and became a founding member of the Paris Psychoanalytic Society in 1926. A member of the royalist and reactionary Action Française, Pichon represented the jingoistic strand of French psychoanalysis, with his belief in "the genuine culture and the true civilization of our country...this fundamental Frenchness".

Through his mixture of linguistic and psychoanalytic thinking, Pichon was a powerful influence on Jacques Lacan (as well as a practical mentor). In Écrits, Lacan paid tribute to "a divination that I can attribute only to his practise of semantics...that guided him in people's dark places".

Among the psychoanalytic concepts introduced by what Élisabeth Roudinesco called Pichon's "fatalist genius", were those of oblatory, scotomization, and foreclosure.

== See also ==
- Francoise Dolto
- Georges Bataille
- Pierre Janet
- René Laforgue
