= Eugénie Sokolnicka =

French psychoanalyst (1884–1934)

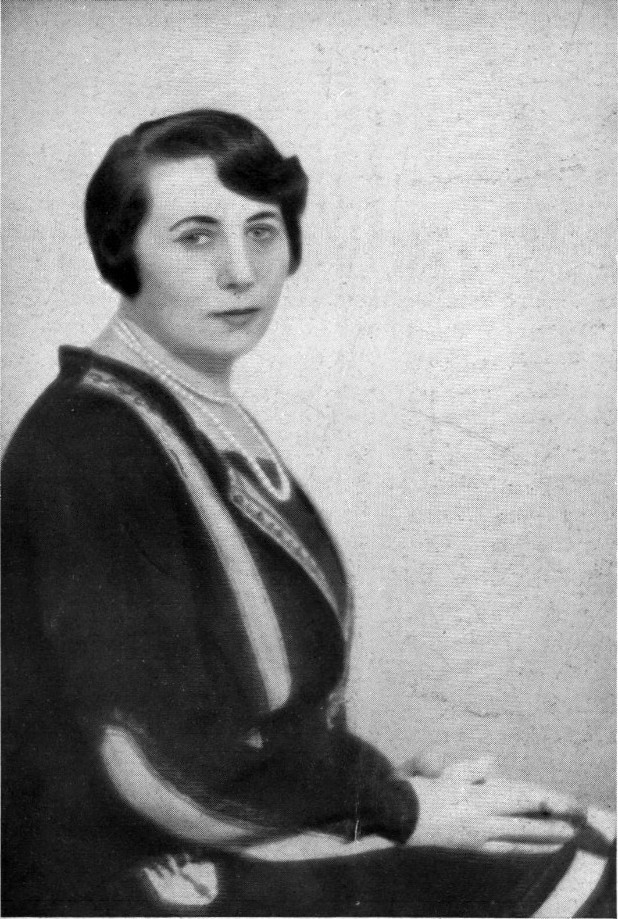
- Born: Eugenia Kutner; 14 June 1876; Warsaw, Congress Poland
- Died: 19 May 1934 (aged 57); Paris, France
- Resting place: Cimetière parisien de Bagneux
- Spouse: Michał Sokolnicki (m. 1903; div. 1916)
- Scientific career
- Fields: Psychology, psychoanalysis

Eugénie Sokolnicka (Polish: Eugenia Sokolnicka, née Kutner; 14 June 1876 – 19 May 1934) was a Polish-French psychoanalyst. She is credited as having helped introduce psychoanalysis in both France and Poland, and was a co-founder of the Paris Psychoanalytic Society.

== Biography ==
=== Early years ===
Sokolnicka was born into a bourgeois and intellectual Jewish family in Warsaw. Her father, Maurycy Kutner, was a bank clerk, and her mother, Paulina Flejszer, was a member of secret women's organizations during the January Uprising of 1863. Her paternal grandfather had fought as an officer in the November Uprising of 1830, and one of her paternal uncles had been deported to Siberia for his role in the 1863 uprising.^{:591}

Having been raised by a French governess, Sokolnicka moved to Paris in 1899 to study biology at the Sorbonne, graduating with a degree in natural sciences in 1902. During her studies she attended lectures by Pierre Janet, which sparked her interest in psychology, and established friendships in literary circles.

=== Psychoanalytic formation ===
After her return to Warsaw she married Michał Sokolnicki, a landowner whom she had met during her time in Paris, and dedicated herself to family life for several years. In 1911 she decided to pursue her interest in psychology and moved to Zurich, where she studied under Carl Jung at the Burghölzli psychiatric hospital. At the time of the break between Jung and Sigmund Freud in 1913, Sokolnicka moved to Vienna and began a training analysis with Freud,^{:592} and attended some sessions of the Vienna Psychoanalytic Society. Her analysis with Freud lasted about a year, and is described as having provoked "a rather hostile counter-transference" in the latter. At around the same time, Sokolnicka divorced her husband.

In the spring of 1914 Sokolnicka settled in Munich on Freud's advice. The outbreak of World War I soon caused her return to Warsaw, where she continued her practice. In 1916 the war once again forced her to flee, this time to Zurich,^{:592} before she once again returned to Poland toward the end of 1917. In April 1919 she treated a Jewish boy from Minsk who was suffering from obsessional neurosis. The treatment lasted six weeks, and incorporated elements from both psychoanalysis and pedagogy;^{:593} while not a traditional psychoanalysis, the case has been described as one of the earliest examples of a child analysis conducted under conditions similar to those of adults.

In January 1920 she moved to Budapest to begin a second analysis, this time with Sándor Ferenczi; while apparently not an easy patient and suffering from various personal problems, Ferenczi took note of the qualities of her interpretations and her analytical talent. In September 1920 she took part in the sixth congress of the International Psychoanalytical Association, where she presented a paper on the diagnosis and the symptomatology of neurosis.^{:592}

=== Move to Paris ===
After having attempted to found a psychoanalytic society in Warsaw, something which ultimately did not materialize,^{:597} Sokolnicka expressed a will to relocate to Paris. Ferenczi asked Freud to recommend her to his French editor and translator Samuel Jankélévitch; although Freud was initially reluctant, she eventually received his approval and moved to Paris in the autumn of 1921. Her contacts there were initially centered on literary circles around the Nouvelle Revue française, and she introduced psychoanalytic ideas to writers such as André Gide and Jacques Rivière in 1921–1922.^{:598} Gide is believed to have had a number of analytic sessions with Sokolnicka, and she served as the basis for the doctoress Sophroniska in his 1925 novel Les Faux-monnayeurs.

While a lecturer at the École des hautes études sociales in the winter of 1922–1923, Sokolnicka was introduced to Georges Heuyer of the Sainte-Anne Hospital Center through the novelist Paul Bourget. Heuyer invited her to Sainte-Anne, where she opened a consultation office and held training analyses with several young French psychiatrists, such as René Laforgue and Édouard Pichon. As a non-physician she was however never very well accepted in medical circles: she was removed from Sainte-Anne by Henri Claude, and replaced by Laforgue, in 1924. She also failed to become the leader of the psychoanalytic movement in France, which, in spite of Freud's active endorsement of Sokolnicka, would be spearheaded by Laforgue and Marie Bonaparte.

=== Later years and death ===
Despite serving as vice-president of the Paris Psychoanalytic Society from its foundation in 1926 until 1928, Sokolnicka's clientele of analysands successively diminished over the years. She had to practice shorter treatments, barely earning her enough to live, and from 1931 she also struggled with depressive states. She ended her life by deliberate gas poisoning at her Paris apartment in 1934.

== Bibliography ==
- "Analyse einer infantilen Zwangsneurose", Internationale Zeitschrift für Psychoanalyse, vol. 6, 1920, pp. 228–241
  - "Analysis of an obsessional neurosis in a child", International Journal of Psychoanalysis, vol. 3, 1920, pp. 306–319
  - "L'Analyse d'un cas de névrose obsessionnelle infantile", Revue de neuro-psychiatrie infantile et d'hygiène mentale de l'enfance, vol. 16, n° 5/6, May–June 1968, pp. 473–488
- "On the diagnosis and symptomatology of the psycho-analytical theory of the neuroses", Bulletin of the International Psychoanalytic Association, vol. 1, 1920, pp. 342–362
- "Quelques problèmes de technique psychanalytique", Revue française de psychanalyse, vol. 3, 1929, pp. 1–49
- "Le Dynamisme des névroses et la psychanalyse", La Prophylaxie mentale : bulletin trimestriel de la Ligue d'hygiène mentale, June 1929, pp. 417–425
- "Sur un cas de guérison rapide", Revue française de psychanalyse, vol. 5, 1932, pp. 440
- "À propos de l'article de M. René Laforgue", Revue française de psychanalyse, vol. 6, 1933, pp. 361–363
