= Carlos (singer) =

French singer (1943–2008)

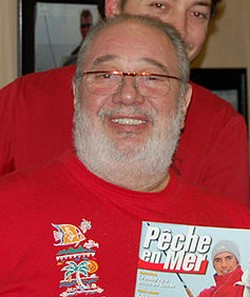
- Carlos at the 2007 Paris International Sport Fishing Show. Carlos was a sport fishing addict.

Background information
- Born: Jean-Chrysostome Dolto; February 20, 1943; Paris, France
- Died: January 17, 2008 (aged 64) Clichy, Hauts-de-Seine, France
- Label: Lave-toi les oreilles
- Website: musicarlos.com

Carlos (born Jean-Chrysostome Dolto; February 20, 1943 – January 17, 2008) was a French singer, entertainer and actor. He is sometimes called Jean-Christophe Doltovitch.

Jean-Chrysostome Dolto is the son of the psychoanalyst and pediatrician Françoise Dolto (née Marette) (1908–1988) and the physiotherapist Boris Dolto (1899–1981), of Russian origin.

Carlos was heavily overweight and cultivated a jovial countenance, and adopted a look similar to the singer Antoine, with leis and Hawaiian shirts. In 1980, he became a spokesman for the Oasis brand fruit drink, with his song "Rosalie" (a cover of Georges Plonquitte, singer for Typical Combo, a Guadeloupean group) being used in their television advertisements.
