= Adalberto Pazzini =

Italian physician and medical historian (1898–1975)

Adalberto Pazzini (23 February 1898 – 10 May 1975) was an Italian physician and medical historian.

== Biography ==
He graduated in medicine at the University of Rome "La Sapienza" in 1922 with a thesis in experimental physiology under the guidance of Silvestro Baglioni. He soon combined his medical practice in some Roman hospitals with a deep interest in the history of medicine.

Since 1931 he held an elective course in history of medicine at La Sapienza. In 1932 he obtained the teaching habilitation and became the professor in charge of the discipline starting from the academic year 1936-37. Always a strong supporter of the need to teach history in medical schools, in 1955 he became full professor at the same university, also thanks to the support of a luminary like Cesare Frugoni.

He published more the 500 books and papers. In 1938, he founded a Medical history museum at La Sapienza and, in 1954, he obtained the funding for a dedicated building to permanently host it, together with a specialized library.

He was president of the Società Italiana di Storia della Medicina from 1956 to 1965 and president of the International Society for the History of Medicine from 1964 to 1968.

== Main literary works ==
- I santi nella storia della medicina [The saints in the history of medicine], Mediterranea, Roma 1937, pp. 605
- Il pensiero medico nei secoli. Dalle scuole italiche al secolo diciannovesimo, Sansoni, Firenze 1939, pp. 334
- Storia della medicina, Società editrice libraria, Milano 1947, 2 volumes
- Bio-Bibliografia di Storia della Chirurgia, Cosmopolita, Roma 1948, pp. 525
- Demoni, streghe e guaritori [Demons, witches and healers], Bompiani, Milano 1951, pp. 290
- Il romanzo della medicina moderna, Casini, Roma 1955, pp. 296
- Assistenza e ospedali nella storia dei Fatebenefratelli, Marietti, Torino 1956, pp. 577
- L'ospedale nei secoli, Orizzonte Medico, Roma 1958, pp. 322
- La storia della Facoltà medica di Roma The story of the Medical School of Rome, Istituto di storia della medicina della Università di Roma, Roma 1961, 2 voll.
- Origine e sviluppo della medicina sociale in Italia, Istituto italiano di medicina sociale, Roma 1966, pp. 300
- La medicina nella storia, nell'arte, nel costume, Bramante, Milano 1968-1970, 3 volumes
- Storia dell'arte sanitaria dalle origini a oggi, Minerva Medica, Torino, 1973, 2 volumes

== Bibliography ==
- Alessandro Aruta, Silvia Marinozzi, "Il museo di storia della medicina della 'Sapienza' Università di Roma", Medicina nei Secoli, 2009, 21/1, pp. 11–35
- Maria Conforti, “Adalberto Pazzini e le origini dell’Istituto di Storia della Medicina”, Medicina nei Secoli, 2006, 18/1, pp. 297–312
- J.F.F. (John Farquhar Fulton), "Professor Adalberto Pazzini Elected to Chair of the History of Medicine in Rome", Journal of the History of Medicine and Allied Sciences, January 1956, p. 106
- Luigi Stroppiana, “Adalberto Pazzini (23-2-1898 – 10–5–1975)”, Medicina nei Secoli, 1975 Jan-Apr;12(1), pp. v-x
