= Name of the Father =

Psychoanalytic concept by Jacques Lacan

The name of the father (French nom du père) is a concept that Jacques Lacan developed from his seminar The Psychoses (1955–1956) to cover the role of the father in the Symbolic Order.

Lacan plays with the similar sounds in French of le nom du père (the name of the father), le non du père (the no of the father), and les non-dupes errent (the non-dupes err) to emphasize with the first two phrases the legislative and prohibitive functions of the father and to emphasize with the last phrase that "those who do not let themselves be caught in the symbolic deception/fiction and continue to believe their eyes are the ones who err most".

== Origins and scope ==
Lacan's concept draws on the mythical father of Freud's Totem and Taboo; and was used by him as a strategic move in his opposition to what he saw as the over-emphasis of object relations theory on the exclusive relationship of the individual and his/her mother as a dual pair.

Lacan emphasised instead the importance of the third party in the Oedipus complex – what he called "the place that she [the mother] reserves for the Name-of-the Father in the promulgation of the law". He saw this as a vital element in helping each new member of the human race to move from an exclusive, primary relation to the mother[er] to a wider engagement with the outside, cultural world – the symbolic order.

=== Wider horizons ===
Anthony Stevens has similarly argued that "Traditionally, the father's orientation is centrifugal, i. e., towards the outside world...his is the primary responsibility for facilitating the transition from home to society'. Likewise the family therapist Robin Skynner sees the father (or fatherer) playing an essential role in the process whereby "the toddler has got to see that Mum isn't God as a first step to seeing that Dad isn't God, and that...he's part of something bigger too".

For Lacan, that bigger context could be seen as "the chain of discourse...in which an entire family, an entire coterie, an entire camp, an entire nation or half the world will be caught". The internalisation of the Name of the Father with the passing of the Oedipus complex ensured for Lacan participation in that wider chain of discourse, and was for him an essential element of human sanity.

== Three paternal functions ==
Lacan distinguishes between the Symbolic, the Imaginary and the Real father: "It is in the name of the father that we must recognise the support of the symbolic function which, from the dawn of history, has identified his person with the figure of the law" – as distinct from "the narcissistic relations, or even from the real relations, which the subject sustains with the image and action of the person who embodies it". This paternal function imposes the law and regulates desire in the Oedipus complex, intervening in the imaginary dual relationship between mother and child to introduce a necessary symbolic distance between them. 'The true function of the Father is fundamentally to unite (and not to set in opposition) a desire and the Law', and the Symbolic Father is thus not an actual subject but a position in the Symbolic Order.

By contrast the Imaginary Father is an imago, the composite of all the imaginary constructs that the subject builds up in fantasy around the figure of the father; and may be construed either as an ideal father or as the opposite, the bad father – what Slavoj Žižek referred to as "the reverse of the father, the "anal father" who lurks behind the Name-of-the-Father qua bearer of the symbolic law".

As to the real father, Lacan stresses how "the ravaging effects of the paternal figure are to be observed with particular frequency in cases where the father really has the function of a legislator...with too many opportunities of being in a position of undeserving, inadequacy, even of fraud, and, in short, of excluding the Name-of-the-Father from its position in the signifier".

== Psychosis ==
Psychosis for Lacanians is the exact opposite of the Name of the Father – the absence of that identification with the symbolic order which ensures our place in the shared intersubjective world of common sense. The Name-of-the-Father is thus the fundamental signifier which permits signification to proceed normally. It not only confers identity and position on the subject within the symbolic order, but also signifies the Oedipal prohibition (the "no" of the incest taboo).

If this signifier is foreclosed, in the sense of being excluded from the Symbolic Order, the result is psychosis. Psychotics have not been properly separated from their mother[er] by the fixed name-of-the-father, and hence relate to speech and language differently from neurotics.

In On a Question Preliminary to Any Possible Treatment of Psychosis (1957), Lacan represents the Oedipus complex as "the metaphor of the Name-of-the-Father, that is, the metaphor that substitutes this Name in the place first symbolized by the operation of the absence of the mother". All paternity thus involves metaphoric substitution.

Lacan originally presents the 'paternal metaphor' in his Seminar La relation d'objet (1956–1957): it is the fundamental metaphor on which all signification depends (all signification is phallic). If the Name-of-the-Father is foreclosed, as in psychosis, there can be no paternal metaphor and hence no phallic signification.

== Late Lacan ==
In his late seminars, Lacan downplayed the hitherto central importance of the Name-of-the-Father and the Oedipus complex as well, considering them either irrelevant or misleading in terms of his then-current concerns.

== See also ==
- Eternal sin
- Floating signifier
- Keystone (architecture)
- Master–slave dialectic
- Nomos (mythology)
- Nomos (sociology)
- Phallocentrism
- Phallus
- Prohibition
