= International Society for the History of Medicine =

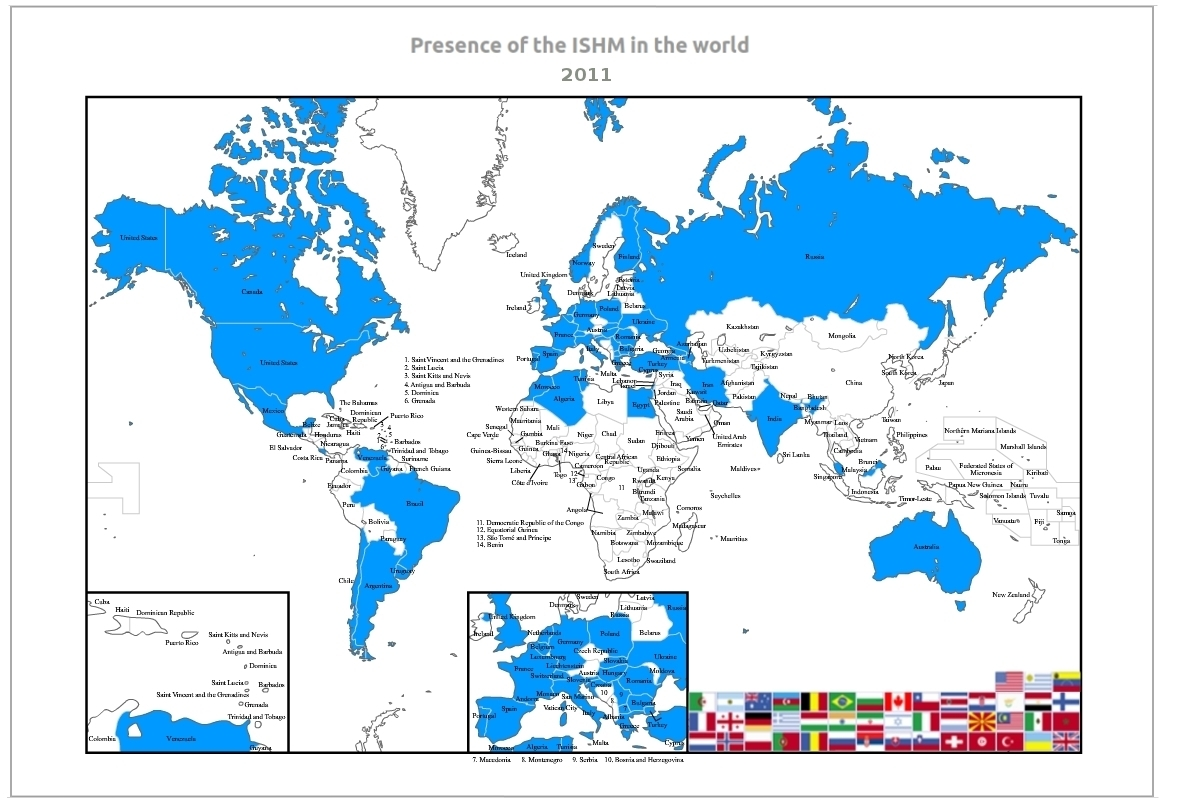
International Society for the History of Medicine presence

The International Society for the History of Medicine is a non profit international society devoted to the academic study of the history of medicine, including the organization of international congresses. The Society was founded in 1920 in Belgium.

The society is present in 50 countries, holds delegations in 38 countries, and has about 800 members. It is affiliated with national societies in many countries, among which are Argentina, Australia, Belgium, Brazil, Canada, Chile, China, Finland, France, Georgia, Germany, Greece, Italy, Latvia, Mexico, Morocco, Portugal, Romania, Spain, Tunisia, Turkey, the United States, and the United Kingdom. Membership is open to both physicians and historians.

== International congresses ==
The society holds a biennial International Congress, and, beginning in 2001, an international meeting in the years the main conference is not held. Communications to the international congresses are peer reviewed.

== Vesalius ==
The ISHM publishes twice a year Vesalius, subtitled Acta Internationalia Historiae Medicinae, an academic journal publishing some abstracts from its International Congresses and International Meetings for the History of Medicine, and some other scientific communications.

Editor-in-Chief: Francesco M. Galassi (Poland) & International Editorial Board and Referees (2024): Dana Baran (Romania), Luca Borghi (Italy), Maria do Sameiro Barroso (Portugal), Kenneth Collins (Israel & UK), Valentina Gazzaniga (Italy), Donatella Lippi (Italy), Ricardo Jorge Losardo (Argentina), Paolo Mazzarello (Italy), Andrew Nadell (USA), Juris Salaks (Latvia), Ragnar Stien (Norway), Alain Touwaide (USA), Robrecht Van Hee (Belgium), Elena Varotto (Australia), Carlos Viesca (Mexico), Fabio Zampieri (Italy), Giorgio Zanchin (Italy).

== Presidents ==
- 1921-1930: Jean-Joseph Tricot-Royer
- 1930-1936: Davide Giordano
- 1936-1946: Victor Gomoiu
- 1946-1953: Maxime Laignel-Lavastine
- 1953-1964: Ernest Wickersheimer
- 1964-1968: Adalberto Pazzini
- 1968-1971: Maurice Bariety
- 1971-1976: Noël Poynter
- 1976-1980: De la Broquerie Fortie
- 1980-1984: Jean-Charles Sournia
- 1984-1992: Hans Schadewaldt
- 1992-1996: John Cule
- 1996-2000: Ynez Viole O'Neill
- 2000-2004: Jean-Pierre Tricot
- 2004-2008: Athanasios Diamandopoulos
- 2008–2016: Giorgio Zanchin
- 2016-2024: Carlos Viesca Treviño
- 2024-present: Dana Baran

== Board ==
• President: Prof. Dana Baran. • Vice Presidents: Prof. Maria do Sameiro Barroso; Prof. Maria Blanca Ramos de Viesca; Prof. Ricardo Losardo; Dr. Andrew Nadell. • Secretary General: Prof. Juris Salaks. • Associate Secretary General: Prof. Hamza Essadam. • Treasurer: Prof. Luca Borghi. • Editor of Vesalius: Prof. Francesco Maria Galassi. • Advisors: Prof. Giorgio Zanchin; Prof. Jean-Pierre Tricot; Prof. Ana Maria Rosso; Prof. Amélia Ricon Ferraz; Prof. Axel Karenberg; Prof. Zhang Daqing.
