= Henri Ey =

Henri Marie Jean Louis Ey (French: [ɛ]; 10 August 1900, Banyuls-dels-Aspres – 8 November 1977, Banyuls-dels-Aspres) was a French neurologist, psychiatrist, psychoanalyst and philosopher.

== Biography ==
Ey was born on 10 August 1900 in Banyuls-dels-Aspres, Pyrénées-Orientales, and died there on 9 November 1977.

After the Second World War, Ey renewed the group L'Évolution Psychiatrique with Eugène Minkowski.

== Psychiatric theory ==
Ey developed an "organodynamic psychology" and a theory of the structure of states of consciousness, in which he developed ideas of Pierre Janet and John Hughlings Jackson.

It was under the title of Organodynamic Psychology that Ey developed a unifying psychology which included both organic (neurological, genetic, etc.) and psychodynamic factors.

== Honors and Awards ==
- Officer of the Order of Legion of Honour
- Officer of the Ordre de la Santé publique

== Works ==
- Hallucinations et Délire, Alcan 1934. réédité: Ed.: L'Harmattan; 2000, ISBN 2-7384-7843-3
- Des idées de Jackson à un modèle organo-dynamique en psychiatrie, Doin 1938, Privat 1975, L’Harmattan 2000, ISBN 2-7384-5926-9
- Le Problème de la psychogenèse des névroses et des psychoses (avec L. Bonnafé, S. Follin, J. Lacan, J. Rouart), Desclée de Brouwer, 1950. Réédition 1977 et 2004 (Tchou)
- Études psychiatriques : Desclée de Brouwer t.I, 1948, 296p; t.II. 1950, 550p; t.III 1954. réédité en 2 volume et un CDRom, Préface Patrice Belzeaux et Jean Garrabé, Ed.: CREHEY Cercle de Recherche et d'Edition Henri Ey; 2007, ISBN 2-9527859-0-2
- Traité de psychiatrie de l’Encyclopédie Médico-chirurgicale (avec 142 collaborateurs), 3 t. 1955.
- Manuel de psychiatrie (avec Bernard et Brisset), Masson 1960, 5 fois réédité.
- L’Inconscient 1 vol. Desclée de Brouwer 1966, 2004 (Tchou), réédition: L'Inconscient : VIe colloque de Bonneval, Ed.: Bibliothèque des Introuvables, 2006, ISBN 2-84575-187-7
- La Conscience, l vol. PUF 439p (1963) et Desclée de Brouwer 1968.
- Conscience, article in Encyclopædia universalis, vol.IV, mai 1969,922–927.
- La dissolution de la conscience dans le sommeil et le rêve et ses rapports avec la psychopathologie. Esquisse d'une théorie de la relativité généralisée de la désorganisation de l'être conscient et des diverses maladies mentales, in l'Évolution psychiatrique, rééd.: 2007, n0 72, ISBN 2-84299-898-7
- Traité des hallucinations, Masson 1973, 2 tomes., 2004 (Tchou), Réédition T.1, Ed.: Bibliothèque des Introuvables, 2006, ISBN 2-84575-185-0, Tome 2, Ed.: Bibliothèque des Introuvables, 2006, ISBN 2-84575-186-9
- La Notion de schizophrénie (séminaire de Thuir), Desclée de Brouwer 1975.
- Schizophrénie: études cliniques et psychopathologiques, Ed.: Empecheurs Penser en Rond, 1996, ISBN 2-908602-82-2
- Psychophysiologie du sommeil et psychiatrie. Masson 1974.
- Défense et illustration de la psychiatrie, Masson 1977.
- Naissance de la médecine. 1 vol. Masson, 1981.
- Le déchiffrement de l'inconscient; Travaux psychanalytiques, (texte de 1964), Ed.: L'Harmattan, 2005, ISBN 2-7475-8008-3
- Neurologie et psychiatrie, (texte de 1947), Ed.: Hermann, 1998, ISBN 2-7056-6372-X
- Consciousness: A Phenomenological Study of Being Conscious and Becoming Conscious, Trans John H. Flodstrom, Bloomington/London: Indiana University Press, 1978.
