= Alain de Mijolla =

French psychoanalyst and psychiatrist (1933–2019)

Alain de Mijolla (15 May 1933 – 24 January 2019) was a French psychoanalyst and psychiatrist, born in Paris. Mijolla was analyzed by Conrad Stein and Denise Braunschweig. He became a psychoanalyst in the Societe psychanalytique de Paris in 1968, and was by 2001 a training analyst there.

He also created and chaired the International Association of History of the Psychoanalysis (AIHP), and received the Mary S. Sigourney Award in 2004.

He died in 2019 in Paris, aged 85.

== Writings ==
De Mijolla wrote numerous articles and works. In a 1987 paper on identification in the family, he highlighted how Sigmund Freud's creativity can be linked with his identification with the prestige of his grandfather.

His 1999 article "Freud and the Psychoanalytic Situation on the Screen" stressed the difficulties of representing the psychoanalytic setting in cinematic terms.

He also edited psychoanalytical collections at several publishers, including the three volumes of the International Dictionary of Psychoanalysis (2005).
