= René Laforgue =

French psychiatrist and psychoanalyst

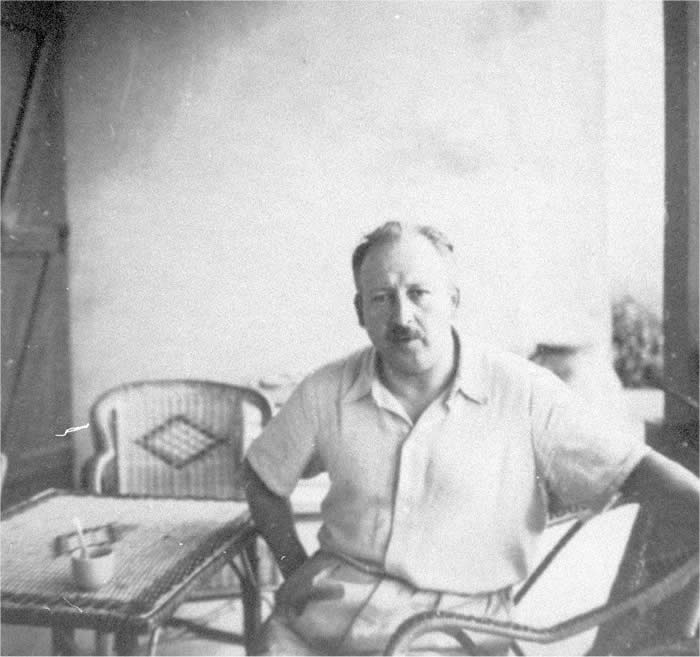
- Laforgue ca 1930
- Born: 5 November 1894; Thann, German Empire
- Died: 6 March 1962 (aged 67); Paris, France
- Spouse(s): Paulette Erickson (m. 1922; div. 1939) Délia Clauzel (m. 1939)
- Scientific career
- Fields: Psychology, psychoanalysis

René Laforgue (French: [lafɔʁɡ]; 5 November 1894 – 6 March 1962) was a French psychiatrist and psychoanalyst.

== Biography ==
=== Early life ===
René Laforgue was born in Thann, at the time part of the German Empire, to Joseph Laforgue, a copperplate engraver, and Eugénie Heitzmann. He received his education in Thann, in Forbach, and in Fribourg, before studying medicine under Franz Oppenheimer in Berlin; it was during his studies with the latter that Laforgue came across a copy of Sigmund Freud's The Interpretation of Dreams in 1913. During World War I he was mobilized in the Imperial German Army, at one point barely escaping death.^{:186}

=== 1920s–1930s ===
Laforgue completed his medical studies as an intern at the psychiatric hospital in Hœrdt in 1919. He received his doctorate in Strasbourg in 1922 with a thesis on affects in schizophrenia. After moving to Paris in 1923 he underwent a short training analysis with Eugénie Sokolnicka, who at the time headed a consultation office at the Sainte-Anne Hospital Center. Laforgue was then employed as an assistant at Sainte-Anne, and soon put in charge of the consultation office by Henri Claude. Laforgue was elected a member of the Vienna Psychoanalytic Society in 1925, and in 1926, along with Marie Bonaparte and eight others, he founded the Paris Psychoanalytic Society, serving as its president until 1930.^{:17}

A native German speaker, Laforgue upheld a correspondence with Freud from 1923, and the following year he met Freud for the first time, in Berchtesgaden. Despite certain theoretical disagreements, the two men remained on friendly terms, with Laforgue continuing to visit the Freuds on occasion during the 1920s. In his reminiscences of the couple, Laforgue portrayed Martha Freud as "a practical woman, marvellously skillful in creating an atmosphere of peace and joie de vivre".

=== World War II and later years ===
At the onset of World War II, Laforgue was mobilized as a military doctor in the French army. Until 1943 Laforgue maintained a correspondence with the pro-Nazi psychiatrist Matthias Göring, a cousin of Hermann Göring and director of the so-called Göring Institute in Berlin, who tried to develop an "Aryan psychotherapy".^{:187} Laforgue applied for membership of the Göring Institute twice, in November 1940 and 1941, and expressed interest in founding a section of the institute in occupied Paris, but faced rejection. His actions during the war have been described as ambiguous, as he is also recorded as having provided protection for Jews and concentration camp escapees at his home in 1942.

After the liberation, Laforgue was tried for collaboration after accusations were made by his former student John Leuba. His case was ultimately dismissed for lack of evidence, but would heavily tarnish his reputation among the French psychoanalysts.^{:258} From December 1956 to 1959 he lived in Casablanca in Morocco, where he had frequently travelled from 1948. Aside from founding a psychoanalytic institute there, Laforgue's interest in mysticism also deepened, and he adopted philosophical views which have been described as racist.^{:187} During his last years he reproached his former psychoanalytic colleagues for their "sectarianism", and instead became close to the teachings of Bruno de Jésus-Marie, a Carmelite priest and religious psychologist. Laforgue died following complications from surgery in 1962.

== Writings and theories ==
Laforgue authored several books and articles on psychoanalysis, albeit more popularizing than original. His studies on Robespierre, Rousseau, Baudelaire, and Talleyrand all reached a large audience and contributed to the spread of psychoanalytic ideas in France. Among his original contributions can be noted his work on schizophrenia, on self-punishment together with Angelo Hesnard, on the concept of the "family neurosis" developed together with John Leuba, and on the development of a sense of reality.. He also wrote a variety of articles on subjects ranging from the eroticization of fear in gambling, through the development of the sense of reality, to such defense mechanisms as psychological repression and isolation.

According to Élisabeth Roudinesco, Laforgue remained as much indebted intellectually to the French tradition of Pierre Janet and Henri Claude as to Freud;^{:20–22} and the tensions implicit in his competing allegiances contributed to his debate with Freud over the French introduction of the term scotomization. Initially welcomed as a description of the blocking of unpleasant perceptions in hysteria by Freud, the latter would swiftly turned against it, arguing that the terms repression and denial already refer to the same psychological process.

== Selected bibliography ==
- "Überlegungen zum Begriff der Verdrängung", in Internationale Zeitschrift für Psychoanalyse vol. 14 (1928), pp. 371–374.
- "The Mechanism of Isolation in Neurosis and their Relation to Schizophrenia", in The International Journal for Psycho-Analysis vol. 10 (1929), pp. 170–182.
- "On the Erotization of Anxiety", in The International Journal for Psycho-Analysis vol. 11 (1930), pp. 312–321.
- The Defeat of Baudelaire. A Psycho-Analytical Study of the Neurosis of Charles Baudelaire, trans. Herbert Agar (London: Hogarth Press, 1932).
- Clinical Aspects of Psycho-Analysis, trans. Joan Hall (London: Hogarth Press, 1938).
- "The Ego and the Conception of Reality", in The International Journal for Psycho-Analysis vol. 20 (1939), pp. 403–407.
- The Relativity of Reality, trans. Anne Jouard (New York/Washington: Nervous and Mental Disease Publishing Company, 1940).

== See also ==
- Angelo Hesnard
- Francoise Dolto
- Juliette Favez-Boutonnier
