= Scotomization =

Term for mental blocking of unwanted perceptions

Scotomization is a psychological term for the mental blocking of unwanted perceptions, analogous to the visual blindness of an actual scotoma.

== Controversies ==
This term initially was used by Charcot in connection with hysteria.

=== Psychoanalysis ===
Reviving in the 1920s this term, Rene Laforgue and Edouard Pichon introduced the idea of scotomization into psychoanalysis – a move initially welcomed by Freud in 1926 as a useful description of the hysterical avoidance of distressing perceptions. The following year, however, he attacked the term for suggesting that the perception was wholly blotted out (as with a retina's blind spot), whereas his clinical experience showed that on the contrary intense psychic measures had to be taken to keep the unwanted perception out of consciousness. A debate followed between Freud and Laforgue, further illuminated by Pichon's 1928 article on 'The Psychological Significance of Negation in French', where he argued that "The French language expresses the desire for scotomisation through the forclusif."

==== Lacan ====
Decades later in the 1950s, the question of scotomization re-emerged in a phenomological context under the influence of Jacques Lacan. Lacan used scotomization to represent the ego's relationship to the unconscious – speaking of "everything that the ego, neglects, scotomizes, misconstrues in...reality" – as well as to challenge Sartre's concept of the gaze. Most significantly of all, however, he developed it into his influential update of Pichon's concept of foreclosure, thus endowing that idea with a conflation of visual and verbal elements.

== See also ==
- Disavowal
- Fetishism
- Hallucination
- Scopophilia
- Splitting
