= Maxime Laignel-Lavastine =

French psychiatrist

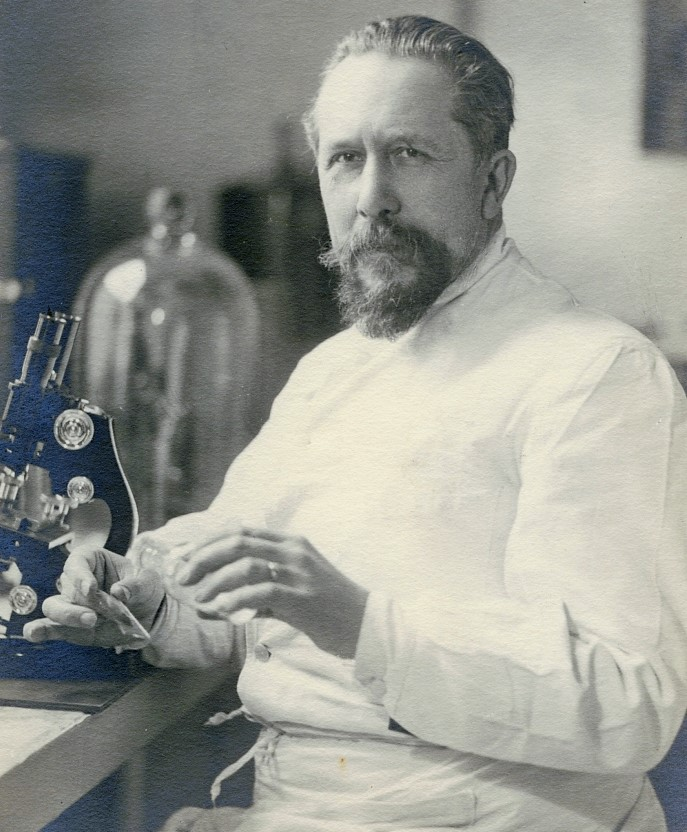
- Maxime Laignel-Lavastine
- Born: September 12, 1875; Évreux, France
- Died: September 5, 1953 (aged 77); Paris
- Occupation: Psychiatrist
- Medical career
- Institutions: Sainte-Anne Hospital Center

Paul-Marie Maxime Laignel-Lavastine, born in Évreux, France on September 12, 1875, from a family originally from Elbeuf, France, and died in Paris on September 5, 1953, was a French psychiatrist.

== Biographical overview ==
Maxime came from a family of several doctors: his maternal grandfather, Louis Bidault, received the 7th place in the 1842 Paris hospital internship rankings, and his great-uncle, Jacques Daviel, was the inventor of the cataract operation by extraction. After high school in Évreux, where he won the general competition in history and natural history, he began studying medicine in Paris and became a pupil of Joseph Babinski.

He was interested in neuroanatomy, neurology, criminology, and psychiatry. He was also devoted to the study of the history of medicine. Laignel-Lavastine supported the initiative of his pupil, Isidore Simon, when he founded the Society of the History of Jewish Medicine and he agreed to become honorary president.

At Sainte-Anne Hospital Center in Paris, he obtained the Chair of the History of Medicine in 1931 and the Chair of Mental Illness in 1939, succeeding Henri Claude, who was chair of Mental Illness from 1922 to 1939. (In 1942, he was succeeded in this position by Joseph Lévy-Valensi, who served until 1943.) His main and innovative activity was his teaching at the Institute of Criminology and Penal Law in Paris. He was also a member of the Medico-Psychological Society, the School of Anthropology and the International Society of Criminology. He was a member of the International Academy of the History of Science.

He co-authored a psychiatry textbook and, with V. Vanciu and Étienne De Greeff, published a criminology text. He also wrote a preface to a book by Alfred Adler, La Sens de la vie (Payot: ISBN 2-228-89531-8) (originally published in German as Der Sinn des Lebens, and published in its English translations variously as Social Interest: A Challenge to Mankind and Social Interest: Adler's Key to the Meaning of Life). The psychoanalysts Maurice Bouvet and René Held were among his pupils in psychiatry.

In 1933, he founded the journal Hippocrate with Professor Maurice Klippel. He was president of the International Society for the History of Medicine from 1946 to 1953.

== Works and publications ==
- Les Facteurs endocriniens du caractère (The endocrine factors of the character) (from the Presse médicale, No. 84, October 20, 1926), Paris, Masson and Co., s.d, p. 7)
- La Méthode concentrique dans l'étude des psychonévrosés (The concentric method in the study of psychoneurosis) ((clinical lessons from the Pitié, 1927), Paris, A. Chahine, 1928, p. 279)

In collaboration

- With André Barbé and A. Delmas, La Pratique psychiatrique à l'usage des étudiants et des praticiens (The Psychiatric Practice for Students and Practitioners), J.-B. Baillère, 1919.
- With V. Vanciu, Précis de criminologie : La Connaissance de l'homme, la Biotypologie, la Personnalité criminelle (Accuracy of Criminology: The Knowledge of Man, Biotypology, Criminal Personality), Paris, Payot, 1950, p. 282
- (management) Histoire générale de la médecine, de la pharmacie, de l'art dentaire et de l'art vétérinaire (General history of medicine, pharmacy, dentistry and veterinary art), Paris, Albin Michel, 1936, p. 683

== Distinctions ==
Named chevalier (knight) in 1921, he was promoted to officier (officer) of the Legion of Honour in 1938.

== Bibliography ==
- Lévy-Valensi: « Cérémonies médicales. La leçon inaugurale du Professeur Laignel-Lavastine » ("Medical ceremonies. The inaugural lesson of Professor Laignel-Lavastine"), in Paris médical, 1931, No. 82, p. 561-2, Texte intégral.
- Alain Ségal and Alain Lellouch: « Maxime Laignel-Lavastine (1875-1953) », in: Histoires des sciences médicales(Paris), 27, No. 3 1993, Notice en ligne.
- Allio G.: Laignel-Lavastine, un psychiatre « sympathique », [Thèse de médecine, Université de Caen], 1993.
- Isidore Simon (dir.). Numéro spécial consacré à M. Laignel-Lavastine, in Revue d'histoire de la médecine hébraïque, 1954, No. 21, 57–120.
- Simon Dr. « Maxime Laignel-Lavastine, historien de la médecine (1875-1953) », in Revue d'histoire des sciences et de leurs applications, 1954, Tome 7 No. 1. pp. 81–83. doi : 10.3406/rhs.1954.3382 Texte intégral.
- Stanciu V.: « Le professeur Laignel-Lavastine. Criminologiste », in La Revue d'histoire de la médecine hébraïque, June 1954, p. 4
- Frédéric Carbonel, « Notice sur la vie et l'œuvre du criminologue elbeuvien Laignel-Lavastine (1875-1953) », HAL-SHS, en ligne.
