= Closed circle =

Unfalsifiable argument

A closed-circle argument is one that is unfalsifiable.

Psychoanalytic theory, for example, is held up by the proponents of Karl Popper as an of an ideology rather than a science. A patient regarded by his psychoanalyst as "in denial" about his sexual orientation may be viewed as confirming he is homosexual simply by denying that he is; and if he has had sex with women, he may be accused of trying to buttress his denials. In other words, there is no way the patient could convincingly demonstrate his heterosexuality to his analyst. This is an example of what Popper called a "closed circle": The proposition that the patient is homosexual is not falsifiable.

Closed-circle theory is sometimes used to denote a relativist, anti-realist philosophy of science, such that different groups may have different self-consistent truth claims about the natural world.
