= Georges Heuyer =

- Born: Georges Jean Baptiste Heuyer; 30 January 1884; Pacy-sur-Eure, France
- Died: 23 October 1977 (aged 93); Paris, France
- Occupations: Physician, psychiatrist
- Father: Louis Heuyer (1847–1930)

Georges Heuyer (30 January 1884 in Pacy-sur-Eure – 23 October 1977 in Paris) was a French physician and child psychiatrist, who was appointed to the first chair of child psychiatry in Europe.

== Biography ==
He was the son of Louis Heuyer (1847–1930), a military medical officer. he died at the age of 93, was married three times, and raised eight children including three from his last wife, Suzanne Le Garrec, who married him in 1944.

Georges Heuyer defended his thesis for his doctorate of medicine in 1914, from which he obtained the silver medal, under the supervision of Professor Ernest Dupré.

Although not a psychoanalyst himself, he introduced the practice of psychoanalysis in a hospital environment, first with the Freudian analyst Eugénie Sokolnicka (whom he met thanks to the novelist Paul Bourget), then with Sophie Morgenstern to whom he entrusted a psychoanalysis laboratory.

In 1925, he was a co-founder, with Jadwiga Abramson, of the Clinic of Pediatric Neuro-Psychiatry in Paris. Heuyer wrote extensively on child psychiatry (ten books and more than one hundred publications).

== Publications ==
- Enfants anormaux et délinquants juvéniles. Nécessité de l'examen psychiatrique des écoliers, 1914 OCLC 1684936
- Assistance aux enfants anormaux. Création d'une consultation de neuro-psychiatrie infantile, 1925 OCLC 459306457
- Georges Heuyer, Claudia-Henriette Petot. Tétanos guéri par des injections massives de sérum anti-tétanique, 1926 OCLC 457580563
- Georges Heuyer, J. J. Gournay. Luxations congénitales multiples, 1926 OCLC 459306591|
- G. Heuyer, J. Longchampt. Considérations sur les convulsions essentielles de l'enfance et spasmophilie, 1928 OCLC 494019490
- Conditions de santé à envisager au point de vue du mariage dans les maladies mentales et nerveuses et les intoxications, 1928 OCLC 459306479
- Les Bourreaux domestiques, 1928
- Les Troubles du Sommeil chez l'enfant, 1928
- Le Surmenage dans l'enseignement primaire, 1930
- L'Hygiène mentale de l'enfant aux États-Unis, 1930
- La Sélection des anormaux psychiques à l'école aux États-Unis. Le service de Child guidance de Newark, 1931
- Les Principes de neuro-psychiatrie infantile, 1931
- Georges Heuyer, Jadwiga Abramson. Le Profil mental dans l'examen des jeunes délinquants, Le Profil mental dans l'examen des jeunes délinquants, 1931
- A. Rodiet, Georges Heuyer. La Folie au XX^{e}. Étude médico-sociale, 1931
- Psychoses et crimes passionnels, 1932
- Alexandre Lamache, Georges Heuyer. Le Mentisme, 1930 OCLC 459306598
- Georges Heuyer, Sophie Morgenstern. La Psychanalyse infantile et son rôle dans l'hygiène mentale, 1933
- Georges Heuyer, Louis Le Guillant. De quelques toxicomanies nouvelles, 1933
- Claire Vogt-Popp, Jenny Roudinesco, Georges Heuyer. Spasmes toniques du cou avec troubles spasmodiques de la parole entraînant l'aphonie, 1934
- Georges Heuyer, J. Feld. Amyotrophie sclérosante généralisée progressive, 1940
- Georges Heuyer, Dr. Combes. Hématomyélie par éclatement de bombe, 1941
- Narco-analyse et narco-diagnostic : histoire d'un procès, L'expansion scientifique française, 1949
- Introduction à la psychologie infantile, 1949, PUF; 3^{e} ed. 1969.
- Esquisse d'une psychopathologie des jeunes adultes, 1956, in l'Évolution psychiatrique, 2007, n° 72, ISSN 0014-3855
- Vingt leçons de psychologie médicale, 1966, PUF
- Les Troubles mentaux : étude criminologique, 1968, PUF
- Introduction à la psychiatrie infantile, 1969, PUF
- La Délinquance juvénile : étude psychiatrique, 1969, PUF
- La Schizophrénie, 1974, PUF
- Cyrille Koupernik, Robert Dailly, Georges Heuyer, M. Ribaillier. Développement neuro-psychique du nourrisson : Sémiologie normale et pathologique, 1976.

== Notes ==
- Annick Ohayon (2006). Psychologie et psychanalyse en France : L'impossible rencontre (1919-1969) (in French). La Découverte. ISBN 2707147796.
- Guey, Emmanuelle; Boussion, Samuel (2010). "Le fonds Georges Heuyer (1884-1977) : un XXe siècle scientifique, à l'orée de la psychiatrie infantile et de ses ramifications". Revue d'histoire de l'enfance "irrégulière" (in French) (12): 215–229. doi:10.4000/rhei.3201.
