= Athanasios Diamandopoulos =

Greek doctor and writer on medicine

Athanasios Diamandopoulos (Greek: Αθανάσιος Διαμαντόπουλος; born 1943) is a Greek nephrologist and writer on medicine.

== Biography ==
He was born in the town of Arginio, Greece, in 1943 and spent his childhood in Patras and Ioannina. He graduated from the Medical School of the University of Athens in 1967 and in 1974 finished his specialization in pathology at the Therapeutic Unit of the "Alexandra" Hospital in Athens. During the same year he left for Glasgow, Scotland, having won a state scholarship. He returned to Greece in 1978 with the titles of PhD from the University of Athens, Philosophiae Doctorem from the University of Glasgow, a specialization in nephrology, and a Scottish wife.

Upon his return he was placed at the Renal Unit of the Regional State Hospital "Agios Andreas" in Patras, where he still works as the head of the department today. In 1986 he became an associate professor at the University of Athens, and in 1996 he graduated in Archaeology from the University of Ioannina. During the same year he went to London, where he conducted research on the history of medicine at the Wellcome Institute for the History of Medicine.

He acted as president of the Medical Society of Southern Greece for seven years. He was president of the International Society for the History of Medicine from 2004 to 2008, the UNESCO Committee for the History of Medicine, the Greek Society for the History and Archaeology of Medicine and a member of the administrative councils of the International Association of the History of Nephrology, the Commission for the History of Nephrology and the International Society for the History of Nephrology.

He is the author of 16 books and more than 400 articles in Greek and international journals, including Nature, The Lancet and Kidney International. He is interested mainly in medical research, nephrology, bioethics and the history of medicine. He is a reviewer for The Times Literary Supplement and the medical journal Kidney International. Over the 30 years he has acted as head of the Renal Department of Agios Andreas, he has supervised more than 12,000 haemodialysis sessions.

He lives in the small suburb of Romanou, near Patras, with his wife and children.
