= Henri Claude =

French neurologist

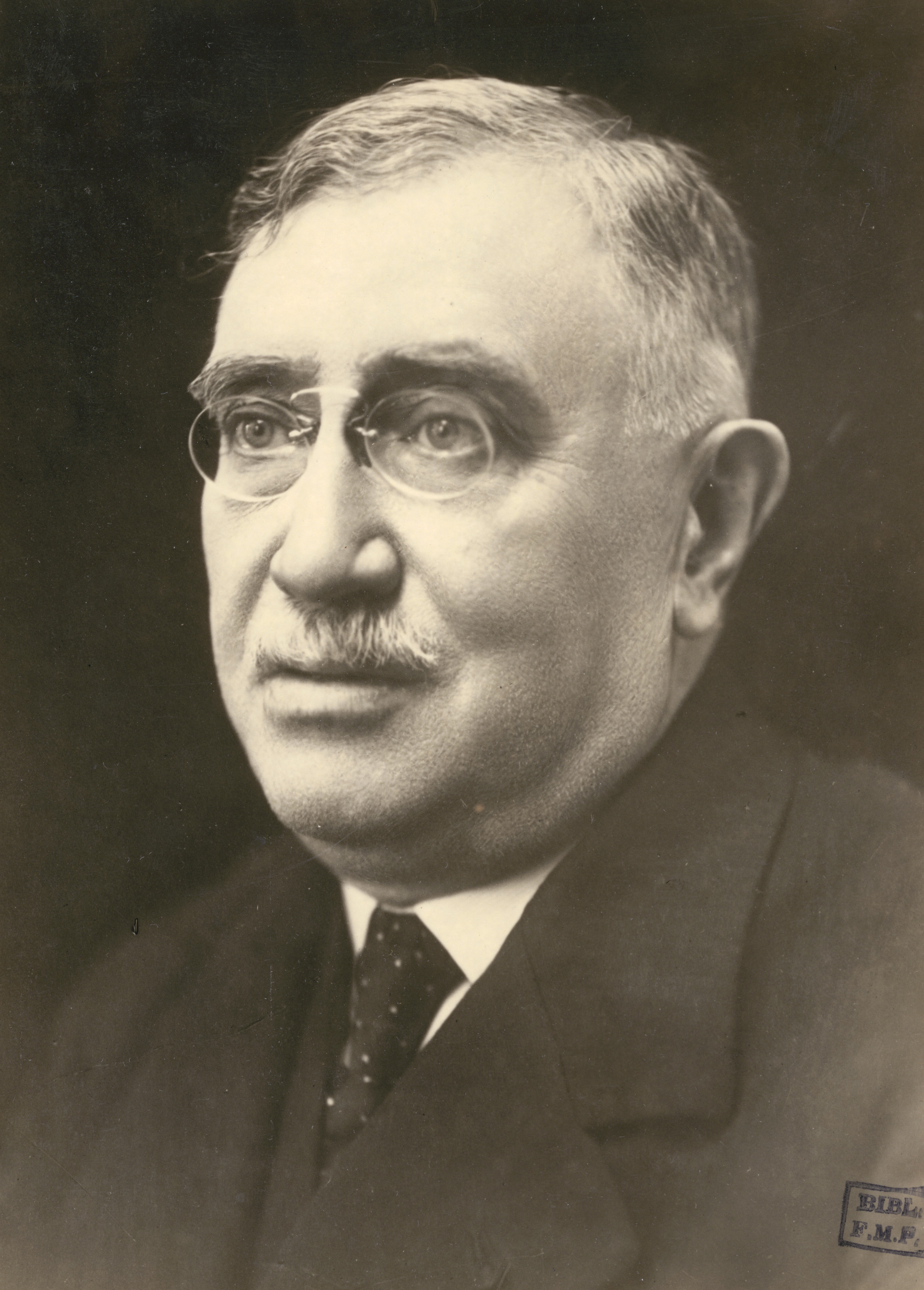
Henri Claude

Henri Charles Jules Claude (French: [klod]; 31 March 1869 – 29 November 1945) was a French psychiatrist and neurologist.

== Biography ==
Claude was born in Paris.

He studied medicine under Charles-Joseph Bouchard, and was an assistant to Fulgence Raymond at the Salpêtrière Hospital. From 1922 until 1939, he served as chair of mental illness and brain diseases at the Hôpital Sainte-Anne in Paris, where he was succeeded by Maxime Laignel-Lavastine.

Henri Claude played a leading role in introducing Freudian theories of psychoanalysis into French psychiatry. He was responsible for the creation of the first laboratory of psychotherapy and psychoanalysis at the school of medicine at the University of Paris.

His name is lent to the eponymous "Claude syndrome", which is a midbrain syndrome characterized by oculomotor palsy on the side of the lesion and ataxia on the opposite side. Also, "Claude's hyperkinesis sign" is named after him — a medical sign used to describe reflex movements of paretic muscles elicited by painful stimuli.

He died in Paris.
