= Sacha Nacht =

Sacha Emanoel Nacht (23 September 1901, Bacău, Kingdom of Romania – 20 March 1977, Paris) was a Romanian-born French psychiatrist and psychoanalyst.

== Works ==
- Le masochisme, 1938
- De la pratique à la théorie psychanalytique, 1950
- (ed.) La psychanalyse d'aujourd'hui, 1956. Translated as Psychoanalysis of today, 1959. Translated in Spanish as: El psicoanálisis, hoy
- La présence du psychanalyste, 1963
- Guérir avec Freud, 1971
