= Emmanuel Régis =

French psychiatrist, professor at Bordeaux university (1855–1918)

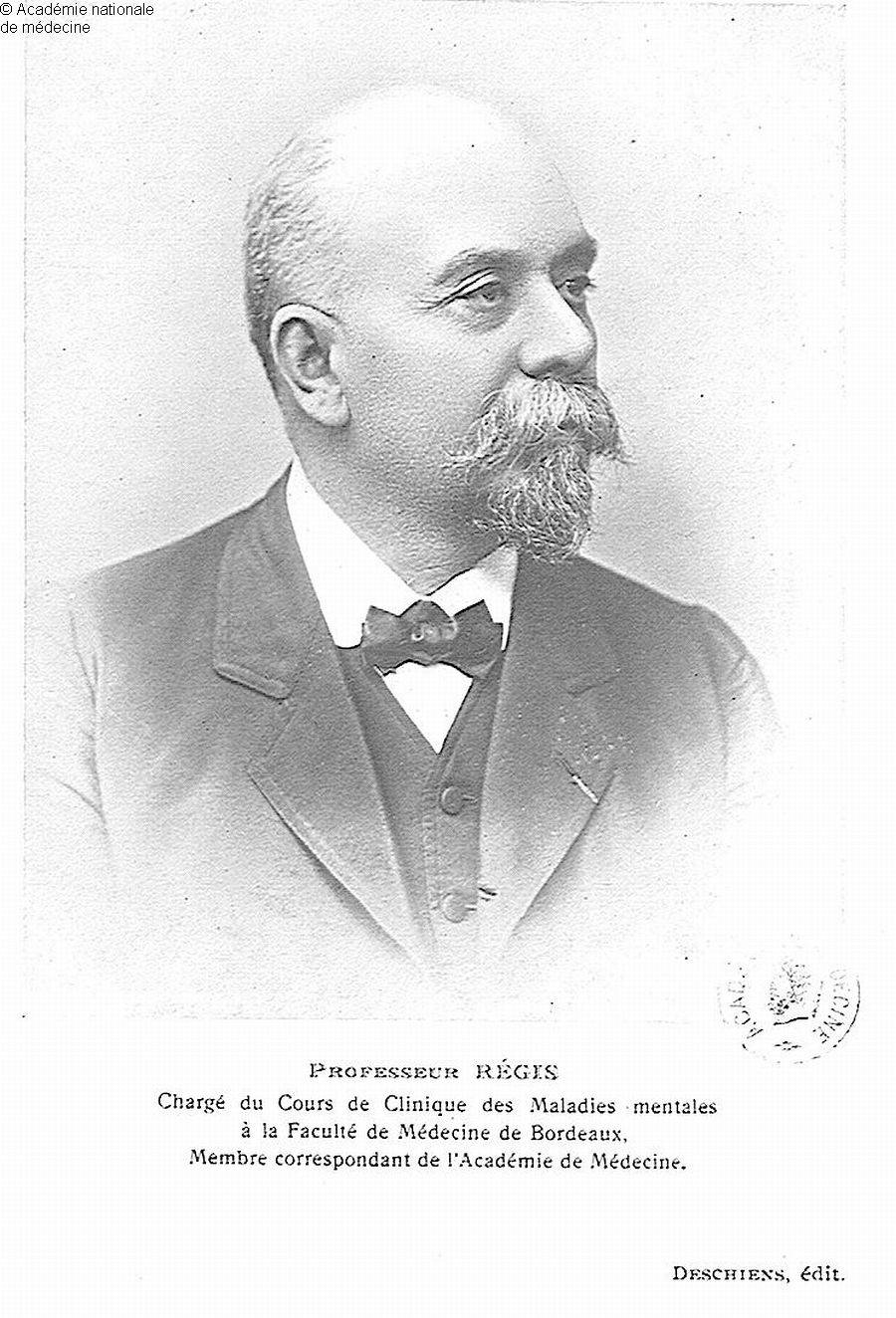
- Born: April 29, 1855; Auterive
- Died: June 21, 1918; Bordeaux
- Citizenship: French
- Occupation: Professor of Psychiatry

Academic background
- Education: Faculty of Medicine of Toulouse

Academic work
- Discipline: psychiatry
- Sub-discipline: forensic psychiatry
- Institutions: University of Bordeaux

Signature
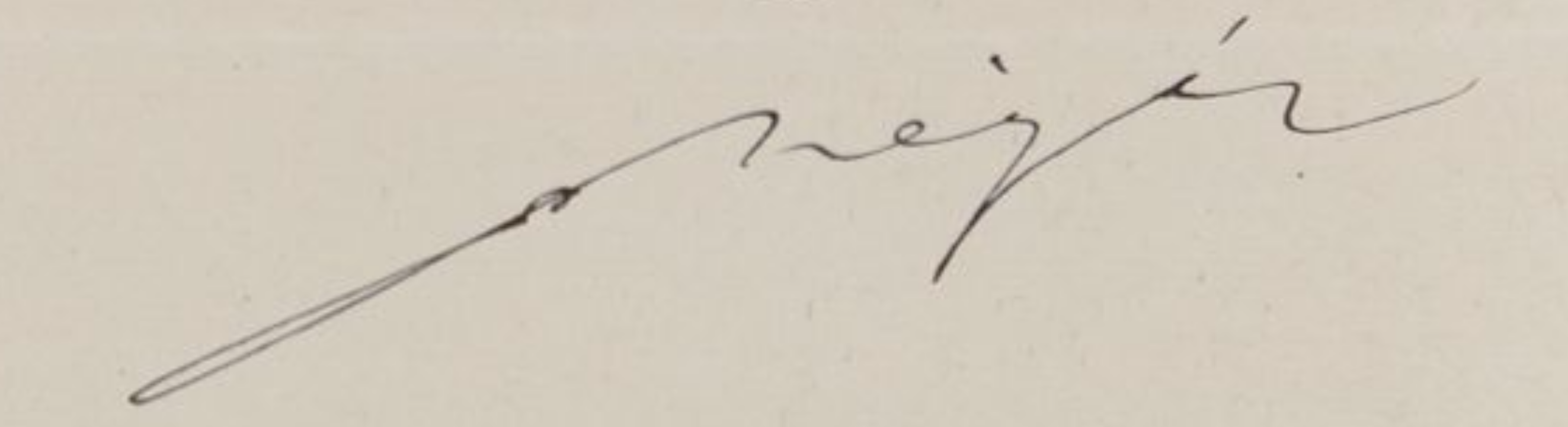

Emmanuel Régis (1855–1918) was a French neuropsychiatrist and professor at the Faculty of Medicine in Bordeaux, where he was the first holder of the clinical chair of mental diseases. He was one of the French pioneers of forensic and military psychiatry, and his Précis de Psychiatrie (Manual of Psychiatry) was published internationally.

== Biography ==
Emmanuel Jean Baptiste Joseph Régis, aka Emmanuel Régis, was born on 29 April 1855 in Auterive (Haute-Garonne) and died in Bordeaux (Gironde) on 21 June 1918. He was the son of Louis Régis, a doctor of medicine, and Marie Joséphine Gabrielle Apollonie Fornier de Lachaux. His elder brother was an artillery colonel and military writer, and his younger brother was a graduate of the École Normale Supérieure and a mathematician. He married Raymonde Henriette Marie Fournié (1856–1940) in Pamiers (Ariège).

=== Medical training ===
Emmanuel Régis prepared for his baccalaureate in Paris at a religious school run by the Priests of Saint Anthony on Rue Saint Antoine, where his uncle, the prelate Canon Régis, had also been educated. He studied medicine at the University of Toulouse, where he graduated with honours from the School of Medicine. He continued his medical training in Paris as a hospital intern. His calling to psychiatry may be attributed to a cousin, Doctor Linas, a former intern at the Charenton asylum in Paris and inspector of the asylums of the Seine. Régis became an intern at the Asylums of the Seine, initially at the Ville-Évrard asylum, then from 1879 at the clinic for mental pathology and brain diseases run by professor Benjamin Ball (1833–1893) at the Sainte Anne asylum in Paris. He then served as chef de clinique (assistant professor) from 1881 to 1882 in the same department. Benjamin Ball, the holder of France's first chair in mental diseases, was himself a student of Ernest-Charles Lasègue (1816–1883) and Jacques Joseph Moreau de Tours (1804–1884), who was known for his treatise On Hashish and Mental Alienation. Ball had a major influence on Régis, particularly regarding his medical approach to psychiatry, based upon the postulate that biological and hereditary factors play a key role in the etiology of mental illnesses.

During his internship, Régis was named Laureate of the Medical-Psychological Society and received the Esquirol Award (1879) and the Annales Médico-Psychologiques Prize (1880) for a study published in 1878 entitled Dynamics or functional exaltation at the onset of progressive general paresis. In 1880, he defended his medical thesis on La folie à deux ou folie simultanée, the title of which echoes the diagnostic term délire à deux, which was coined by the French psychiatrist Jules Falret in 1877. The thesis was awarded the Baillarger Prize.

=== Hospital and academic career ===
After his internship, Emmanuel Régis was shortlisted in 1881 for the position of medical director at the women's asylum in Bailleul in Northern France, but his appointment was rejected due to an anonymous defamatory letter sent to the senator of the town. The ten-page letter called his legitimacy into question by accusing him of medical incompetence (he was alleged to have failed to diagnose a hydatid cyst of the liver during a faculty examination), and by claiming that his successive promotions had been obtained thanks to family connections. The real motive for this attack was ideological. The author of the anonymous letter claimed that Régis was not a republican, and denounced his family's links with the clerical party, within which his father had reportedly been very active, supporting Mac Mahon's attempted coup d’état of 16 May 1877. Régis's contemporaries attributed his dismissal to the conflictual relationship between Benjamin Ball, Régis' mentor, and Valentin Magnan, also a psychiatrist at Sainte-Anne Hospital. The rivalry between the alienists at psychiatric asylums and the neuropsychiatrists at general hospitals may also have been a factor. A similar episode was to occur later in Bordeaux during the agrégation examination, pitting Régis' student, the neuropsychiatrist Jean Abadie, against the asylum psychiatrist Charles Perrens.

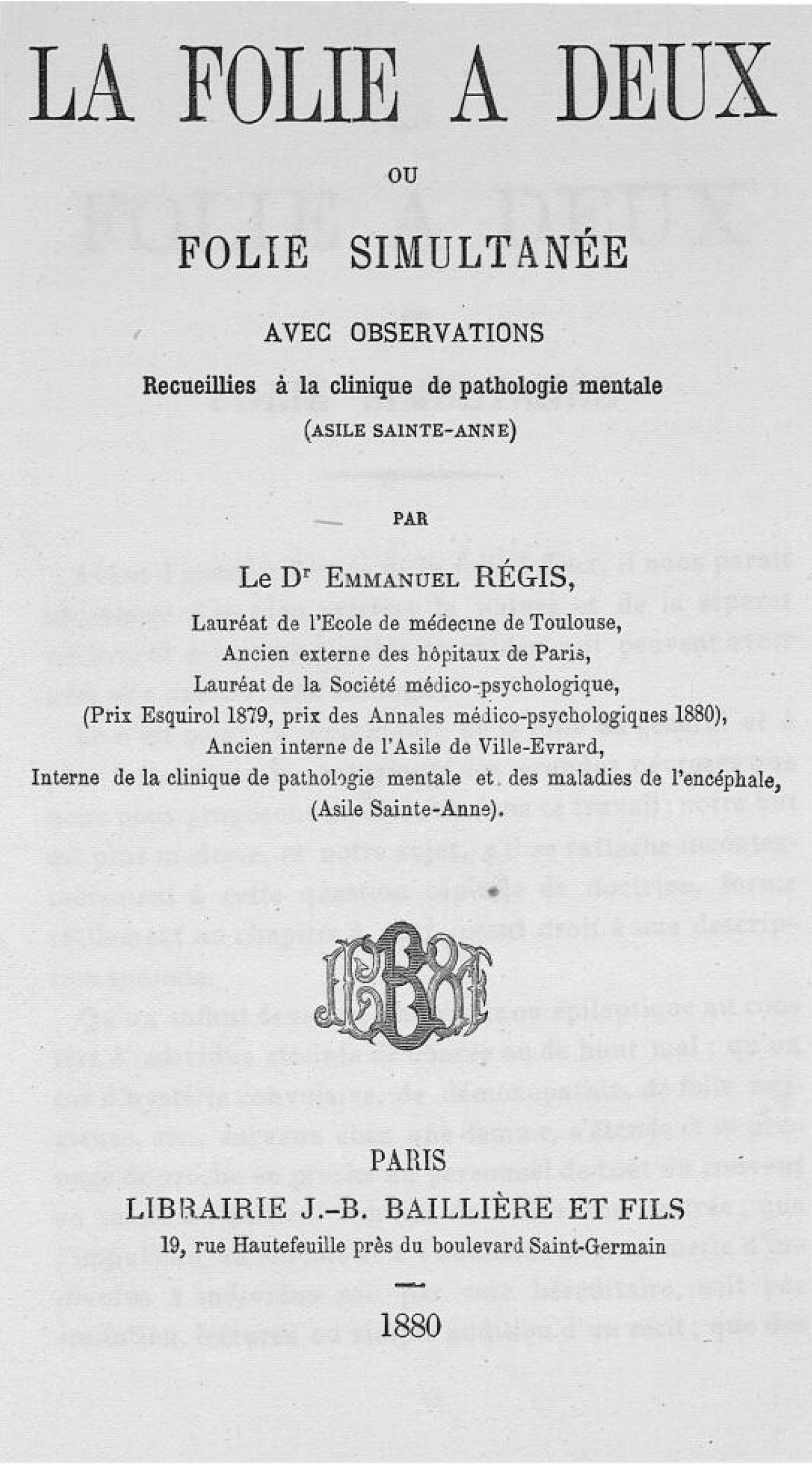
Medical thesis of Régis (1880)

In 1882, Emmanuel Régis accepted a post at the Castel d'Andorte clinic in Le Bouscat, a suburb of Bordeaux. This private psychiatric institution had been founded in 1845 by Doctor Desmaisons (1813–1894), a pupil of Jean-Étienne Esquirol. At the request of Albert Pitres, Dean of the Faculty of Medicine at Bordeaux, Emmanuel Régis began teaching psychiatry to medical students at Saint André Hospital in 1884. This open lecture series on mental illnesses, which received no official status for ten years, attracted a very wide audience thanks to Régis' teaching skills. The attendees included healthcare professionals as well as lawyers, magistrates and philosophers. Some of his students went on to achieve fame, such as Saint-John Perse (1887–1975), a law student, and Victor Segalen (1878–1919), a future doctor of the Navy. Segalen was a clinical trainee in Régis' department and defended his thesis in 1902 on the description of clinical psychiatric cases in literature. Régis also gave lectures in the faculties of law and arts, and foreign faculties sent specialists to him for training. Angelo Hesnard (1886–1969), a student of Régis, noted in his eulogy to him that "Régis’s academic work bestowed great honour on the University of Bordeaux".

In 1893, Emmanuel Régis was appointed associate professor, then full professor in 1905. On 28 September 1913, he was appointed to the chair of clinical mental health in Bordeaux, which was the first provincial chair dedicated exclusively to psychiatry. Régis was thus the first professor of psychiatry at the University of Bordeaux.

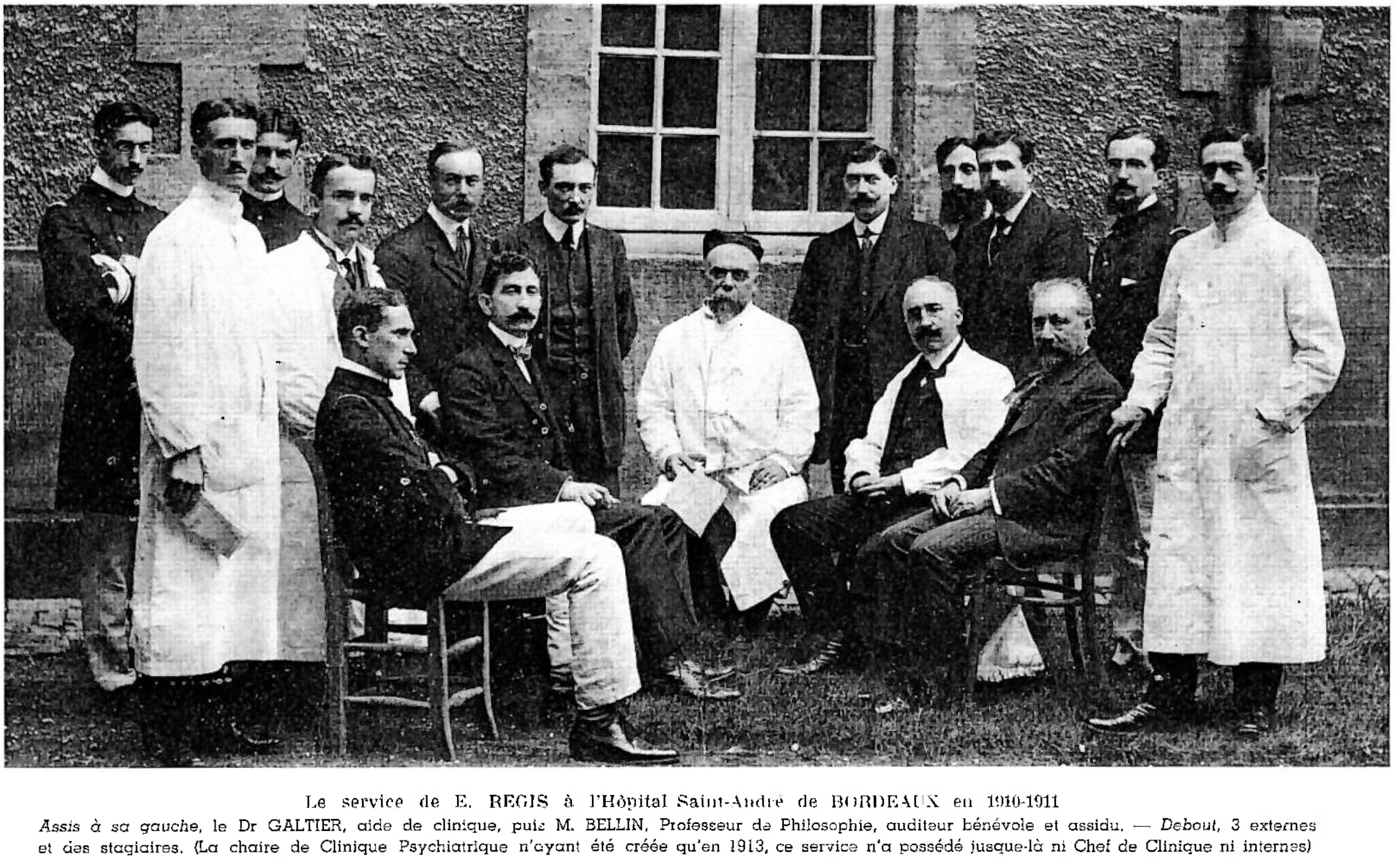
Medical staff of Emmanuel Régis at Saint André Hospital (Bordeaux, 1910–1911)

Régis initially had at his disposal for teaching purposes a few "cells" at Saint André Hospital in Bordeaux. These "cells" were described as "miserable" by his contemporaries. In 1902, Régis implemented the first open psychiatric ward in a general hospital in France. Comprising two rooms of six beds each (one for women and one for men), the ward was designed to hospitalise in dignified conditions the so-called "delusional patients at general hospitals" (délirants des hôpitaux). These patients presenting with acute and transient psychotic disorders could not be admitted to medical wards, where they "disturbed the peace of the wards". The creation of dedicated beds in the general hospital prevented them from being sent to an asylum, which Régis regarded as a "disgraceful measure", and enabled medical students to be trained in appropriate conditions. Régis denounced the abusive isolation of the lunatics in asylums where they had no contact with the outside world, a policy that deprived “these patients of the nourishment they lack most, namely the emotional, moral and social bond with others, in other words, human intersubjectivity”.

In 1902, the prefect of Bordeaux appointed Régis as deputy inspector of lunatics in the Gironde, and entrusted him with organising the Psychiatric Observation Ward at the Saint André Hospital. The ward was comparable to the infirmerie spéciale du dépôt (special infirmary) at the prefecture of Paris. It was created to enforce the Mental Health Act of 30 June 1838 on the mentally ill, regulating compulsory psychiatric hospitalisation for individuals "disturbing public order and the safety of persons". Individuals were observed for a maximum of three days in order to allow the medical team to decide whether they should be committed to an asylum following a forensic psychiatric assessment. The ward was relocated in the Jean Abadie Centre when this university neuropsychiatric centre was established in 1956 by Paul Delmas-Marsalet.

During World War I, Régis and Pitres co-directed the neuropsychiatry department of the 18th health region. They opened wards dedicated to soldiers presenting with psychiatric disorders at the Bordeaux asylum in August 1914. This was to be Régis final post. Deeply affected by the death in action on 20 October 1917 of his son Jean, an aviation sergeant, he died on 20 June 1918, a few months before the end of the war. His other son, Louis-Joseph-André Régis, defended his doctoral thesis in medicine on war amnesia at the Faculty of Medicine in Bordeaux in 1920, and subsequently became chief physician at the psychiatric hospital in Aix-en-Provence.

Emmanuel Régis was made a Knight of the Légion d'honneur in 1903. He was elected national correspondent of the French National Academy of Medicine for the anatomy and physiology division on 31 May 1910. He served as president of the Bordeaux Society of Medicine and Surgery (1909) and was a member of several international societies of neurology and psychiatry (United Kingdom, Moscow and the United States). He was also actively involved in organising numerous congresses, serving as secretary-general of the 3rd National Congress of Public Assistance and Private Charity (1903) and president of the 12th Congress of Psychiatrists and Neurologists of France and French-speaking Countries (Grenoble, 1902). He was a close friend of Egas Moniz (1874–1955), winner of the Nobel Prize in Medicine for the development of prefrontal lobotomy (1949), who often came to visit him in Bordeaux.

== Work and research ==
Emmanuel Régis' extensive and diverse body of work played a major role in the emergence of contemporary French psychiatry based on a medical and neurobiological approach, whilst remaining open to other schools of thought, particularly psychoanalytic ones. He was first and foremost a clinician whose research was based on the highly detailed observation of psychiatric symptoms and their natural course, and he was also a renowned teacher. In the tribute paid to him following his death, his contribution to psychiatry was highlighted in his eulogy:

"Thanks to Régis, the general understanding of brain diseases was transformed by the theory he championed, demonstrating that the loss of reason can result, like all other morbid conditions, from accidental causes of intoxication or infection: he rehabilitated patients suffering from mental disorders."

=== The Manual of Psychiatry ===
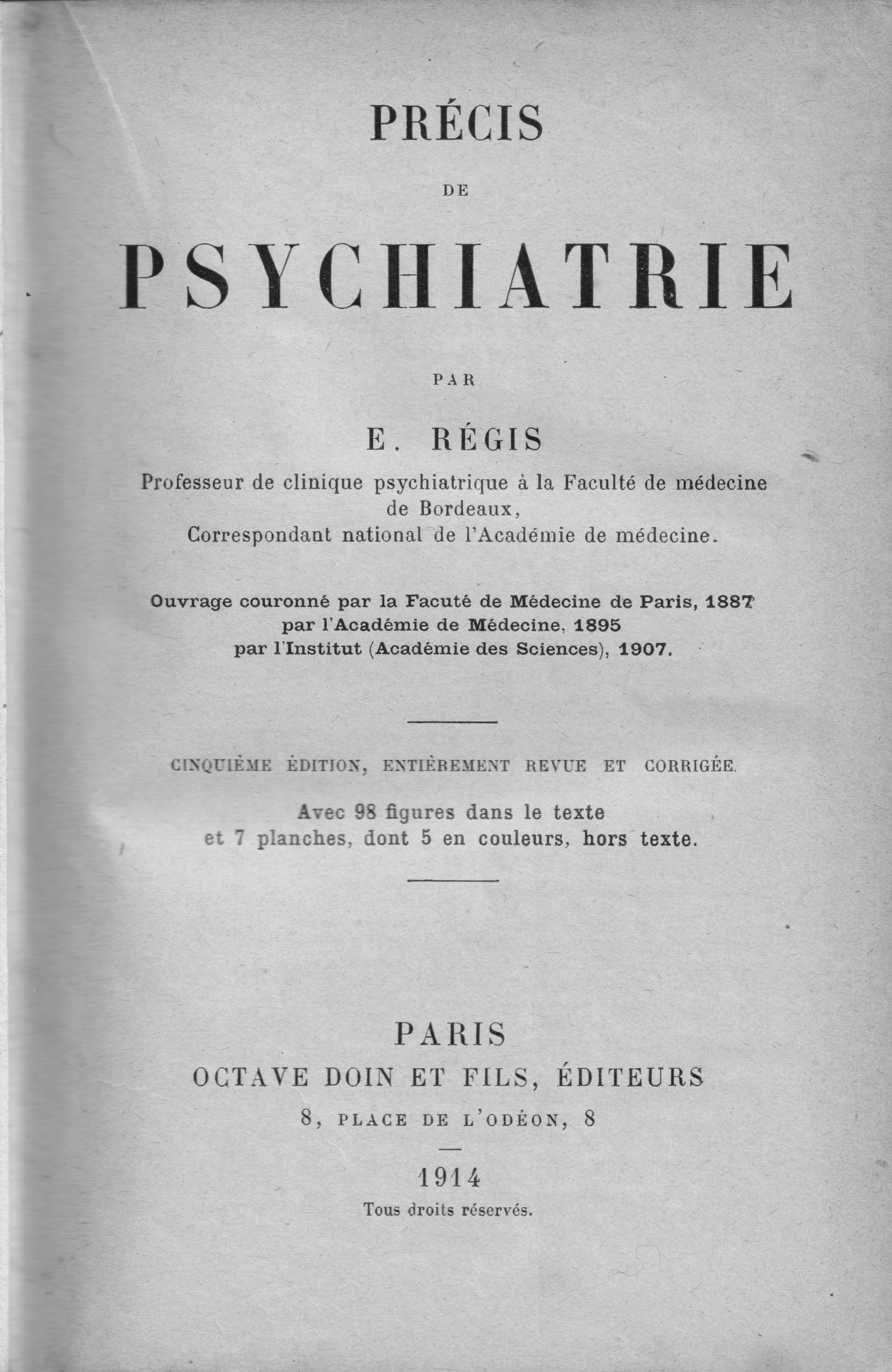
Manual of Psychiatry (1914, 3rd ed.)

Emmanuel Régis' renown was primarily linked to his teaching skills. His Manuel pratique de maladie mentale (Practical Manual of Mental Illness) was first published in 1884 (reprinted in 1892). In 1906, it became the Précis de Psychiatrie (reprinted in 1909, 1914 and 1923). This work was translated into several languages and its second edition was honoured by the French Academy of Medicine. The manual served as the standard academic textbook on French psychiatry for decades. This voluminous book provides an exhaustive overview of the state of medical knowledge at the time regarding psychiatric disorders. In it, Régis detailed their symptoms and their course, as well as the etiological and pathophysiological hypotheses regarding their determinants and the neurobiological mechanisms involved in their onset.

The Précis de Psychiatrie also served as a vehicle for disseminating his medical vision of psychiatry, and the need not to limit clinical observations to the most severe cases of psychiatric disorders. He wrote in 1914: “One of the major shortcomings of psychiatric teaching and psychiatric manuals, as they have existed to date, is that they have focused almost exclusively on cases of severe madness in asylums, leaving symptomatic psychoses in the background—those I call, because of the setting in which they are most commonly observed, delusional disorders of general hospitals.”

=== The anatomical-clinical model of general paresis ===
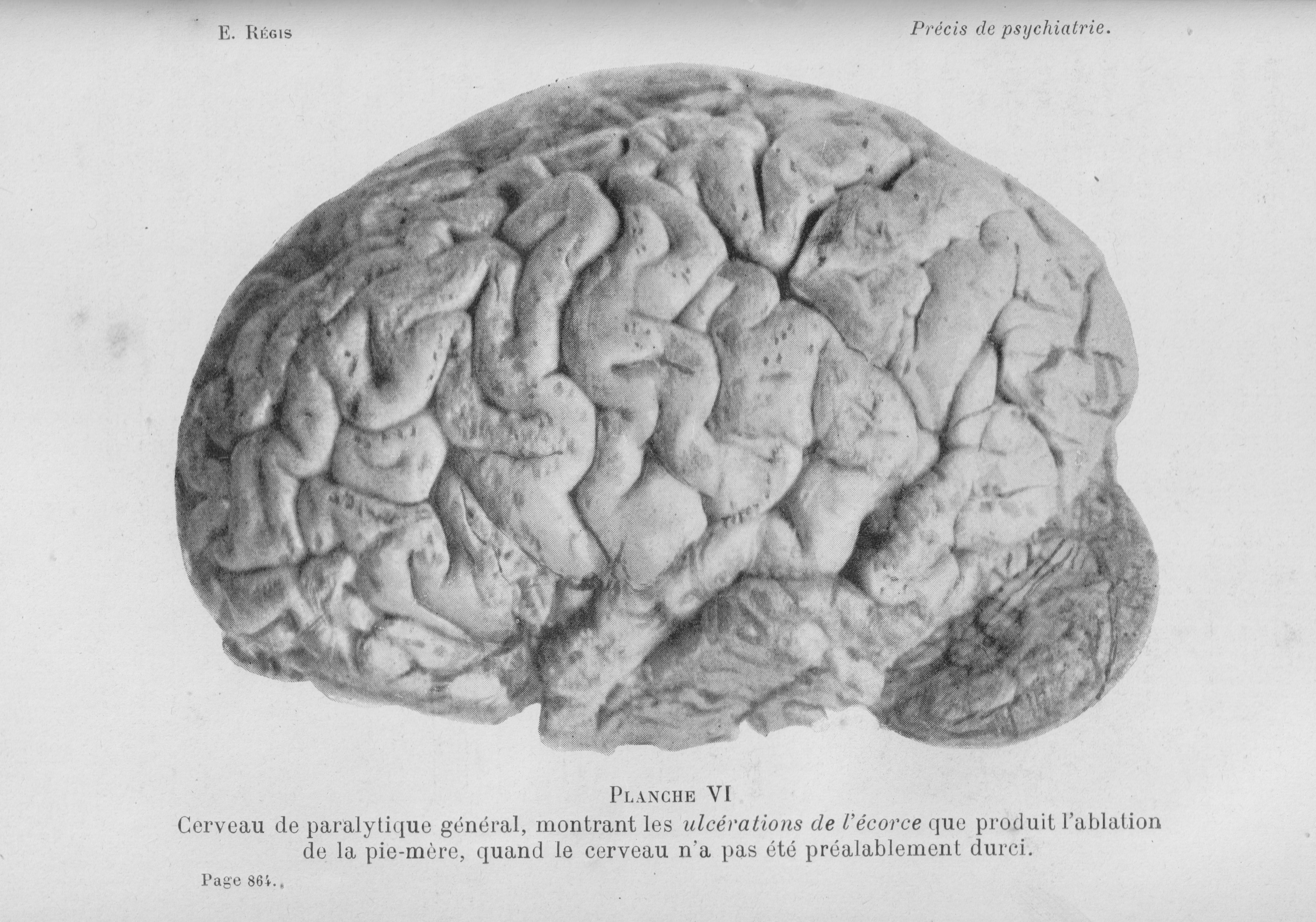
Brain with general paresis lesions (Précis de Psychiatrie, 1914)

Emmanuel Régis began his career with an article on general paresis, and subsequently devoted numerous other articles to this research topic, as well as a significant portion of his Précis de Psychiatrie. Régis's anatomical-clinical model of general paresis follows on from the work of Antoine Laurent Bayle, who, by demonstrating that neuropsychiatric symptoms were caused by chronic inflammation of the meninges, laid the foundations for a medical and organogenetic psychiatry.

From the time of his internship in the 1870s, Régis posited the then-controversial hypothesis that syphilis was the probable cause of general paresis. To corroborate this hypothesis, he published statistical analyses of series of patients hospitalised at the private psychiatric clinic Castel d’Andorte and Saint-André Hospital, showing that syphilitic infection was found in 85% of cases of general paresis. The conclusions of these studies were contested on the grounds that Régis had failed to provide evidence in 100% of cases: one of his opponents wrote, “How can one give credence to a man who, in 15 out of 100 cases, failed to find a history of syphilis?” The debate was settled in Régis' favour thanks to the identification in 1913 of the treponema pallidum in the brains of people who had died of general paresis, enabling Régis to include this major discovery in the 1914 edition of his treatise. His student Jean Abadie (1873–1946) continued his work on syphilis, notably by describing Abadie's sign, which is characterised by a lack of sensitivity in the Achilles tendon to pressure due to tabes.

=== The "autointoxication" model of psychosis ===
Caricature of Emmanuel Régis

The study of delirium (confusion mentale) was to the fore in Régis' work. He helped to clarify the clinical picture of this syndrome, which was identified by Philippe Chaslin (1857–1923), by coining the term "onirism". In line with the work of Jacques Joseph Moreau de Tours and Benjamin Ball, the hypothesis of "auto-intoxication" is central to his aetiopathogenic model of psychiatric disorders. According to this model, psychotic disorders are induced by toxic factors of internal origin (“poisoning of the body by internal humours”) or external origin (infections), leading to the onset of "more or less acute episodes of delirium".

The Précis de psychiatrie provides a detailed account of the research aimed at identifying these toxic substances by exploring “the composition, in the mentally ill, of various humours, secretions and excretions of the body: blood, gastric juice, saliva”. The "toxic psychosis" model emphasises the reversible nature of the disorders, so progression to a chronic condition is not inevitable. Thanks to his psychiatric practice in non-asylum settings such as general hospitals and private clinics, Régis was able to observe medical conditions rarely seen by asylum psychiatrists, where cases with chronic progression were in the majority.

=== Dementia praecox and the critic of Kraepelinian dichotomy ===
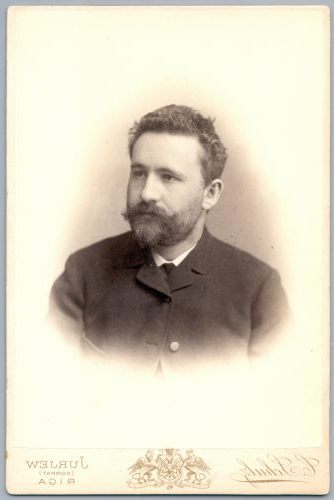
Emil Kraepelin (1856–1926)

Régis very quickly took an interest in the classification of psychoses developed by the German psychiatrist Emil Kraepelin (1856–1926), at a time when Franco-German academic relations were strained. Régis criticised Kraepelin' classification, which distinguished between dementia praecox and manic-depressive insanity, on the grounds of its "unmethodical" nature and its "imprecise" terminology. Régis underlined the fuzziness regarding the boundaries between the two diagnostic entities: "The difficulties in distinguishing between dementia praecox and periodic psychosis stem from the excessive scope attributed by some to dementia praecox, and by others to depressive madness [...]. The boundaries of each of these two psychoses are very poorly defined, and many cases are classified indiscriminately as one or the other depending on the author, or even by the same author at different times."

According to Régis, psychiatric categorisations must be based on the causes of pathologies and not on their clinical course. He challenged the Kraepelinian model of dementia praecox on the grounds that it does not occur exclusively in adolescents, that it “has no symptoms of its own” and "is not a form of dementia, even an incomplete one, since it can be cured ". On the one hand, he distinguished between constitutional or degenerative dementia praecox, which occur in adolescents who are "more or less mentally impaired beforehand" and for whom "the auto-toxic influence of the pubertal process" leads to a rapid and irreversible decline in intellectual functions"; and, on the other hand, "post-confusional" dementias occurring in the absence of constitutional predisposition, which are capable of remission without deficit. Régis considered that his own model of dementia praecox was "very similar to Bleuler's new conception of schizophrenia".

=== Work for the benefit of "abnormal children" ===
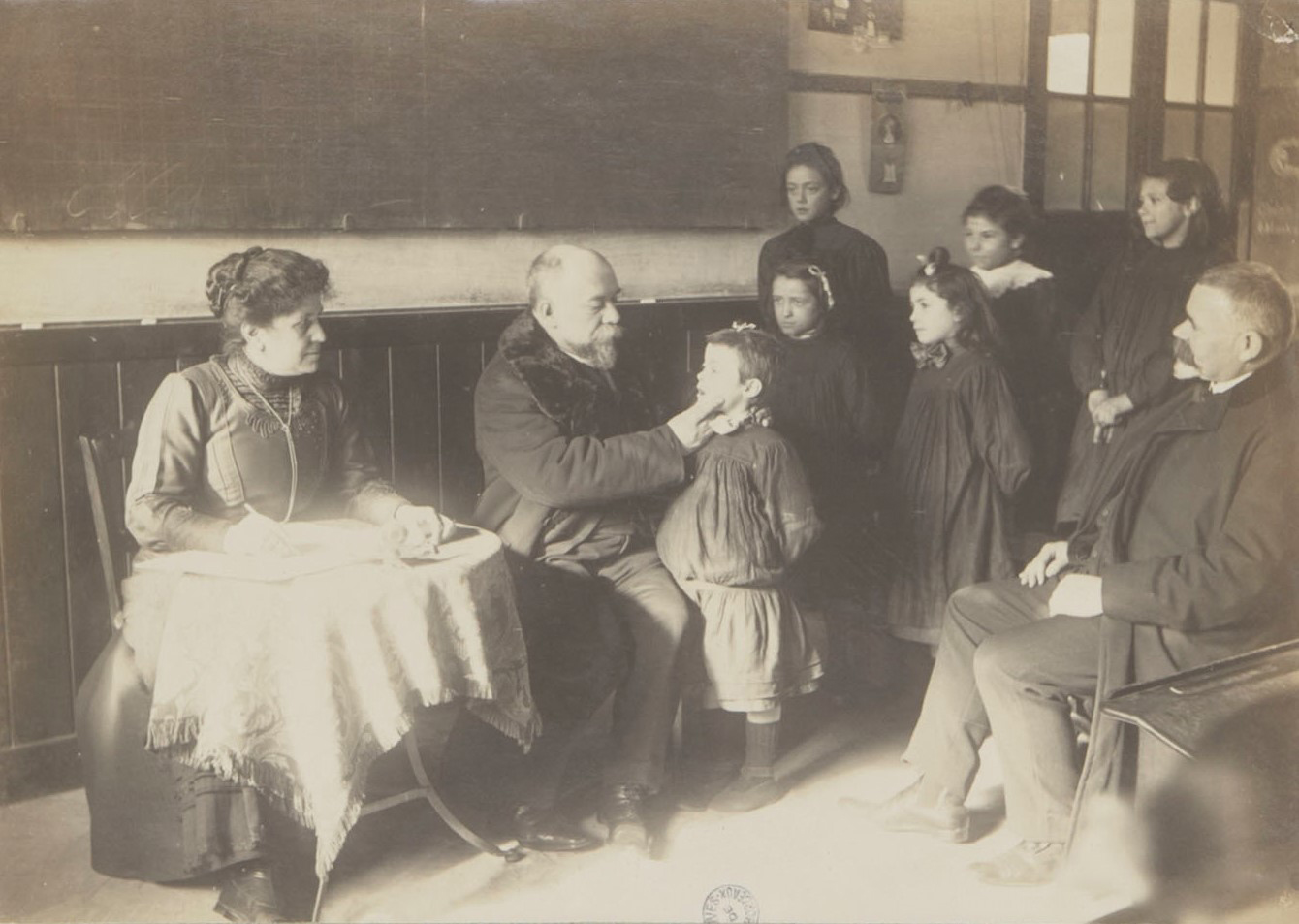
Régis performing a medical and educational assessment of “abnormal children” in Bordeaux

Emmanuel Régis was a pioneer in developing interventions for the educational inclusion of children with neurodevelopmental disorders. As early as 1897, he devised a plan for a municipal service offering free consultations for “abnormal children” in Bordeaux's state schools, which was officially established in 1900. The organisation in Bordeaux in June 1903 of the third National Congress of Public Assistance and Private Charity played a significant role in the project's subsequent development. Régis succeeded in convincing the school authorities that public state schools should take responsibility for the education of these children, which until then had been provided by private institutions. Régis established what he termed the “Work for Abnormal Children” (œuvre de l'enfance anormale). This project was aimed at educating the “abnormal children” of the city of Bordeaux by creating classes within state schools tailored to their level of disability. More than 1,500 "abnormal children" were registered from 1906 onwards, following assessment by members of the medical-educational commission set up in for this purpose. The first two classes for boys opened in 1907, and the first class for girls in 1908. Following Régis' death, the project continued under the guidance of Jean Abadie.

=== Forensic psychiatry and criminology ===
At the beginning of the 20th century, Régis was regarded as France's leading specialist in criminology. The guiding principle in his work was that the insanity of criminals should not overlooked, in order to prevent the "transformation of the lunatic into a defendant". In 1890, he published a book on regicides, a subject that echoed his own surname. His studies of cases of regicide aimed to demonstrate that crimes committed could be attributed to pathological states during which the individual had no control over their actions—states requiring medical care rather than criminal punishment. His analysis of the case of Caserio, the assassin of President of France Sadi Carnot, led him to conclude that he was not an anarchist, but a "madman" who should have escaped execution. He reached the same conclusion regarding Lucheni, the assassin of Empress Elisabeth of Austria, who was sentenced to life imprisonment and whom he visited in prison. Régis promoted the idea of creating a diploma for medical experts to train doctors in assessing whether offenders were criminally responsible or not.

Forensic analyses of regicides by Régis (1890)

The regicides in the history and in the present (Régis, 1890)

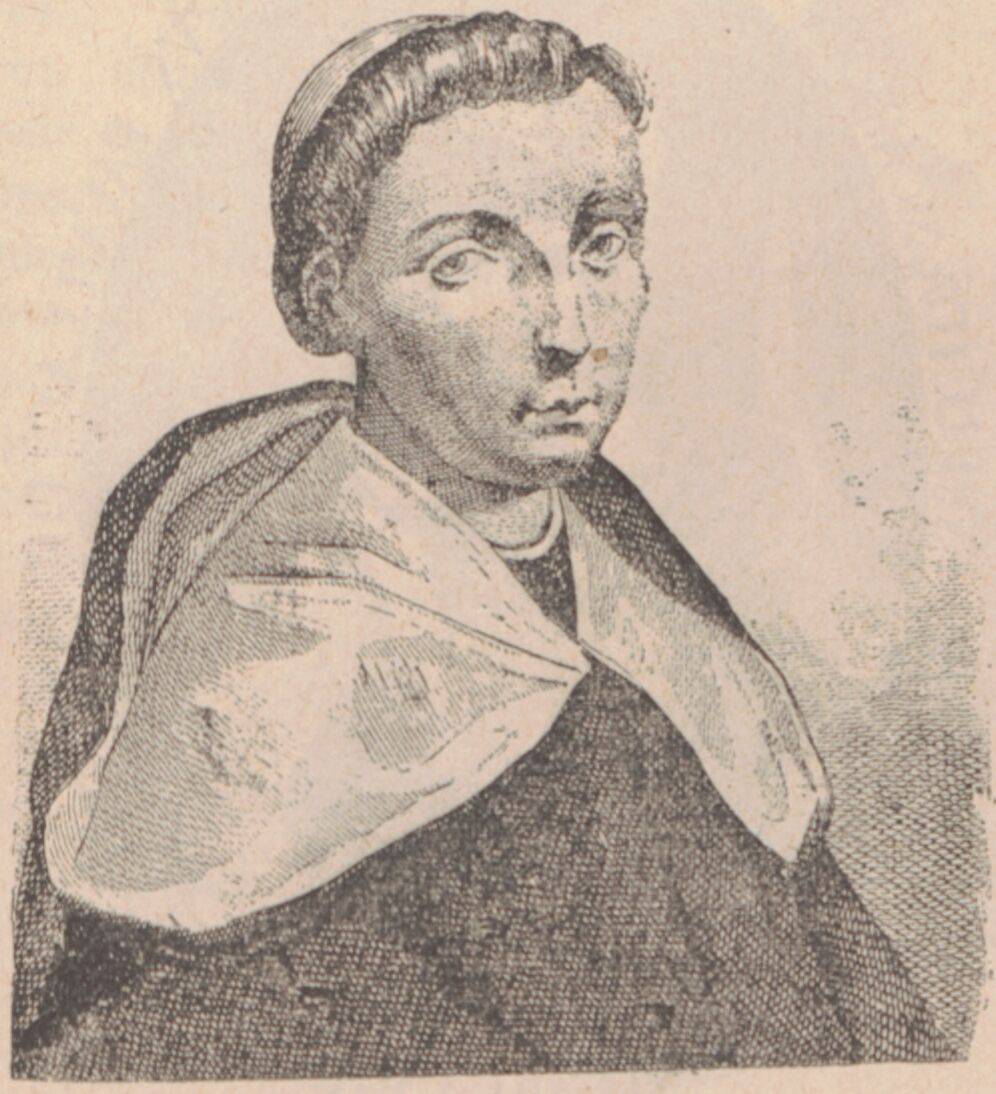
Jacques Clément (1567–1589) regicide of Henri III of France

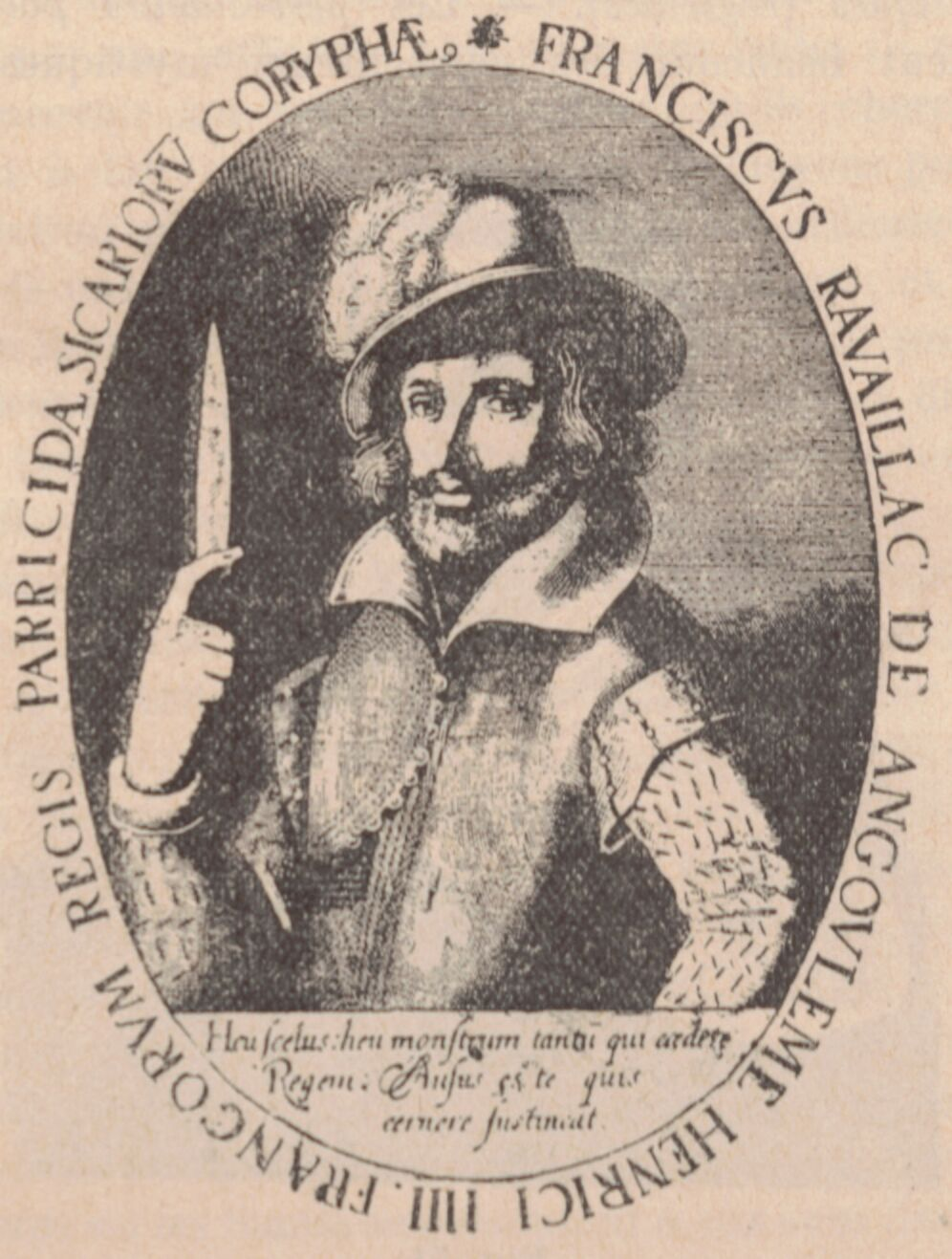
François Ravaillac (1578–1610) regicide of Henri IV of France

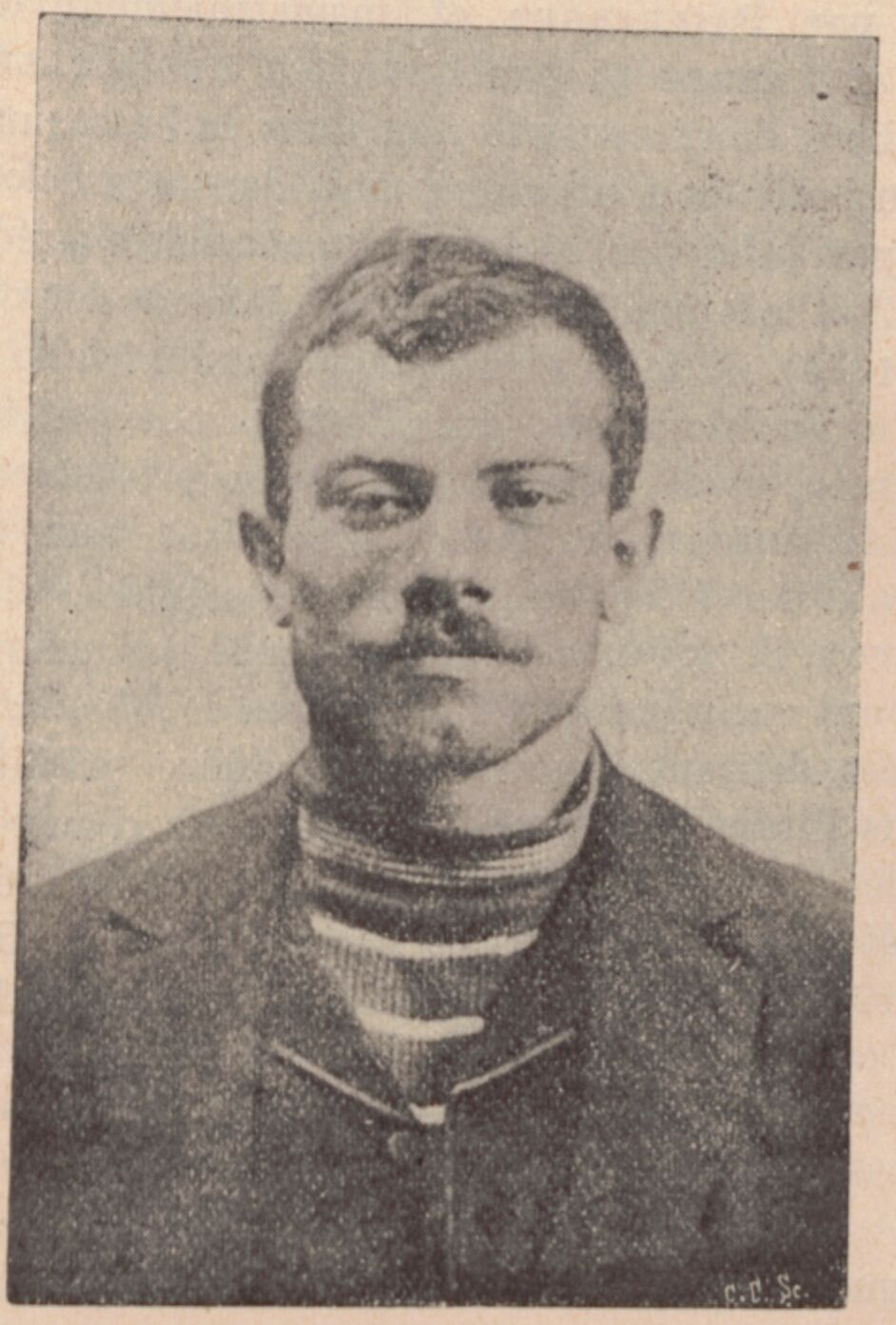
Luigi Lucheni (1873–1910) regicide of Empress Elizabeth of Austria

=== Military psychiatry ===
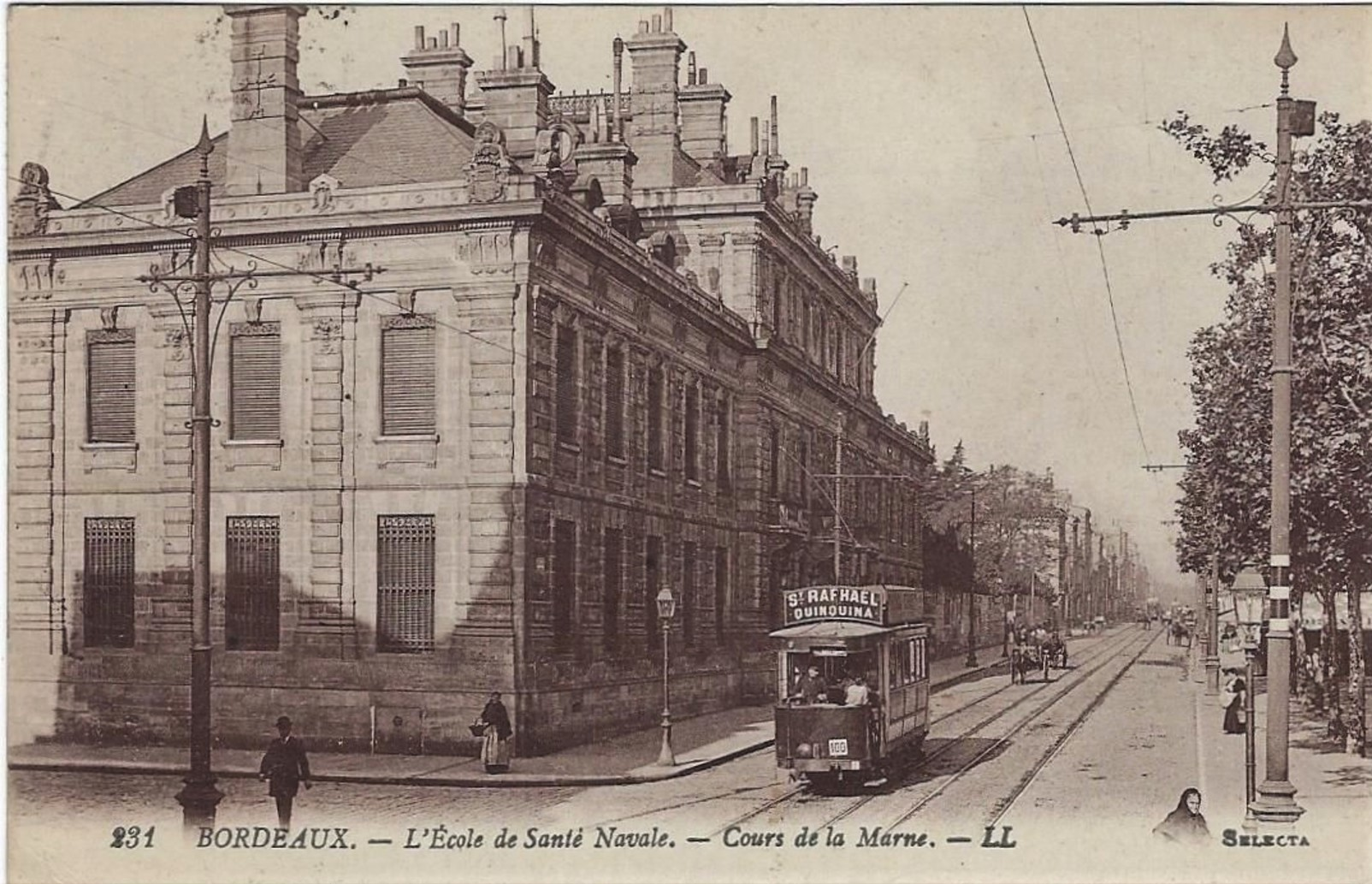
Bordeaux Medical Military School "Santé Navale"

Régis is regarded as the founder of military psychiatry in France. The main Armed Forces Medical Service School, known commonly as Santé Navale, was established in Bordeaux in 1890 and enjoyed close links with the Faculty of Medicine of Bordeaux. Régis taught the first courses in military psychiatry there and supervised the first medical theses on the subject. A chapter on military psychiatry was included in the 3rd edition of the Précis de psychiatrie in 1906. He authored several articles on the psychiatric disorders of war. The specialty of military neuropsychiatry was established around 1910 by the Ministry of the Navy thanks to the efforts of Régis and his students. With his assistance, his many students from the "colonial" army organised psychiatric departments in the French Overseas Territories.

At the 19th Congress of French-speaking Psychiatrists and Neurologists in Nantes in 1910, Régis suggested that military personnel facing court-martial proceedings should undergo a mental health assessment, to prevent them from being unjustly convicted whilst suffering from psychiatric disorders. With the same aim in mind, he promoted the training of officers in mental health and gave lectures at the Saint-Maxent Military Infantry School.

The final publication of Régis before his death was an account of his military activities within the neuropsychiatry department of the 18th Sanitary Region during World War I, in a report published in 1916 entitled "Military Lunatics Committed to the Bordeaux Psychiatric Centre: Statistics and Comments".

=== Contribution to the introduction of psychoanalysis in France ===
Régis' openness to new international theoretical trends soon led him to take an interest in the Freudian psychoanalytic theory. The first lectures and articles in France devoted to Freud's work were produced in 1913 by Régis and his student Angelo Hesnard (1886–1969). Hesnard, whom Régis asked to read and translate Freud's texts, carried out this task with the help of his brother, a specialist in German. In April 1913, Hesnard gave two lectures at the Saint André Hospital in Bordeaux on The Sexual Theory of Psychoneuroses, which were subsequently published in the Journal de Médecine de Bordeaux. In April, May and June 1913, Régis and Hesnard published three major articles in the psychiatric journal L'Encéphale on The doctrine of Freud and his school: a general bibliographical and critical review. These articles summarised Freud's work and provided a comprehensive bibliography of his writings. In 1914, the two authors wrote the first book published in France on psychoanalysis.

Hesnard and Régis were both laudatory and critical of Freudian theories. In his Précis de psychiatrie, Régis wrote in 1914: "Freud's theory, despite everything, is not without grandeur. It has the appearance not only of a psychological doctrine, but also, as has been pointed out, of a religious doctrine. This explains its impact and the passion with which it is either defended or opposed." Whilst emphasising that it is "one of the most important scientific movements of the era", Hesnard and Régis used a medical framework for interpreting Freud's writings. They regarded the psychological phenomena described by Freud, such as "complex", as psychiatric symptoms, and psychoanalytic treatment as a medical therapy. This opinion drew criticism, the most famous being that of Sándor Ferenczi in his 1915 article entitled Psychoanalysis as seen by the Bordeaux School of Psychiatry. Régis' contribution to French psychoanalysis was also praised by his contemporaries, such as Professor Ernest Dupré (1862–1921), who wrote in 1913: "Having demonstrated the systematic excesses and methodological flaws of this doctrine, you have, as a fruitful critic and generous commentator, highlighted the interest and psychological significance of a theory which, thanks to you, will henceforth be preserved in France from the irony of sceptics and the disdain of the ignorant."

=== Other works ===
Régis was the author of numerous other works on the clinical characteristics of psychiatric disorders, including hysteria, neurasthenia, obsessions and impulses, delusional and hallucinatory themes, psychotrauma, psychiatric disorders secondary to other medical conditions, alcoholism, etc. He was also interested in the clinical descriptions of psychiatric disorders in Shakespeare's works and in Sarah Bernhardt's interpretation of the character of Hamlet, as well as in the psychopathology of Jean-Jacques Rousseau and Molière.

=== Tribute ===
- In 1956, a special issue of the journal L'information Psychiatrique was dedicated to Emmanuel Régis. The issue included a comprehensive list of his works, as well as tributes from his student Angelo Hesnard and the psychiatrists Henri Ey and Paul Guiraud.
- Street (rue) Régis in Bordeaux

== See also ==
- Albert Pitres
- Jean Abadie
- Paul Delmas-Marsalet
- Angelo Hesnard
- Michel Bénézech
- Marc-Louis Bourgeois
