= Lasègue =

Lasègue may refer to:

- Charles Lasègue (1816–1883), French physician
- Straight leg raise test, also called Lasègue test
- Christian Lasegue, American guitarist and keyboardist
