= Albert Pitres =

French professor of internal medecine, founder of the Bordeaux school of neuropsychiatry

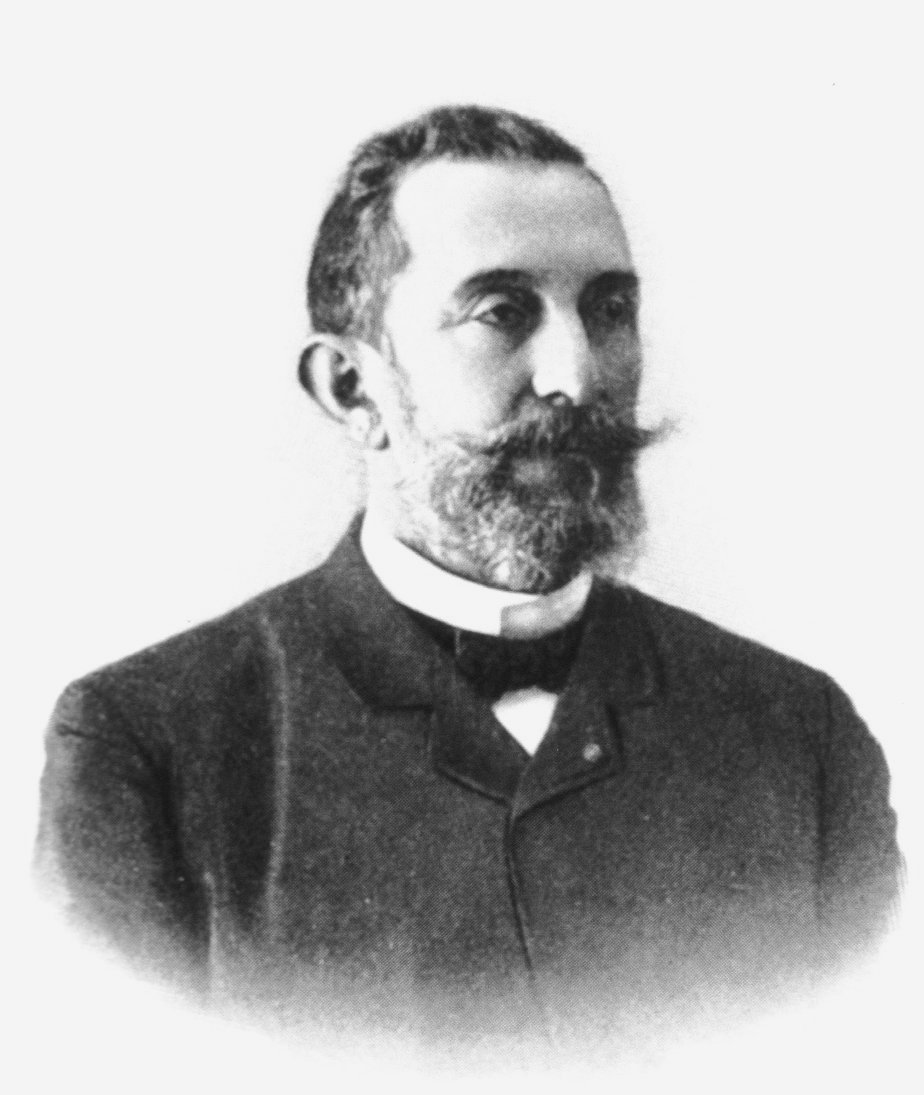
- Born: Jean Marie Marcel Albert Pitres; 26 August 1848; Bordeaux, France
- Died: 25 March 1928 (aged 79); Bordeaux, France

Academic background
- Education: University of Bordeaux
- Doctoral advisor: Jean-Martin Charcot

Academic work
- Discipline: Neuropsychiatry
- Institutions: Salpêtrière Hospital

Signature
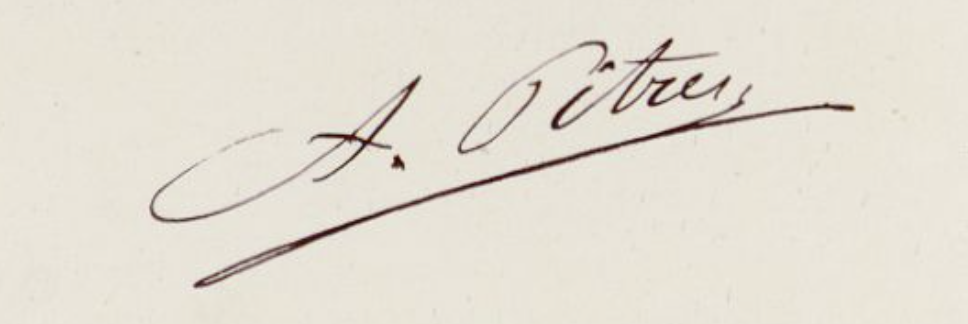

Albert Pitres, born on 26 August 1848 and died on 25 March 1928, was a French medical doctor, professor of internal medicine at the Faculty of Medicine of Bordeaux, who founded the Bordeaux school of neuropsychiatry. As the student and collaborator of Jean Martin Charcot (1825–1893) at the Hôpital de la Salpêtrière in Paris, he contributed to research into cerebral localisation, language disorders, peripheral neuropathies and obsessions. As dean of the Faculty of Medicine and Pharmacy in Bordeaux for some twenty years, his contribution was key to the construction of a university campus dedicated to this faculty. The permanence of the military medical school in Bordeaux can be largely attributed to him. He established the first provincial chair of psychiatry in Bordeaux for his collaborator Emmanuel Régis (1855–1918).

== Biography ==
Jean Marie Marcel Albert Pitres, known as Albert Pitres was born on 26 August 1848 at 13 Rue Traversière (now Rue Albert Pitres) in Bordeaux (Gironde). He died on 25 March 1928 in Bordeaux, where he lived at 119 Cours d’Alsace-Lorraine, at the age of 79, after falling down stairs. He was the son of Jean Adolphe Pitres, a landowner, and Madelaine Corali Rousseille, a grocer. As his father died when Pitres was eight years old, and his mother had few resources, he was the mainstay for his family. On 5 August 1880, he married Jeanne Trabut-Cussac (1860–1932), with whom he had five children. His first son, Jean Henri (1881–1881), died at the age of two months, his second, Jean Gustave (1882–1909), died at the age of 26 from pulmonary tuberculosis, and his youngest son, Edgard Jean Paul (1889–1971), became a bacteriologist.

=== Education ===
Albert Pitre began his medical studies in Bordeaux, in 1866 in Bordeaux at the St Côme School of Medicine and Surgery and at Saint André Hospital. From 1867 to 1870, he was an intern and then a clinical assistant to Professor Henri Gintrac (1820–1878), who held the Chair of clinical medicine. Henri was the son of Élie Gintrac(1791-1877), who played a major role in transforming the medical school into a faculty of Medicine and Pharmacy.

Albert Pitres served as an auxiliary doctor during the Franco-Prussian War of 1870. He then moved to Paris and, on the advice of Elie Gintrac, travelled throughout North America and the Mediterranean region for a year. He passed the medical internship entrance examination in Paris in 1872 and served as an interne to the hospitals of Paris. Two of his placements were at the Hôpital de la Salpêtrière: in 1874 in the department of Jacques-Joseph Moreau de Tours (1804–1884), and then, towards the end of his internship in 1876, in the department of Jean-Martin Charcot (1825–1893). In 1877, he defended his doctoral thesis supervised by Charcot.

In the late 1870s, together with his friend Charles-Émile François-Franck, who was also an intern, Albert Pitres trained in physiological research in the laboratory of Étienne-Jules Marey (1830–1904) at the Collège de France, where he performed studies on epilepsy and on the excitation of the cerebral cortex. He also trained in anatomical pathology whilst working as a laboratory assistant in the laboratory of Louis-Antoine Ranvier (1835–1922), founder of the first Chair of histology at the Collège de France.

=== Hospital and academic career at Hôpital de la Salpêtrière (Paris) ===
After completing his internship, Albert Pitres served as assistant professor at the faculty of medicine and as a teaching assistant at the École des Hautes Études in the histology laboratory (1877–1878). He was also secretary of the Anatomical Society of Paris. He became a close collaborator and friend of the neurologist Jean-Martin Charcot. In Charcot's department at the Hôpital de la Salpêtrière, Pitres worked alongside the neurologists Joseph Babinski, Georges Gilles de la Tourette, Joseph-Jules Déjerine and Pierre Marie. Albert Pitres passed the agrégation examination in medicine in 1878, with a dissertation on cardiac hypertrophy titled Les hypertrophies et les dilatations cardiaques indépendante des lésions valvulaires.

=== Hospital and academic career in Bordeaux ===
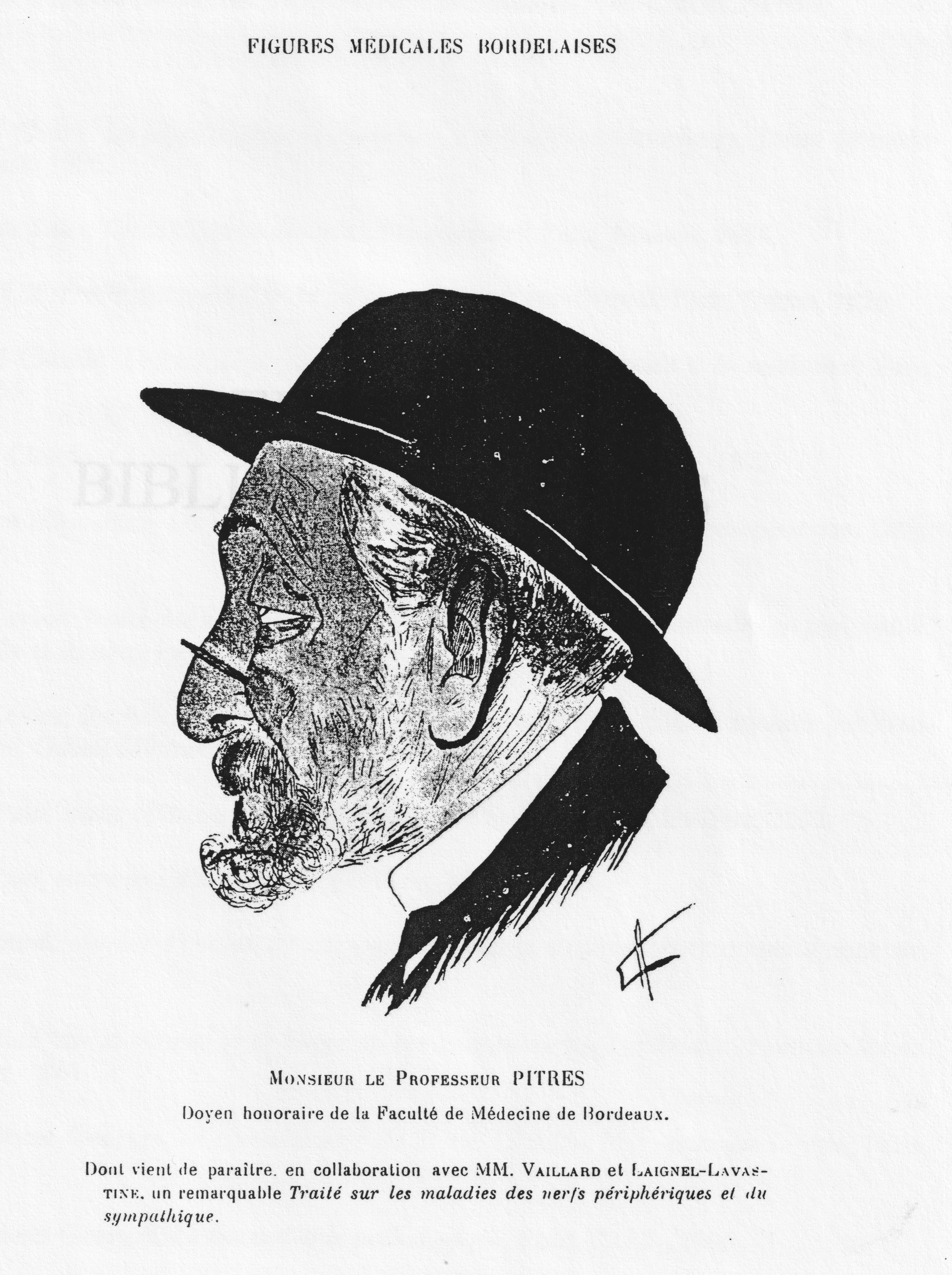
Caricature of Albert Pitres (1906)

In 1878, Henri Gintrac, then Dean of the new Faculty of Medicine and Pharmacy, asked Albert Pitres to return to Bordeaux. Pitres felt duty bound to leave Paris because he needed a position that would enable him to provide for his family. In 1878, he became practitioner of Bordeaux Hospitals. From that date until the end of his career, he carried out his clinical duties at Saint André Hospital.

Initially a lecturer in general anatomy and histology, he became a full professor of general anatomy and histology in 1880, then a full professor occupying the prestigious Chair of internal clinic in 1881, where he succeeded Professor Jules Marit. In 1885, at the age of 37, the rector of the academy asked Pitres to become Dean of the Faculty of Medicine and Pharmacy, to replace Paul Dénucé (1824–1889), who was stepping down due to health problems. Pitres was elected on 14 November 1885 and held the position until 16 January 1898. After a six-year gap during which Pitres was replaced by Barthélémy de Nabias (1860–1908), he served as Dean again from 19 January 1904 to 18 January 1915.

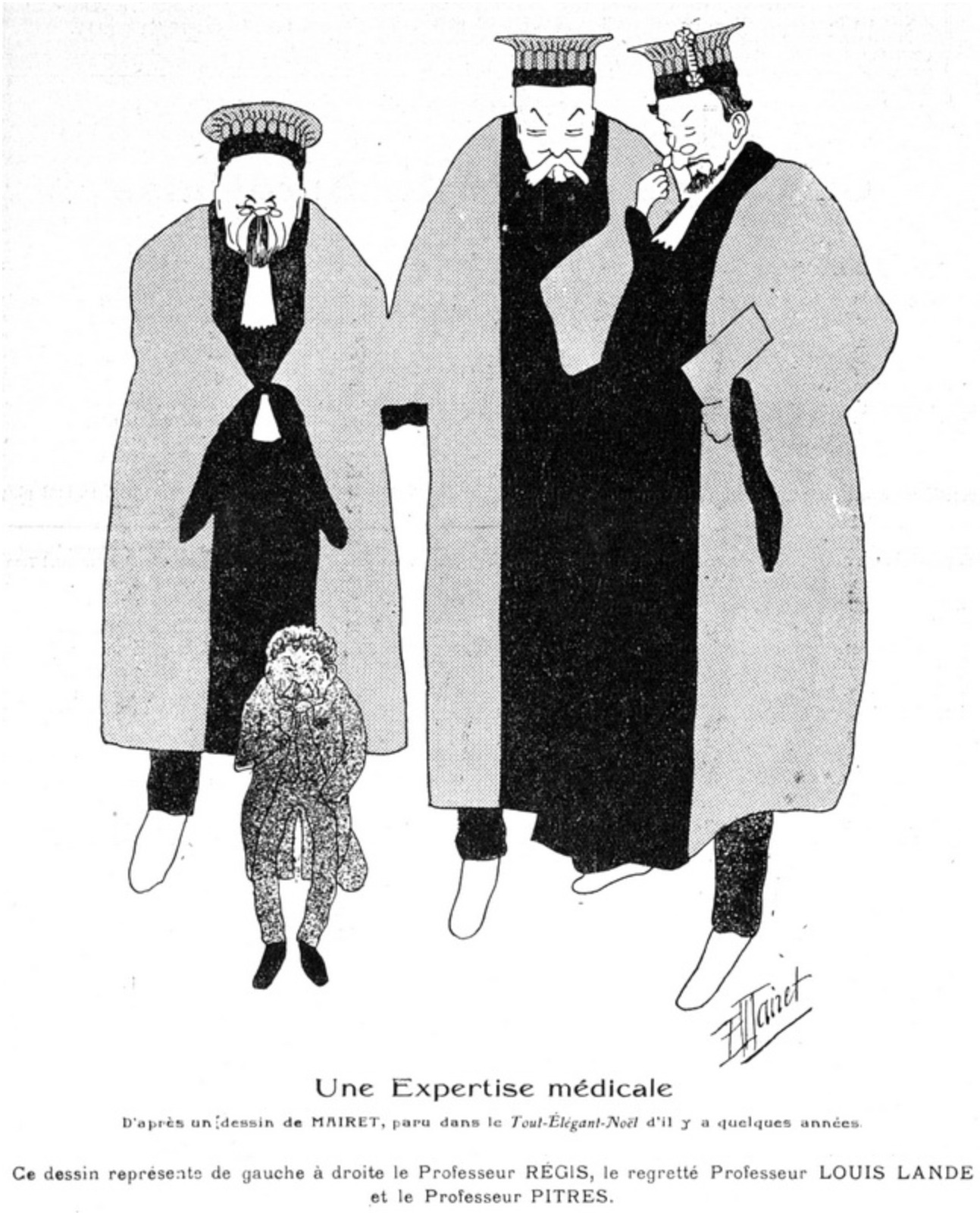
Forensic medical assessment with Pitres and Régis (1913)

During World War I, Pitres and his collaborator Emmanuel Régis headed the Military Department of Neuropsychiatry of the 18th Sanitary Region. In August 1914, they opened wards reserved for soldiers with psychiatric disorders at the Bordeaux asylum. Albert Pitres retired in 1919. Régis, who held the clinical Chair of mental diseases, died in 1918, so Pitres' student Jean Abadie succeeded him in the Chair. Albert Pitres was admired and loved by his students, and was regarded by his contemporaries as a remarkable teacher and clinician, possessing brillaint intelligence combined with great kindness and humour.

In 1887, Albert Pitres was awarded the Lallemant Prize by the French Academy of Sciences and the Montyon Prize by the French National Academy of Medicine in 1898. He became a corresponding member of the Academy of Medicine in 1888 and a full member in 1889. He was a corresponding member of the French Academy of Moral Sciences for the philosophy section (1923–1928), as well as a member of the Society of Biology and the Medico-Psychological Society. He was appointed Officer of the Order of Public Instruction on 10 January 1892, Knight of the Légion d'Honneur on 25 April 1888, then Officer on 2 January 1904, and finally Commander on 9 August 1913, the highest possible distinction.

== Work and research ==
=== Research on cerebral localisations ===
Albert Pitres's early research focus was on experimental physiology. Under Charcot's influence, he subsequently adopted a clinical and empirical approach with studies based on anatomo-clinical and anatomical pathological methods. Following on from the work of Paul Broca, he conducted studies in collaboration with Charcot on the cerebral localisations in 108 patients. This pioneering work enabled the identification of motor cortex areas, and demonstrated that motor cortex lesions lead to degeneration of the pyramidal tracts. He developed a technique for the serial sectioning of the brain known as "Pitres' sections". On 26 May 1877, Albert Pitres defended his doctoral thesis in medicine under the supervision of Charcot, which was based on his studies identifying the role of the centrum ovale. After moving to Bordeaux, Pitres continued his collaboration with Charcot on the cerebral localisations, which was the subject of a co-written book in 1883. Pitres' interest in research on cerebral localisations is also manifest in his studies on the topography of the brain lesions implicated in Jacksonian epilepsy.

=== Research on language disorders and memory ===
Albert Pitres is also known for his work on disorders of spoken and written language, and their connection to memory. He conducted studies on amnestic aphasia, aphasia in polyglots, and agraphia. He considered that these studies were to be seen as part of the field of "pathological psychology". For him, memory as a complex psychological function that cannot be localised, so searching for its cortical projections was not relevant: “Cortical sensory centres are not isolated from the rest of the brain and do not function autonomously. Each of them is formed by groups of cells that association neurons equipped with infinitely complex extensions connect to all other parts of the cortex.” Pitres' work on aphasia was the subject of a report at the French Congress of Internal Medicine in Lyon in 1894.

=== Research on other neurological disorders ===
Albert Pitres' studies on peripheral nerve lesions were based on his observations of war injuries suffered by soldiers in the 1870 war and World War I. He described the phantom sensations experienced by amputees, as well as the mechanisms of regeneration and compensation that counteract nerve severance. He also studied peripheral neuritis in diabetes with Louis Vaillard (1850–1935). One of his final books published in 1925 with Léo Testut (1849–1925) (Les nerfs en schémas, anatomie et physiopathologie) was devoted to the anatomy and pathophysiology of the peripheral nerves.

Pitres studied the neurological complications of syphilis, and, together with Jean Abadie, described the lack of sensitivity of the Achilles tendon to pressure exerted on the tabes, known as the "Abadie sign" but also sometimes called the "Pitres sign". Together with his student Jean-René Cruchet (1875–1959), whose thesis he supervised in 1902, he developed a method of respiratory gymnastics (the Brissaud method and the Pitres method) based on a ventilation technique designed to control motor tics, such as those occurring in Tourette's syndrome. Thanks to Pitres' clinical expertise in neurology, patients from all over the world were hospitalized in his department at Saint André Hospital.

Service of Professor Pitres at Hospital Saint André (Bordeaux, 1901)

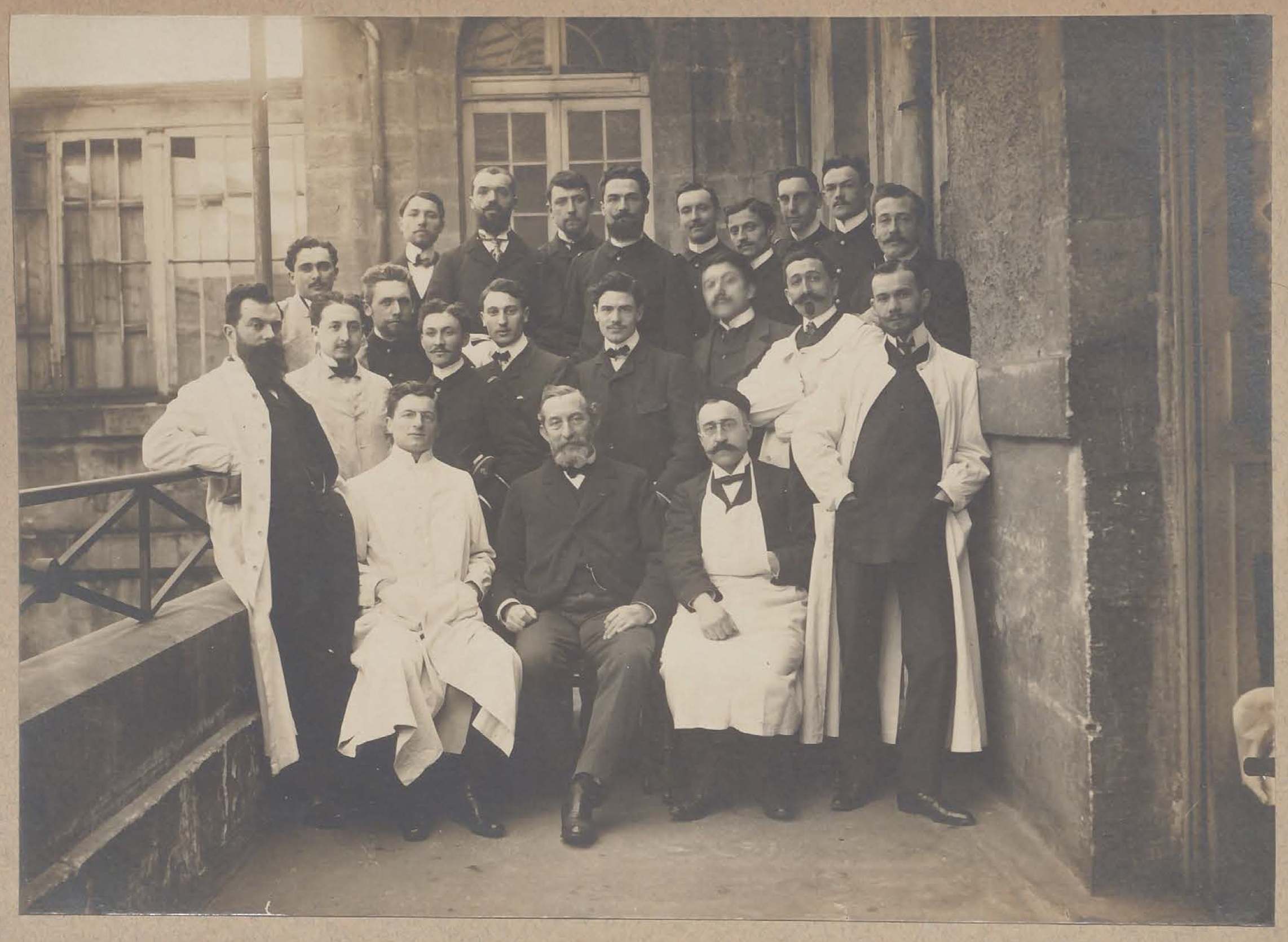
Medical staff of Pitres (middle of front row)

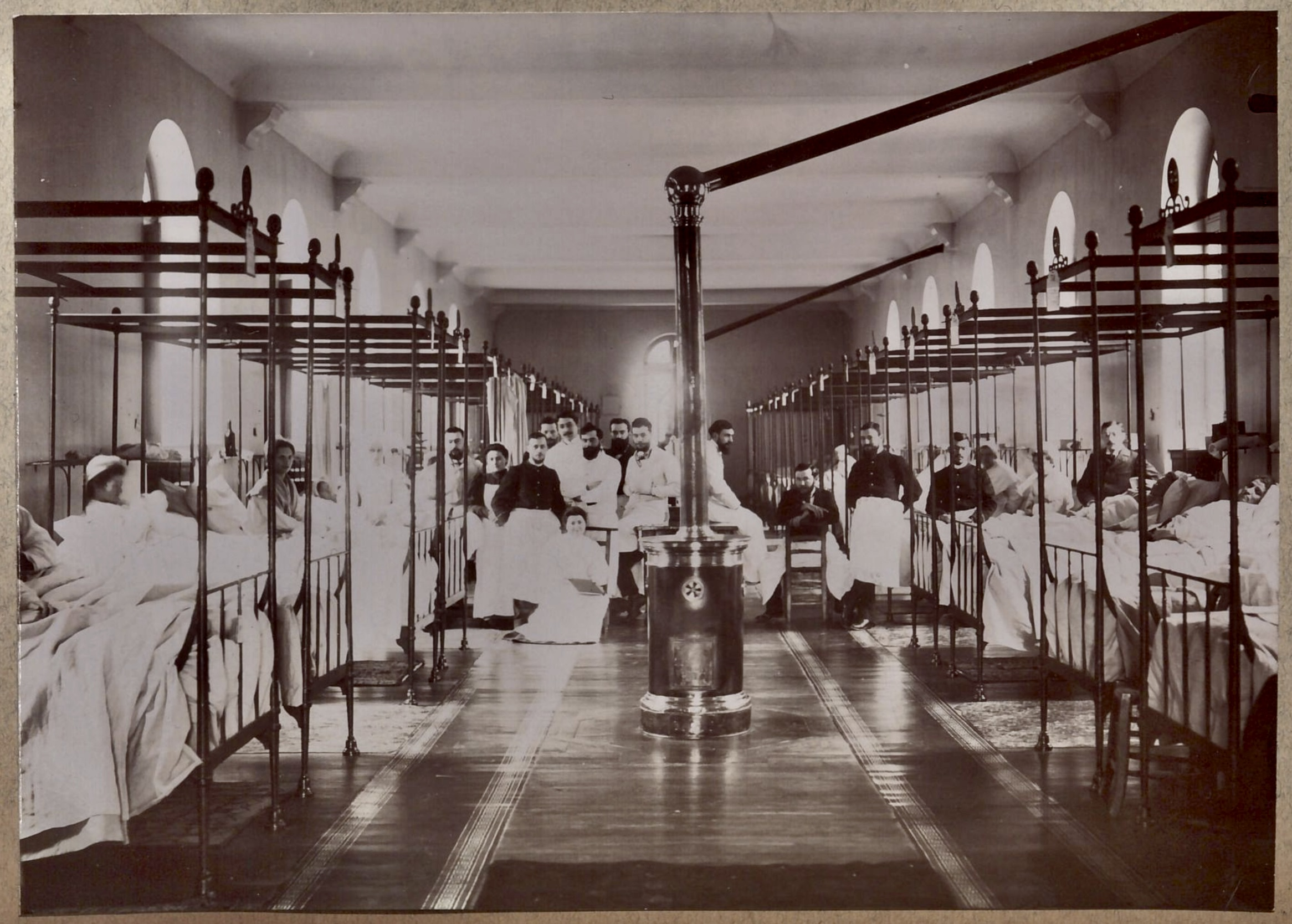
Hospitalisation ward

=== Research on hysteria and other psychiatric disorders ===
Pitres devoted much time to the study of hysteria following his return to Bordeaux, owing to the close relationship he enjoyed with Jean-Martin Charcot at the Hôpital de la Salpêtrière. His famous Clinical Lectures on Hysteria and Hypnotism, delivered as part of the course on internal medicine at Saint André Hospital (1884–1890), were published with a preface by Charcot. In them, he reproduced the staging of "hysterical" patients, as practised at Salpêtrière. Pitres subscribed to Charcot's theory on the heredity of hysterical neurosis and its very early determinism during development: “It is a disease whose development is driven by heredity; it manifests itself from childhood onwards through specific neuropathic episodes, and when it breaks out in youth or adulthood, accompanied by its characteristic symptoms, it is because the patient's organism has long harboured the seed of the disease.” He also followed in Charcot's theory regarding the treatment of hysteria, based on the ovarian theory and the "hysterogenic" and "hysteric-inhibiting zones". He recommended that patients wear “a spring-loaded bandage, similar to hernia bandages, with the pad resting on the inhibitory ovarian region. Equipped with these bandages, patients can go out during the day and go about their usual activities without fear of being unexpectedly seized by attacks.” When Charcot's theory on hypnosis was discredited, and following his death in 1893, Pitres abandoned his work on hysteria overnight.

Owing to his interest in psychiatric disorders, Pitres carried out studies on psychasthenia, and on obsessions and phobias. Pitres and Régis presented a Report on Obsessions and Fixed Ideas at the Moscow Congress in 1897, based on 250 personal observations. In 1902, they published a reference work on the same subject, illustrated with 110 clinical cases. Its title, Obsession and Impulses, was a direct reference to Freud's Obsessions and Phobias, published in 1895. Under the influence of Albert Pitres, and thanks to his interest in psychopathology, numerous theses were defended on this research topic in Bordeaux, according to the testimony of his student Pierre Janet.

Books of Albert Pitres on neurological and psychiatric diseases

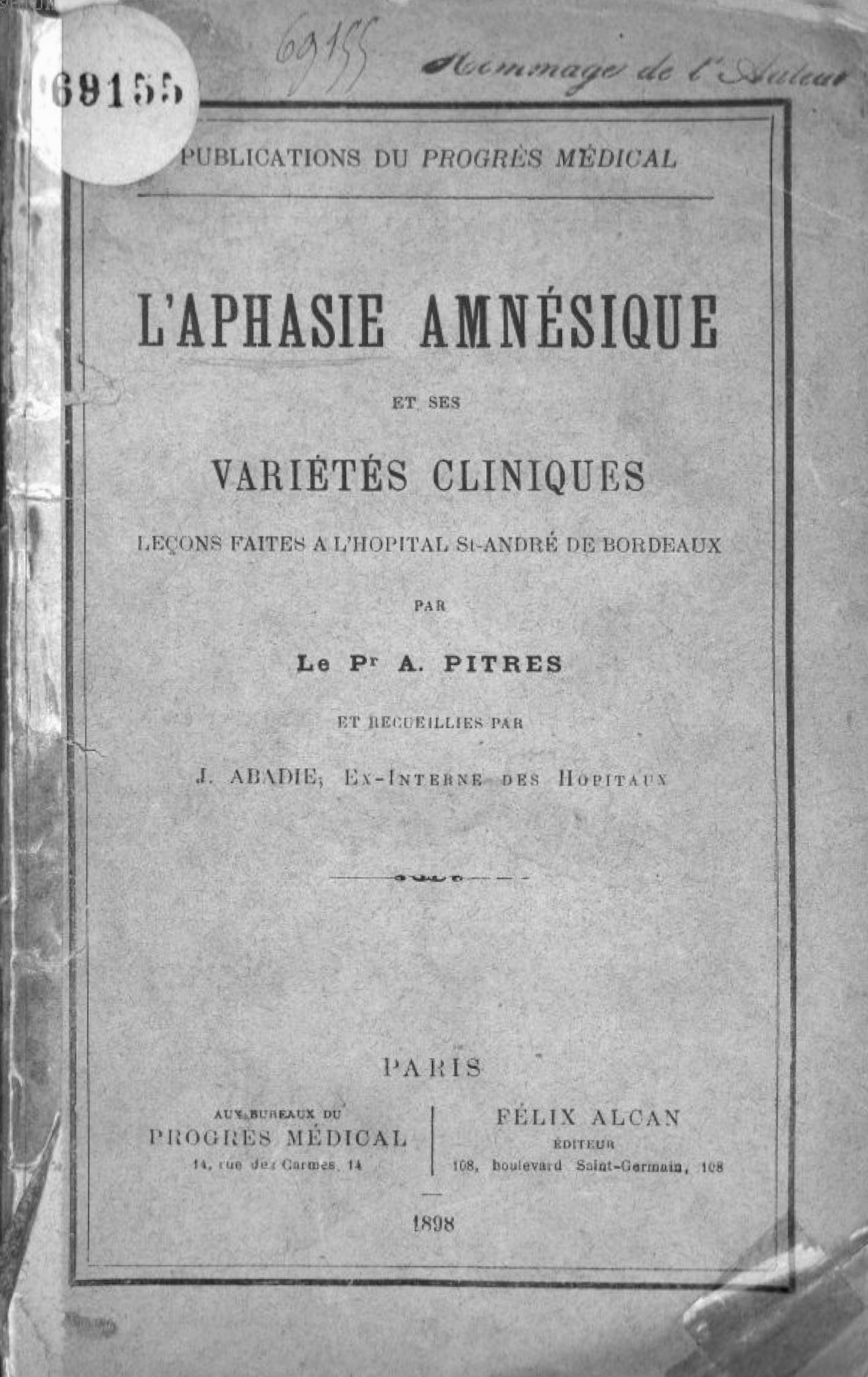

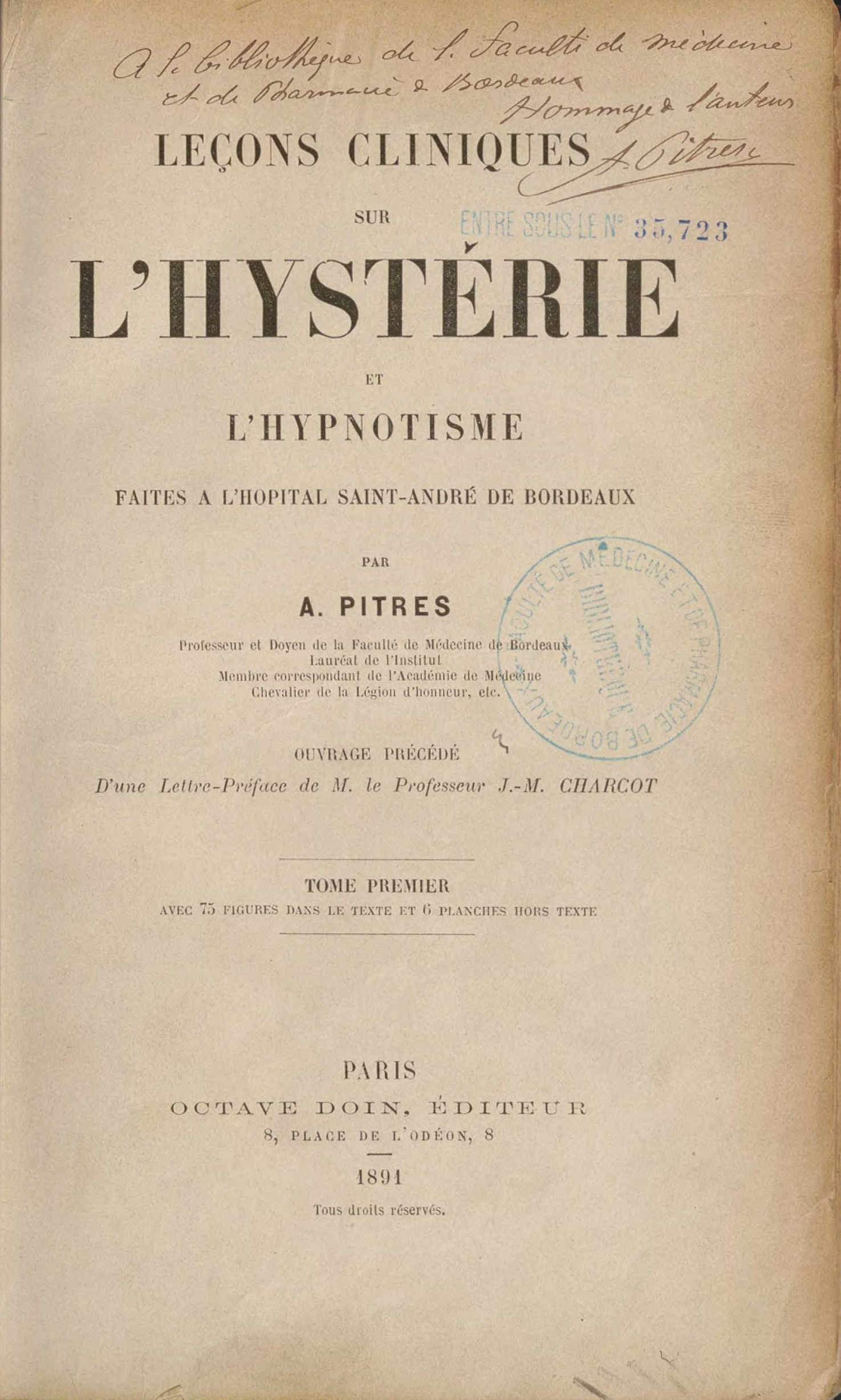

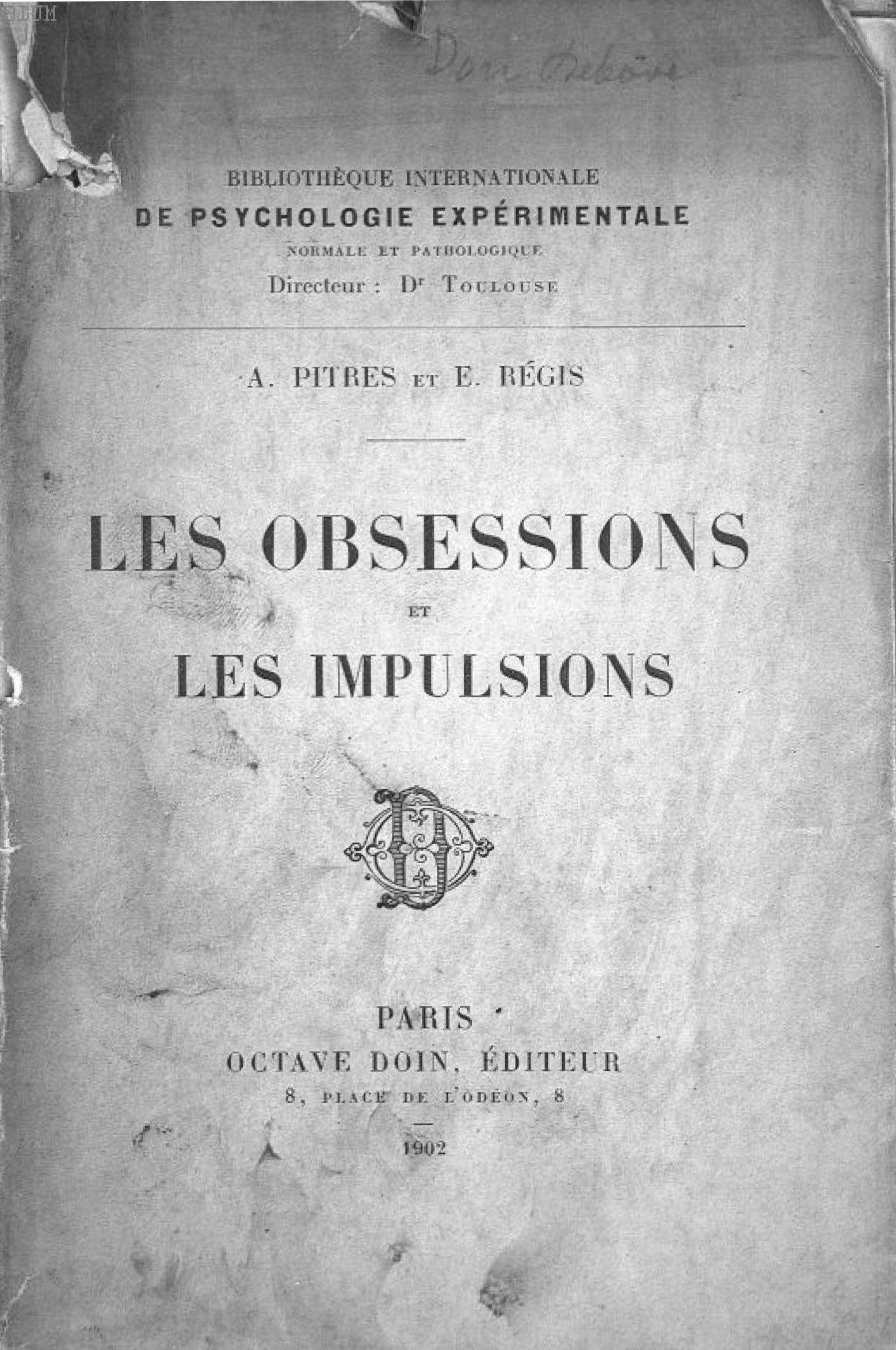

=== Research in pneumology ===
Pitres is best known for his work in neurology and psychiatry, but he was also a specialist of internal medicine renowned for his studies on pleurisy. He studied the semiology of pleurisy and described "Pitres coin sign" enabling the diagnosis of pleural effusion: the sound produced by striking one coin placed on the chest with another coin is altered on auscultation by the presence of fluid.

=== Prevention of epidemics and access to healthcare for the "deprived" ===
Albert Pitres was a pioneer in health care organisation and public health. Shocked upon his arrival in Bordeaux by the lack of organisation in the fight against infectious diseases, he was deeply committed to the prevention of epidemics and access to healthcare for the most deprived members of society. The fight against tuberculosis was fully underway in Bordeaux at that time. Arthur Armaingaud (1842–1935), professor at the Faculty of Medicine of Bordeaux, founded the French Anti-Tuberculosis League in 1892 after a decade of campaigning. Anglade and Cruchet, two students of Pitres, demonstrated that Pflügge droplets (saliva droplets) played a significant role in the human-to-human transmission of tuberculosis.

Pitres did not subscribe to the then-prevailing theory that tuberculosis was inherited and supported the hypothesis of human-to-human transmission, following Koch's work that identified the bacillus of tuberculosis in 1882. In 1903, Pitres was instrumental in the construction of the Foyer Dupreux, the first anti-tuberculosis dispensary in Bordeaux. He studied the transmission of tuberculosis among "deprived" families in the city of Bordeaux, and identified the link between poverty and the risk of infection. Pitres believed that social welfare initiatives promoting hygiene could play a central role in preventing epidemics. He opened a service offering free outpatient consultations for the "deprived" at Saint André Hospital, despite numerous opponents of the project who wanted to maintain fee-based consultations. He also devoted much energy to the eradication of leprosy. He was personally affected by the tuberculosis epidemic, as his second son died from the disease at the age of 26.

=== Development of the Faculty of Medicine and Pharmacy in Bordeaux ===
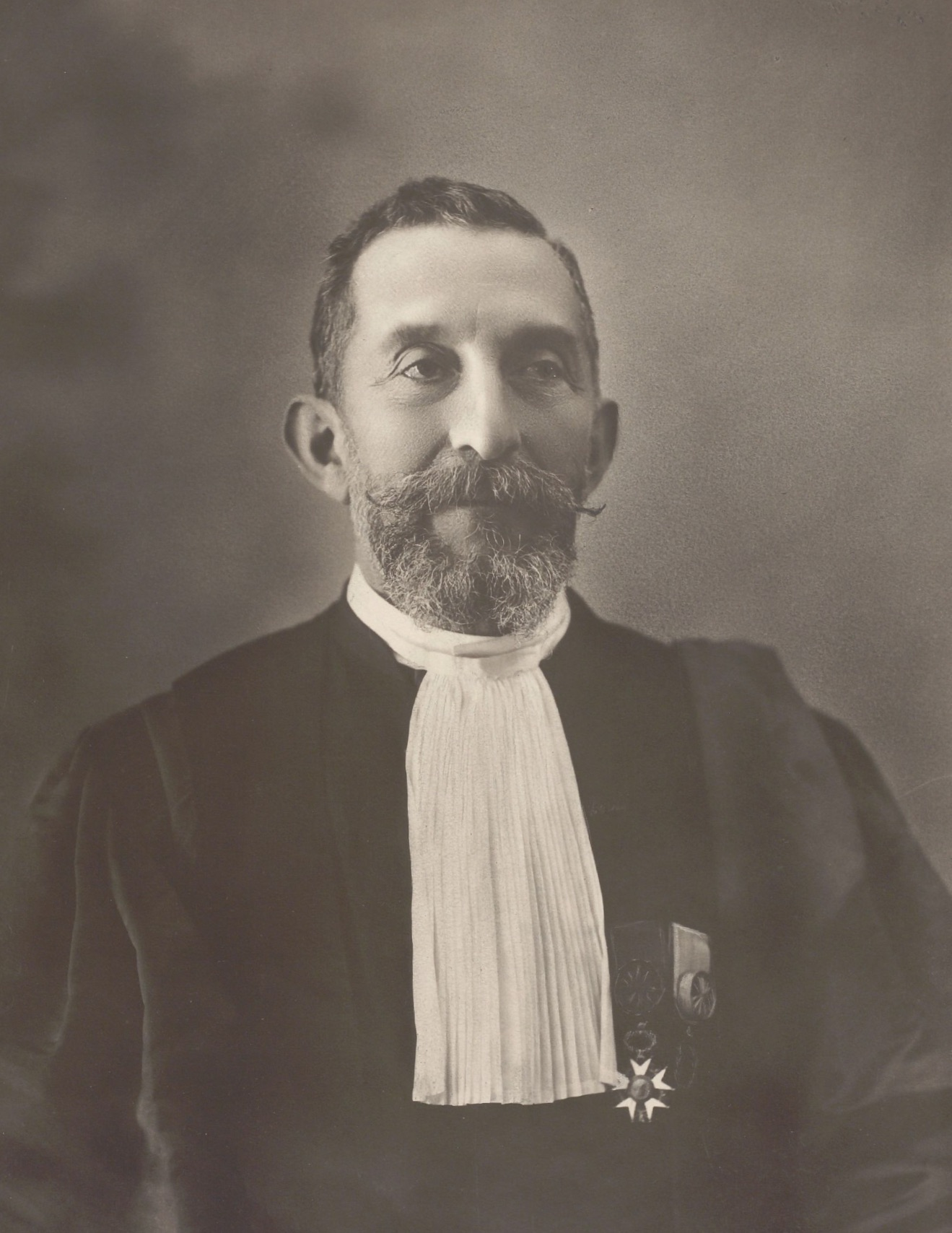
Albert Pitres, dean of the Faculty of Medecine and Pharmacy Bordeaux

In his role as Dean of the Faculty, Albert Pitres followed in the footsteps of his mentor and predecessor, Henri Gintrac, and the latter's father, Élie Gintrac. Pitres continued their work in developing the Faculty of Medicine and Pharmacy in Bordeaux, which was officially established in 1874 and had been open since 1878. The premises of the former Saint Raphaël and Saint Côme schools of medicine and surgery were too cramped to accommodate 83 professors and over a thousand students. Pitres devoted much of his term as dean to persuading the municipal and national authorities to build a university campus for the new faculty. His efforts were rewarded thanks to the decisive intervention of the then President of the Republic, Sadi Carnot. The campus was built at the Place d'Aquitaine (now Place de la Victoire) between Rue Élie Gintrac and Rue Paul Broca. This imposing edifice housed lecture theatres, research laboratories and museums. For Pitres, teaching was inseparable from research: “To rise to the level of the social mission they are called upon to fulfil, the new faculties, whilst remaining vocational schools, must provide higher education in the truest sense of the word. Their professors must not merely be disseminators of knowledge, but also initiators of ideas, distinguishing themselves through original work and discoveries.” The inauguration of the university campus took place on 28 April 1888 in the presence of President Sadi Carnot, numerous ministers, and all the official dignitaries of the city of Bordeaux. A huge public celebration was organised, during which Pitres was appointed Knight of the Légion d'Honneur.

Albert Pitres played a decisive role in the creation in Bordeaux of the medical military school of the Navy, known commonly as Santé Navale. Two other port cities, Marseille and Montpellier, were also candidates to host this school which would enable students to obtain a doctorate in medecine required to practising in the Navy. For Pitres, Santé Navale occupied an important position within Bordeaux's academic landscape, particularly for the teaching of tropical medicine. He created a diploma in "colonial" medicine and opened a museum of ethnography within the faculty. After numerous trips to Paris, he succeeded in 1890 in convincing the national authorities to choose Bordeaux, and to build the school near the new universitary campus. Pitres worked alongside Emmanuel Régis to strengthen the academic ties between the faculty and the medical military school.

Bordeaux Campus of Medicine and Pharmacy inaugurated in 1888

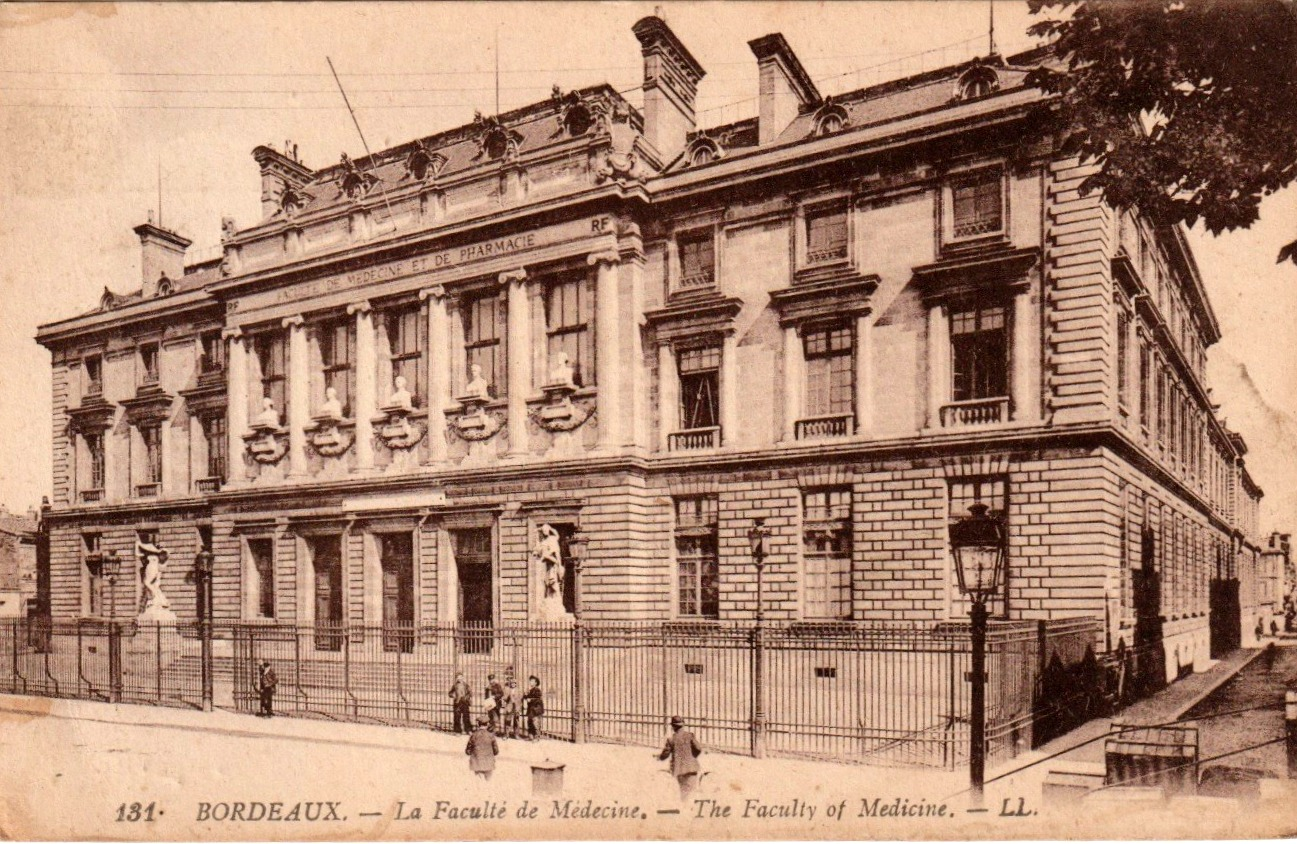
Faculty of Medicine and Pharmacy of Bordeaux

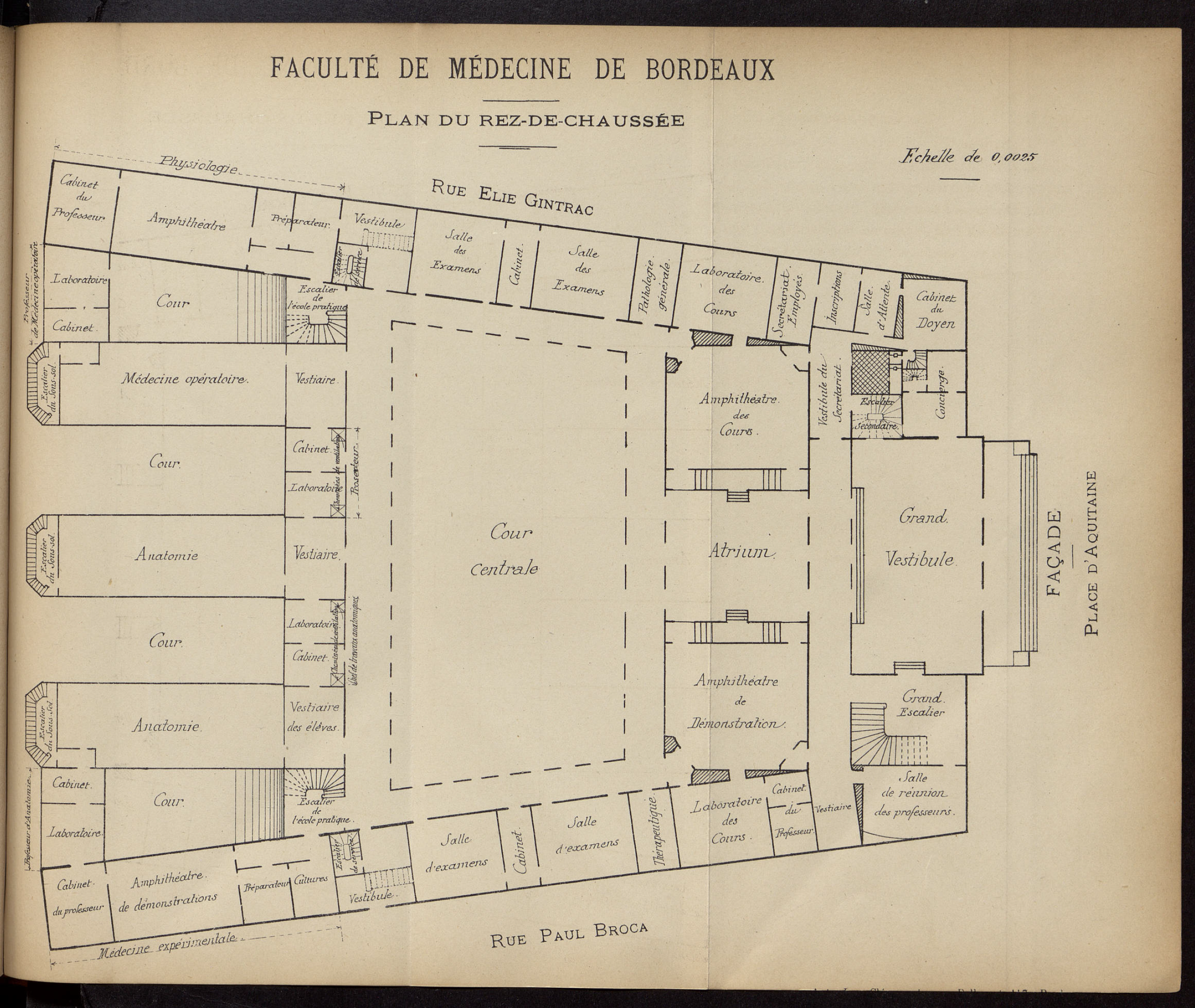
map of faculty ground floor

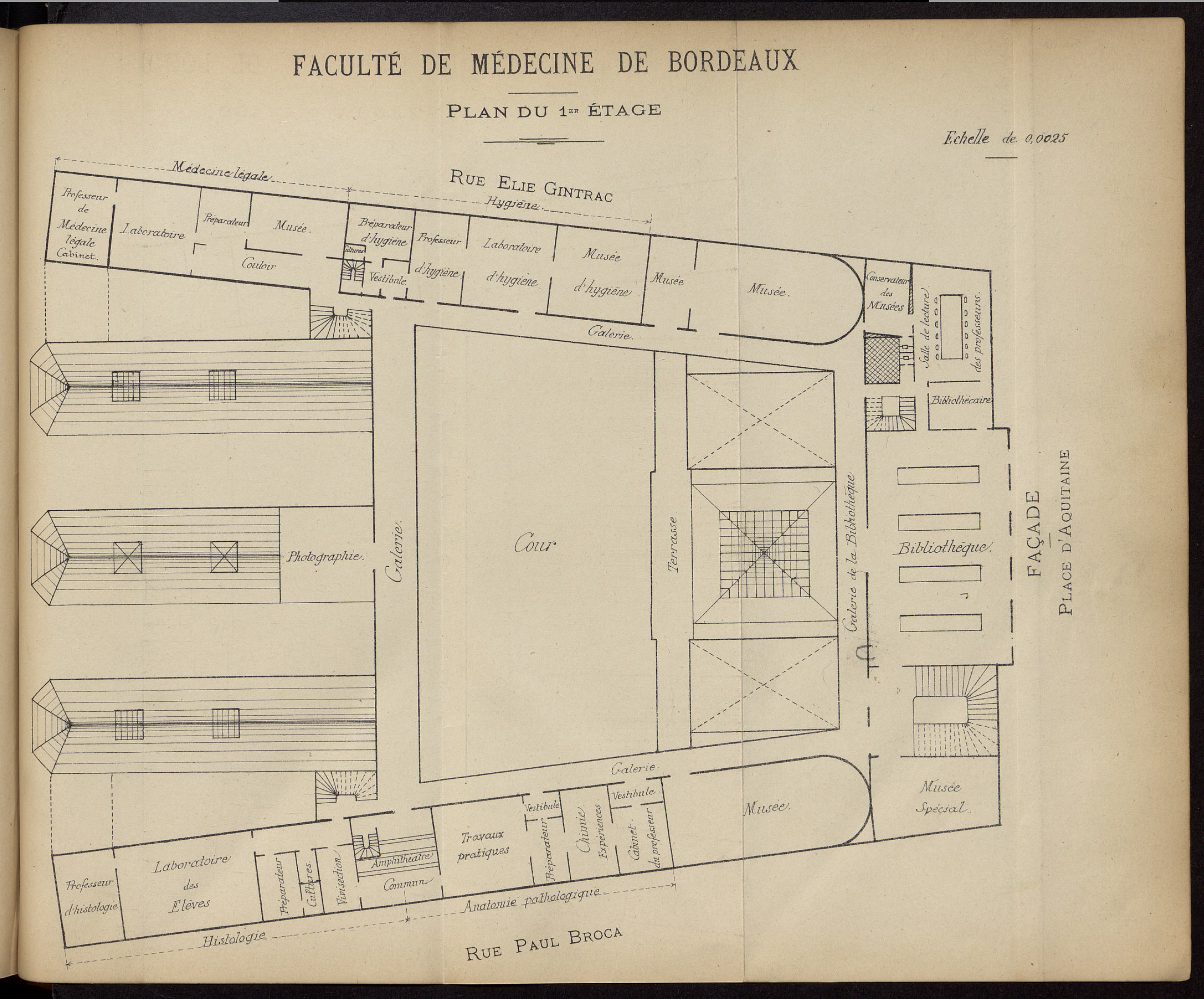
map of faculty 1st floor

During his terms as Dean, Albert Pitres contributed to the creation of Chairs for new medical and surgical specialities: obstetrics and gynaecology, pediatric surgery, ophthalmology, biochemistry and otorhinolaryngology. He was a pioneer in promoting the teaching of psychiatry, first by proposing to Emmanuel Régis in 1887 that he teach mental illnesses in Bordeaux, and then by creating the first provincial Chair of clinical mental health for Régis in 1913. Under Pitres' leadership, the emergence of a Bordeaux-based school of psychiatry with close links to physiology, neurology and internal medicine, would have a major and lasting influence on the development and theoretical research avenues of the Bordeaux School of Neuropsychiatry.

== Tributes ==
- The Pitres Amphitheatre at the Victoire campus of the University of Bordeaux, in the historic premises of the Faculty of Medicine and Pharmacy, which was inaugurated in 1888.
- Street (rue) Albert Pitres in Bordeaux (formerly street Traversière, where Pitres's birthplace is located, renamed in his honour, in the Jardin Public district).
- Lane (allée) Albert Pitres in Lanton (Gironde), where Albert Pitres's house on the Arcachon Bay was located.

== See also ==
- Emmanuel Régis
- Jean-Martin Charcot
- Jean Abadie
- Paul Delmas-Marsalet
- Michel Bénézech
- Marc-Louis Bourgeois
