= Charles-Émile François-Franck =

French physiologist

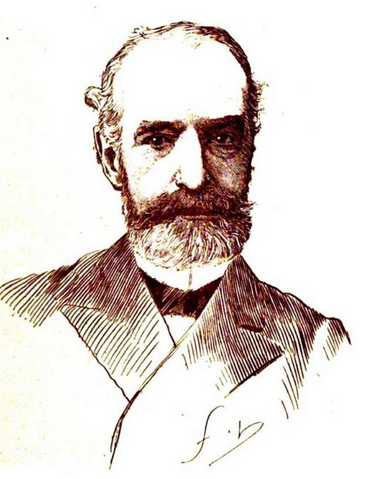
- Born: 7 May 1849; Paris, France
- Died: 8 September 1921 (aged 72); Paris, France
- Awards: Chevalier of the Legion of Honour; Officer of the Legion of Honor

Academic work
- Discipline: physiology
- Institutions: Collège de France
- Main interests: sympathectomy

Charles-Émile François-Franck (7 May 1849, Paris – 8 September 1921, Paris) was a French physiologist.

From 1871 he served as a hospital intern in Bordeaux, later returning to Paris, where he worked as an assistant to Étienne-Jules Marey in the laboratory of pathophysiology at the Collège de France. In 1885 he was named director of the laboratory, and in 1890, attained the title of professor. Among his assistants at the Collège de France was neuropathologist Gustave Roussy. In 1887 he was elected as a member of the Académie Nationale de Médecine.

His research included studies of vasomotor regulation, pulmonary blood flow and investigations involving the cerebral localization of function. He was a pioneer of sympathectomy (interruption of the sympathetic nervous system for relieving pain) and remembered for his usage of cinematography to accurately record body movements.

== Selected works ==
- Recherches sur l'anatomie et la physiologie des nerfs vasculaires de la tête, 1875 – Research on the anatomy and physiology of the vascular nerves of the head.
- Leçons sur les fonctions motrices du cerveau (réactions volontaires et organiques) et sur l'épilepsie cérébrale (preface by Jean-Martin Charcot), 1887 – Lessons on the motor function of the brain (voluntary and organic reactions) and on cerebral epilepsy.
- Fonctions réflexes des ganglions du grand sympathique, 1894 – Reflex functions of the sympathetic ganglia.
- Nouvelles recherches sur l'action vaso-constrictive pulmonaire du grand sympathique, 1895 – New research on pulmonary vaso-constrictive action, etc.
- Cours du Collège de France de 1880 à 1904 (Courses taught at the Collège de France from 1880 to 1904).
- L'oeuvre de E.-J. Marey: membre de l'Institut et de l'Académie de Médecine, etc., 1905 – Works of Étienne-Jules Marey.
