= Benjamin Ball (physician) =

French psychiatrist

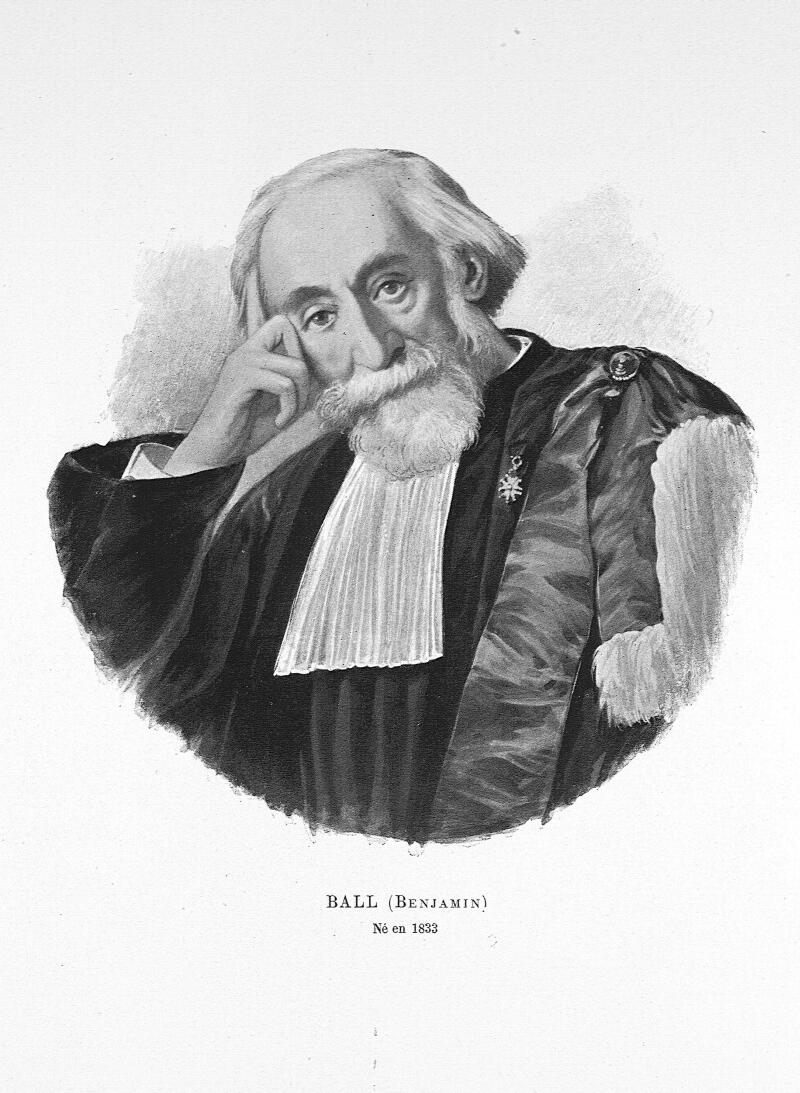
- Born: 20 April 1833; Naples, Kingdom of the Two Sicilies
- Died: 23 February 1893 (aged 59); Paris, France
- Occupation: Psychiatrist
- Spouse: Suzanne Carrier de Belleuse
- Medical career
- Profession: Medicine
- Awards: Legion of Honour – Knight (1880)

Benjamin Ball (20 April 1833 – 23 February 1893) was a French psychiatrist who was born in the Kingdom of the Two Sicilies. He was the first "Chair of Mental and Brain Diseases" at the Paris Faculty of Medicine.

== Early life ==
He was born at Naples, to an English father, William Ball, and a Swiss mother, Julie Autran (1807–1852). He was naturalised as French in 1849 and spent the whole of his professional life in Paris.

== Medical career ==
He studied medicine under Jacques-Joseph Moreau de Tours and Jean-Martin Charcot and was an assistant of Charles Lasègue at the Salpêtrière Hospital. During his internat he was Laureate of the Academy of Medicine (Prix Portal, in collaboration with Charcot). He became doctor of medicine in 1862.

With the support of Jean-Martin Charcot, Ball became to first Chair of Mental and Brain Diseases (Clinique des Maladies Mentales et de l’Encéphale) in the Paris Faculty of Medicine in 18 April 1877, to the detriment of his rival Valentin Magnan.

In 1881, in collaboration with Jules Bernard Luys, Ball founded the journal L'Encéphale, which the pair directed until 1889.

== Alienist work ==
Ball advocated against psychic disorders being separated from the rest of medicine, stating that "the work of the mind coincides with phenomena of a purely physical".

== Written works ==
Ball is the author of numerous works relating to mental diseases. In 1885, he published a trail-blazing treatrise entitled La morphinomanie, in which he evidenced the toxic effects of cocaine which were not absolutely acknowledged at the time.

title	translation	published
Des Embolies pulmonaires	Pulmonary Embolism	Paris 1862
Du rhumatisme viscéral	Visceral rheumatism	Paris 1866
La médecine mentale à travers les siècles	Mental medicine through the centuries	Paris 1879
De certains cas d’ischémie fonctionnelle du cerveau	Certain cases of functional ischemia of the brain.	Paris 1880
Considérations sur l’ischémie cérébrale fonctionnelle.	Considerations on functional cerebral ischemia.	Paris 1881
Des impulsions intellectuelles	Mental medicine through the centuries	Paris 1881
De la folie religieuse.	On Religious Madness.	Paris 1882
La médecine mentale à travers les siècles	Insanity in Agitating Paralysis.	Paris 1882
La morphinomanie	On morphinomania	1st edition: Paris 1885; 2nd edition: Paris 1888
La folie érotique	On erotic insanity	1st edition: Paris 1888; 2nd edition: Paris 1893
Du délire des persécutions, ou Maladie de Lasègue	On persecution deliria	Paris 1890
Leçons sur les maladies mentales	Lessons on Mental Illnesses	1st edition: Paris 1880; 2nd edition: Paris 1890

== Awards ==
By decree on 14 July 1880 (declaration: 29 January 1881) Ball was awarded a Knight in France's Legion of Honour.

== Personal life ==
On 2 August 1871, Ball married Suzanne Carrier de Belleuse (1847–1928). They had six children, including Albert Ball (1875–1937).

== Death ==
Ball suffered from ill health for 12 months that prevented him from working as a physician. Ball, who is suspected of having endured a two-year evolution of a cancer, died at his Paris residence on 23 February 1893. In his obituary, he was described as having died of "severe mental strain" due to his illness. His wife's brother and sculptor, Robert Carrier de Belleuse (1848–1913), made a bronze bust that adorns Ball's tomb in Montmartre Cemetery. In 1898, Albert Ball was admitted to boarding school after the death of his father.

== See also ==
- Legion of Honour
- Legion of Honour Museum
- List of Legion of Honour recipients by name (B)
- List of foreign recipients of Legion of Honour by name
- List of foreign recipients of the Legion of Honour by country
- List of foreign recipients of the Legion of Honour by decade
