= Jules Bernard Luys =

French neurologist (1828–1897)

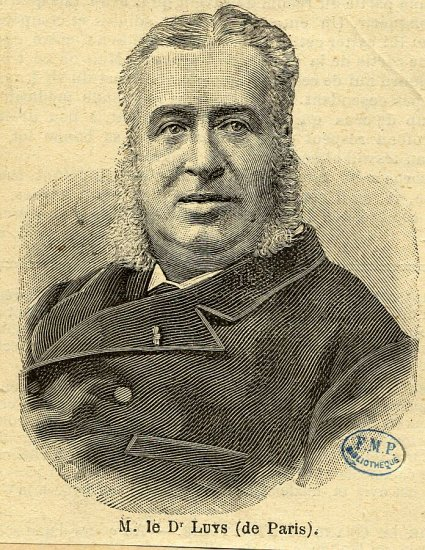
Jules Bernard Luys

Jules Bernard Luys (17 August 1828 – 21 August 1897) was a French neurologist known for significant contributions to nineteenth-century neuroanatomy and neuropsychiatry. He produced influential works on the structure and function of the central nervous system and published the first photographic atlas of the human brain.

== Early life and education ==
Luys was born in Paris on 17 August 1828. He earned his medical degree in 1857 and began conducting extensive research on the anatomy, pathology, and functions of the central nervous system.

== Scientific Career ==
=== Neuroanatomical Research ===
In 1865, Luys published Recherches sur le système cérébro-spinal, sa structure, ses fonctions et ses maladies (“Studies on the Structure, Functions and Diseases of the Cerebro-spinal System”). This treatise included a hand-drawn three-dimensional atlas of the brain and contained the first description of the structure now known as the subthalamic nucleus. Luys called this region the bandelette accessoire des olives supérieures (“accessory band of the superior olives”).

He identified projections from the subthalamic nucleus to the globus pallidus and described connections between the cerebral cortex and the subthalamic region. These pathways later became central to understanding the pathophysiology of Parkinson’s disease, in which the subthalamic nucleus is now a major target for deep brain stimulation.

In recognition of Luys’s contribution, Auguste Forel named the structure corpus Luysii (“Luys’ body”), a term that is still occasionally used.

=== Photographic Brain Atlas ===
In 1873, Luys published Iconographie Photographique des Centres Nerveux, the first photographic atlas of the brain and nervous system. The atlas contained seventy albumen prints showing frontal, sagittal, and horizontal sections. Some images were enlarged using a microscope, while most depicted gross neuroanatomy.

Although photography was growing in popularity as a scientific tool, the Iconographie did not immediately lead to a proliferation of neuroanatomical photographic atlases. A later example was Edward Flatau’s 1894 atlas.

=== Editorial and Collaborative Work ===
In 1881, Luys co-founded the journal L'Encéphale with his colleague and friend Benjamin Ball.

=== Publications ===
- Recherches sur le système cérébro-spinal, sa structure, ses fonctions et ses maladies (1865)
- Iconographie Photographique des Centres Nerveux (1873)
- “The Latest Discoveries in Hypnotism” (Fortnightly Review, 1890)

=== Legacy ===
Luys’s anatomical descriptions continue to influence modern neuroscience, particularly research on the basal ganglia and Parkinson’s disease. His photographic atlas represents an early attempt to integrate emerging imaging technologies into neuroanatomical documentation.
