= Angelo Hesnard =

Angelo Louis Marie Hesnard (or Angel Marie Louis Hesnard; 22 May 1886, Pontivy – 17 April 1969, Rochefort) was a French born psychiatrist and psychoanalyst, and was an important figure in 1930s French sexology.

== Life and career ==
Coming from an impoverished background, Hesnard educated himself through the French navy; and it was a naval doctor that he co-authored the first book on Freud in French in 1914. Despite never being analysed, Hesnard was a founding member of the Paris Psychoanalytic Society, the first French psychoanalytics institution. Loyal to Vichy France in the war, Hesnard continued to serve in the navy, and was in French North Africa when he wrote his notorious article of 'The Jewishness of Sigmund Freud'/

In the fifties he debated with Jacques Lacan over the meaning of Freud's saying "Where It was, shall I be"; but when debarred by the IPA from the roster of training analysts as a representative of the chauvinist wing of French psychoanalysis, he followed Lacan into the École Freudienne de Paris in 1964

== Works ==
- L'univers morbide de la faute, 1949
- Psychanalyse du lien interhumain, 1957
- L'oeuvre de Freud et son importance pour le monde moderne 1960
- Psychologie du crime, 1963
- De Freud à Lacan, 1970
- Works by Angelo Hesnardorganize | filterStrange Lust : The Psychology of Homosexuality, La psicoanalisi da Freud a Lacan, Psychologie homosexuell

== See also ==
- Henri Claude
- Henri Ey
- Rene Laforgue
