= Vascular nerves =

Nerves in the cardiovascular system

Details

Identifiers
- Latin: nervi vasorum or nervi vascularorum
- TA98: A14.2.00.045
- FMA: 75449

Vascular nerves (nervi vasorum) are nerves which innervate arteries and veins. The vascular nerves control vasodilation and vasoconstriction, which in turn lead to the control and regulation of temperature and homeostasis.

Vasodilator innervation is restricted to the following sites:

- The vessels of the skeletal muscle are dilated by cholinergic sympathetic nerves
- The vessels of the exocrine gland are dilated on parasympathetic stimulation
- The cutaneous vessels are dilated locally to produce the flare after an injury. The vasodilation is produced by the afferent impulses in the cutaneous nerves which pass antidromically in their collaterals to their blood vessels (axon reflex)
