= Charles Lasègue =

French physician (1816–1883)

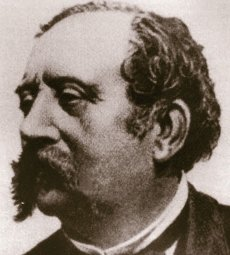
- Born: 5 September 1816; Paris, France
- Died: 20 April 1883 (aged 66); Paris, France
- Known for: Lasègue's sign, Lasègue-Falret syndrome
- Scientific career
- Workplaces: Prefecture de Police; Pitié-Salpêtrière Hospital; Hôpital Necker
- Notable students: Charles Baudelaire

Ernest-Charles Lasègue (5 September 1816 – 20 March 1883) was a French medical doctor who released over one hundred scientific papers. He became recognized in the mid-19th century from his work in the fields of psychiatry and neurology. He published many of his works in a journal called Archives Générales de Médecine (Archives of General Medicine), in which he was an editor. A few of his major contributions consisted of his work with delusions of persecutions, a concept coined "folie à deux," and his description of hysterical anorexia. Aside from his publications, he worked various jobs before becoming the Chair of Clinical Medicine at Pitié-Salpêtrière Hospital. He remained positioned there until dying at the age of 66 due to complications from diabetes.

== Biography ==
=== Early life ===
Ernest-Charles Lasègue was born on 5 September 1816, in Paris, France. His father, Antoine Lasègue, was a librarian and botanist. Recognizing his son's potential at an early age, he enrolled him at the Lycée Louis-le-Grand in Paris where Lasègue quickly distinguished himself among his peers. He spoke fluent Latin, showed a great comprehension of the Greek language, and excelled in philosophy and rhetoric.

=== Education ===
In 1838, Lasègue was offered a teaching position at the lycée by Victor Cousin, his philosophy teacher, which he accepted at the age of 22. Lasègue met and became good friends with physiologist Claude Bernard and psychiatrist Bénédict Morel. Interns at the time, both Bernard and Morel worked under the supervision of Jean-Pierre Falret at the Pitié-Salpêtrière Hospital. Influenced by his friends and Falret, Lasègue enrolled in the Faculté de Médecine at the University of Paris in 1839 but it wasn't until he attended a lecture from Armand Trousseau at the Hôpital Necker that he decided to abandon his studies in philosophy and pursue an education in medicine with a particular interest in psychiatry. Lasègue became a favorite pupil of Trousseau, as well as a dear friend, and went on to collaborate with him on multiple publications. He received his doctoral degree in 1847. That summer, he was summoned by the French government and sent to Southern Russia to study and research the cholera epidemic.

=== Occupations ===
Lasègue became fascinated with medicine, especially psychiatry. His period of time at the Prefecture de Police working as a physician consultant further fostered that interest. During this line of work, he was responsible for analyzing people who committed crimes. Lasègue wrote articles about abnormal behaviour when common patterns were found in the standardized notes he would take of his cases.

Lasègue was also a physician at Pitié-Salpêtrière Hospital and Hôtel Necker and was employed as Trousseau's Chef de Clinique from 1852 to 1854. In 1853, he obtained his agrégation with his thesis "De la paralysie générale progressive." That same year, he became editor of the Archives générales de Médicine. He gave multiple lectures on mental and nervous diseases throughout the 1860s and became professor of clinical medicine at the Hôtel Necker in 1867. In 1869 at the Pitié-Salpêtrière Hospital, he became the chair of clinical medicine. Shortly afterwards, he was elected member of the Académie Nationale de Médecine. He died on 20 March 1883 from complications relating to diabetes at the age of 66.

== Contributions in medicine and psychiatry ==
=== General paralysis and thesis of aggregation ===
In the year 1846, Lasègue graduated from medicine and completed his thesis on vitalistic doctrine from the work done by George Stahl. Following this in 1853, he obtained his professorship and put forth his work on progressive generalized paralysis. Almost a decade later, he educated patients at Salpetriere about neurological and mental diseases through the course he taught. He also received another professorship in the 1860s, this time for General Pathology. Due to his work on general paralysis, Lasègue was able to point out how varying determinants can manifest as the same symptom regardless being caused by brain disorders. This work was later published by Falret.

=== Delusions of persecution (aka "Lasegue Disease") ===
In his 1852 publication "Delire de Persecutions", Lasègue was the first to introduce the idea that typical persecutory delusions were a disorder of its own. He disagreed with both the view of new wave neurologists and old school theorists; he divided persecutory delusions into two categories: general and partial, and argued that further divisions were not unnecessary. He theorized that symptoms were not seen in people under the age of 28 and were more common in women. Additionally, he proposed that the cause of delusions was independent of socioeconomic status, intelligence, and mood. Contrary to popular belief at the time, he believed that auditory hallucinations were not necessarily the cause or effect of persecutory delusions.

=== Earliest accounts of anorexia nervosa ===
Lasègue undertook many clinical observations therefore was one of the first to cultivate objective psychology. He firmly believed that in order to determine the cause of mental illnesses, it is crucial that a patient's history is recorded in detail. This is why he clearly established the roles of psychiatry and physiology as being complementary. Lasègue took a great interest in psychosomatic disorders. In his classic paper "De l’Anorexie Hystérique" written in 1873, he described hysterical anorexia. Even though a description of a condition similar to anorexia called hysterical apepsia was published by a British physician named William Gull 5 years prior, their descriptions differed. This is because Lasègue focused on aspects revolving around psychological systems, such as the role of family interactions and parental attitudes. Despite this however, both Lasègue and Gull did not acknowledge the fear people have of weight gain and their overall body image which is actually classified as one of the diagnostic criteria today for anorexia nervosa. Again, Lasègue provided more description in his work as he gathered information from eight cases and concluded that this mental illness involved gradually decreasing the amount of food consumed and also becoming more strict with food preferences.

=== Concept of "folie à deux" ===
In their 1877 publication "La folie a deux (ou folie communiquee)", Lasègue alongside Falret were the first to introduce a term called Lasègue–Falret syndrome or "folie a deux", which translated to "insanity of two". They described a shared psychological disorder in which delusional symptoms are transferred from one psychotic individual to one or multiple closely associated healthy individuals. Lasegue and Falret acknowledged that typical psychotic behaviour was not contagious. Therefore, they took an interest in the role of interpersonal communication in transferring psychosis. In their paper, they described communication between three pairs of closely associated individuals. The direction of communication was from: an adult to a child, an adult to an elderly individual, and an elderly individual to an adult. They theorized that the pairs' proximity of contact, duration of contact, and imbalance in intellect and suggestibility (the child being less intelligent and more gullible) allowed the syndrome to manifest. They also suggested that transference was more common among women who were living in confinement. Their paper was only translated to English in 1964, despite being referenced several times. However, their coined term "folie a deux" is still commonly used internationally amongst the psychiatric vocabulary today.

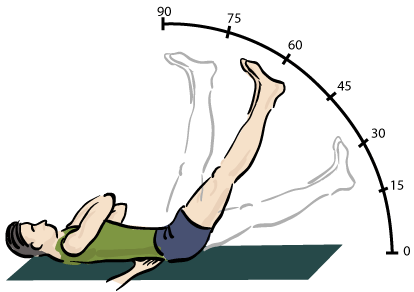
The Lasègue's sign, also known as the straight leg raise, is a test used in the physical examination of patients with low back pain to determine the presence of sciatic pain.

=== Lasègue’s sign' ===
One of Lasègue's most well known contributions to neurology was termed "Lasègue's sign" otherwise known as "Lasègue’s test." In his publication he introduced effects that manifest from stretching the sciatic nerve by flexing the hip and extending the leg. In the field of clinical practice, it became the standard test. He actually stated in his 1864 paper that the level of pain will not increase from passively extending or flexing the leg. This means it was most likely that he had not tried it with the combination flexing the hip at the time. However, Lasègue noted that he could tell malingerers apart from patients experiencing real sciatic pain by just conducting the leg raise test. Although Lasègue was the one to emphasize its presence in sciatica and the importance it held for diagnostics, it was his student named Forst in 1881 who first described the sign.

=== Described exhibitionism ===
In 1877, Lasègue described the phenomenon of exhibitionism. Shortly after this, the term started to appear in literature with no significant changes being made of the description to date. Lasègue believed that the behaviour of an exhibitionist was only typical of males, and was marked by an intense urge to display their genitals. Although Lasègue described this phenomenon as impulsive, acts of this display typically seemed to occur at the same areas with the same victims

=== Study on alcoholism ===
Lasègue was recognized as one of the most prominent French specialists in alcoholism. His daily work routine consisted of a great number of alcoholic patients whom he studied and accessed in police hospitals. He conducted research on intoxicated patients and the sufferers' obsessions. His study on alcoholism lead him to the belief that alcoholic disorder, is in fact, a mental disorder. However, Lasègue had several critics to his theory, as they argued that alcoholic delirium was "a vague concept that it filled asylums with people who were neither true alcoholics or true lunatics." At last, doctors needed to revise and re-examine the classification and description of alcoholism, as it didn't fit the concept that all alcoholics are mentally ill.

=== Scurvy ===
Lasègue described the conditions people faced in the scurvy epidemic from extreme food shortages in his publication. He accurately described the symptoms of scurvy while really focusing on the impact that the cold and nutritional deficits had. He believed these to be key factors, especially for the group of German prisoners at the Hôpital de la Pitié he cared for. Lasègue, alongside another physician named Alexis Charles Legroux, went on to establish a correlation between cases of scurvy in German prisons and the lack of physical activity relative to the duration of enclosure.

== Publications ==
Ernest-Charles Laségue had "published about 115 scientific papers on different medical topics in the areas of neurology, psychiatry, internal medicine, pediatrics, and the history of medicine." His most prominent publications include:

- Archives Générales de Médecine (Archives of General Medicine), 1823- issued majority of his papers here.
- De l’Anorexie Hystérique (Hysterical Anorexia), 1873- Laségue speaks about Hysterical Anorexia and the psychological aspect of the disorder.
- La folie a deux, 1877 (accompanied by Jules Falret)- introduced the Laségue-Falret Syndrome, a psychological disorder and spoke in-depth about the disorder.
- Les Cérébraux, 1880- Laségue addresses the significance of psychosomatic medicine associated with medicine overall.
- Questions de therapeutique mentale, 1884- Laségue examines delusional ideas.
