= Anwar Jamal =

Indian documentary filmmaker

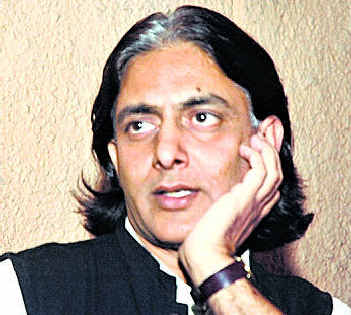
- Born: 15 August 1961 (age 65); Bareilly, Uttar Pradesh, India
- Education: Jamia Millia Islamia
- Occupations: Filmmaker, author

Anwar Jamal (born 15 August 1961) is an Indian documentary filmmaker, based in New Delhi. He has been awarded the National Film Award on several occasions and had made critically acclaimed feature, short and documentary films a wide array of social, political and cultural themes. He has served as jury in many international film festivals including National Film Award Jury.

He is most noted for his feature film, Swaraaj – The Little Republic (2002), which he also wrote, produced and directed, on the theme of women's empowerment and the politics of water in rural India.

== Early life and education ==
Anwar grew up in Bareilly, western Uttar Pradesh. He came to Delhi to pursue his interests in arts, literature, theatre, and later cinema. While supporting himself for his Masters in Hindi literature through freelance journalism, he got actively involved with amateur theatre.

He joined the AJK, Mass Communication Research Centre at Jamia Millia Islamia, on the invitation of its founder Chairperson, the late AJ Kidwai, and came close to the world-renowned documentary filmmaker James Beveridge.

== Career ==
While studying, he assisted Anand Patwardhan, a well-known documentary filmmaker on three films, In Memory of Friends, In the Name of God, and Father, Son and Holy War. Thereafter he made his first independent documentary film, My Name is Sister, on nurses in Delhi.

His first few short films, made along with Sehjo Singh, were made for Doordarshan (National Television) on the subject of the Deorala Sati incident and the phenomenon of child marriages. Anwar made his first independent documentary on the question of development and big dams, The Call of Bhagirathi. This documentary featured in the Indian Panorama, and won the National Film Award for Best Investigative Film in 1992.

He has also won two more National Awards for co-producing documentaries on the issue of land rights, directed by Sehjo Singh. Anwar also directed Zinda Itihaas, a serial on living cultural legends like B.C. Sanyal, Zohra Sehgal and Fida Husain Narsi for Doordarshan. He made a short film, 'of life and love', for permanent display at the International Museum of Red Cross and Red Crescent in Geneva, Switzerland.

He worked as the India director (with Sehjo Singh) for Orcades, a series of socio-political stories on French Television in 1989. Mad Mundo, a web-based television series, supported by Arte, on the subject of migration of IT professionals in June 2000 and an hour-long documentary on Indian call centres, made for the Australian Broadcasting Corporation. He has also worked with ARD South Asia wing of German Television on Indian news stories.

In 2002, he made a feature film on the experiences of women in grassroots democratic institutions, titled Swaraaj (The Little Republic), produced by the Institute of Social Sciences. This film was selected for the Indian Panorama at the International Film Festival of India in 2002. It premiered at the World Film Festival in Montreal and travelled to numerous major festivals around the world.

He served as a National Film Awards Jury member in 2004 and as an International Jury member for competition films in the Tallinn Black Nights Film Festival, Tallinn, Estonia in December 2004, and in the 9th Dhaka International Film Festival in January 2006. More recently, he directed an acclaimed series of short fiction films titled Vanishing Daughters, Uska Aana and Teesra Raasta. He also co-edited a bilingual compilation of essays, Hollywood Bollywood: The Politics of Crossover Films, published by Vani Prakashan.

Anwar's served as Executive Producer of Sikandar (2009), a Hindi feature film produced by the Big Pictures. The film was shot almost entirely in Kashmir. In 2008, he made the independent documentary, Anwar – Dream of a Dark Night on a fellowship From Prasar Bharati and Public Service Broadcasting Trust. He followed that up in 2009 with Harvest of Grief, an investigative film about of the

agrarian crisis in Punjab and its impact on agricultural families. It was produced by the NGO Ekatra. Jamal received the I&B ministry's Visioning India Public Service Broadcasting Trust 2010 fellowship to make a documentary film on the life and culture of Old Delhi. The film, titled 'Dil Ki Basti Mein, He recently completed a series of 10 short films promoting heritage conservation for the National Mission on Monuments and Antiquities.

Anwar's feature-length fiction film as director is currently in development. Anwar's work has been screened in more than 200 film festivals around the world. In 2010, he served on the feature film jury of the Roshd International Film Festival in Iran, and at Abu Dhabi Film Festival in 2011.

In 2012-2013, Anwar Jamal was the Director of City Pulse Institute of Film & Television, Gandhinagar, where he made 40 short films and documentaries with students.

From 2013 to 2014 he was an adviser to the Doordarshan Directorate-General for the national broadcaster's DD Urdu. During his tenure he handled the commissioning and quality control of 3000 hours of programming.

He is a member of the English books selection committee of Raja Rammohun Roy Library Foundation Kolkata.

Directed 52 episodes of Documentaries series titled Kisano Ke Mahanayak for DD Kisan during the years 2016-17, focusing on farmers' stories.

Directed a documentary film Empire of Threads in association with Public Service Broadcasting Trust and Prasar Bharati in 2016-17.

Directed 78 episodes of fiction based on Matrei Pushpa novel IDANNMAM in the series Manda Har Yug Mein for DD Kisan channel in 2016-17.

Nominated as a Jury in 7th National Science Film Festival and Competition 2017. also Chairman of the international jury for KWFF (Kashmir World Film Festival 2017) and board member.

As a visiting faculty member at institutions like Indian Council for Cultural Relations, National School of Drama, and Indira Gandhi National Centre for the Arts, he imparts knowledge on direction and scriptwriting, shaping the future of Indian cinema.

His leadership is evident as the Chairman of the Kolkata International Film Festival for documentaries. He is serving as a consultant for film production for the Jharkhand State Livelihood Promotion Society.

Additionally, he has taken on the role of Festival Director for the 'Smile International Film Festival for Children & Youth' in partnership with Lake International School, Bhimtal, Nainital, and the Film Trust of India, fostering a platform for young filmmakers. Smile International Film Festival for Children & Youth

He has served as the guest editor for the Shyam Benegal special issue of Hans (magazine).

== Personal life ==
He is married and lives in Delhi.

== Awards ==
- 1992: Bhagirathi Ki Pukaar (Call of the Bhagirathi) – National Film Award for Best Investigative Film (Director and Producer)
- 1994: The Women Betrayed – National Film Award for Best Non-Fiction Film on Social Issues (Producer)
- 1996: Sona Maati – National Film Award – Special Jury Prize (Producer)
- 1996: Sona Maati – Golden Lotus in the Mumbai International Film Festival
- 1998: Kol Tales, International Jury Prize, Mumbai International Film Festival
- 2003: Swaraaj – The Little Republic – received the Golden Prize in IRIB – International Film Festival, Isfahan, Iran (Producer and Director)
- 2003: Swaraaj – National Award for Best Feature Film on Social Issues
- 2004: Swaraaj – Audience Favorite Award in Palm Springs International Film Festival (California, USA) 2004
- 2004 Swaraaj – Netpac (critic) award Best Director Award at Dhaka International Film Festival
- 2010 Anwar – Dream of a Dark Night —International jury mention at Mumbai International Film Festival
- 2010: Harvest of Grief has received an award certificate in 2010Los Angeles Reel Film Festival.
