= Paul Delmas-Marsalet =

French professor of neuropsychiatry at Bordeaux University (1898-1977)

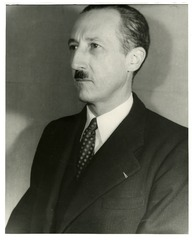
- Born: August 4, 1898; Dax
- Died: July 29, 1977; Léognan
- Citizenship: French
- Occupation: Professor of neuropsychiatry
- Organization: University of Bordeaux
- Known for: research on electroconvulsivotherapy

Paul Delmas-Marsalet (1898-1977) was a French physician and professor of neuropsychiatry at the University of Bordeaux who played a major role in the development of clinical and experimental neurosciences.

== Biography ==
Paul Delmas-Marsalet was born on 4 August 1898 in Dax (Landes) and died on 29 July 1977 in Léognan (Gironde). He came from a long line of doctors dating back to the fourteenth century. He was the son of Jean Baptiste Maurice Delmas-Marsalet (1869–1918), a doctor who died during the First World War as a result of exposure to mustard gas, and Marie Clotilde Yvonne Darroze (1876–1952), a daughter of Dr Alfred Darroze the founder of the medicinal spa in Préchacq. Delmas-Marsalet's father was director of the Grands Thermes (medical spa) in Dax, which was founded by his grandfather (also named Paul Delmas-Marsalet) in 1871. His younger brother Alfred Delmas-Marsalet (1905–1945), a general practitioner and member of several Resistance networks, died in deportation on 27 April 1945 after being captured in 1944. Having taken charge of his three youngest brothers and sisters following the premature death of his father, he also looked after his four nephews and nieces after his brother's death.

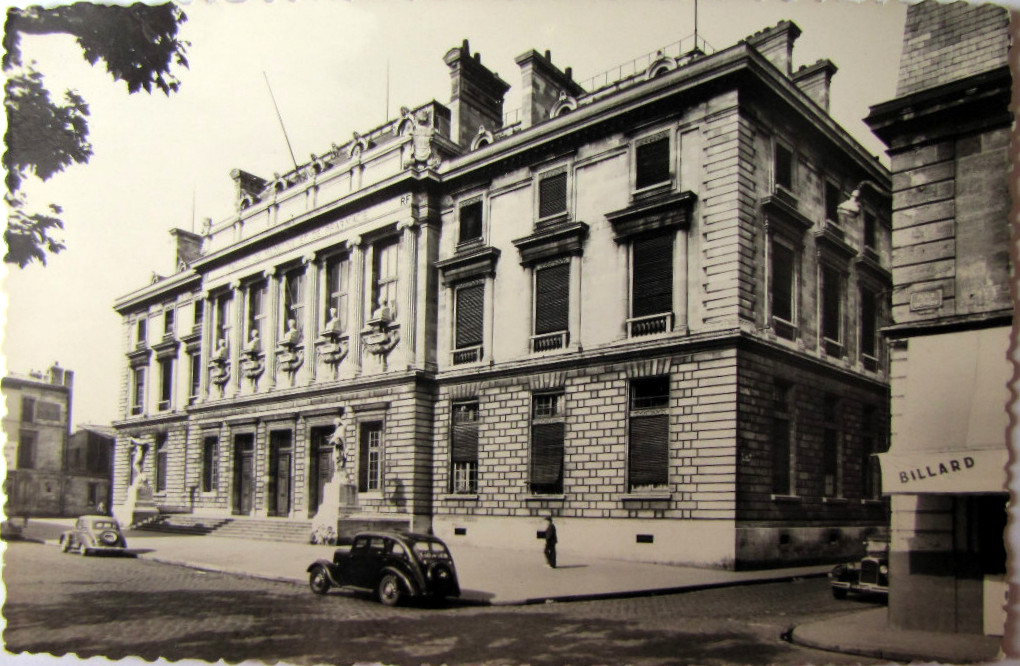
Bordeaux old Faculty of Medicine and Pharmacy

He attended secondary school in Bayonne, and then began his medical studies in Bordeaux before enlisting in the army in 1917, first as a stretcher-bearer and then as an auxiliary doctor with the 30th Infantry Regiment. After the war, he continued his medical studies in Bordeaux, whilst working as a laboratory assistant in Professor Victor Pachon's physiology laboratory from 1921 to 1929. He passed the competitive examination for the internship programme in Bordeaux in 1922, and in 1927 was awarded the internship gold medal, before becoming senior registrar to Professor Henri Verger (1873–1930). In 1925, he received his Doctor of Medicine degree after defending his thesis on the motor functions of the caudate nucleus in dogs, based on his research in Professor Pachon’s laboratory. He came first in the agrégation examination in 1930. Appointed as a hospital doctor in 1931, he was subsequently named head of the neurology department at Saint-André Hospital in Bordeaux. In 1941, he succeeded Professor Jean Abadie as full professor of the Chair of Clinical Neurology and Psychiatry at the Faculty of Medicine in Bordeaux.

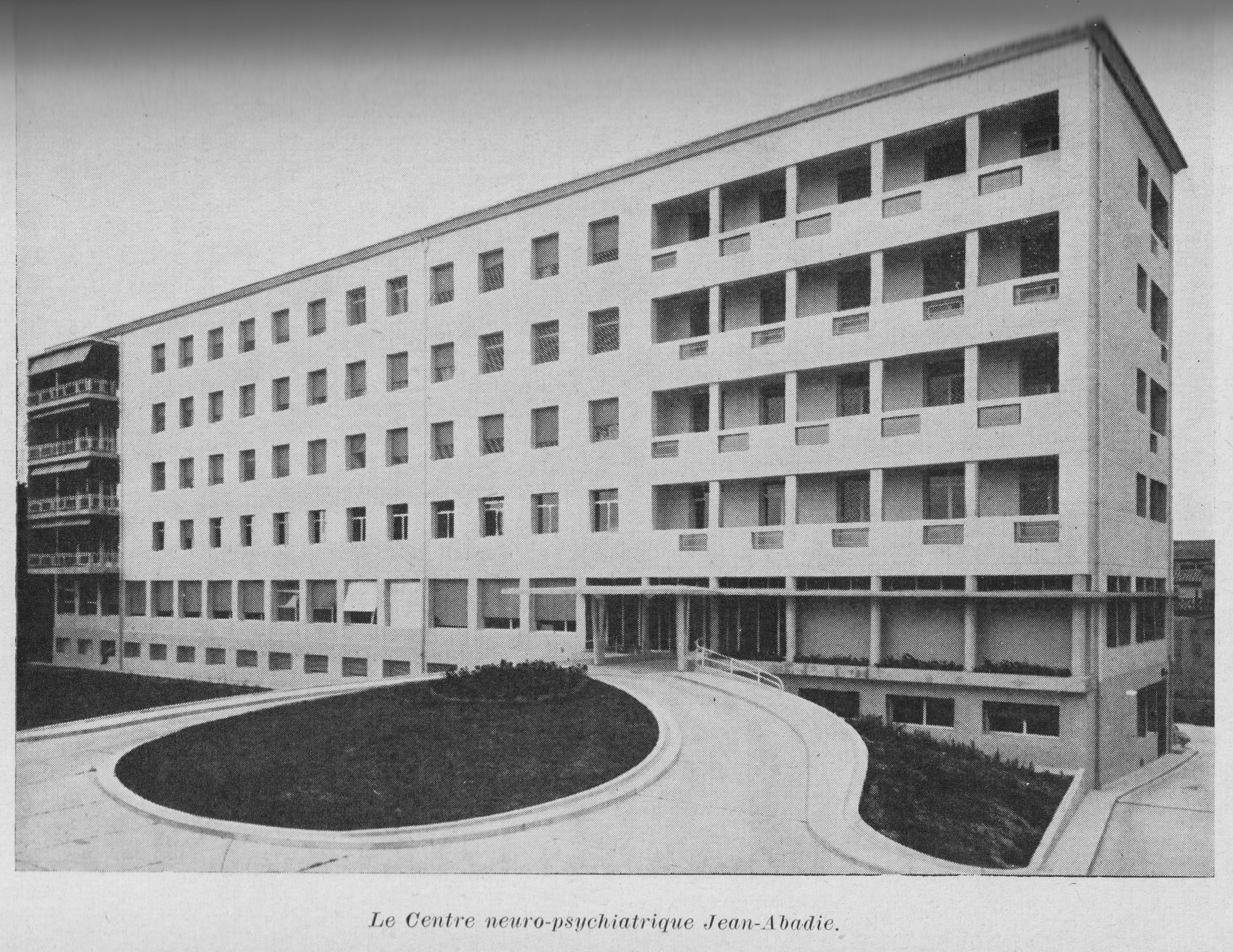
Jean Abadie neuropsychiatric center created by Paul Delmas-Marsalet (Bordeaux Universitary hospital, 1956)

In 1956, he founded the Centre Jean Abadie, named in honour of his mentor, drawing inspiration from the North American model of integrated academic neuropsychiatry. This hospital centre was built by the architects Richard-Chauvin and Mathieu behind Bordeaux Children's Hospital, following the demolition of the former infectious diseases ward. It was funded by local authorities chaired by the Mayor of Bordeaux, Jacques Chaban-Delmas. As the first of its kind in France, the centre was regarded at the time as the “most modern neuropsychiatric centre in Europe”. It brought together all brain-related specialities under one roof: neurology, neurosurgery, neuroradiology, neuropathology, functional investigations, and psychiatry.

Paul Delmas-Marsalet was a member of the Bordeaux Society of Medicine and Surgery from 1932, and a national corresponding member of the French National Academy of Medicine from 20 July 1961 until his death in July 1977.

== Work and research ==
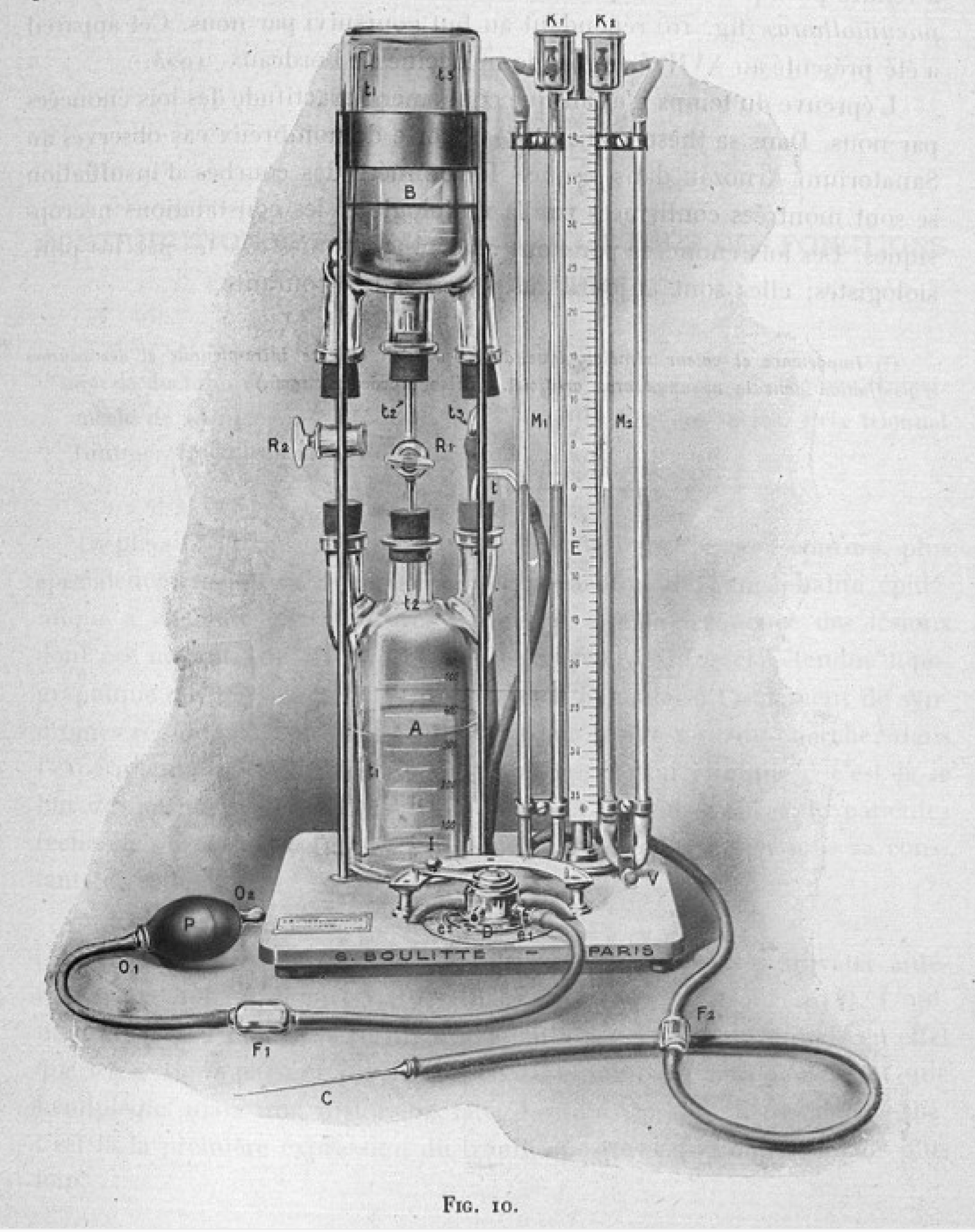
Artificial pneumothorax apparatus created by Paul Delmas-Marsalet (1923)

Paul Delmas-Marsalet was one of the French pioneers of clinical and experimental neuroscience research. He began his research training in the physiology laboratory of Professor Victor Pachon, the inventor of the oscillometer that is used to measure blood pressure. There he developed an interest in the construction of medical devices, some of which were highly unconventional. He continued his research during his residency with Professor Leuret. He discovered the Delmas-Marsalet laws concerning effective pressures in pneumothorax. He modified the devices in use at the time and developed a new artificial pneumothorax apparatus. During his academic career, he conducted numerous pioneering research projects, such as those beginning in 1935 on the neurosurgical treatment of post-encephalitic Parkinson's disease. He conducted research into lesions of the frontal lobes, which he presented at the International Congress of Neurosurgery in London in 1935 with the aid of a film. He piloted studies on a wide range of other conditions: dementia-related encephalopathies, phakomatosis, general paresis, treatment of facial neuralgia using alcohol injections, and epilepsy. He published two handbooks on neurology and biopsychology, which were regarded at the time as reference works.

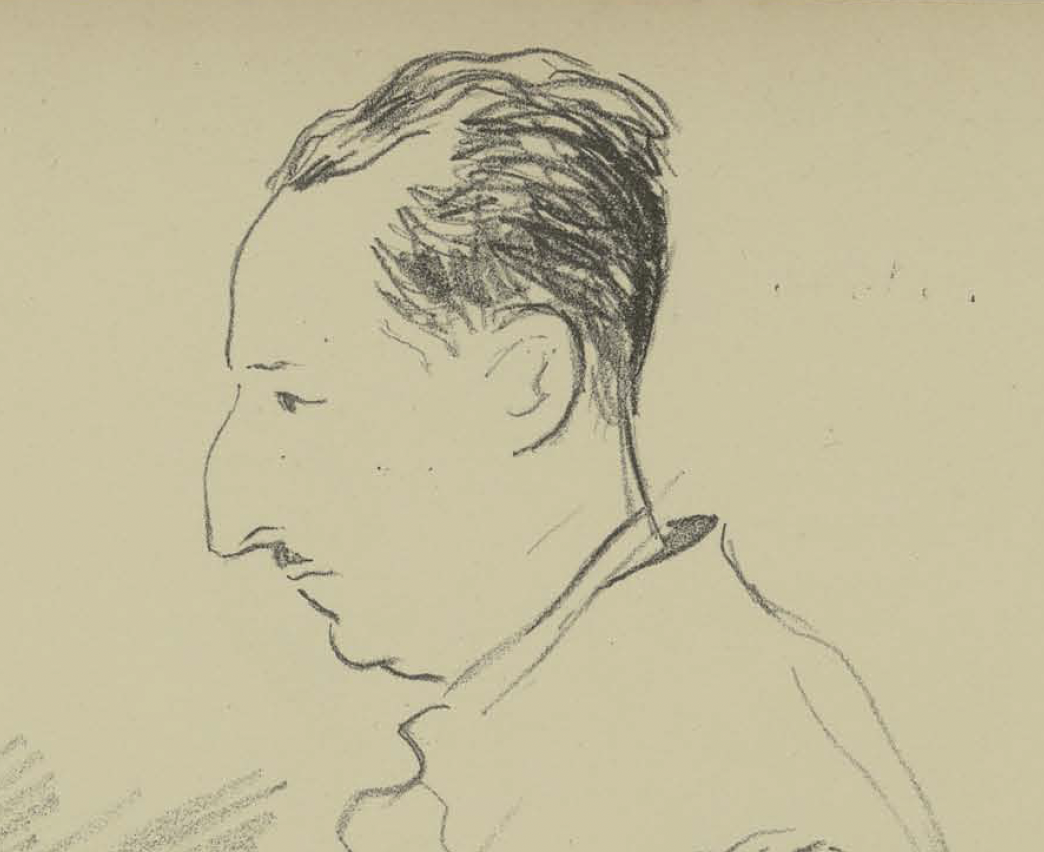
Paul Delmas-Marsalet (Pazzi, 1935)

Paul Delmas-Marsalet was a physician and researcher of international renown, particularly for his work on electroconvulsive therapy (ECT). He played a major role in introducing ECT is treatment in France, following its discovery and first therapeutic applications in 1938 by the Italian psychiatrists Ugo Cerletti (1877–1963) and Lucio Bini (1908–1964). In 1941, Paul Delmas-Marsalet designed an ECT machine bearing his name. It was the second such device designed in France, following the Lapipe-Rondepierre apparatus developed in 1940 by Dr Marcel Lapipe of Vaugirard Hospital and Dr Jacques Rondepierre of Ville-Evrad Psychiatric Hospital. The Delmas-Marsalet machine, the first to use direct current and characterised by its ease of use, was employed for decades. Professor Marc Louis Bourgeois, a student of Delmas-Marsalet, established the first ECT unit in Bordeaux, which he named the Delmas-Marsalet Unit in honour of his mentor.

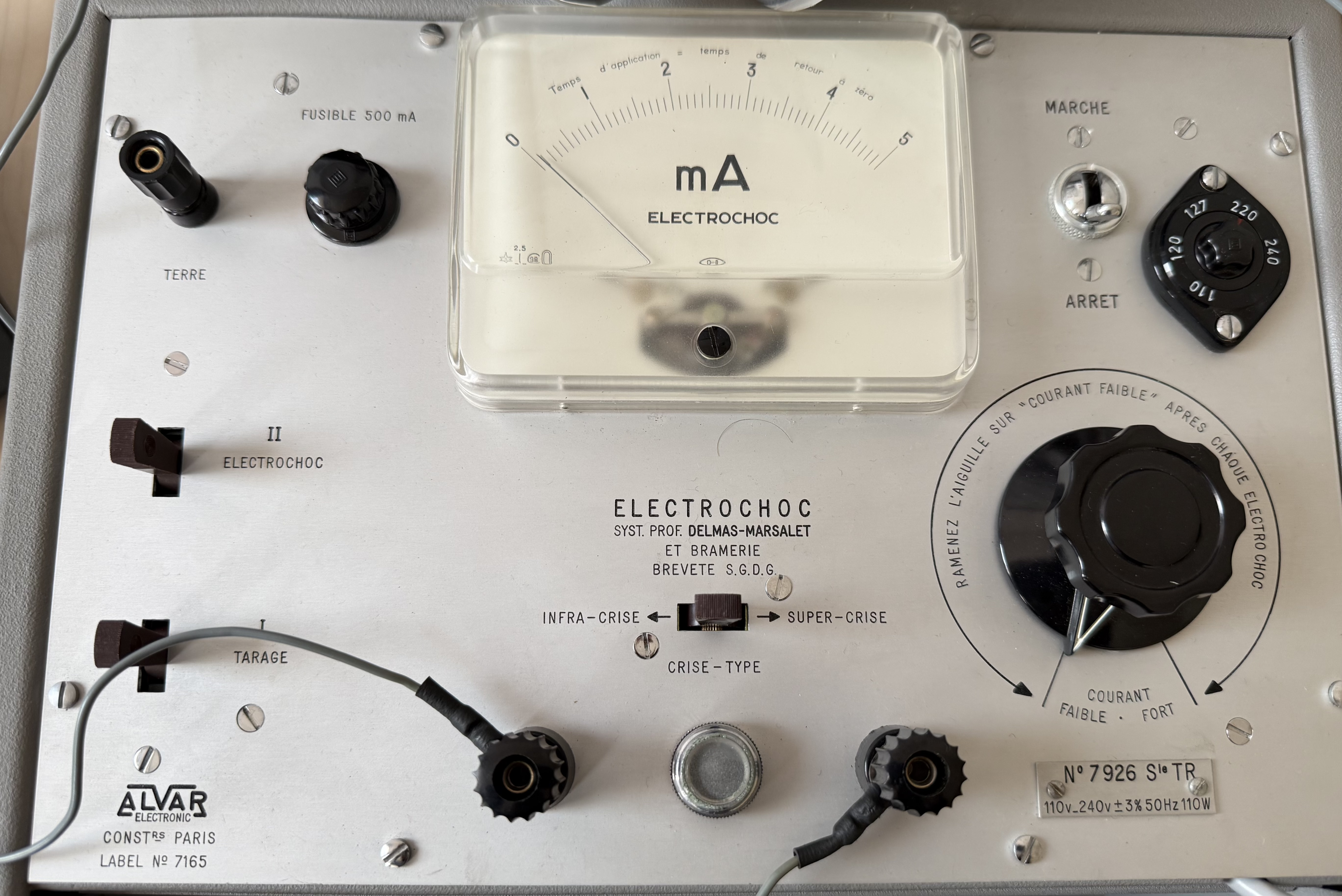
Convulsivotherapy apparatus created by Delmas-Marsalet

In 1943, Paul Delmas-Marsalet published his first book, Therapeutic Electroconvulsive Therapy and Dissolution-Reconstruction, in which he theorised an explanatory model of the mechanism of action of ECT on psychiatric disorders. Inspired by the theories of Huglings Jackson, his hypothesis was based on a hierarchical model of neuropsychic functions, the architecture of which he posited to be disorganised in psychiatric disorders and reorganised under the influence of ECT. This theory was to inspire the model of organodynamism subsequently developed by Henri Ey, and was also cited by Georges Canguilhem in his work The Normal and the Pathological. According to Canguilhem, Paul Delmas-Marsalet's theory illustrates the fact that the transition from the pathological to the normal under the effect of treatment does not involve a ‘reconstruction’ identical to the initial state, but rather a new form of organisation. Paul Delmas-Marsalet wrote a second book in 1946 on ECT.

Paul Delmas-Marsalet is described by his contemporaries as having an extraordinary personality. An inventor and worker who slept very little and wrote extensively, he was also a speaker who was committed to teaching. As part of his job as dean of the medical school, he was responsible for organising the annual review, during which one of his machines was subsequently displayed for years. Upon his departure from the university, he delivered a farewell lecture on 28 June 1969. With all his academic decorations on display, he was dressed in one of the few traditional academic gowns to have escaped destruction by the fires set off by students in the May 1968 revolution: "a farewell lecture archetypical of an academic with a flamboyant personality who left a lasting impression on an entire generation of students and doctors in Bordeaux".

== See also ==
- Albert Pitres
- Emmanuel Régis
- Jean Abadie
- Marc Louis Bourgeois
- Michel Bénézech
