= Marc Louis Bourgeois =

French professor of psychiatry at Bordeaux University (1934-2025)

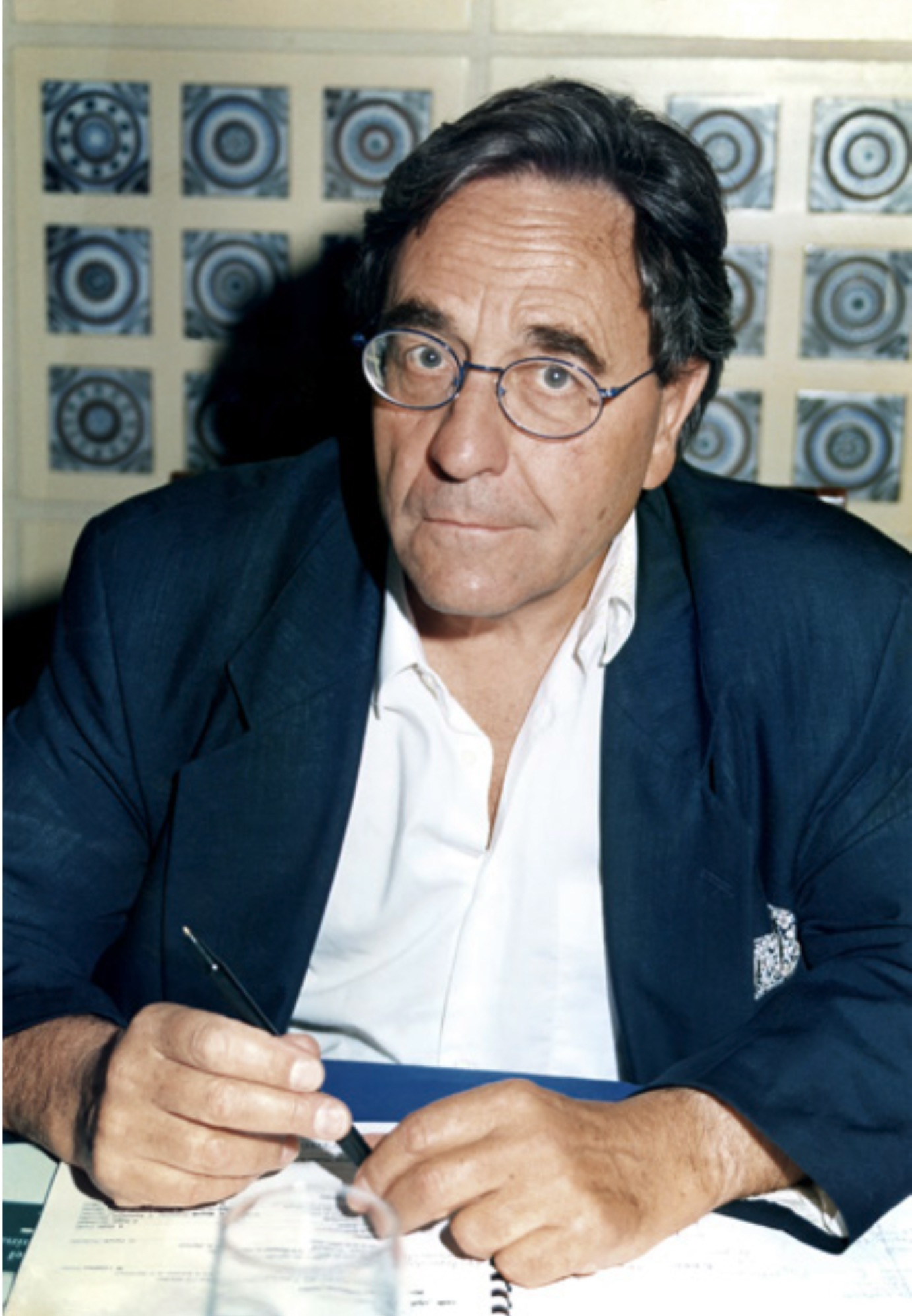
- Born: January 8, 1934; Paris
- Died: December 1, 2025; Bordeaux
- Citizenship: French
- Occupation: Professor of Psychiatry
- Organization: University of Bordeaux

Marc Louis Bourgeois (1934-2025) was a French neuropsychiatrist and professor of psychiatry at the Faculty of Medicine in Bordeaux. He was one of the pioneers in France of a medical psychiatry that was open to international models, and one of the most eminent founders of the contemporary Bordeaux school of university psychiatry.

== Biography ==
Marc Louis Bourgeois was born on 8 January 1934 in Paris and died on 1 December 2025 in Bordeaux. His family were originally from Picardy, and his father was an engineer with French National Railways. He attended the Lycée Charlemagne in Paris, and then passed the entrance examination for the medical military school in Bordeaux, otherwise known as the Santé Navale.

He studied medicine in Bordeaux, initially at the Saint André Hospital, where he trained in internal medicine, endocrinology, paediatrics and intensive care. He passed the competitive examination for the internship programme in Bordeaux in 1957. On 15 December 1958, he defended his doctoral thesis in medicine on a topic in rheumatology. In it, he referred to the work of Jean-Martin Charcot, who had also defended a thesis on rheumatic diseases in 1853.

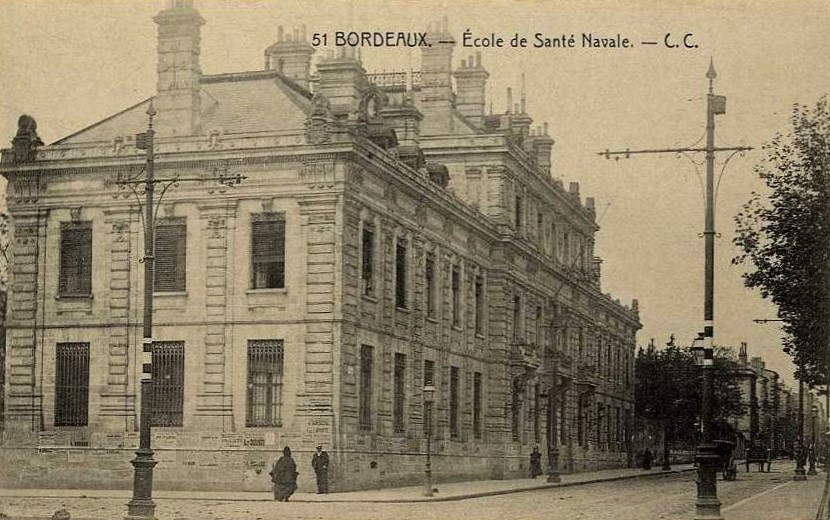
Bordeaux Medical Military School "Santé Navale"

After passing the medical residency entrance examination, Marc Louis Bourgeois chose to specialise in neuropsychiatry. He began his residency in this speciality in 1962 at the highly prestigious Centre Jean Abadie, a neuropsychiatric centre where candidates were rigorously selected. All brain-related specialities were to be found in this centre, which was founded in 1956 by Professor Paul Delmas-Marsalet and was considered at the time to be the most modern neuropsychiatric centre in Europe. Marc Louis Bourgeois worked there as a junior doctor and later as a senior registrar. For many years, he practised on the Psychiatric Observation Ward, an emergency department located in the basement of the building that handled all requests for compulsory psychiatric admission from the Gironde department.

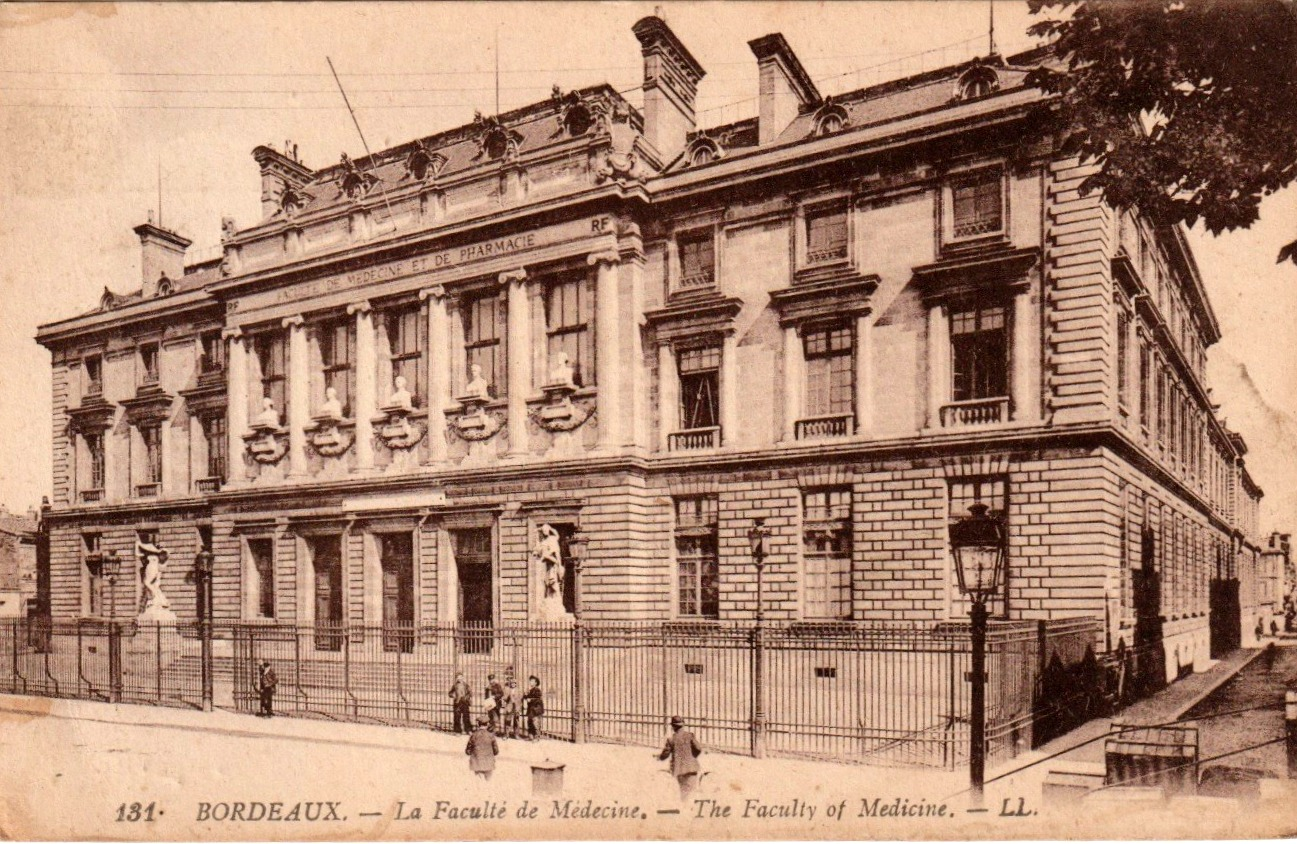
Bordeaux old Faculty of Medicine and Pharmacy

At that time, Professor Paul Delmas-Marsalet (1898–1977) held the Chair of Clinical Neurology and Psychiatry at the Faculty of Medicine in Bordeaux, having succeeded Professor Jean Abadie in 1941. Bourgeois was deeply influenced by the training he received from Delmas-Marsalet, whose reputation as a skilled and charismatic neuropsychiatrist was international. Paul Delmas-Marsalet played a significant role in shaping Bourgeois' view of psychiatry as primarily a medical speciality, as well as in his openness to international clinical and therapeutic models, particularly those of North American psychiatry. Marc Louis Bourgeois's later encounter with Professor Michel Bergouignan (1907–1970) would also have a significant influence on him. Michel Bergouignan, who succeeded Delmas-Marsalet for a year before his death, played a pioneering role in opening up medical psychiatry to medical psychology and the development of psychotherapies.

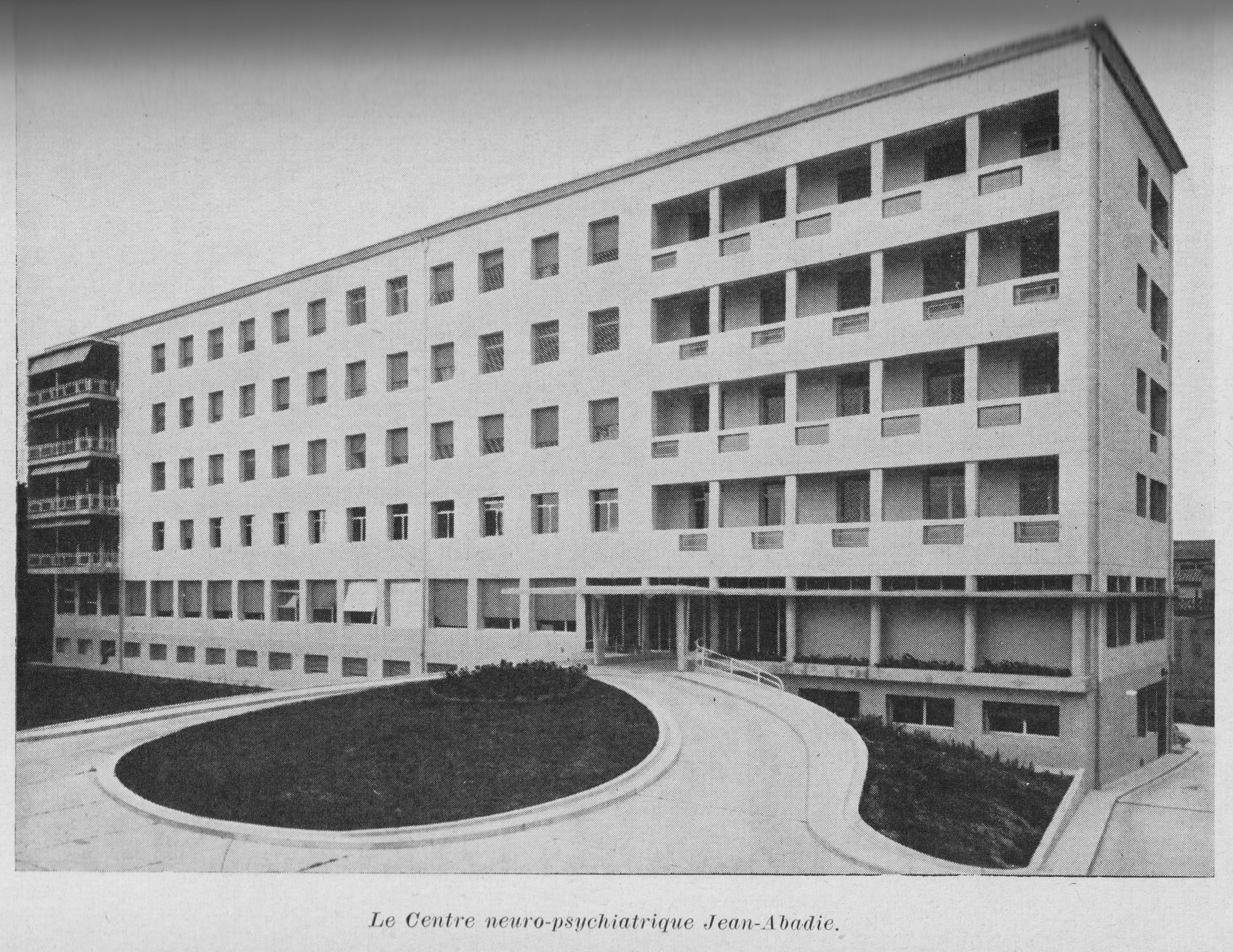
Bordeaux neuropsychiatric centre Jean Abadie in 1956

Bourgeois left the academic Jean Abadie Centre located at the general university hospital for Bordeaux psychiatric hospital in 1973. Following the split between neurology and psychiatry in 1969, Marc Blanc (1915–1996), then the sole professor of psychiatry, decided that university psychiatrists who had previously practised at the general hospital should join the psychiatrists working in psychiatric hospitals. This decision represented a stance entirely at odds with that which had prevailed for decades in Bordeaux, where the long-standing rivalry between neuropsychiatrists in general hospitals and asylum alienists had reached its peak during the tenure of Professor Jean Abadie. Abadie's appointment was contested by Charles Perrens and was annulled by the Council of State, before justice was done to Jean Abadie, who became holder of the Chair of Clinical Neurology and Psychiatry.

After successfully passing the agrégation examination, Marc Bourgeois left for the USA in 1977 to work for a year at Stanford University. There he developed an international academic network that he would maintain throughout his career. From 1981, following the departure of Professor Blanc, he became head of one of the two adult university psychiatry departments at Charles Perrens Hospital, and was in charge of patients from the Caudéran-Le Bouscat suburbs of Bordeaux. Upon leaving the hospital in 1999, he continued to practise privately. He also pursued an intense programme of publication and research, and in 2002 at the age of 68 he defended a PhD thesis in psychology on the validation of a scale for complicated grief.

== Work and research ==
Through his training as a neuropsychiatrist under Professors Delmas-Marsalet and Bergouignan, and his openness to anglo-saxons models of psychiatry, Marc Louis Bourgeois played a major role in France in the transmission and preservation of a medical model of psychiatry, both at the clinical and academic levels. In 1993, he wrote: “I personally believe it is necessary to uphold and reaffirm the ‘medical nature’ of psychiatry (mental medicine, psychological medicine, behavioural medicine) and the psychiatrist's identity as a doctor. Neither neuroscience nor psychoanalysis, it is a clinical speciality dealing with the psyche, suffering, its disorders and pathological behaviours, which requires both the modesty and rigour, the experience and empiricism of the doctor.”

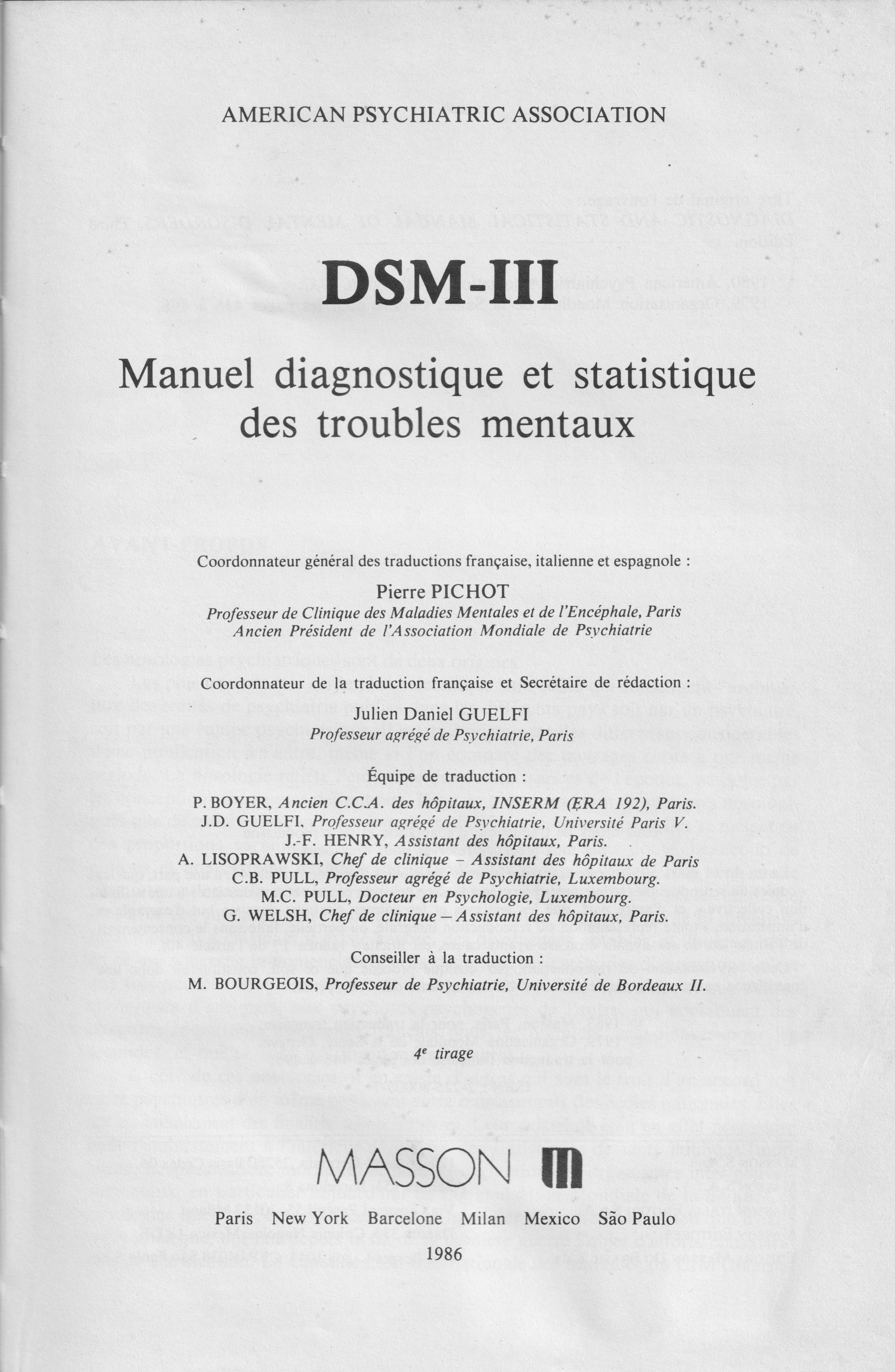
First French translation of DSM-III (1986)

Marc Louis Bourgeois contributed to the translation and dissemination in France of the third edition of the Diagnostic and Statistical Manual of Mental Disorders (DSM-III) in the 1980s, as well as to the validation and widespread use of standardised psychopathological assessment scales.

Marc Louis Bourgeois published as early as 1972 on ecology and the environment in psychiatry. From the late 1970s, he took an interest in the management of gender identity disorders, establishing a medical pathway for gender transition in collaboration with endocrinologists and plastic surgeons at Bordeaux University Hospital. He also contributed to a medical and non-stigmatising approach to addiction, and before substitution treatments were developed, people with opioid dependence were admitted to his department for Anesthélec ("current of Limoge") treatment. Following on from the mother-child hospitalisation programmes already established at the Centre Jean Abadie by Michel Bergouignan, Marc Louis Bourgeois supported and championed the project to create the future perinatal psychiatry network in Bordeaux. Also following in Bergouignan's footsteps, Marc Louis Bourgeois promoted the development of cognitive-behavioural therapies in Bordeaux, establishing a university diploma in 1992 to train healthcare professionals in these therapies. At a time when the practice of electroconvulsive therapy was highly controversial, he consistently maintained access to this treatment—which was then administered using Paul Delmas-Marsalet's apparatus.

Marc Louis Bourgeois authored or co-authored over 500 scientific articles in indexed journals, covering studies and reviews in a wide range of fields, such as semiology and psychopathology, psychopharmacology, medical psychology, forensic psychiatry, and the history of psychiatry.

His major contribution to clinical practice was the founding of the Bordeaux School of bipolar disorders, based on a systematic and rigorous semiological and therapeutic approach to mood disorders, which he summarised in several books. Another major focus of his research and publications was on bereavement and its complications.

Marc-Louis Bourgeois is described by his pupils as a visionary physician with encyclopaedic knowledge. He acted as a bridge between the last generation of French neuropsychiatrists, and the first generation of psychiatrists with a medical vision of psychiatry.

== See also ==
- Albert Pitres
- Emmanuel Régis
- Jean Abadie
- Paul Delmas-Marsalet
- Michel Bénézech
