= Jean Abadie =

French professor of neuropsychiatry at Bordeaux University (1873–1946)

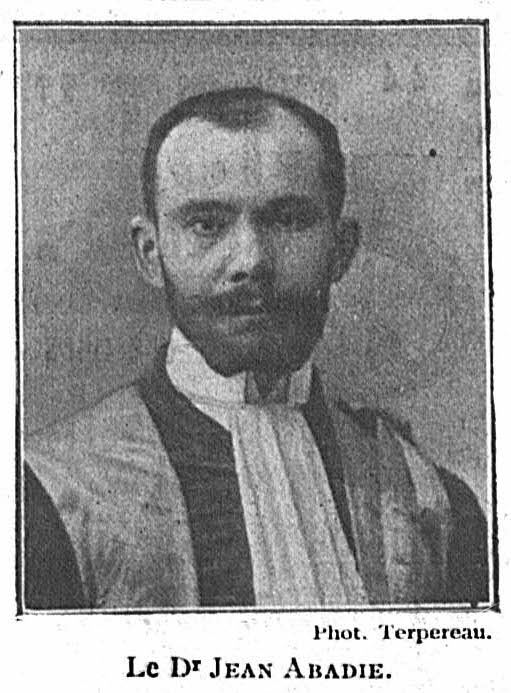
- Born: December 15, 1873; Tarbes
- Died: March 24, 1946; Bordeaux
- Citizenship: French
- Occupation: Professor of neuropsychiatry
- Organization(s): University of Bordeaux, France

Signature
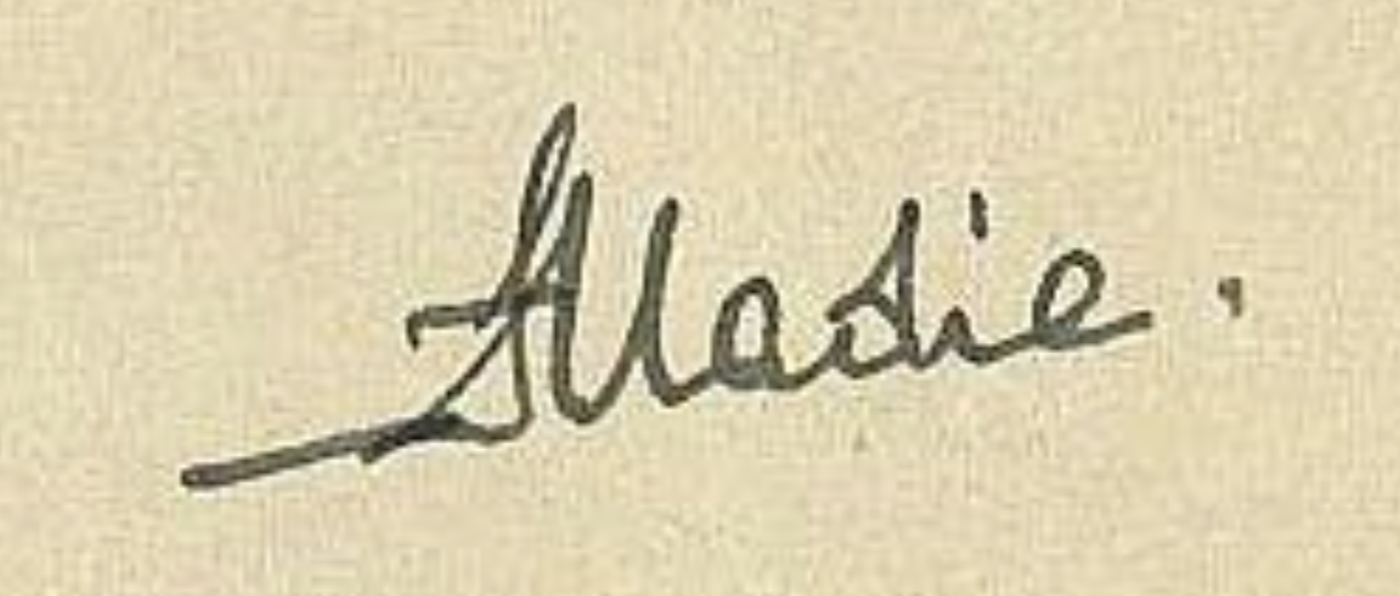

Jean Abadie, born on 15 December 1873 and died on 24 March 1946, was a French medical doctor and professor of neuropsychiatry at the Faculty of Medicine in Bordeaux. He played a major role in the founding of the Bordeaux school of neuropsychiatry and epileptology.

== Biography ==
Joseph Louis Irénée Jean Abadie, known as Jean Abadie, was born in Tarbes at 8 Rue des Pyrénées (Hautes-Pyrénées) on 15 December 1873 and died in Bordeaux (Gironde) on 24 March 1946. His parents were Vital Abadie, a tailor sergeant in the Third Company of Mounted Sergeants, and Jeanne Marie Bourrec. He married Jeanne Marie Andrée Abadie (1881–1974) in Bourg-sur-Gironde on 28 April 1904, from whom he divorced on 14 November 1924. His elder sister, Anne-Marie Antoinette, was the wife of Professor Alexandre Le Dantec (1857–1932), holder of the Chair of Tropical Pathology at the Faculty of Medicine in Bordeaux. His brother, Charles-Albert Abadie (1880–1937), was a songwriter.

During the First World War, Jean Abadie served as a doctor in the Second Group of the General Staff, and subsequently worked as a consultant doctor for the army. He was awarded the Croix de Guerre medal for his military service.

Jean Abadie began his medical studies at the Faculty of Medicine in Bordeaux in 1893, then served as a hospital intern (passing the 1894 examination, then being awarded the bronze medal in 1896 and the silver medal in 1897). He passed the hospital residency examination in 1897, receiving the gold medal in 1900.

He qualified as a doctor of medicine in 1900, served as an assistant professor at the Faculty of Medicine in Bordeaux (1901–1903) in Professor Albert Pitres's department at Saint André Hospital, and was subsequently appointed as a consultant at the Hospitals of Bordeaux (competition 1903). In 1901, he was awarded the gold medal first prize for his medical thesis on The Functional Locations of the Internal Capsule, which he defended on 7 November 1900.

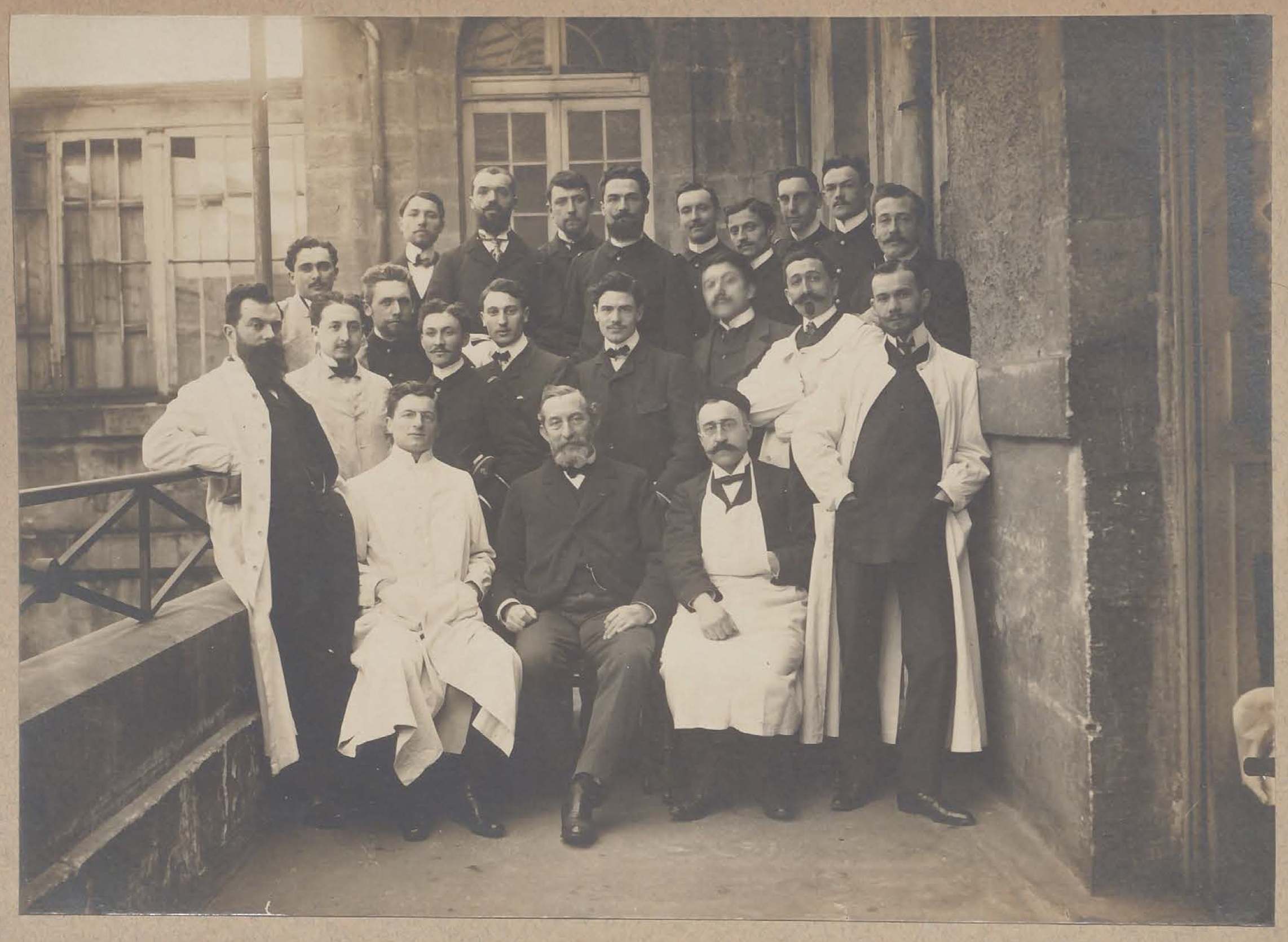
Jean Abadie (first person standing on the right) among members of the medical team of Bordeaux neuropsychiatric department (Prof Pitres, Saint André Hospital, Bordeaux, 1901)

His path to the agrégation exam to become professor was complicated by the rivalry reigning at that time in France between neuropsychiatrists in general hospitals and psychiatrists ("alienists") in psychiatric asylums. Jean Abadie first passed the medical agrégation examination in 1904, then sat the mental health agrégation examination in 1913, where he was ranked first ahead of Dr Charles Perrens. Perrens, also a student of Professor Pitres but who had chosen to continue his training in Paris, challenged this decision before the French State Council, which in 1918 rejected Abadie's appointment on the grounds that a candidate could not sit two different agrégation examinations. This setback was to be very short-lived, however, as it was Jean Abadie, and not Charles Perrens, who succeeded Professor Emmanuel Régis (1855–1918) in 1919 as holder of the clinical chair of neurological and mental disorders at the Faculty of Medicine in Bordeaux.

== Scientific work and publications ==
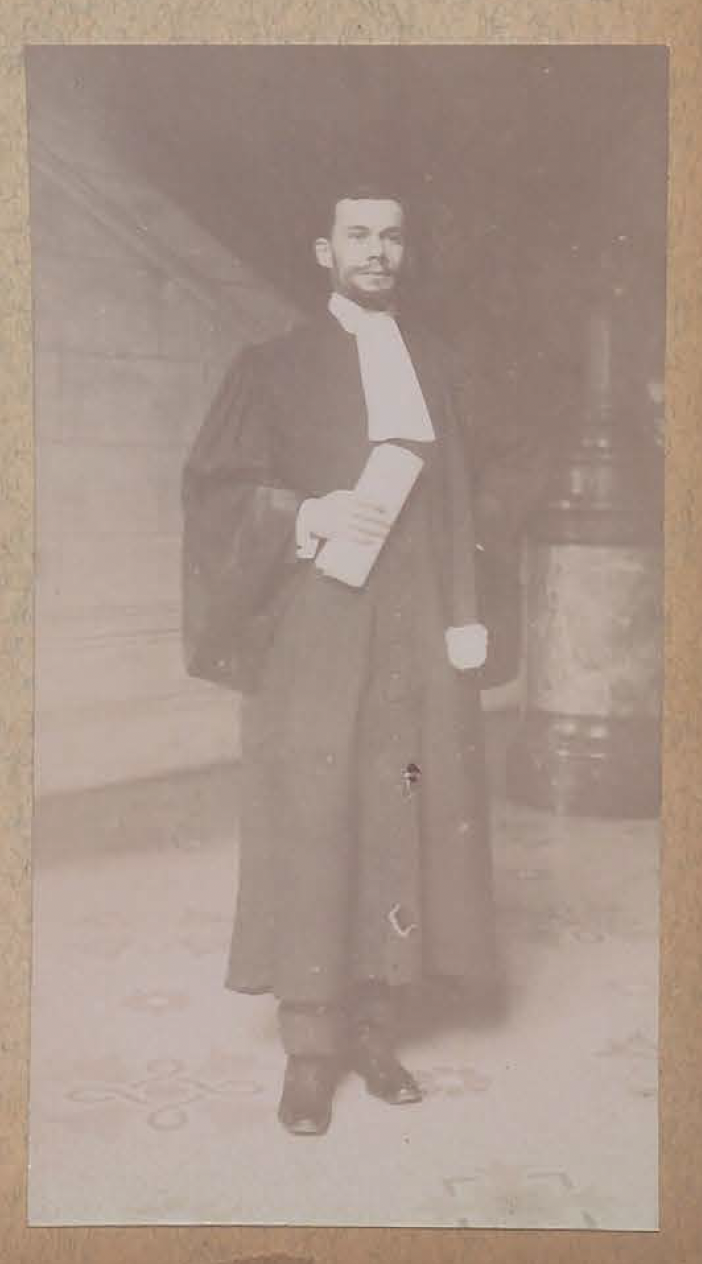
Jean Abadie (1873–1946) Professor of neuropsychiatry at the University of Bordeaux

Jean Abadie was regarded as one of the most brilliant and distinguished figures in French neuropsychiatry of the first half of XXe century. His academic contribution to neuropsychiatry was primarily based on clinical research derived from semiologic and clinical observation. His fame is primarily attributable to his work on epilepsy, which earned him recognition as one of the founders of epileptology. In 1932, he presented a report to the Paris Society of Neurology entitled Modern aetiological concepts regarding epilepsies. In this landmark report, Jean Abadie clarified the clinical and aetiological characteristics of the various types of epilepsy, and drew attention to perinatal risk factors such as obstetric trauma, alcoholism and syphilis in the parents.

His other work covered a very broad spectrum of psychiatric and neurological symptoms and conditions. In particular, he contributed to the study of the semiology of plantar reflexes (Babinski and Schäffer) and the neurological complications of syphilis, describing Abadie's sign, characterised by a lack of sensitivity in the Achilles tendon to pressure in the tabes. He also studied multiple sclerosis, poliomyelitis, subarachnoid haemorrhages and Von Economo's endemic encephalitis. In psychiatry, he took an interest in hysteria and described Argan's syndrome, i.e. the excessive fear of having an illness, aka hypochondriasis. He also contributed to studies on war-related psychiatric disorders.

His work also reflects his interest in therapeutics, at a time when resources for treating neurological and psychiatric conditions were very limited. He conducted research into the therapeutic effects of lumbar punctures and their iatrogenic effects by exploring procedural complications. He also contributed to the development of analgesic techniques involving subarachnoid injection of cocaine for neurological pain.

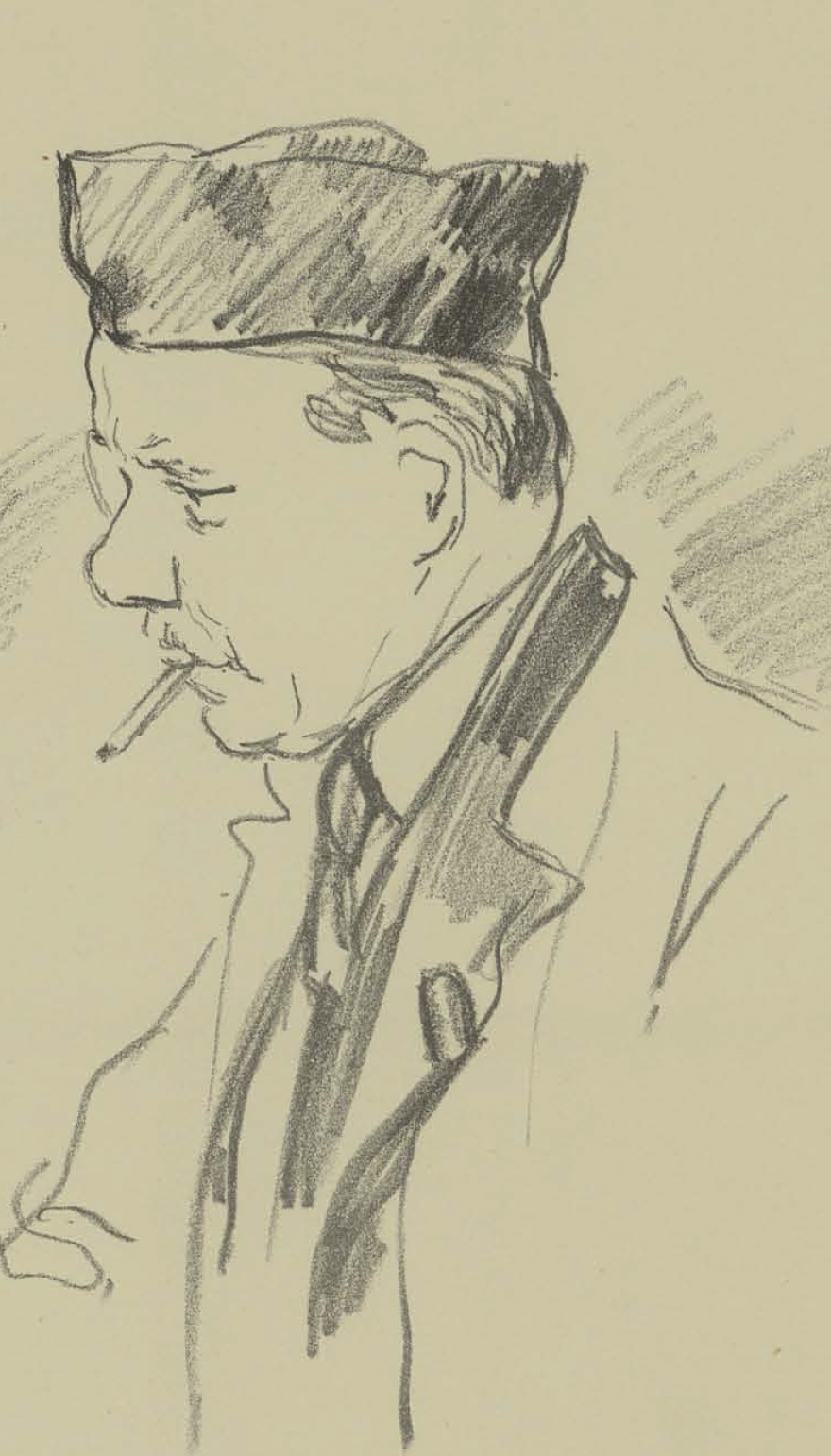
Professor Jean Abadie by Pazzi (1935)

He was also a pioneer in the development of interventions aimed at promoting the inclusion of children with neurodevelopmental disorders in mainstream education. Together with his mentor, Professor Emmanuel Régis, he helped organise schooling for "abnormal children" in the city of Bordeaux, establishing classes within public state schools tailored to their level of disability. More than 1,500 so-called "abnormal children" were registered from 1906 onwards following assessment by members of the medical-educational commission set up for this purpose, of which Jean Abadie was an active member. The first two classes for boys opened in 1907, and the first class for girls in 1908. Jean Abadie continued this work for children with special needs following Professor Régis's death.

Jean Abadie was one of the founders of the Bordeaux university school of neuropsychiatry, based on the model whereby medical psychiatry is a component of a multidisciplinary approach involving several other medical specialities. He was deeply committed to clinical practice and teaching, conducting a ward round every morning at Saint André Hospital and delivering two lectures each week: on Tuesdays on psychiatry and on Saturdays on neurology. As hospital and university posts were voluntary at the time, he devoted his afternoons to his private practice and visited his patients hospitalised at the Castel d’Andorte private clinic located near Bordeaux.

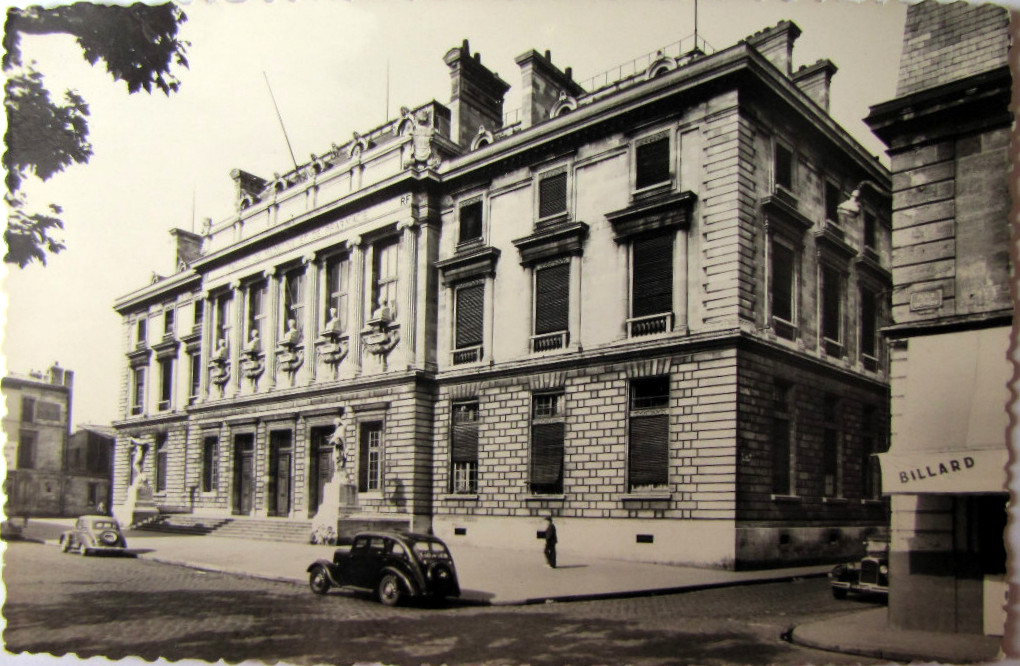
Bordeaux old Faculty of Medicine and Pharmacy

Jean Abadie was a member of the Bordeaux Society of Anatomy and Physiology from 1897 and was awarded first prize in the society's competition in 1899. He was also a member of the Bordeaux Biological Society (from 1902), the Bordeaux Society of Medicine and Surgery (1903), the Paris Society of Neurology (1904), the Paris Society of Psychiatry (1908) and the Clinical Society of Mental Medicine (1913). He was elected a national correspondent of the French National Academy of Medicine in 1938, in the Medicine and Medical Specialities section. He was made an Officer of the Légion d’Honneur in 1928.

Jean Abadie was described by his contemporaries as a rigorous teacher with a keen eye for detail. His way of life was characterised by adherence to unchanging rules and rituals, both in his personal and professional life. According to his pupils who had the privilege of visiting it, his flat at 18 Rue de la Porte Dijeau in Bordeaux was befitting of a lord and an aesthete. In return for the high standards he set, his commitment and devotion to his few select pupils—chosen after a rigorous selection process—were unwavering. The two most renowned were Professor Delmas-Marsalet, a neuropsychiatrist, who succeeded him in 1941 as holder of the chair of clinical neurology and psychiatry at the Faculty of Medicine in Bordeaux, and Professor Henri Pouyanne, a neurosurgeon.

== Tribute ==
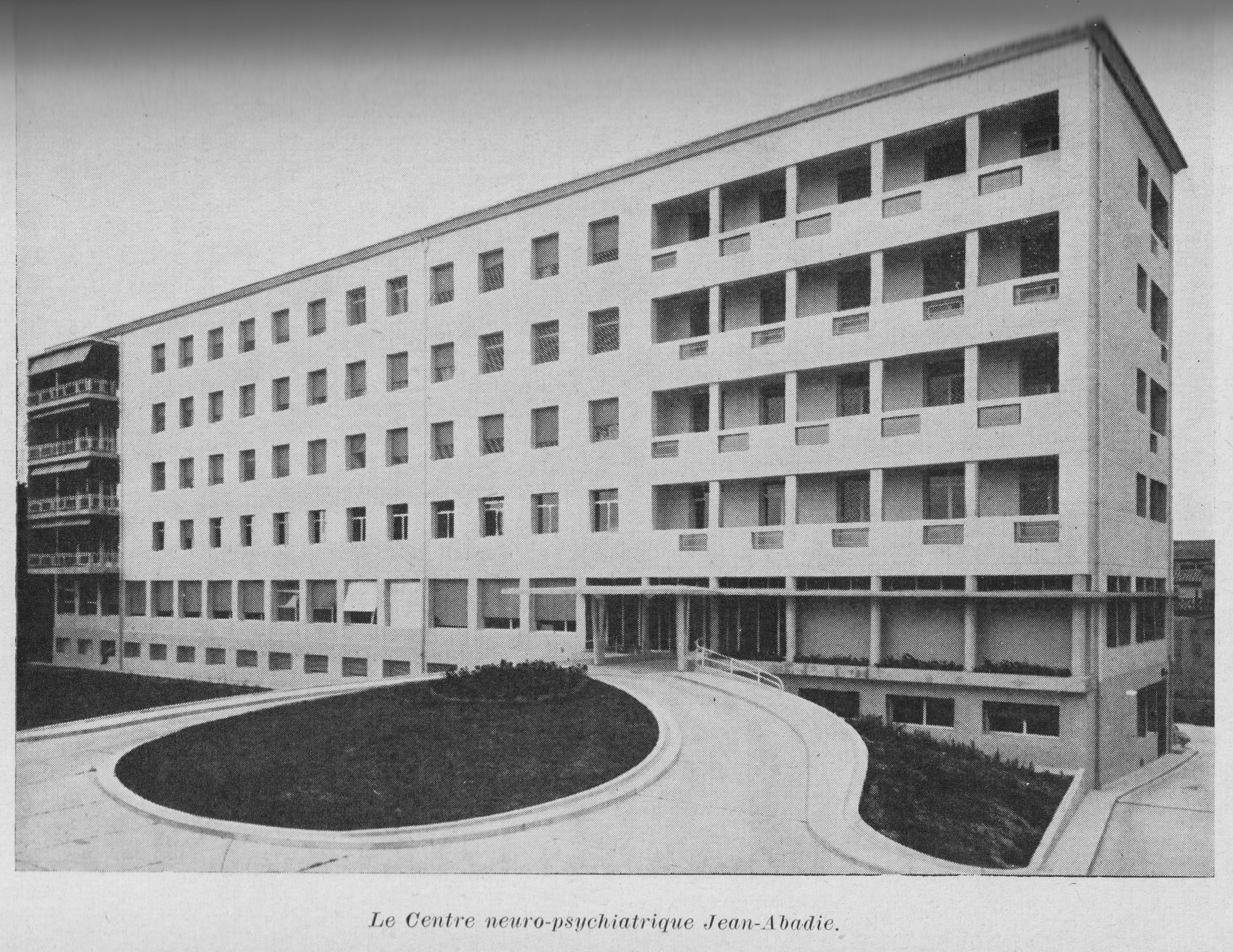
Jean Abadie neuropsychiatric center created by Paul Delmas-Marsalet (Bordeaux Universitary hospital, 1956)

Professor Paul Delmas-Marsalet named the neuropsychiatric centre he founded in 1956 at Bordeaux University Hospital the Centre Jean Abadie in tribute to his mentor. Designed by the architects Richard-Chauvin and Mathieu, the centre was funded by the local authorities under the leadership of the Mayor of Bordeaux, Jacques Chaban-Delmas. Taking its inspiration from the North American model of integrated academic neuropsychiatry, it was the first of its kind in France and was considered "the most modern neuropsychiatric centre in Europe". It brought together all brain-related specialities under one roof: neurology, neurosurgery, neuroradiology, neuropathology, functional investigations, and psychiatry.

The departure of the university psychiatrists (Professor Marc Louis Bourgeois and colleagues) to the Bordeaux psychiatric hospital in 1973, followed by the move of other specialities to other sites of Bordeaux universitary hospital, marked the end of Bordeaux's historic academic neuropsychiatry centre.

== See also ==
- Albert Pitres
- Emmanuel Régis
- Paul Delmas-Marsalet
- Marc Louis Bourgeois
- Michel Bénézech
