= Philip E. Dawson =

American chemistry professor

- Education: Washington University in St. Louis, Scripps Research
- Known for: Synthetic protein chemistry, peptide science

Philip E. Dawson is a scientist and academic leader, known for his contributions to the field of chemistry, particularly in synthetic protein chemistry and peptide science. He currently serves as the Dean of Graduate and Postdoctoral Studies at Scripps Research, where he is also a professor in the Department of Chemistry.

== Early life and education ==
Philip E. Dawson obtained his bachelor's degree in chemistry from Washington University in St. Louis, graduating magna cum laude. He went on to earn his Ph.D. in chemistry from Scripps Research in 1996. Following his doctoral studies, Dawson conducted postdoctoral research at the California Institute of Technology before returning to Scripps Research as an assistant professor.

== Academic and professional career ==
Dawson has held several key positions at Scripps Research throughout his career. He began as an assistant professor in the Department of Cell Biology and later transitioned to the Department of Chemistry. In 2017, he was appointed as the Dean of Graduate and Postdoctoral Studie.

== Research contributions ==
Dawson's research is centered on synthetic protein chemistry, where he has developed methods for the total synthesis of proteins and their bioconjugation.

== Awards and honors ==
- Arthur C. Cope Scholar Award (2024) from the American Chemical Society for his foundational contributions to organic chemistry.
- Cathay Award (2024) from the Chinese Peptide Society for his work in peptide science.
- Max Bergmann Kreis Gold Medal (2011) for outstanding contributions in peptide chemistry.
- Vincent du Vigneaud Award (2010) from the American Peptide Society.
