= Krishi Darshan =

Indian agricultural education show

- Genre: Agriculture
- Country of origin: India
- Original language: Hindi
- No. of seasons: 62
- No. of episodes: 16,780

Production
- Running time: 30 minutes (with commercials)
- Production company: Doordarshan

Original release
- Network: DD National (1967 - 2015); DD Kisan (2015 - present); DD Malayalam (1985-2026)
- Release: 26 January 1967 – present

Krishi Darshan ("Agro-TV") is an Indian television program which premiered on DD National. It premiered on 26 January 1967 and is the longest running television series in India. It is broadcast to 80 villages close to Delhi. In 2015, it was shifted from DD National to DD Kisan, but also airs on the former channel.

== Theme ==
This programme aims at disseminating agricultural information to rural, farming audiences.

== History ==
In its early years, with coverage limited to New Delhi, it aired from 7:30pm to 8pm. It attracted an audience of farmers that regularly attended the teleclubs in and around Delhi.
