= Michel Bénézech =

French forensic psychiatrist and criminologist (1942–2025)

- Born: January 10, 1942; Agen
- Died: May 3, 2025; Bordeaux
- Citizenship: French
- Occupations: Forensic psychiatrist and criminologist
- Organization: University of Bordeaux

Michel Bénézech (1942–2025) was a French psychiatrist, Doctor of Laws, and professor at the University of Bordeaux. He was an expert of clinical criminology and forensic psychiatry. He promoted an approach to criminology based on scientific and multidisciplinary methods, and devoted most of his career to defending the rights and memory of people living with psychiatric disorders.

== Biography ==
Michel Bénézech was born on 1 October 1942 in Agen (Lot-et-Garonne) and died on 3 May 2025 in Bordeaux (Gironde). He was the son of René Bénézech, an optician from a Protestant family, and Marguerite Charles, who raised him in the Catholic faith. He prepared for his baccalaureate at the Lycée Saint Genès in Bordeaux. His school years were marked by numerous disciplinary measures and expulsions, which he attributed to his "rebellious, undisciplined, even provocative spirit, and his aversion to injustice".

=== Academic and medical training ===
Michel Bénézech had a triple background in medicine, law and criminology, which was exceptional for psychiatrists of his generation. On his mother's advice, he began his studies at the Faculty of Medicine in Bordeaux. He was a student of Jean-Didier Vincent, who was at this time senior lecturer in physiology. In 1969, he defended his doctoral thesis in medicine on follicular atrophoderma, a rare dermatological condition of genetic origin. In the same year, he successfully passed the national examinations for the Certificate of Specialised Studies (CES) in forensic medicine. In 1970, he passed the CES examinations in occupational medicine, with a final dissertation on The work of the mentally ill and its disruptive effects in the security ward of Cadillac psychiatric hospital. He obtained the CES in psychiatry in 1973.

Alongside his medical studies, he undertook studies in psychology, anthropology and law. In 1973, he defended a doctoral thesis on Criminal liability of individuals with a Y-chromosome abnormality’ to obtain a PhD in Law and Criminal Sciences from the Faculty of Law at the University of Bordeaux. He obtained the highest French academic degree (HDR, Habilitation à Diriger les Recherches) in 1992.

=== Career at Cadillac-sur-Garonne Forensic Psychiatric Hospital ===
Michel Bénézech spent his entire hospital career in the public psychiatric hospitals of the Gironde. From 1969, he was psychiatry registrar at the psychiatric hospital of Cadillac-sur-Garonne . As the last registrar to be recruited, he took the only vacant post located at the forensic Special Unit for Difficult Patients (SSMD). This forensic psychiatric hospital, now named Unité pour Malades Difficiles (UMD, Unit for Difficult Patients), was opened in 1963. Persons with severe mental illnesses associated with dangerous behaviour are compulsory admitted in the UMD, based on the decision of the state's representative. Thanks to his forensic training, Michel Bénézech quickly settled into this forensic hospital, which was not particularly popular with the other registrars. After his internship, he remained a consultant at the forensic hospital until 1979.

=== Career at the psychiatric service in Bordeaux-Gradignan prison ===
After passing the national competitive examination for hospital psychiatrists in 1979, Michel Bénézech became Head of department at the psychiatric service of Bordeaux-Gradignan prison (Service Médico-Psychologique Régional, SMPR), a position he held until the end of his career.

As head of the prison psychiatric service, Michel Bénézech blew the whistle in 1985 on blood donation in prisons at the start of the acquired immunodeficiency syndrome (AIDS) epidemic. As early as 1984, he noticed that the international press was flagging up the high prevalence of human immunodeficiency virus (HIV) infection among prisoners in the US. In agreement with the health authorities, in early 1985 he introduced systematic HIV screening for intravenous drug users upon their admission to the prison. During a blood donation at the prison in July 1985, this screening identified six out of fourteen donors as HIV-positive. Several regional and national media outlets reported on the high prevalence of HIV infection in prison, triggering significant reactions among prison staff and the prison service. Pressure to halt the screening programme was exerted by the prefecture and the national prison service. Michel Bénézech resisted the pressure and countered it with epidemiological data showing that 54% of intravenous heroin users at Bordeaux-Gradignan prison were HIV-positive. He continued his research into HIV infection among prisoners and established collaborations with internal medicine specialists in AIDS. Despite this warning, blood donations continued in French prisons until 1991. The letter denouncing the decision to carry out screening taken by Michel Bénézech, sent on 31 July 1985 by the Prefect of Gironde to the Ministries of Justice and Social Affairs, can be found in Appendix 138 of the November 1992 report on blood donation in prisons.

In his capacity as head of the prison psychiatric service, another dramatic event brought Michel Bénézech into conflict with the prison service in 2001. On 15 March 2001, a homicide was committed in Bordeaux Gradignan prison by an inmate suffering from a psychotic disorder against a fellow inmate, a murder that received significant media coverage. Against a backdrop of previously strained relations between the psychiatric service and the prison administration, an administrative decision to withdraw Michel Bénézech's authorisation to practise within the prison system was taken on 6 February 2002. The decision was overturned on 15 April 2003 by the Bordeaux Administrative Court.

=== Academic career ===
Throughout his career, Michel Bénézech held a dual academic role, serving as a lecturer and researcher in medicine and law. At the Faculty of Medicine in Bordeaux, he was a research assistant in occupational medicine and forensic medicine in the department of Professor Lazarini (1971–1974), then as a research fellow on mental illnesses in the paediatrics department and the cytogenetics laboratory at the Children's Hospital in Bordeaux (1974–1978). Michel Bénézech was director of clinical training and research at the Aquitaine University Psychiatric Unit (1974–1985), then associate professor of forensic medicine at the Faculty of Medicine in Bordeaux (1989–1992). He was a senior lecturer at the Ecole Nationale de la Magistrature (French Judicial School) in Bordeaux (1970–1985), where he taught clinical criminology, and subsequently an associate professor of private law at the University of Bordeaux IV (1997–2003).

=== Forensic expertise and consultancy in criminology ===
Michel Bénézech was one of the most eminent French experts of his generation in criminology, forensic psychiatry, and in the assessment of the criminal responsibility of people living with psychiatric disorders. He served as a judicial expert at the Bordeaux Court of Appeal from 1974 to 2001. He also served as an advisor on psychiatry and criminology to the Criminal Investigation Division of the Paris Prefecture's Judicial Police (1996), and subsequently to the Behavioural Sciences Department of the French National Gendarmerie (2007), where he helped develop the methodologies of the first behavioural analysis working group.

== Work and research ==
Michel Bénézech authored and co-authored over 600 articles in French-language and international academic journals, and some fifty books. He served as editor-in-chief of the Journal de la Médecine Légale, Droit Médical. His scientific and literary output always focused on the many causes he championed throughout his career, be it to promote a scientific approach to forensic medecine or to defend the rights and memory of people presenting with psychiatric disorders.

=== Links between chromosomal abnormalities and risk of violence ===
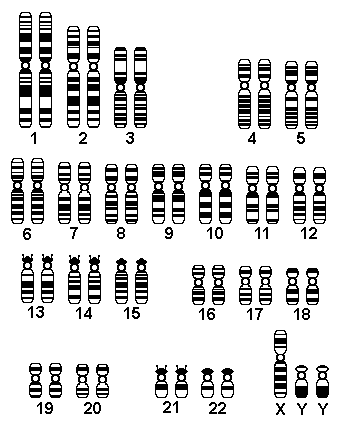
47, XYY karyotype

From the 1970s onwards, Michel Bénézech gained renown for his research into chromosomal abnormalities in people living with psychiatric disorders. His work explored the links between 47,XYY syndrome (supernumerary Y chromosome) and risk of violent behaviour. From the beginning of his internship, he participated in a study on chromosomal abnormalities among patients admitted to the forensic hospital of Cadillac-sur-Garonne, carried out in collaboration with the cytogenetics laboratory at the Chambéry Blood Transfusion Centre.

Using the data collected from this cohort, Michel Bénézech carried out several studies that were published in the national and international scientific press. He demonstrated that the so-called ‘crime chromosome’ hypothesis is unfounded: although the frequency of the 47,XYY syndrome is slightly higher in a population of individuals who have committed violent acts, the vast majority of people with an extra Y chromosome have never come into contact with the law. These findings suggested that the systematic screening for such a chromosomal abnormality is not justified in the context of legal proceedings. This research was summarised in a book and an educational film, which was awarded an honorary diploma at the 36th Congress of the International Association of Scientific Cinema in 1983.

=== Clinical criminology and forensic psychiatry ===
Michel Bénézech's work in the field of criminology primarily aimed at promoting a scientific and multidisciplinary approach to the assessment of violent crimes, with a view to improving criminal profiling, the quality of criminal investigations and the robustness of psychiatric assessment of criminal offenders.

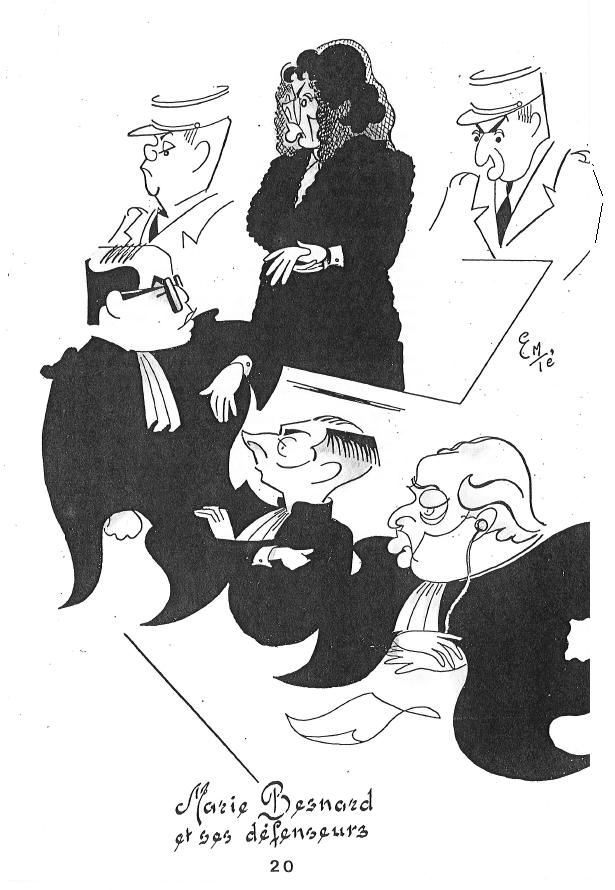
Trial of Marie Besnard in 1952 (Poitiers, France)

Together with Professor Marc-Louis Bourgeois, he conducted his first studies in clinical criminology at the forensic hospital of Cadillac, and was involved in the introduction of the DSM-III in France by conducting a standardised diagnostic assessment of inmates at Bordeaux Gradignan Prison.

Michel Bénézech developed an original method of criminal profiling based on crime scene analysis that comprised six fundamental components: violent, emotional, operational, sexual, relational, circumstantial, whose characteristics must be explored over time (pre-offence, offence and post-offence periods). The method was trialled by the French National Gendarmerie’s Behavioural Analysis Group (GAC) and attracted the interest of the mainstream press. Building on this standard protocol, Michel Bénézech developed a crime scene assessment technique specific to non-family sexual assaults that was based on the analysis of modus operandi, as well as relational and circumstantial components. Thanks to his expertise in criminal profiling, Michel Bénézech was regularly interviewed by the media in cases of violent crime, including those committed by serial killers.

The need for rigorous standardised forensic psychiatric assessments was central to Michel Bénézech’s thinking. He advocated the use of scientific methods to assess dangerousness and the risk of violent reoffending, as well as the replacement of traditional forensic psychiatric assessment with a comprehensive multidisciplinary criminological analysis. He participated in research projects on actuarial scales aimed at improving the prediction of the risk of perpetrating violent acts.

Michel Bénézech’s interest in criminology was also evident in the numerous studies of famous crimes he published in academic articles and in two of his books, La Chair de l’âme and A-t-on jugé Marie Besnard, le dossier de l’affaire. In these works, he analysed past and contemporary crimes, as well as those described in literary works.

His last contribution to criminology was focused on the links between radicalization and psychiatric disorders. He sought to demonstrate that organised terrorist acts are not attributable to severe psychiatric disorders, but that such disorders may be associated with the ‘lone wolf’ phenomenon. Michel Bénézech was consulted in 2017 as an expert for the report on Psychiatry and Radicalisation by the French Federation of Psychiatry.

=== Rights of people living with psychiatric disorders ===
Michel Bénézech's commitment to promoting forensic psychiatry practice based on scientific methods is also reflected in his advocacy and work concerning the rights of people living with psychiatric disorders. In 1978, he co-authored a book on The Criminal Irresponsibility of the Mentally Disabled in which he compared various international laws. He defended the right of patients involved in forensic cases to undergo a standardised and rigorous assessment of their criminal responsibility and the risk of reoffending. He advocated the creation of a psychiatrist's post for the courts. He spent much time defending the rights of hospitalised patients and advocating legislation governing involuntary psychiatric hospitalisation. He co-authored books on medical confidentiality and user information in medicine.

=== Memorial work concerning the Cemetery of the Forgotten in Cadillac-sur-Garonne ===
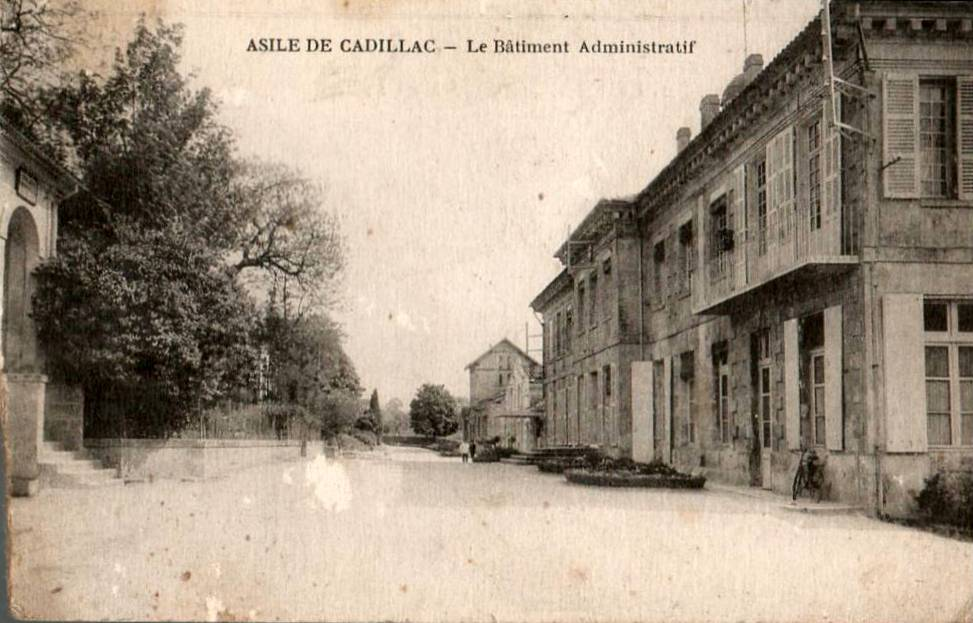
Lunatic asylum of Cadillac-sur-Garonne at the beginning of XX° century

Michel Bénézech made a significant contribution to preserving the memory of the living and dying conditions of those hospitalised at the psychiatric hospital in Cadillac-sur-Garonne. He conducted an in-depth study of the impact of the two world wars on the functioning and missions of the hospital. During World War I, Professor Emmanuel Régis (head of academic psychiatry at the Bordeaux Faculty of Medecine) organized the hospitalization of more than 500 soldiers with psychiatric disorders at the Cadillac lunatic asylum. One third of them died there, most often from tuberculosis. During World War II, those hospitalised at the asylum suffered from starvation due to very severe food restrictions, a problem that affected most psychiatric hospitals in France at the time.

Michel Bénézech's memorial work is exemplified by his campaign to restore the Cemetery of the Forgotten (Cimetière des Oubliés) at Cadillac hospital, so that the memory and dignity of those buried there should remain in people's minds. The cemetery was created on land purchased by the town in 1920, due to the high number of deaths at the asylum that the municipal cemetery could not deal with. Soldiers from the World War I who died at the asylum were buried there in the section known as the ‘brain-injured plot’, along with more than 4,000 people born between 1869 and 1948. The last burial took place in 2000.

In 2007, Michel Bénézech undertook the task of identifying these ‘forgotten’ individuals using the hospital's archives. After several years of painstaking investigation, he managed to identify 895 graves and everyone buried in the cemetery. This identification work led to the creation of a database of names now available online on the Nouvelle-Aquitaine Region's Heritage and Inventory website, so that relatives can search for a buried person and find their location in the cemetery. At the request of the residents of Cadillac, Michel Bénézech founded the Association called the Amis du Cimetière des Oubliés (Friends of the Cemetery of the Forgotten), of which he was president. His case for demonstrating the historical significance of this cemetery convinced the Regional Commission for Historical Heritage and Sites. The listing of part of the site and its walls on the Inventory of Historic Monuments put an end to the risk of the cemetery being destroyed to make way for a car park. This case also convinced the Nouvelle-Aquitaine Regional Council of the cemetery's historical and commemorative significance, leading to the listing of the entire site and the funding of its restoration, which was carried out between 2018 and 2020. Thanks to the survey carried out by Michel Bénézech, a "wall of remembrance" was created bearing the names of those who had previously been ‘forgotten’. The Cimetière des Oubliés was inaugurated on 19 September 2020.

The Cemetery of the Forgotten at Cadillac-sur-Garonne psychiatric hospital

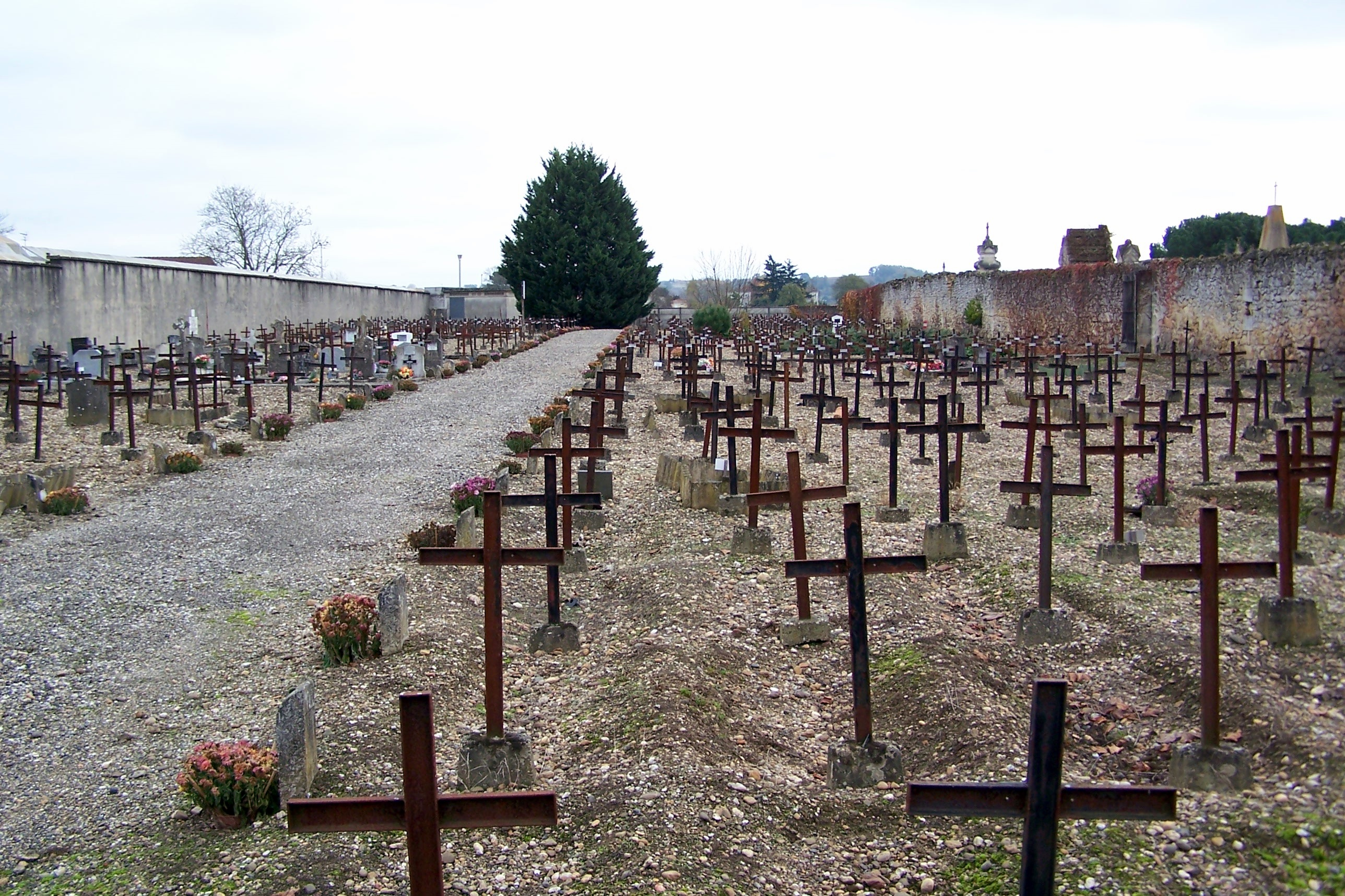
The cemetery before the restoration

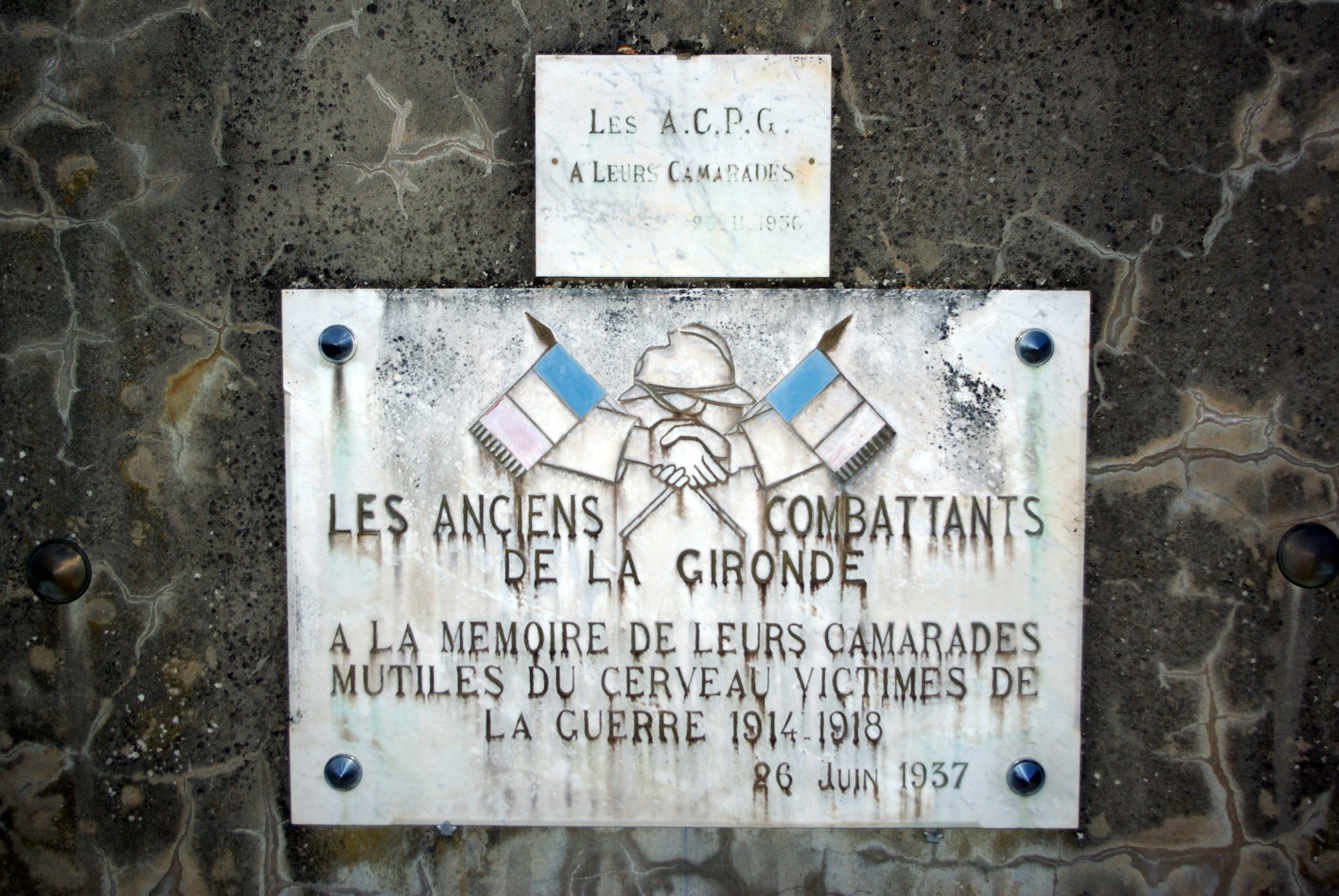
Memorial to the World War I soldiers hospitalized in the asylum and buried in the ‘brain-injured’ section

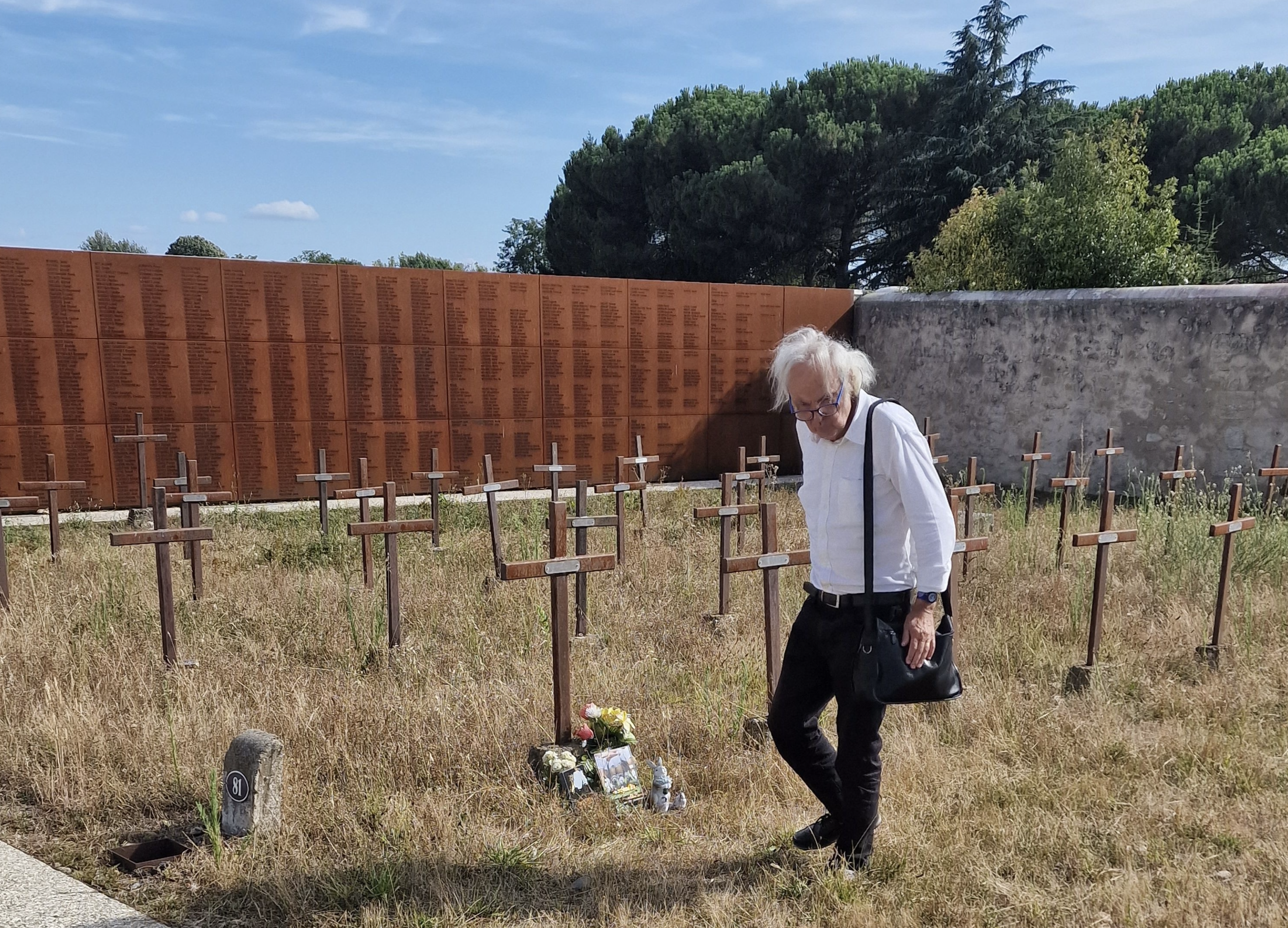
Michel Bénézech in the cemetery after the restoration

Michel Bénézech's commitment to preserving the Cemetery of the Forgotten in Cadillac stems from a fascination with death that runs through his entire career. He described his vocation for forensic medicine in these words: "Death and illness are the only important things in life. Crime is a tragic aspect of humanity. Perhaps I chose this path to control my matricidal impulses... Taking an interest in criminals is perhaps a way of becoming one of them by proxy". He was buried in the Chartreuse cemetery in Bordeaux, where he loved to walk and to which he dedicated a short story.

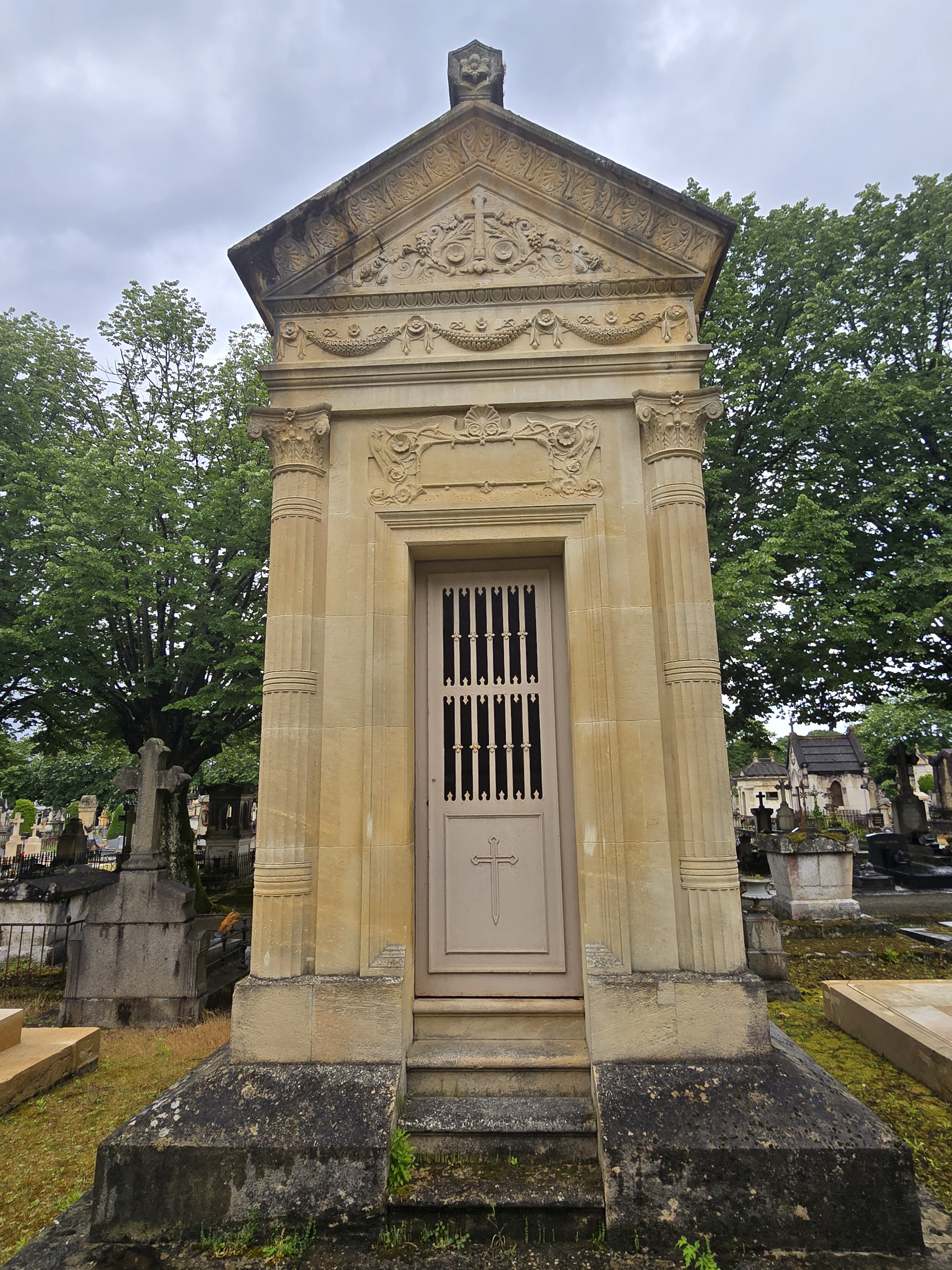
Michel Bénézech's grave in the Chartreuse cemetery (Bordeaux)

== See also ==
- Marc-Louis Bourgeois
- Paul-Delmas Marsalet
- Jean Abadie
- Emmanuel Régis
- Albert Pitres
