= National Mission on Monuments and Antiquities =

Indian agency responsible for archaeological publication and preservation

Agency overview
- Formed: 2007; 18 years ago
- Type: Scholarly communication
- Jurisdiction: India
- Status: Active
- Headquarters: GE Building, Red Fort, Delhi
- Agency executive: V. Vidyavathi, Director General; Addtl. Director General (vacant); Sanjay Kumar Manjul, Joint Director General; Madhulika Samanta, Director
- Parent agency: Ministry of Culture
- Child agency: Archaeological Survey of India
- Website: nmma.nic.in

The National Mission on Monuments and Antiquities (NMMA) is an Indian government agency responsible for maintaining the cultural heritage database under the Ministry of Culture of the Government of India. It was launched in 2007 aimed at studying, researching and preserving the cultural heritage of India. The main goal of the agency is to make information available online to the general public, explicitly for scholars and students interested or associated with the subject. Till 2016, it documented 3.15 lakhs of built heritage and sites and 1,400,740 antiquities collected from different published and unpublished secondary sources, originally investigated or studied by the researchers, educators, scholars and archaeologists.

Responsible to maintain two national registers such as national registers on antiquities and national register on Built Heritage & Sites (BH&S), it is referred to one of the important databases of the country in architectural and historical perspectives alongside the Archaeological Survey of India, a nodal agency of the NMMA. It collaborates contractually with the state governments to collect reference works for managing its database more efficiently as amended by the union government.

== Overview ==
The agency on its web portal publishes cultural heritage related information taken from secondary source such as district departments, the Imperial Gazetteer, academic journals and published library catalogs that originally belongs to the state administration and university's archaeology departments. It also takes unpublished university thesis and survey reports referenced by the researchers, scholars, educators and contemporary concerned officers.

It has documented about 61,132 antiquities in association with Documentation Resources Centre. The agency has added more 15,000 antiquities by 31 March 2016. It computerized remaining raw data from 2014 to 2015 which was collected from various sources such as Institute of Advanced Research, Indian National Trust for Art and Cultural Heritage and other associated agencies.

== Objectives ==
- Documenting and creating publicly accessible database about geographical feature such as built heritage and sites for dissemination of public information to planners, researchers, students and individuals interested in such information.
- Documenting information in a uniform format about all antiquities whether recorded or collected by the federal or state governments, private and public museums, libraries, and universities.
- Promoting awareness aims to sensitize people to the benefits of preserving antiquities and historic sites significantly associated with the historical records.
- Extending facility and providing accommodation to the affiliated state departments, local bodies, communities, NGOs, universities, and museums.
- Developing relations as part of one of its principles that involve Archaeological Survey of India, state and union territory agencies or academic departments and non-government organizations in building public relation for better data management.

== Monitoring committee ==
It is headed by the government of India, however its activities are monitored by the Archaeological Survey of India's administration. The Secretary to the Ministry of Culture, is appointed as the chairperson while ASI's director general acts as a vice-chairperson. ASI's additional director general serves as its members.
