= Victor Pachon =

French physiologist

Michel Victor Pachon (May 26, 1867 – 1938) was a French physiologist born in Clermont-Ferrand.

In 1892 he earned his doctorate at the University of Paris, and later became a chief assistant in Paris to physiologists Charles Richet (1850-1935) and Eugène Gley (1857–1930). In 1911 he became a professor of physiology at the medical faculty of the University of Bordeaux. Today, this institution is named "Faculte de médecine Victor Pachon" in his honor.

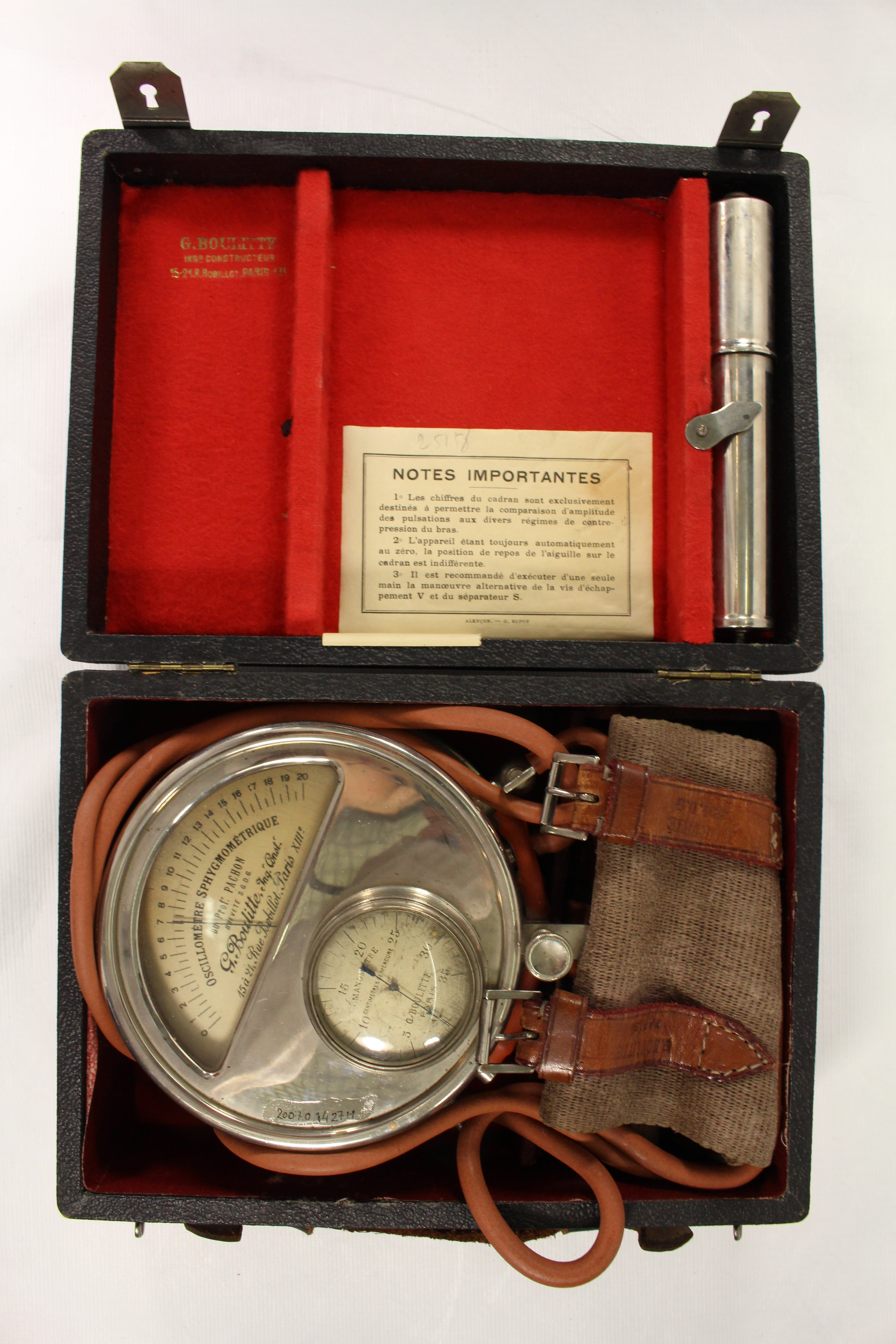
Sphygmographic oscillometer of Pachon

Pachon is remembered for his work involving blood pressure and oscillometry; which is defined as the measurement of oscillations used in cardiovascular and respiratory physiology. In 1909 Pachon developed a sphygmographic oscillometer for measuring arterial blood pressure. Pachon's oscillometer was widely used by doctors and technicians during the first half of the twentieth century.

== Publications by Pachon that have been translated into English ==
- "The measurement of the systolic & diastolic arterial pressure with Pachon's sphygmometric oscillometer". 1912.
- "Clinical investigation of cardiovascular function", 1934.

== See also ==
- Sphygmomanometer
