= DD Kisan =

Indian state-owned agriculture Television channel

- Type: Television Channel
- Country: India
- Broadcast area: India
- Network: Doordarshan
- Headquarters: Noida, India

Programming
- Language: Hindi
- Picture format: 1080i HDTV (downscaled to 576i for the SDTV feed)

Ownership
- Owner: Prasar Bharati, Ministry of Information and Broadcasting
- Sister channels: DD National; DD News; DD India; DD Sports; DD Bharati; DD Retro

History
- Launched: May 26, 2015; 11 years ago

Links
- Website: DD Kisan

Availability

Terrestrial
- DVB-T2 (India): Check local frequencies

Streaming media
- YouTube: Official Channel

DD Kisan is an Indian state-owned agriculture television channel, founded by the Government of India, owned by the Ministry of Information and Broadcasting. It is the flagship channel of Doordarshan was launched on 26 May 2015. The channel is dedicated to agriculture and related sectors, which disseminates real-time inputs to farmers on new farming techniques, water conservation and organic farming among other information.

== History ==
Ahead of 2014 Indian general election, the BJP had declared that if they come in power they would try setting up a dedicated channel for Indian Farmers. The public broadcaster Prasar Bharti which currently runs the Krishi Darshan program on Doordarshan is one of the longest running programmes on DD National. It was launched on 26 January 1967.

DD Kisan have introduced two AI anchors named AI Bhumi and AI Krish that can speak 50 Indian and foreign languages on its 9th anniversary. "These news anchors are computer, which are like human, or rather they can work like a human. They can read news 24 hours and 365 days without stopping or getting tired", said the agricultural ministry in a statement while introducing DD Kisan's new look and new style.

== Shows ==
- 2021 - Hum Kisi Se Kam Nahi written by Tanveer Alam
- 2015 - Wah Chaudhary Directed by Vierendrra Lalit and produced by JV Manisha Bajaj and Tarsem Antil (Harikrit Films)
