= Chair (academic department) =

Academic department in Poland, Russia and the Czech Republic

Chair (Latin: cathedra, Greek: kathedra "seat", Polish: katedra) is an equivalent of an academic department in Poland, Russia and the Czech Republic, a division of a university or school faculty devoted to a particular academic discipline. Originally, a cathedra is the chair or throne of a bishop, a symbol of the bishop's teaching authority in the Roman Catholic Church.

== In Poland ==
University organisation in Poland comprises the following units:

University (Uniwersytet)

Faculty (Wydział)

Institute (Instytut)

Chair (Katedra)

Department (Zakład)

Research group (Pracownia, Zespół)

Usually degree programmes are conducted within the framework of institutes. However, some specialised programmes may be conducted by independent chairs, while programmes with large variety of disciplines involved (especially medical and legal studies) may be conducted directly by a faculty—in this case, faculty may be composed of chairs with no institutes in its structure. Interdepartmental individual programmes exist at some universities, where a programme of studies is agreed individually with student's supervisor and courses from various faculties, institutes and chairs are available.

== In the Czech Republic ==
Katedras were introduced in Czechoslovakia in 1950 as a result of the centralization of higher education under the influence of the system of higher education in the Soviet Union. In 1990, after the collapse of communism, the academic self-government was restored and institutions made the decisions about their structure themselves.
