= Academic department =

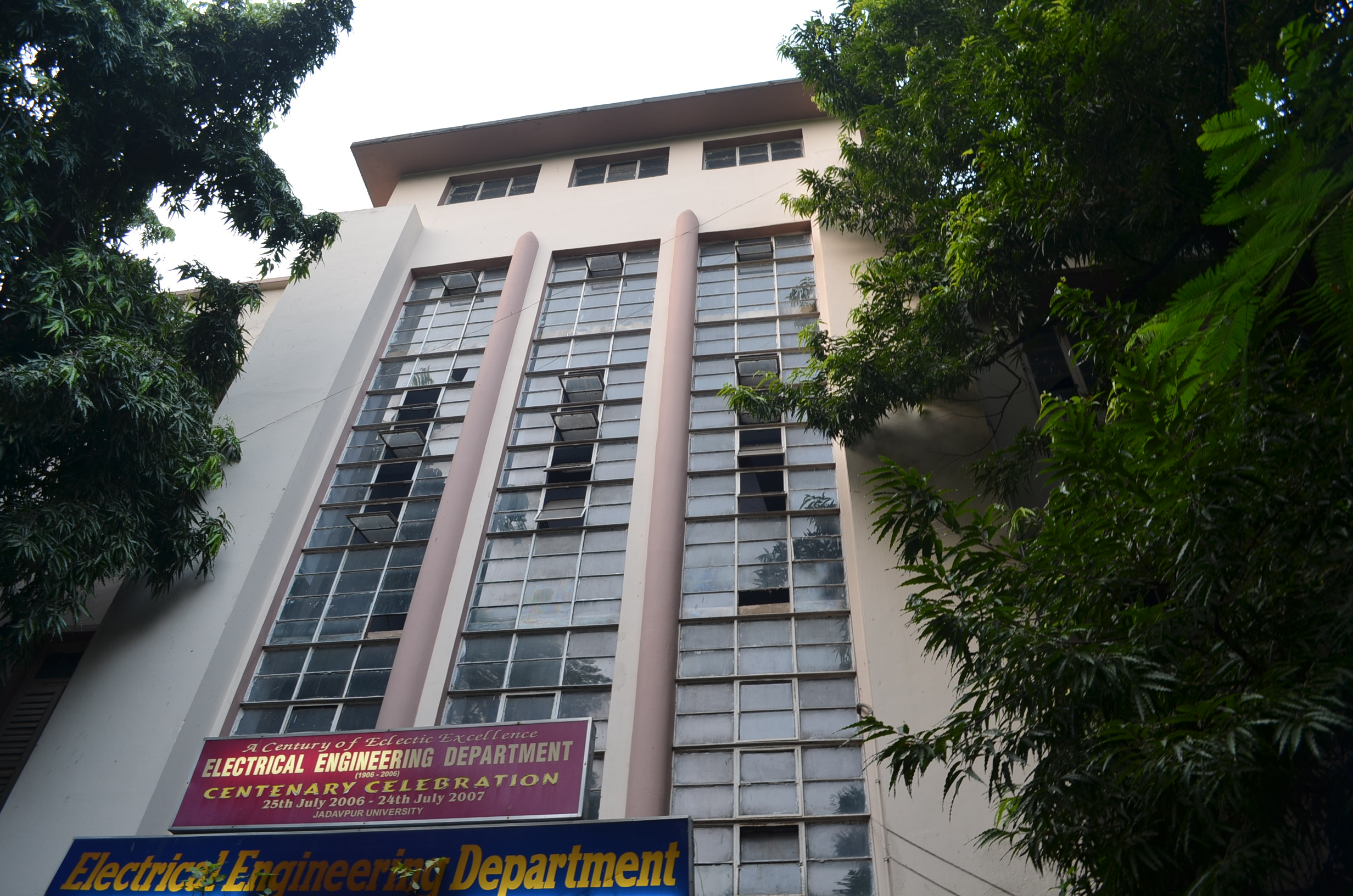
The Department of Electrical Engineering at Jadavpur University in Kolkata, India

An academic department is a unit within a university or school faculty devoted to a particular academic discipline. In the United Kingdom and other Commonwealth countries, universities tend to use the term faculty; faculties are typically further divided into schools or departments, but not always.

== Disciplines ==
The organization of faculties into departments is not standardized, but most U.S. universities will at least have departments of History, Physics, English (language and literature), Psychology, and so on. Sometimes divisions are coarser: a liberal arts college which de-emphasizes the sciences may have a single Science department; an engineering university may have one department for Language and Literature (in all languages). Sometimes divisions may be finer: for example, Harvard University has separate departments of Organismic and Evolutionary Biology, Molecular and Cellular Biology, and Chemistry and Chemical Biology. Some disciplines are found in different departments at different institutions: biochemistry may be in biology, in chemistry or in its own department; computer science may be in mathematics, applied mathematics, electrical engineering, or its own department (the usual case nowadays). Typically, "Departments reflect disciplines with the disciplines representing coherent areas of research and scholarship."

Departments in professional schools, or more so, professional schools at the postgraduate level will be specialized like the school itself, so a medical school will probably have departments of Anatomy, Pathology, Dermatology, and so on.

== Structure ==
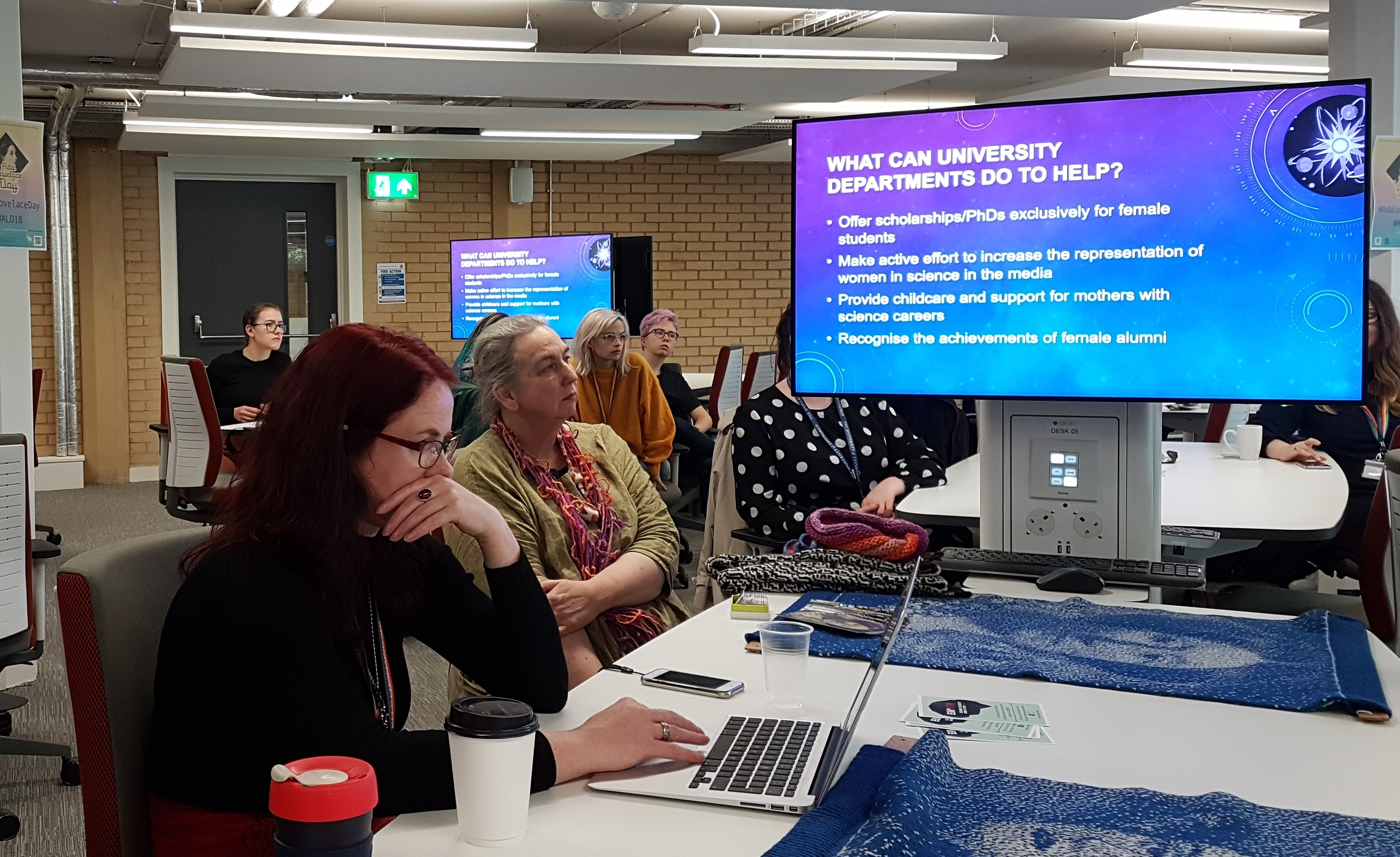
A computer screen reading "What can university departments do to help?" at the University of Edinburgh in Scotland

=== Chairs and faculty ===
"Departments serve as administrative structures." Departments are generally chaired by a member of the department, who may be elected by the faculty of the department, appointed by the dean of the faculty, or assigned by simple rotation among the tenured faculty. The duties, importance, and power of the department chair vary widely among institutions and even among departments within an institution.

Responsibilities and themes of a department leader or head may include:

- Recruitment and retention
- Ensuring good internal relations and coordination between staff
- Research
- Educational reform
- Trust and collaboration

=== Curricula ===
"Programs [in Departments or outwith] reflect how disciplines (or combinations of disciplines) form curriculum to teach their disciplines or combinations/intersections of disciplines."

Courses belong to programs and are generally given within a department, and often named for the department, e.g. Physics 230: Quantum mechanics.

=== Undergraduate students ===
Undergraduate academic majors or degree programs are generally administered by departments, although there may also be interdisciplinary committees for subjects which touch more than one department.

Per Umbrach and Porter (2002), several aspects of academic departments can affect the performance of students within them. Higher proportions of female undergrads, as well as deeper focuses on research (as measured by grant money per full-time employee) tend to increase student satisfaction with their majors. The two variables also tend to increase students' perception of how much their skills developed overall. (Decomposing this into intellectual and personal development, more patterns appear. Intellectually, only grant money appears to substantially increase skill development. Personally, gender diversity and student contact with faculty are also positive factors; average SAT score, however, can be a negative factor.)

=== Graduate students ===
Graduate students in academic (as opposed to professional) programs are much more closely tied to their departments than undergraduates, and the department, rather than the university, is almost completely responsible for their selection (cf. college admissions) and course of study.

== Alternatives ==
Some institutions without conventional academic departments include the University of Wisconsin at Green Bay, the University of California, Santa Cruz, and the Evergreen State College.

== See also ==
- Academic major
- Chair (Polish academic department)
- List of academic disciplines
