= 2018 in the United States =

- Decades: 1990s; 2000s; 2010s; 2020s; 2030s
- See also: History of the United States (2016–present); Timeline of United States history (2010–present); List of years in the United States

This is a list of events in the year 2018 in the United States.

== Incumbents ==
=== Federal government ===
- President: Donald Trump (R-New York)
- Vice President: Mike Pence (R-Indiana)
- Chief Justice: John Roberts (Maryland)
- Speaker of the House of Representatives: Paul Ryan (R-Wisconsin)
- Senate Majority Leader: Mitch McConnell (R-Kentucky)
- Congress: 115th

==== State governments ====
Governors and lieutenant governors

=== Governors ===
- Governor of Alabama: Kay Ivey (Republican)
- Governor of Alaska: Bill Walker (Independent) (until December 3), Mike Dunleavy (Republican) (starting December 3)
- Governor of Arizona: Doug Ducey (Republican)
- Governor of Arkansas: Asa Hutchinson (Republican)
- Governor of California: Jerry Brown (Democratic)
- Governor of Colorado: John Hickenlooper (Democratic)
- Governor of Connecticut: Dannel Malloy (Democratic)
- Governor of Delaware: John Carney (Democratic)
- Governor of Florida: Rick Scott (Republican)
- Governor of Georgia: Nathan Deal (Republican)
- Governor of Hawaii: David Ige (Democratic)
- Governor of Idaho: Butch Otter (Republican)
- Governor of Illinois: Bruce Rauner (Republican)
- Governor of Indiana: Eric Holcomb (Republican)
- Governor of Iowa: Kim Reynolds (Republican)
- Governor of Kansas: Sam Brownback (Republican) (until January 31), Jeff Colyer (Republican) (starting January 31)
- Governor of Kentucky: Matt Bevin (Republican)
- Governor of Louisiana: John Bel Edwards (Democratic)
- Governor of Maine: Paul LePage (Republican)
- Governor of Maryland: Larry Hogan (Republican)
- Governor of Massachusetts: Charlie Baker (Republican)
- Governor of Michigan: Rick Snyder (Republican)
- Governor of Minnesota: Mark Dayton (Democratic)
- Governor of Mississippi: Phil Bryant (Republican)
- Governor of Missouri: Eric Greitens (Republican) (until June 1), Mike Parson (Republican) (starting June 1)
- Governor of Montana: Steve Bullock (Democratic)
- Governor of Nebraska: Pete Ricketts (Republican)
- Governor of Nevada: Brian Sandoval (Republican)
- Governor of New Hampshire: Chris Sununu (Republican)
- Governor of New Jersey: Chris Christie (Republican) (until January 16), Phil Murphy (Democratic) (starting January 16)
- Governor of New Mexico: Susana Martinez (Republican)
- Governor of New York: Andrew Cuomo (Democratic)
- Governor of North Carolina: Roy Cooper (Democratic)
- Governor of North Dakota: Doug Burgum (Republican)
- Governor of Ohio: John Kasich (Republican)
- Governor of Oklahoma: Mary Fallin (Republican)
- Governor of Oregon: Kate Brown (Democratic)
- Governor of Pennsylvania: Tom Wolf (Democratic)
- Governor of Rhode Island: Gina Raimondo (Democratic)
- Governor of South Carolina: Henry McMaster (Republican)
- Governor of South Dakota: Dennis Daugaard (Republican)
- Governor of Tennessee: Bill Haslam (Republican)
- Governor of Texas: Greg Abbott (Republican)
- Governor of Utah: Gary Herbert (Republican)
- Governor of Vermont: Phil Scott (Republican)
- Governor of Virginia: Terry McAuliffe (Democratic) (until January 13), Ralph Northam (Democratic) (starting January 13)
- Governor of Washington: Jay Inslee (Democratic)
- Governor of West Virginia: Jim Justice (Republican)
- Governor of Wisconsin: Scott Walker (Republican)
- Governor of Wyoming: Matt Mead (Republican)

=== Lieutenant governors ===
- Lieutenant Governor of Alabama: vacant
- Lieutenant Governor of Alaska:
  - until October 16: Byron Mallott (Democratic)
  - October 16 – December 3: Valerie Davidson (Independent)
  - starting December 3: Kevin Meyer (Republican)
- Lieutenant Governor of Arkansas: Tim Griffin (Republican)
- Lieutenant Governor of California: Gavin Newsom (Democratic)
- Lieutenant Governor of Colorado: Donna Lynne (Democratic)
- Lieutenant Governor of Connecticut: Nancy Wyman (Democratic)
- Lieutenant Governor of Delaware: Bethany Hall-Long (Democratic)
- Lieutenant Governor of Florida: Carlos Lopez-Cantera (Republican)
- Lieutenant Governor of Georgia: Casey Cagle (Republican)
- Lieutenant Governor of Hawaii: Shan Tsutsui (Democratic)
  - until January 31: Shan Tsutsui (Democratic)
  - January 31 – February 2: vacant
  - February 2 – December 3: Doug Chin (Democratic)
  - starting December 3: Josh Green (Democratic)
- Lieutenant Governor of Idaho: Brad Little (Republican)
- Lieutenant Governor of Illinois: Evelyn Sanguinetti (Republican)
- Lieutenant Governor of Indiana: Suzanne Crouch (Republican)
- Lieutenant Governor of Iowa: vacant
- Lieutenant Governor of Kansas: Jeff Colyer (Republican) (until January 31), vacant (January 31 – February 14), Tracey Mann (Republican) (starting February 14)
- Lieutenant Governor of Kentucky: Jenean Hampton (Republican)
- Lieutenant Governor of Louisiana: Billy Nungesser (Republican)
- Lieutenant Governor of Maryland: Boyd Rutherford (Republican)
- Lieutenant Governor of Massachusetts: Karyn Polito (Republican)
- Lieutenant Governor of Michigan: Brian Calley (Republican)
- Lieutenant Governor of Minnesota: Tina Smith (Democratic) (until January 2), Michelle Fischbach (Republican) (starting January 3)
- Lieutenant Governor of Mississippi: Tate Reeves (Republican)
- Lieutenant Governor of Missouri:
  - until June 1: Mike Parson (Republican)
  - June 1 – 18: vacant
  - starting June 18: Mike Kehoe (Republican)
- Lieutenant Governor of Montana: Mike Cooney (Democratic)
- Lieutenant Governor of Nebraska: Mike Foley (Republican)
- Lieutenant Governor of Nevada: Mark Hutchison (Republican)
- Lieutenant Governor of New Jersey: Kim Guadagno (Republican) (until January 16), Sheila Oliver (Democratic) (starting January 16)
- Lieutenant Governor of New Mexico: John Sanchez (Republican)
- Lieutenant Governor of New York: Kathy Hochul (Democratic)
- Lieutenant Governor of North Carolina: Dan Forest (Republican)
- Lieutenant Governor of North Dakota: Brent Sanford (Republican)
- Lieutenant Governor of Ohio: Mary Taylor (Republican)
- Lieutenant Governor of Oklahoma: Todd Lamb (Republican)
- Lieutenant Governor of Pennsylvania: Mike Stack (Democratic)
- Lieutenant Governor of Rhode Island: Daniel McKee (Democratic)
- Lieutenant Governor of South Carolina: Kevin L. Bryant (Republican)
- Lieutenant Governor of South Dakota: Matt Michels (Republican)
- Lieutenant Governor of Tennessee: Randy McNally (Republican)
- Lieutenant Governor of Texas: Dan Patrick (Republican)
- Lieutenant Governor of Utah: Spencer Cox (Republican)
- Lieutenant Governor of Vermont: David Zuckerman (Progressive)
- Lieutenant Governor of Virginia: Ralph Northam (Democratic) (until January 13), Justin Fairfax (Democratic) (starting January 13)
- Lieutenant Governor of Washington: Cyrus Habib (Democratic)
- Lieutenant Governor of Wisconsin: Rebecca Kleefisch (Republican)

== Events ==
=== January ===
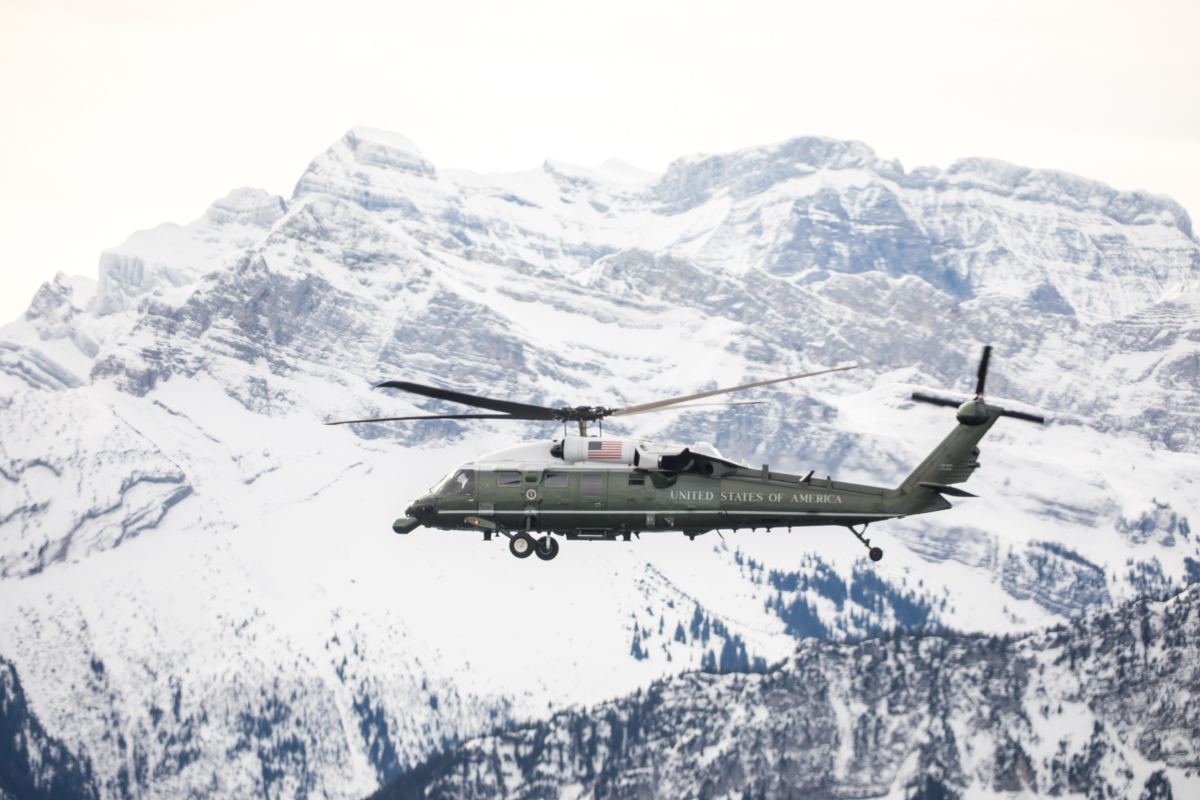
President Donald J. Trump arrives at Zurich Airport Thursday, January 25, 2018, in Zurich, Switzerland, and proceeds to Marine One traveling to Davos, Switzerland over the Swiss Alps.

- January 1
  - The 2018 North American cold wave takes place, with record low temperatures in the Midwestern and Eastern United States. Times Square in New York City has a temperature of 9 °F (−13 °C), with −4 °F (−20 °C) wind chill, in addition to Omaha having a temperature of −15 °F (−26 °C) on December 30, 2017, lower than the previous record set in 1884.
  - Retail sale of marijuana begins in California, the largest U.S. state to allow the sale of marijuana for recreational use.
- January 3 – President Donald Trump boasts on Twitter that his nuclear button is "much bigger" and "more powerful" than North Korean leader Kim Jong-un's.
- January 6 – The 2017–18 United States flu season causes dozens of deaths.
- January 8 – The National Oceanic and Atmospheric Administration reports that 2017 was the costliest year on record for climate and weather-related disasters in the United States.
- January 9 – The 2018 Southern California landslides occur, killing at least 13 people, and injuring 25. The main damage occurs in Montecito, California, which was nearly burned by the Thomas Fire a month prior.
- January 10 – The city council of Washington, D.C., renames the street outside Russia's embassy after Boris Nemtsov, an opposition politician and critic of Vladimir Putin who was shot dead outside the Kremlin.
- January 11 – During a meeting with lawmakers about immigration, President Trump is reported to have asked, "Why are we having all these people from shithole countries come here?"His remarks are condemned as "racist" and "shocking" by a UN spokesman. (comp. Donald Trump racial views) The government of Botswana demands a clarification, and Ambassador Earl R. Miller is asked if the USDS regards Botswana as a "shithole" country. The event is termed by many media outlets "Shitholegate".
- January 12 – A Baltimore woman who was a patient at the University of Maryland Medical Center is taken outside and left by hospital employees in freezing temperatures wearing nothing but her hospital gown and socks. She is stranded until bystander Imanu Baraka calls 911.
- January 13 – The Hawaii Emergency Management Agency sends a false alarm warning of an incoming ballistic missile attack, causing widespread panic across the state.
- January 15 – Turpin case: Police in California arrest a couple, 57-year-old computer engineer at Northrop Grumman David Allen Turpin and his wife, 49-year-old Louise Anna Turpin, who allegedly held their 13 children captive, some chained to beds in the dark.
- January 16
  - Democrat Patty Schachtner wins the special election for Wisconsin's 10th Senate District, the same district President Trump won by 17 points.
  - A meteor is reported near Michigan that causes a magnitude 2.0 earthquake.
- January 18 – Scotland Yard reveals that U.S. actor Kevin Spacey is being investigated over a third accusation of sexual assault in the UK, from 2005.
- January 20 – Senate Democrats block a bill that would have kept the government running until mid-February and the government shutdown of January 2018 begins.
- January 22
  - Amazon opens the first Amazon Go store to the public, the first completely cashier-less grocery store, located in Seattle.
  - Minnie Mouse receives a star on the Hollywood Walk of Fame in recognition of her 90th anniversary.
- January 23 – A tsunami alert is triggered after an 8.0-magnitude earthquake is recorded off the southern Alaskan coast.
- January 24
  - Disgraced Olympic gymnastics team doctor Larry Nassar receives a prison sentence of up to 175 years after testimony from nearly 160 of his victims.
  - President Trump attends the World Economic Forum at Davos in Switzerland.
- January 30 – President Trump gives his first official State of the Union Address. 75 percent of State of the Union viewers approved of Trump's address.

=== February ===
- February 2 – President Trump approves the release of a controversial Republican memo accusing the FBI of abusing its powers during the inquiry into alleged Russian meddling of US elections.
- February 4 – The Philadelphia Eagles win their first Super Bowl in franchise history by defeating the New England Patriots, 41–33, in Super Bowl LII, ending a 57-year championship drought.
- February 5 – The Dow Jones share index closes down 4.6%, its biggest drop since the 2008 financial crisis.
- February 6 – SpaceX successfully launches its Falcon Heavy rocket from LC39A at John F. Kennedy Space Center.
- February 9–25 – The United States compete at the Winter Olympics in Pyeongchang, South Korea and win 9 gold, 8 silver, and 6 bronze medals.
- February 14 – A mass shooting occurs at Marjory Stoneman Douglas High School in Parkland, Florida, resulting in 17 fatalities. It is the deadliest high school shooting in the United States, surpassing the 1999 Columbine High School massacre.
- February 15 – Pearl Fernandez pleads guilty to the murder of her son Gabriel Fernandez, an eight-year old tortured and killed in California. Her boyfriend Isauro Aguirre is also later convicted of murder in relation to the case.
- February 16
  - Special Counsel Robert Mueller announces that 13 Russians have been charged with interfering in the 2016 presidential election.
  - Black Panther, directed by Ryan Coogler, is released by Marvel Studios as the 18th film of the Marvel Cinematic Universe (MCU). It becomes the second-highest-grossing film of 2018 and the ninth highest-grossing film of all time at that point (now the thirteenth), earning $1.347 billion during its run.
- February 18 – In Stock Car racing, Austin Dillon wins the 60th running of the Daytona 500. Darrell Wallace Jr. finishes 2nd highest finish for an African-American in the Daytona 500.
- February 22 – Teachers and other education personnel in West Virginia go on the first ever statewide strike in state history.
- February 23
  - President Trump announces a plan for the largest ever package of sanctions against North Korea, aimed at cutting off revenue for its nuclear program.
  - President Trump's former deputy campaign manager, Rick Gates, admits charges of conspiracy and lying to investigators in a plea deal.
- February 24 – Paul Manafort is indicted with five federal criminal charges including money laundering and foreign lobbying violations.
- February 25 – In the wake of concerns about gun control, a number of major companies announce they are severing ties with the National Rifle Association of America (NRA) – including Alamo, Allied Van Lines, Avis Rent a Car, Budget Rent a Car, Delta, Enterprise, First National Bank of Omaha, Hertz, Met Life, National, SimpliSafe, Symantec, Teladoc, and United.

=== March ===
- March 1 – President Trump announces tariffs of 25% on steel and 10% on aluminium imports.
- March 4 – The 90th Academy Awards, hosted by Jimmy Kimmel, are held at Dolby Theatre in Hollywood, with Guillermo del Toro's The Shape of Water winning four awards out of 13 nominations, including Best Picture and Best Director. Frances McDormand and Sam Rockwell respectively win Best Actress and Best Supporting Actor for Three Billboards Outside Ebbing, Missouri, Gary Oldman wins Best Actor for Darkest Hour and Allison Janney wins Best Supporting Actress for I, Tonya. The telecast garners 26.5 million viewers, at that point the least-watched televised ceremony in Oscar history.
- March 5 – Ohio Attorney General Mike DeWine sues agricultural giant Monsanto, alleging the company concealed dangers posed by a toxic chemical compound it manufactured for nearly a half century.
- March 6 – Gary Cohn, a top economic adviser to President Trump, resigns his position.
- March 7
  - Stormy Daniels, an adult film actress who alleges she had an affair with President Trump, files a lawsuit against him alleging that a nondisclosure contract she signed is invalid.
  - Florida passes a law by 67–50 votes to raise the age to buy a gun from 18 to 21 after the Marjory Stoneman Douglas High School shooting.
- March 9
  - President Trump accepts an invite from Kim Jong-un through South Korean officials for a meeting by May.
  - Former drug firm executive Martin Shkreli is sentenced to seven years in federal prison for defrauding investors.
- March 13 – Secretary of State Rex Tillerson is fired (effective March 31) by President Trump. CIA Director Mike Pompeo is nominated to replace him.
- March 14
  - Democrat Conor Lamb wins the 2018 special Congressional election in Pennsylvania's 18th congressional district, previously considered a safe seat for Republicans.
  - The Senate passes, by 67 to 31, a bill to reform the Dodd–Frank Wall Street Reform and Consumer Protection Act, a set of post-2008 financial crisis rules.
  - President Trump appoints Larry Kudlow to be Director of the National Economic Council, succeeding Gary Cohn.
- March 15 – A pedestrian bridge collapses at Florida International University, resulting in 6 fatalities.
- March 16
  - Former FBI deputy director Andrew McCabe is dismissed for "lack of candor" days before he was due to retire with pension rights. McCabe denies the claims and insists he was targeted because of his involvement in the Russia inquiry.
  - Facebook suspends Cambridge Analytica, a data firm accused of mishandling Facebook user profiles.
  - In the NCAA Tournament, the UMBC Retrievers defeat the Virginia Cavaliers, 74–54, becoming the first 16th-seed in NCAA Division I men's basketball tournament history to defeat a 1-seed.
- March 19
  - Uber suspends all of its self-driving cars worldwide after a woman is killed by one of the vehicles in Tempe, Arizona.
  - British TV station, Channel 4, airs a documentary about Cambridge Analytica, the data analysis company that worked for Donald Trump's presidential campaign. Undercover reporters, talking to executives from the firm, discover the use of bribes, honey traps, fake news campaigns and operations with ex-spies to swing election campaigns around the world.
  - California residents are ordered to evacuate ahead of a storm described as an "atmospheric river".
- March 20 – Facebook founder Mark Zuckerberg receives a formal request from the British government to answer questions regarding Cambridge Analytica and the "catastrophic failure of process" behind the data breach.
- March 21 – It is reported that the Opioid epidemic may be worse than previously thought due to omissions on death certificates.
- March 22
  - President Trump announces tariffs on up to $60bn in Chinese goods and plans to limit the country's investment in the US. The Dow Jones falls sharply in response.
  - President Trump replaces his National Security Adviser H. R. McMaster with former United Nations ambassador John Bolton.
- March 25 – Advocates warn that Congress needs to devote more money to address the growing opioid epidemic.
- March 26
  - Six children are killed by their adoptive mothers, Jennifer and Sarah Hart, when their SUV intentionally drives over a California cliff in a mass murder-suicide. Both perpetrators were known to have abused their six children before the crash.
  - President Trump orders the expulsion of 60 Russian diplomats following the ex-spy poisoning case in the UK.
- March 28 – At least 12 states are reported to be suing the Trump administration over inclusion of a citizenship question on the 2020 census.
- March 29
  - Russia announces it will expel 60 US diplomats and close the US Consulate in St. Petersburg in retaliation for the US expelling 60 Russian diplomats.
  - President Trump nominates Ronny Jackson, current physician to the President, to replace Veterans Affairs Secretary David Shulkin.
  - Mark Zuckerberg disavows a 2016 memo on Facebook's expansion plans, saying in a statement that Andrew Bosworth "is a talented leader who says many provocative things. This was one that most people at Facebook including myself disagreed with strongly. We've never believed the ends justify the means."

=== April ===
- April 3 – Three people suffer gunshot wounds when a female shooter, Nasim Najafi Aghdam, attacks the YouTube headquarters in California, before killing herself.
- April 4
  - China announces 25% tariffs on 106 US Products, including cars and soybeans.
  - Thousands of people gather in Memphis, Tennessee, to mark the 50th anniversary of the assassination of Martin Luther King Jr.
- April 6 – The Trump administration imposes sanctions on seven Russian oligarchs and 17 senior government officials, accusing them of "malign activity around the globe".
- April 9 – The FBI raids the home, office and hotel room of President Trump's long-time lawyer, Michael Cohen, pursuant to a federal search warrant.
- April 10 – Facebook founder and CEO Mark Zuckerberg is questioned in a joint session of several US senate committees, after the revelation that 87 million people had their private information accessed by Cambridge Analytica.
- April 11 – House of Representatives Speaker Paul Ryan announces that he will not run for re-election in November.
- April 13 – President Trump orders targeted strikes in Syria to retaliate for a suspected chemical weapons attack.
- April 17 – Southwest Airlines Flight 1380, a Boeing 737-700 suffers an engine failure at cruise altitude, debris enters the fuselage causing substantial damage to the aircraft and loss of cabin pressure and diverts at Philadelphia International Airport. One passenger dies and seven are injured.
- April 18 – Coffee chain Starbucks is the subject of racism accusations when two black men are arrested at its Philadelphia store after asking to use a restroom reserved for paying customers.
- April 19 – Jim Bridenstine is confirmed as the next NASA administrator.
- April 20 – Smallville actress Allison Mack appears in court on charges of sex trafficking, sex trafficking conspiracy and forced labor conspiracy.
- April 22 – Four people are killed at a Waffle House restaurant in Nashville, Tennessee, when a naked gunman, Travis Reinking, shoots them with a semi-automatic rifle before fleeing on foot. The gunman is captured the next day after a manhunt and James Shaw Jr. propelled to national fame as a hero after disarming the armed aggressor and saving others in the restaurant.
- April 23 – French President Emmanuel Macron arrives in the U.S. for a three-day visit, during which he meets President Trump and makes a speech to Congress.
- April 24 – Joseph James DeAngelo, a suspect in the Golden State Killer case, is apprehended after law enforcement matched his DNA to the serial rapist and murderer.
- April 26
  - TV star Bill Cosby is found guilty of three counts of aggravated indecent assault.
  - CIA Director Mike Pompeo is confirmed as Secretary of State by the Senate.
  - Veteran TV anchor Tom Brokaw is accused of sexual harassment by a former NBC News anchor.
- April 27 – Avengers: Infinity War, directed by the Russo brothers, is released by Marvel Studios as the 19th film of the Marvel Cinematic Universe (MCU) and the sequel to 2012's The Avengers and 2015's Avengers: Age of Ultron. It becomes the highest-grossing film of 2018 and the fourth-highest-grossing film of all time at that point (now the fifth), earning $2.048 billion as the fourth film to cross $2 billion. The film is also one of the most expensive of all time (unadjusted for inflation).

=== May ===
- May 1 – A study conducted by health services company Cigna reveals that American adults are experiencing a "loneliness epidemic" with nearly half of Americans reporting they sometimes or always feel alone (46 percent) or left out (47 percent).
- May 2
  - The state of Iowa approves the so-called "heartbeat" bill, banning most abortions once a fetal heartbeat is detected.
  - A C-130 military plane crash in Savannah, Georgia kills nine people.
  - Following a series of small earthquakes, the USGS warns that the Kīlauea volcano in Hawaii could erupt. Two days later it erupts, there are stronger earthquakes and Hawaii declares a state of emergency, evacuating 1,700 residents.
- May 4
  - The national unemployment rate hits 3.9 percent, the lowest rate since 2000.
  - The Trump administration announces an end to the special Temporary Protected Status program for 57,000 Hondurans.
- May 5
  - NASA's InSight spacecraft, designed to study the interior and subsurface of Mars, successfully launches at 11:05 UTC, with an expected arrival on November 26, 2018.
  - The state of California becomes the world's fifth-largest economy, with the state's GDP surpassing that of the United Kingdom's.
  - In horse racing, pre-race favorite Justify wins the 144th running of the Kentucky Derby, becoming the first horse since 1882 to win the race while unraced as a two-year-old. The race was run under the wettest conditions in its history; by post time, more than 2.8 inches (7.1 cm) of rain had fallen on race day, breaking a record that had lasted since 1918.
- May 8
  - The Senate Intelligence Committee releases an unclassified version of its investigation into Russian cyberattacks in 2016, concluding: "Russian-affiliated cyber actors were able to gain access to restricted elements of election infrastructure. [...] In a small number of states, these cyber actors were in a position to, at a minimum, alter or delete voter registration data; however, they did not appear to be in a position to manipulate individual votes or aggregate vote totals."
  - New York's attorney general Eric Schneiderman resigns over multiple allegations of assault.
  - President Trump announces his intention to withdraw the United States from the Iranian nuclear agreement. In a statement, former U.S. President Barack Obama calls the move "a serious mistake".
  - The National Centers for Environmental Information reports that April 2018 was the coldest month in the U.S. since 1997.
- May 9 – The California Energy Commission introduces its 2019 Building Energy Efficiency Standards, requiring all new homes to be fitted with solar power from 2020. It is the first state in the US to enact such a law.
- May 10
  - At around 2 a.m. local, President Trump ceremoniously greets three freed Korean-Americans, who were detained by North Korea for more than a year for "anti-state activities", on Joint Base Andrews in Maryland.
  - NASA's Carbon Monitoring System (CMS) is cancelled by the Trump administration.
- May 11 – U.S. fighter jets intercept two Russian TU-95 bombers in Alaskan airspace.
- May 16 – President Trump meets with Shavkat Mirziyoyev.
- May 17 – The Kīlauea shield volcano on the Big Island of the state of Hawaii erupts from its summit, shooting ash 30,000 feet (9,100 m) into the sky.
- May 18 – A school shooting takes place at Santa Fe High School in Santa Fe, Texas. Eight students and two teachers are killed and thirteen other people are injured.
- May 20 – U.S. Treasury Secretary Steven Mnuchin states that the Trump administration will put its proposed tariffs on Chinese imports "on hold", averting fears of a trade war between the two countries.
- May 21 – The Supreme Court, in a 5–4 ruling, upholds a law preventing employees from filing class action lawsuits against their employers over pay and hour disputes.
- May 23 – It is reported that Donald Trump's personal lawyer, Michael Cohen, received a secret payment of at least $400,000 to fix talks between the Ukrainian president and President Trump.
- May 24 – Actor Morgan Freeman is accused of sexual harassment by eight women.
- May 25 – Harvey Weinstein is charged with rape and several other counts of sexual abuse involving two separate women after turning himself in to police in New York City.
- May 28 – The Center for the Study of the Drone at New York's Bard College estimates that just over 900 law enforcement agencies, fire departments, and emergency services across the country are now using drones, no longer seen as a novelty by officials.
- May 29
  - ABC TV cancels comedian Roseanne Barr's show after she tweets a racist comment, likening Valerie Jarrett to an ape.
  - Missouri Governor Eric Greitens announces his resignation (effective June 1) amid a sex scandal.
  - Starbucks temporarily closes its stores for one day to undergo racial sensitivity training following an incident in April in which two black men were arrested in its Philadelphia store.
- May 30
  - By a majority of 23–12, the California State Senate votes to approve a bill that would reinstate the net neutrality regulations repealed by the Federal Communications Commission in December.
  - The FDA approves the first artificial iris.
- May 31 – The Trump administration announces that it will extend its tariffs on imported steel (25%) and aluminium (10%) to include the EU, Mexico and Canada, starting at midnight.

=== June ===
- June 4 – In a 7–2 decision (Masterpiece Cakeshop v. Colorado Civil Rights Commission), the Supreme Court rules in favor of a Colorado baker who, citing the First Amendment's protection of religion, refused to create a customized wedding cake for a homosexual couple.
- June 7 – The Washington Capitals defeat the Vegas Golden Knights in game five of the 2018 Stanley Cup Final to give the Capitals their first Stanley Cup in franchise history and the first championship for the city of D.C. since the Redskins won Super Bowl XXVI. Capitals left-winger Alex Ovechkin is the playoff MVP.
- June 8
  - The U.S. Department of Energy's Oak Ridge National Laboratory unveils Summit as the world's most powerful supercomputer, with a peak performance of 200,000 trillion calculations per second, or 200 petaflops.
  - Celebrity chef Anthony Bourdain and fashion designer Kate Spade both die of suicide, leading to growing concerns of alarming public health that can lead to people living with breakdowns and mental health before asking others if can have any intention on taking their own lives.
  - The Golden State Warriors defeat the Cleveland Cavaliers, four games to none, to win the NBA Championship.
- June 8–9 – At the G7 summit in Canada, President Trump pushes for the reinstatement of the G8 (to include Russia). He also proposes the elimination of tariffs.
- June 11–12 – In a historic first, President Trump meets with Supreme Leader of North Korea, Kim Jong-un, in Singapore.
- June 14 – The Sand Blaster roller coaster on the Daytona Beach boardwalk derails. Six people are taken to hospital, with two suffering traumatic injuries.
- June 15
  - Federal judge Amy Berman Jackson cancels Paul Manafort's bail and orders that he be jailed for alleged witness tampering.
  - Pixar Animation Studios' 20th feature film, Incredibles 2, the sequel to 2004's The Incredibles, is released in theaters. It is currently Pixar's biggest financial success, grossing over $1.242 billion worldwide.
- June 17 – A shooting at an all-night arts festival in Trenton, New Jersey, leaves one person dead and seventeen people injured.
- June 18
  - 70 former U.S. Attorneys deliver a letter to Jeff Sessions, urging that he end his "dangerous, expensive, zero tolerance" migrant policy, which separates children at the border, calling it "inconsistent with the values of the institution in which we served."
  - Rapper XXXTentacion is shot and killed in Deerfield Beach, FL on the same day fellow rapper Jimmy Wopo is also shot and killed in his hometown of Pittsburgh.
- June 19
  - The United States announces that it will withdraw from the United Nations Human Rights Council.
  - Koko, a western Lowland gorilla largely known for having learned to communicate in American Sign Language, dies in her sleep in California.
  - Antwon Rose Jr. a 17-year-old African-American man is shot and killed by white Pittsburgh police officer Michael Rosfeld.
- June 25
  - Motorcycle manufacturer Harley-Davidson announces that it will shift some production outside the U.S. as a result of retaliatory tariffs introduced by the European Union.
  - Epidiolex, for the treatment of epilepsy, becomes the first drug derived from marijuana to win federal approval.
- June 26 – The Supreme Court upholds President Trump's travel ban in a 5–4 decision.
- June 27
  - In a landmark 5–4 decision that overturns Abood v. Detroit Board of Education (1977), the Supreme Court rules in Janus v. AFSCME that it is a violation of the First Amendment for public-sector unions to compel non-members to pay fair-share representation fees.
  - Associate Justice Anthony Kennedy announces that he will retire from the United States Supreme Court on July 31, prompting Senate Majority Leader Mitch McConnell to vow that Kennedy's successor will be confirmed by the fall.
- June 28
  - The 2018 North American heat wave begins.
  - 575 women protesting U.S. Immigration and Customs Enforcement are arrested during a demonstration outside the Hart Senate Office Building in Washington, D.C.
  - Five people are killed in a mass shooting in the newsroom of The Capital newspaper in Annapolis, Maryland.
  - Mass arrests of Occupy ICE demonstrators are made by Homeland Security agents at an ICE facility in Portland, Oregon.
- June 30
  - Hundreds of thousands of people demonstrate across all 50 U.S. states against family separations carried out by the United States.
  - A 30-year-old man stabs nine people at an apartment complex in Boise, Idaho.

=== July ===
- July 5 – Scott Pruitt resigns as the Administrator of the Environmental Protection Agency, effective July 6. He is replaced by Andrew Wheeler.
- July 6
  - U.S. tariffs on $34 billion of Chinese goods come into effect, as President Trump suggests the final total could reach $550bn. China accuses the U.S. of starting the "largest trade war in economic history" and announces immediate retaliatory tariffs.
  - Ant-Man and the Wasp, directed by Peyton Reed, is released by Marvel Studios as the 20th film of the Marvel Cinematic Universe (MCU) and the sequel to 2015's Ant-Man.
- July 9 – President Trump nominates Brett Kavanaugh, a circuit judge of the United States Court of Appeals for the District of Columbia Circuit, to become an Associate Justice for the Supreme Court of the United States.
- July 11 – President Trump attends the NATO Summit in Brussels.
- July 12 – President Trump arrives in the UK. The four-day visit includes talks with Theresa May, tea with the Queen and a trip to Scotland. There are mass protests in London, featuring a 'Trump baby' blimp flown over Westminster.
- July 13 – Special counsel Mueller charges 12 Russian intelligence officers with hacking during the 2016 election.
- July 16 – President Trump meets with Russian President Vladimir Putin for private talks in the Finnish capital Helsinki. In a press conference afterwards, Trump praises Russia and Putin, drawing sharp criticism from both Republicans and Democrats alike. Senator John McCain describes it as "one of the most disgraceful performances by an American president in memory."
- July 18 – In an interview with CBS News, President Trump says he holds Putin personally responsible for interference in the 2016 US election; a sharp contrast to his earlier comments in Helsinki.
- July 19
  - The Trump administration proposes limiting habitat protections for endangered species.
  - 17 people die after an amphibious "duck boat" capsizes while carrying 31 tourists on Table Rock Lake, Missouri.
  - President Trump invites Vladimir Putin to visit America.
- July 20 – The New York Times reports that President Trump's former lawyer Michael Cohen secretly recorded his client discussing payments to Karen McDougal, a former Playboy model who says she had an affair with Trump.
- July 26
  - Tesfaye Cooper is convicted of hate crime and aggravated kidnapping charges in Illinois and sentenced to seven years in prison for his role in the 2017 Chicago torture incident. He is the fourth and final member of an African-American group to be convicted in relation to the kidnapping of a mentally disabled white man in Chicago who livestreamed their torture of him on Facebook, shouting "Fuck Trump" and "Fuck white people" while doing so.
  - The share price of Facebook drops by almost 20 percent after the company warns investors that user growth has slowed following the Cambridge Analytica data leak scandal. More than $109bn is wiped from its market value, the biggest stock market loss in corporate history, which includes a $14.5bn personal loss for founder Mark Zuckerberg.
  - Michael Avenatti, the attorney for porn star Stormy Daniels, claims he is representing three other women who were allegedly paid by Donald Trump, AMI and Michael Cohen to keep quiet.
- July 28 – John Delaney announces his candidacy for U.S. president in 2020.
- July 29 – Wildfires in northern California continue to rage across vast swathes of land, destroying hundreds of structures and causing several deaths.

=== August ===
- August 1 – President Trump calls for the Russia investigation to end "right now", urging Attorney General Jeff Sessions to halt the inquiry into alleged election meddling, while accusing special counsel Robert Mueller of being "totally conflicted".
- August 2
  - The U.S. Department of Commerce proceeds with applying revised tariffs on Canadian newsprint.
  - Apple, Inc. becomes the first public company to achieve a market capitalization of $1 trillion, as its share price exceeds a new record high above $207.
- August 5 – President Trump admits that his eldest son, Donald Trump Jr., attended a meeting at Trump Tower during the 2016 election campaign "to get information on an opponent," but insists it was "totally legal and done all the time in politics – and it went nowhere. I did not know about it!"
- August 6 – The ongoing wildfires in California are officially declared as the largest in the state's history.
- August 7
  - The U.S. reimposes sanctions on Iran.
  - Harvard University has four Black women faculty deans for the first time in history: Michelle Ann Williams (School of Public Health), Tomiko Brown-Nagin (Radcliffe Institute for Advance Study), Bridget Terry Long (Graduate School of Education), and Claudine Gay (Faculty of Arts and Sciences).
- August 8 – Missouri voters vote against the right-to-work law by 67% to 33%.
- August 10
  - In a landmark case, Monsanto is ordered to pay $289m to 46-year-old Dewayne Johnson, after a jury rules that the company's Roundup weedkiller caused his terminal cancer and that the corporation failed to warn him of the health hazards.
  - A Horizon Air Bombardier Dash 8 Q400 is stolen from Seattle–Tacoma International Airport with no passengers on board, prompting F15 fighter jets to scramble and intercept. After being contacted by Seattle/Tacoma air traffic control, the plane crashes near Ketron Island in Pierce County, Washington, killing the 29-year-old male pilot.
  - The Democratic National Committee reverses its ban on accepting donations from the fossil fuel industry.
- August 12
  - NASA launches the Parker Solar Probe to study the Sun at close range and the solar wind.
  - The Unite the Right 2 rally is held at Lafayette Square near the White House in Washington, D.C.. Organized by Jason Kessler to mark the anniversary of the 2017 Unite the Right rally in Charlottesville, Virginia, which ended in violence, the rally attracts some 20 to 30 of Kessler's supporters and thousands of counter-demonstrators amid a heavy police presence.
- August 14 – Nebraska executes Carey Dean Moore, who was convicted of murder, in the state's first execution for 21 years and the first by lethal injection.
- August 15 – Former CIA Director John O. Brennan, an outspoken critic of Trump, has his security clearance revoked by the President. The move is criticized as political retribution for Brennan's comments.
- August 19 – The Last Sharknado: It's About Time airs for the first time on Syfy.
- August 21
  - Police in Iowa announce they have found a body in Poweshiek County during their investigation into the Disappearance of Mollie Tibbetts. They were led to the site by suspect Cristhian Bahena Rivera, an undocumented immigrant.
  - Michael Cohen, who worked as a lawyer for Donald Trump from 2006 until May 2018, pleads guilty to eight charges: five counts of tax evasion, one count of making false statements to a financial institution, one count of willfully causing an unlawful corporate contribution, and one count of making an excessive campaign contribution at the request of a candidate or campaign.
  - Paul Manafort, the former election campaign chairman for Trump, is convicted on eight out of eighteen charges of tax and bank fraud.
- August 22 – Mark Chapman, the man who shot and killed former Beatle John Lennon in 1980, is denied parole for the tenth time.
- August 23 – Intelligence specialist Reality Winner is sentenced to five years and three months in prison as part of a plea deal after pleading guilty to felony transmission of national defense information.
- August 25 – Arizona Senator John McCain dies at his home in Cornville, Arizona from glioblastoma, a rare aggressive form of brain cancer he had been battling for the past thirteen months at the time, four days before his 82nd birthday.
- August 26 – A mass shooting occurs during a Madden NFL 19 tournament at the Jacksonville Landing in Jacksonville, Florida, resulting in three fatalities including the perpetrator.
- August 28
  - California approves S.B. 100, a proposal to transition the state to 100% emissions-free electricity sources by 2045.
  - Shayna Hubers is convicted of the 2012 murder of her boyfriend Ryan Poston for a second time. Her previous conviction in relation to his fatal shooting had previously been overturned due to a member of the jury being ineligible.

=== September ===
- September 5
  - In an editorial in The New York Times, an unnamed senior Trump official writes that members of the administration are working to frustrate parts of the President's agenda to protect the country from his "worst inclinations". Trump responds by calling the anonymous writer "gutless" and the newspaper "phony".
  - Hurricane Florence becomes the first major hurricane of the 2018 Atlantic hurricane season.
- September 8 – The Cortlandt Street subway station reopens in Lower Manhattan, 17 years after it was destroyed by the 9/11 attacks.
- September 13 – Overpressured natural gas lines in the Merrimack Valley in Massachusetts cause a massive outbreak of explosions and fires in nearly 40 homes, killing one and injuring dozens.
- September 14 – Hurricane Florence makes landfall in North Carolina, with evacuation warnings in place for more than a million people.
- September 15 – NASA launches ICESat-2, the agency's most technologically advanced ice-monitoring spacecraft to date.
- September 16 – Christine Blasey Ford alleges that Supreme Court nominee Brett Kavanaugh sexually assaulted her in the early 1980s.
- September 22 – Christine Blasey Ford agrees to testify against Brett Kavanaugh the following week.
- September 23 – A second woman comes forward with sexual misconduct claims against Brett Kavanaugh.
- September 25 – TV star Bill Cosby, 81, is given a three to 10-year jail term for drugging and molesting a woman in 2004. Judge Steven O'Neill designates Cosby a "sexually violent predator", meaning he must undergo counselling for life and be listed on the sex offender registry.
- September 26 – A third woman accuses Brett Kavanaugh of sexual misconduct.
- September 27
  - Christine Blasey Ford appears before a Senate Judiciary Committee to give evidence against Brett Kavanaugh.
  - The Securities and Exchange Commission (SEC) files a suit in New York alleging securities fraud by Tesla CEO Elon Musk.

=== October ===
- October 2 – The Washington Post journalist Jamal Khashoggi is murdered inside the Saudi consulate in Istanbul, triggering a diplomatic crisis between the U.S. and Saudi Arabia.
- October 5 – A Star Is Born is theatrically released by Warner Bros. A remake of the 1934, 1957 and 1976 versions, it was a critical and commercial success, grossing over $436 million worldwide and receiving praise for the performances Bradley Cooper (who also directed), Lady Gaga and Sam Elliott as well as the screenplay, cinematography and music.
- October 6
  - The Senate confirms Brett Kavanaugh's Supreme Court nomination by a vote of 50–48, amid controversy over sexual assault claims against him.
  - Twenty people are killed in a crash involving a limousine transporting birthday party guests in Schoharie County, New York. It is the deadliest transport crash in the U.S. since Colgan Air Flight 3407, also in New York state, which claimed 50 lives in 2009.
- October 9 – America's ambassador to the UN, Nikki Haley, a senior Trump cabinet member, resigns unexpectedly.
- October 10 – Hurricane Michael approaches the Florida Panhandle, attaining peak wind speeds of 155 mph (250 km/h) and becoming the strongest hurricane to ever make landfall in that region.
- October 17 – After 50 years of performing the characters Big Bird and Oscar the Grouch, longtime Sesame Street puppeteer Caroll Spinney announces his retirement in 2015. Spinney's role was limited to voice only due to health problems.
- October 20 – President Trump announces that the US will "terminate" the Intermediate-Range Nuclear Forces Treaty over alleged Russian violations.
- October 24 – After a bomb was found at the home of George Soros in the suburbs of New York, suspected explosive devices are also sent to former US President Barack Obama and ex-Secretary of State Hillary Clinton. The latter devices are intercepted by technicians who screen mail sent to former US officials. The Time Warner building in New York (home to news broadcaster CNN) is also evacuated, after a package containing an explosive and suspicious powder is found addressed to former CIA Director John Brennan. Additional suspicious packages, addressed to Democratic Representative Maxine Waters and former Attorney General Eric Holder, are investigated by law enforcement.
- October 25 – A suspicious package is found in Tribeca, New York City, addressed to actor Robert De Niro. Authorities also find two packages in Delaware, addressed to former Vice President Joe Biden.
- October 26
  - Two more suspicious packages are found, addressed to New Jersey senator Cory Booker and the former director of national intelligence, James Clapper.
  - The perpetrator, Cesar Sayoc Jr., is captured in Plantation, Florida, in connection with the mail bombing attempts. He is questioned by FBI agents with the Joint Terrorism Task Force.
- October 27 – A mass shooting occurs at the Tree of Life synagogue in Pittsburgh, Pennsylvania, leaving 11 congregants dead. A 46-year-old male suspect is arrested and charged on making anti-semitic chants.
- October 28 – The Boston Red Sox defeat the Los Angeles Dodgers, four games to one, to win their ninth World Series Championship.
- October 29 – 800 U.S. soldiers are deployed to the Mexico–United States border as a part of Operation Faithful Patriot, reinforcing the border against incoming Central American migrant caravans.
- October 30
  - NASA announces that its Kepler space telescope mission has ended, with the telescope having run out of fuel two weeks before, after nine-and-a-half years in space. The telescope discovered 2,681 exoplanets, with a further 2,900 candidates at the time of its retirement. The spacecraft also discovered that there are more planets than stars in our galaxy.
  - The Supreme Court of Hawaii approves the resumption of construction on Mauna Kea of one of the world's biggest telescopes, the Thirty Meter Telescope, costing $1.4 billion. Some native Hawaiians, regarding the mountain as sacred, opposed the construction since 2015.

=== November ===
- November 2 – Bohemian Rhapsody, a biographical film about Queen singer Freddie Mercury, is released in theaters nationwide, becoming a major box office success, grossing over $905 million worldwide on a production budget of about $50 million, becoming the sixth-highest-grossing film of 2018 worldwide and setting the all-time box office records for the biopic and drama genres.
- November 6
  - Mid-term elections: The Democrats gain 40 seats to take control of the House of Representatives, but lose two seats in the Senate.
  - Gubernatorial elections: The Democrats gain seven new seats.
  - Michigan becomes the tenth state to legalize recreational marijuana.
- November 7
  - Attorney General Jeff Sessions tenders his resignation at President Trump's request.
  - 12 people and the perpetrator are killed in a shooting at the Borderline Bar and Grill, in Thousand Oaks, California, about 40 miles (65 km) north-west of Los Angeles.
- November 8
  - The White House shares apparently doctored footage posted by InfoWars, a conspiracy theory website, showing Jim Acosta making contact with a Trump aide, in a bid to justify its suspension of the CNN reporter's press pass.
  - Federal judge Brian Morris rules that the Keystone Pipeline cannot be built until a new Environmental impact assessment is completed. Four months later, on March 30, 2019, President Donald Trump issued a new permit.
- November 8–25 – Major wildfires in California, including the Woolsey in southern California and Camp to the north, leave 91 dead and at least 1,000 missing, with more than 250,000 residents forced to flee.
- November 21 – William Riley Gaul, an 18-year-old college football player murdered his ex-girlfriend Emma Walker in Knoxville, Tennessee.
- November 23 – Volume II of the Fourth National Climate Assessment (NCA4) is released.
- November 26 – SpongeBob SquarePants creator Stephen Hillenburg dies at the age of 57 from ALS.
- November 27 – Leah Walden is sentenced to 70 years in prison for the murder of Reese Bowman.
- November 29 – President Trump's former lawyer Michael Cohen pleads guilty to lying to Congress in relation to the Russia inquiry.
- November 30
  - Former President George H. W. Bush dies from Parkinson's disease at the age of 94 at his home in Houston, Texas. His passing was announced the next morning and at the time, he was both the nation's oldest and longest living president, a record surpassed by Jimmy Carter in 2019.
  - Anchorage is hit by a 7.0 magnitude earthquake.

=== December ===
- December 8 – The Atlanta United FC win their first MLS Cup in franchise history by defeating the Portland Timbers with the score 2–0, in MLS Cup 2018, since the team was founded in 2014.
- December 11 – The Balangiga bells, which had been taken by the United States Army from Balangiga, Eastern Samar in 1901 as war trophies during the Philippine–American War, are returned to the Philippines after 117 years of U.S. possession.
- December 12 – Michael Cohen, the ex-Trump lawyer who once said he'd "take a bullet" for the president, is given a 36-month jail term.
- December 13 – In a rare rebuke to the White House, the Senate votes 56–41 to end US military assistance to Saudi Arabia's intervention in Yemen over alleged war crimes. It passes a separate resolution that holds Saudi Crown Prince Mohammed bin Salman personally responsible for the death of Saudi dissident Jamal Kashoggi.
- December 14
  - Federal judge Reed O'Connor rules that the health insurance mandate component of the Affordable Care Act is unconstitutional.
  - Denise Williams is found guilty of the murder of her husband Jerry Michael Williams, who disappeared in December 2000 and was assumed to have accidentally drowned at Lake Seminole, Florida.
- December 18 – The Donald J. Trump Foundation is shut down, amid allegations that President Trump and others illegally misused its funds.
- December 20 – Defense Secretary Jim Mattis resigns, effective February 28, 2019, after failing to persuade Trump to reconsider his decision of the previous day to withdraw the remaining American troops from Syria.
- December 21
  - The Dow Jones closes at 22,445.37 after its worst week since 2008.
  - Aquaman, directed by James Wan, is released as the sixth film in the DC Extended Universe, becoming currently the franchise's biggest financial success.
- December 22
  - A partial shutdown of the government begins after Congress fails to agree a budget.
  - U.S. envoy Brett McGurk resigns over Trump's decision to pull troops from Syria.
- December 24 – Actor Kevin Spacey is charged with sexually assaulting a teenager at a bar in Massachusetts in July 2016 and ordered to appear in court on January 7.
- December 27 – An electrical fault at the Queens Con Edison power plant causes the night sky over New York City to briefly turn blue.
- December 31 – Senator Elizabeth Warren announces her intention to run for president in the 2020 election.

== Deaths ==
=== January ===
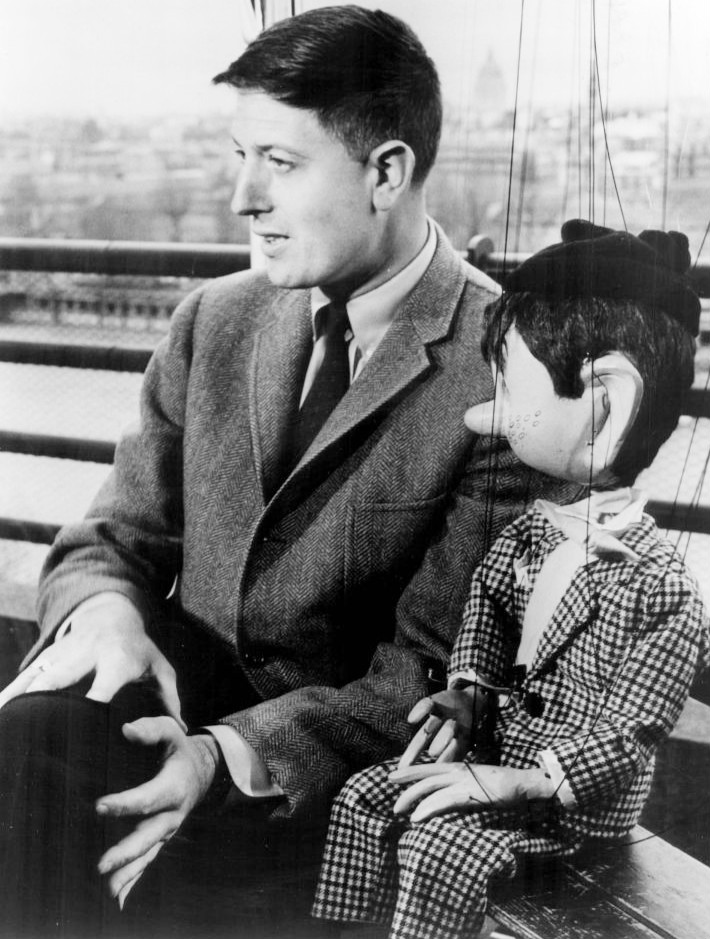
Frank Buxton

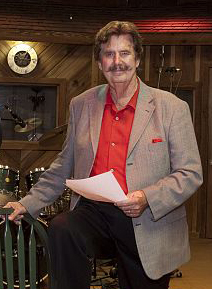
Rick Hall

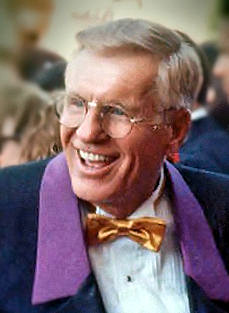
Jerry Van Dyke

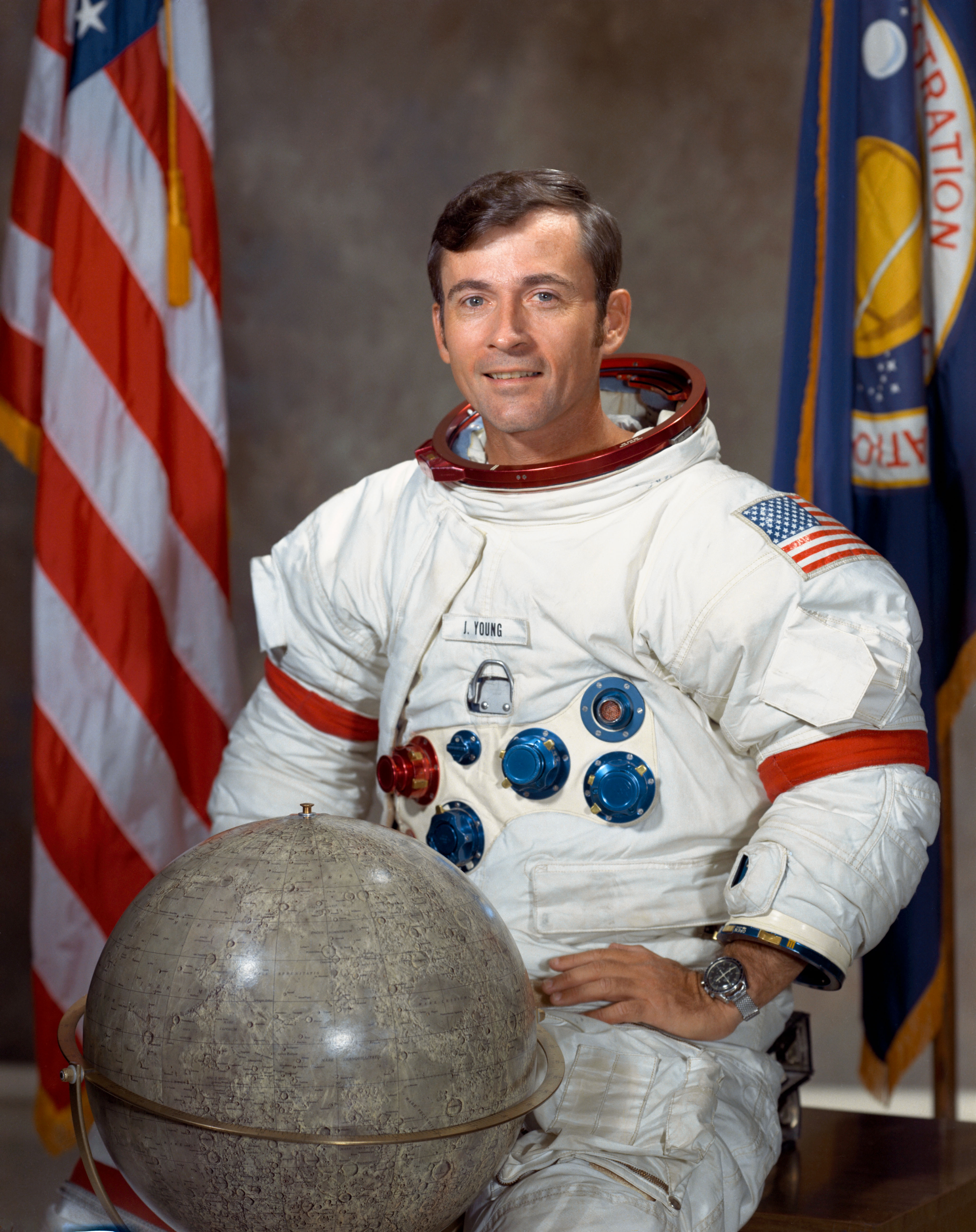
John W. Young

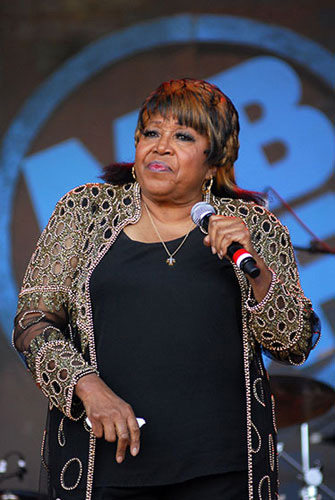
Denise LaSalle

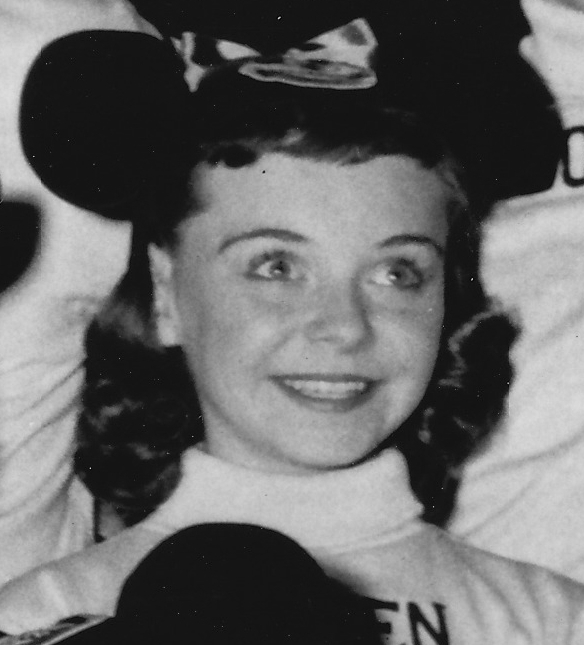
Doreen Tracey

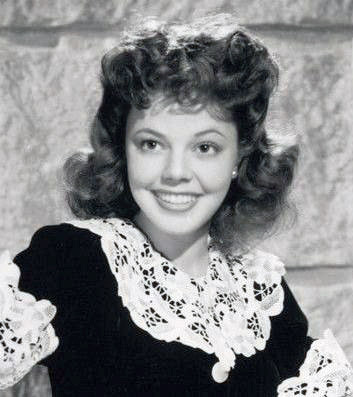
Jean Porter

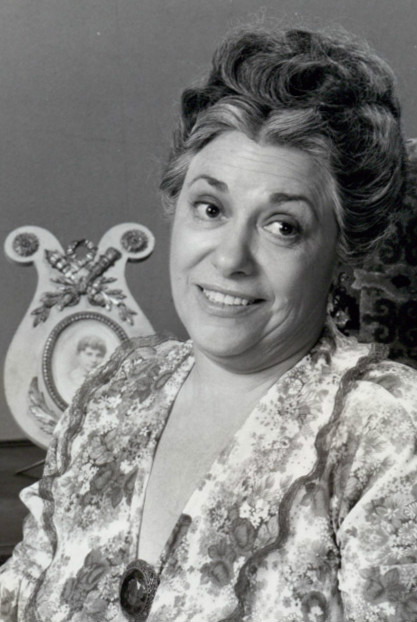
Naomi Stevens

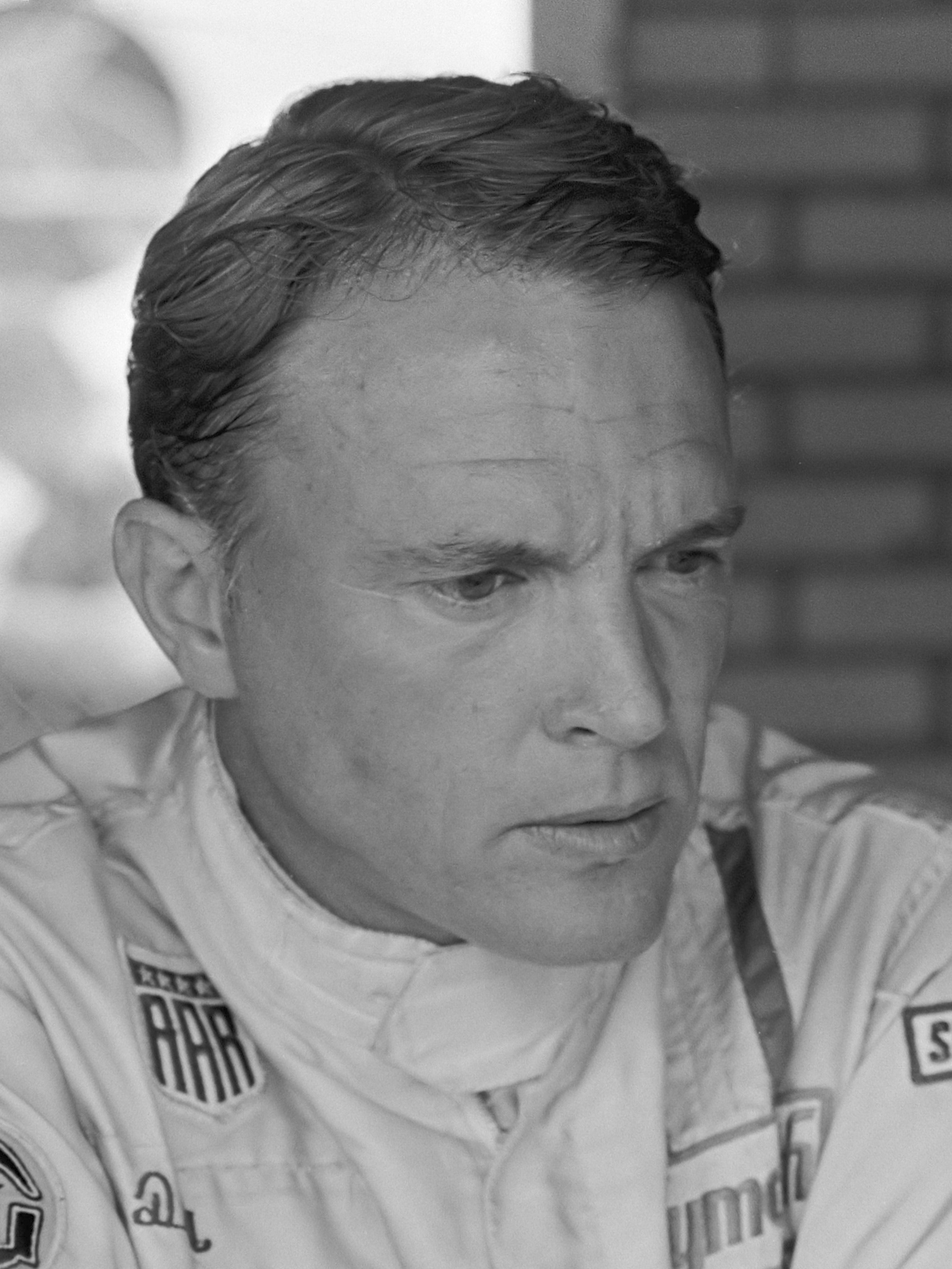
Dan Gurney

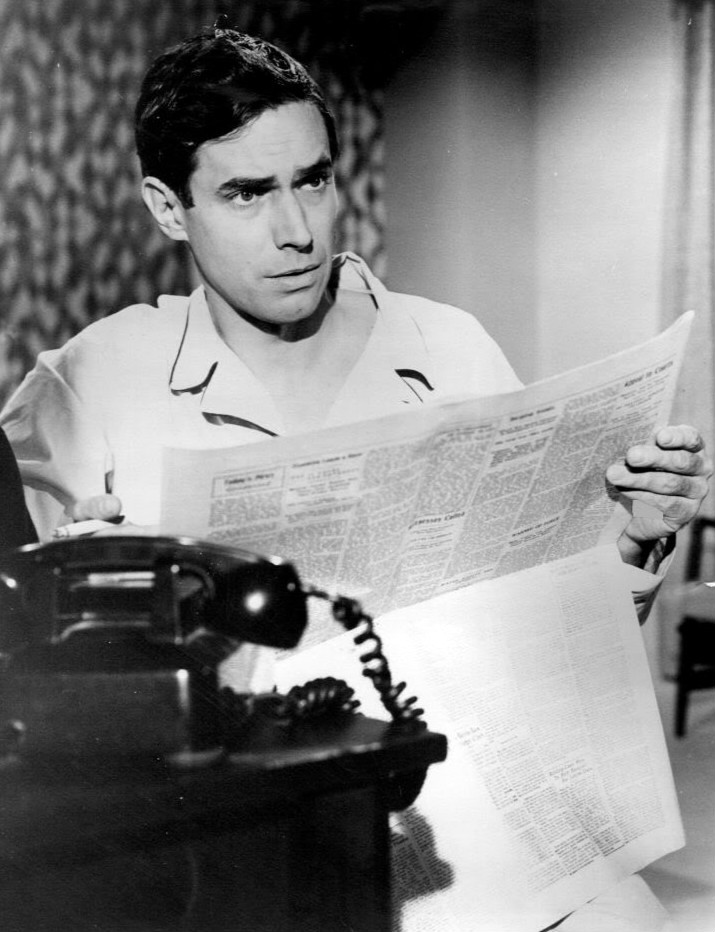
Bradford Dillman

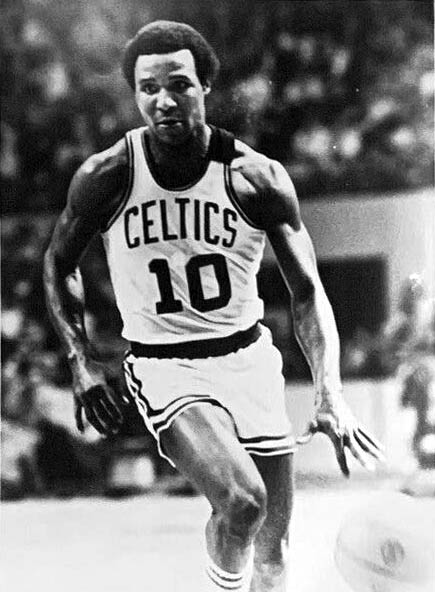
Jo Jo White

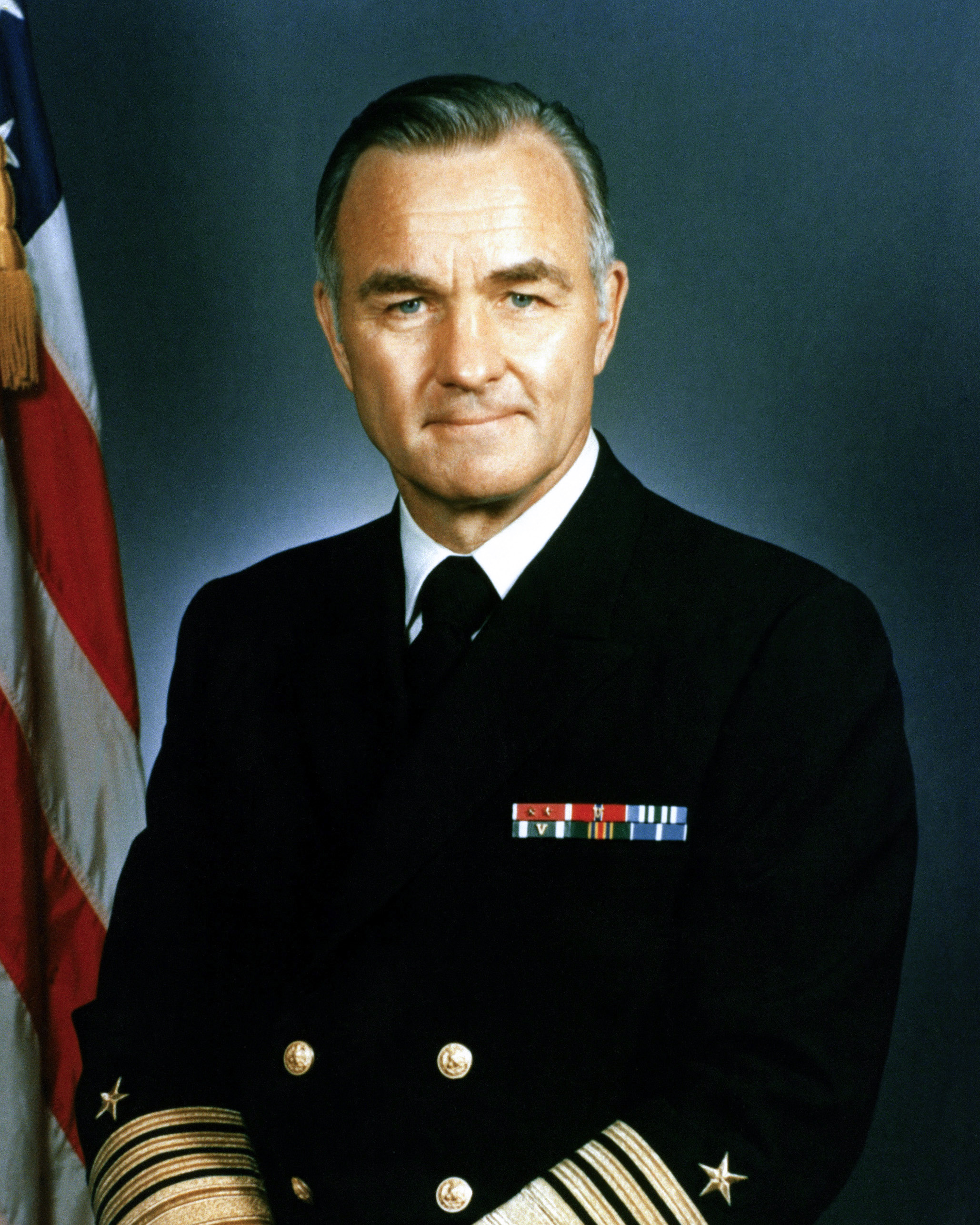
Stansfield Turner

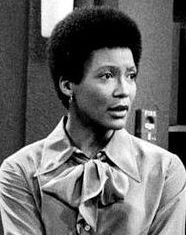
Olivia Cole

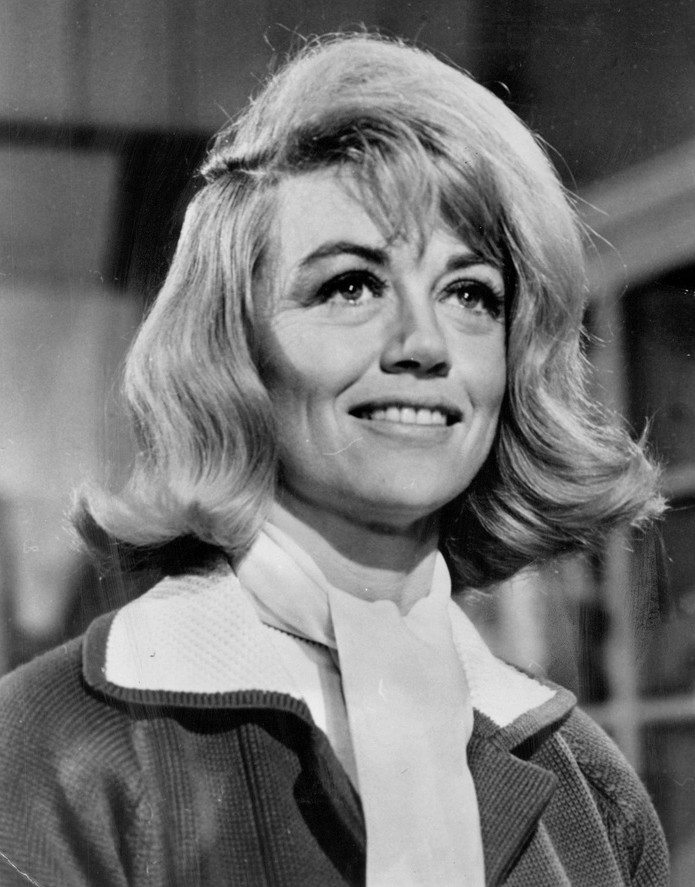
Dorothy Malone

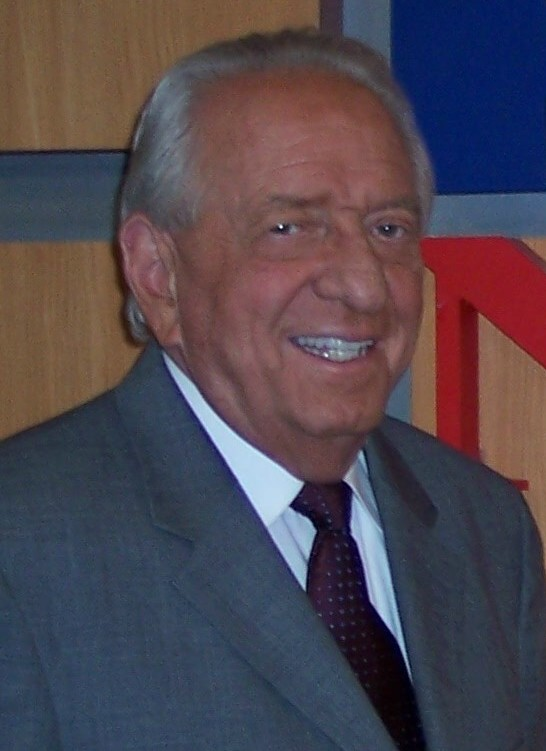
John Coleman

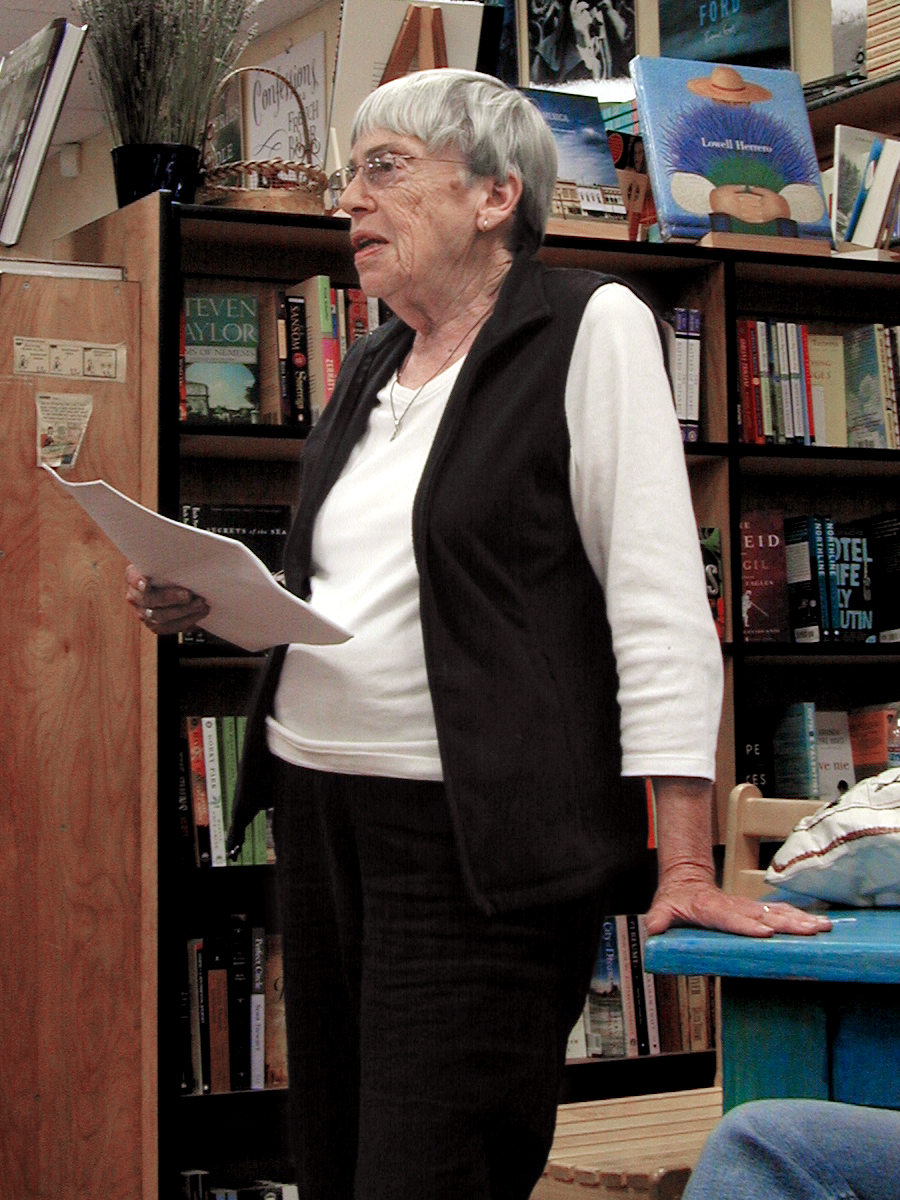
Ursula K. Le Guin

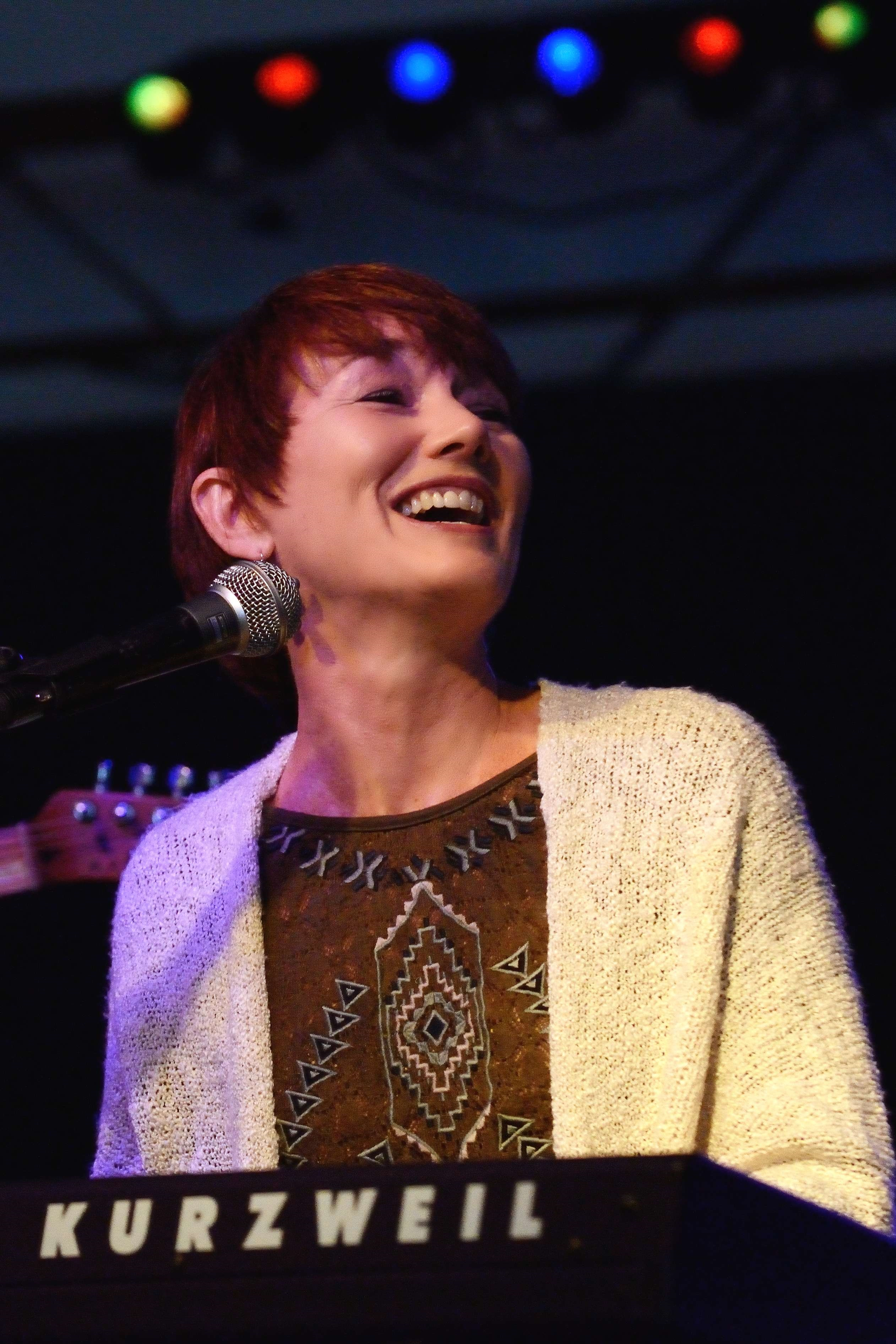
Lari White

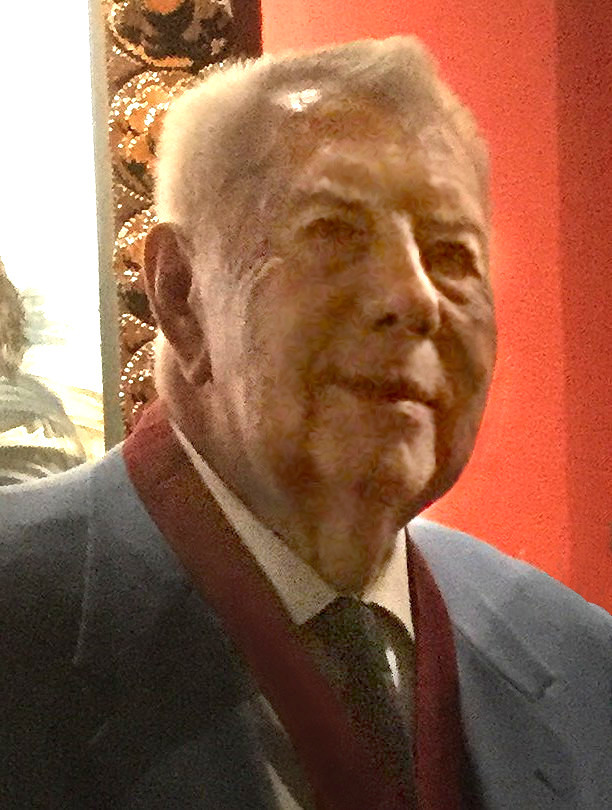
Mort Walker

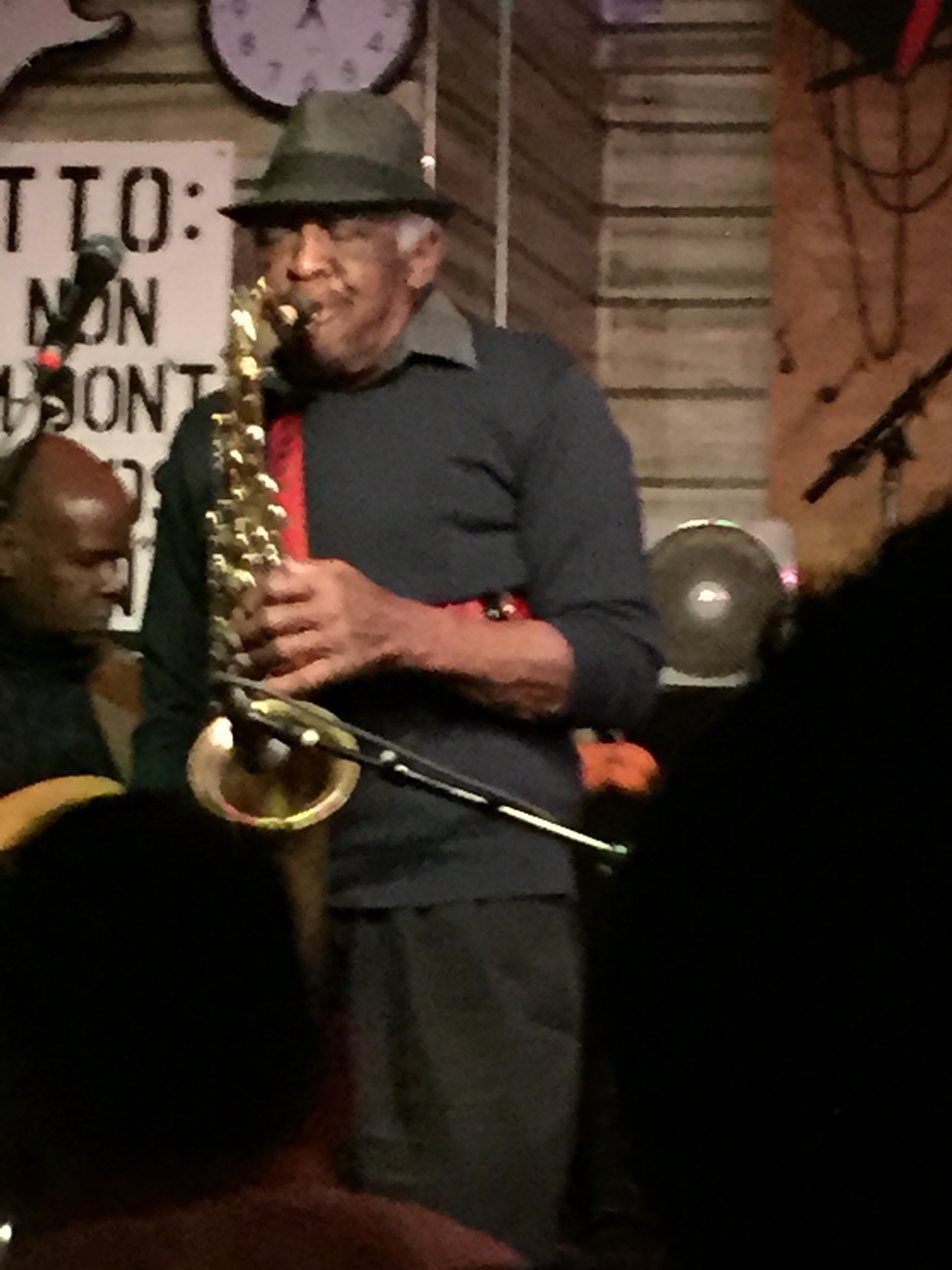
Eddie Shaw

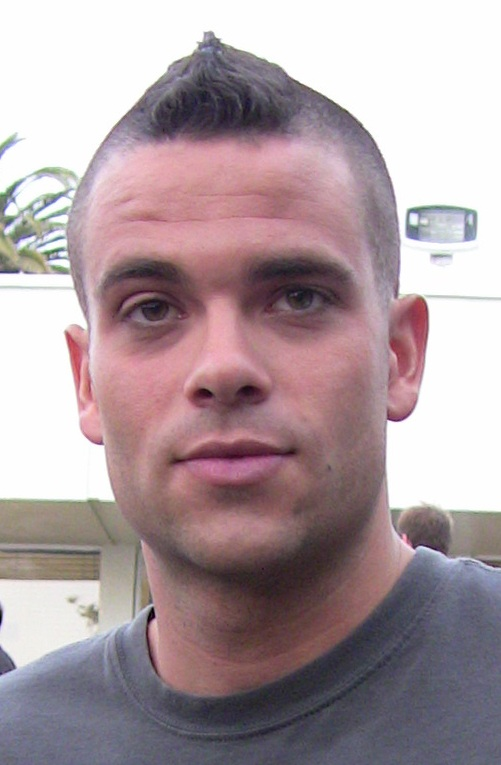
Mark Salling

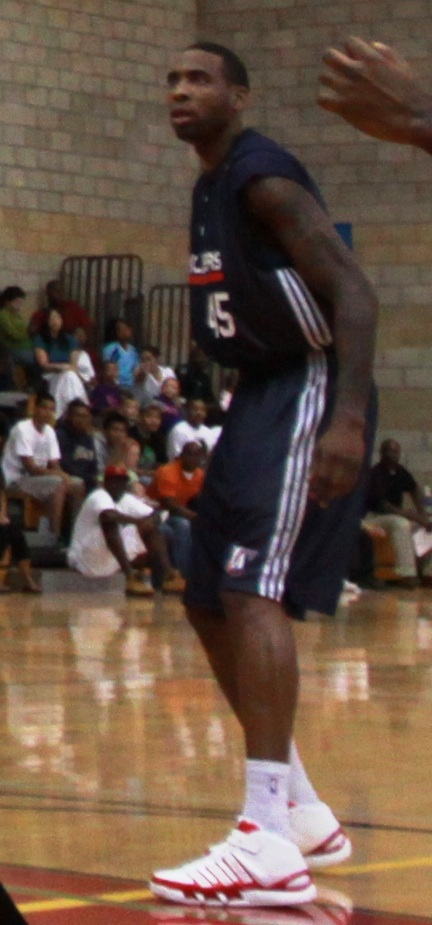
Rasual Butler

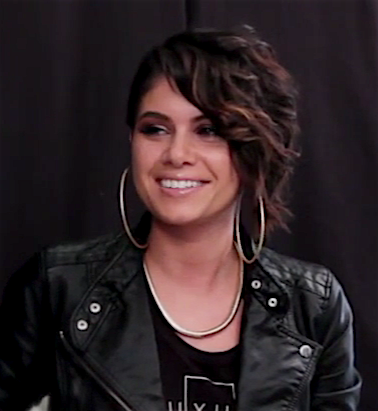
Leah LaBelle

- January 1
  - Robert Mann, violinist and composer (b. 1920)
  - Milton P. Rice, politician (b. 1920)
  - Jon Paul Steuer, actor and singer (b. 1984)
  - Betty Willis, soul singer (b. 1941)
- January 2
  - Frank Buxton, actor, writer, author, and director (b. 1930)
  - Emily Dole, professional wrestler (b. 1957)
  - Rick Hall, record producer, songwriter, and music publisher (b. 1932)
  - Thomas S. Monson, religious leader and writer (b. 1927)
  - Betty Woodman, ceramic artist and sculptor (b. 1930)
- January 3
  - Fred Bass, bookseller (Strand Bookstore) (b. 1928)
  - Heriberto Hermes, Roman Catholic prelate (b. 1933)
  - Rob Picciolo, baseball player and coach (b. 1953)
  - Alan Sagner, public servant and political fundraiser (b. 1920)
- January 4
  - Dick Bestwick, football coach (b. 1930)
  - Brendan Byrne, politician (b. 1924)
  - Gerard Conley, politician (b. 1929)
  - Carmen Cozza, baseball and football player, and coach (b. 1930)
  - Bruce Halle, auto parts executive and philanthropist, founder of Discount Tire (b. 1930)
  - Jack N. Merritt, army general (b. 1930)
- January 5
  - Robert Q. Crane, politician (b. 1926)
  - Carole Hart, television writer (b. 1943)
  - Norman Lamb, politician (b. 1935)
  - Jerry Van Dyke, actor (b. 1931)
  - John Young, astronaut (b. 1930)
- January 6
  - Horace Ashenfelter, Olympic athlete (b. 1923)
  - Thomas Bopp, astronomer (b. 1949)
  - Rita Crocker Clements, political organizer (b. 1931)
  - Marjorie Holt, politician (b. 1920)
  - Bob Jenson, politician (b. 1931)
  - William R. Ojala, politician (b. 1925)
  - Jimmy Robinson, recording engineer (b. 1950)
  - Dave Toschi, police detective (Zodiac Killer) (b. 1931)
  - Frank Varrichione, football player (b. 1932)
- January 7
  - Will Gay Bottje, composer (b. 1925)
  - Joe Ellis Brown, politician (b. 1933)
  - Tom Dowling, football coach (b. 1940)
  - Anna Mae Hays, military officer and nurse (b. 1920)
  - Tom Netherton, singer (b. 1947)
  - Dick Young, baseball player (b. 1927)
  - Doug Young, voice actor (b. 1919)
- January 8
  - Bruce Cole, humanist (b. 1938)
  - Frank Kreith, Austrian-born mechanical engineer (b. 1922)
  - Denise LaSalle, singer, songwriter, and record producer (b. 1934)
  - George Lindbeck, Lutheran theologian (b. 1923)
  - Kynaston McShine, curator (b. 1935)
  - James N. Morgan, economist (b. 1918)
  - Chuck Murphy, prelate (b. 1947)
  - Myron Rush, Kremlinologist (b. 1921)
  - Charles H. Turner, American attorney (b. 1935)
- January 9
  - Terence Marsh, British production designer (b. 1931)
  - Joseph Wayne Miller, actor (b. 1981)
  - Milton J. Rosenberg, psychology professor and radio host (b. 1925)
- January 10
  - Charles Davis, Olympic sports shooter (b. 1927)
  - John Sherrill Houser, artist (b. 1935)
  - William B. Keene, judge (b. 1925)
  - Katherine Kellgren, narrator and actress (b. 1969)
  - Tom Luken, politician (b. 1925)
  - Doreen Tracey, British-born American performer (b. 1943)
- January 11
  - Doug Barnard Jr., politician (b. 1922)
  - Gene Cole, athlete (b. 1928)
  - Stephane Gauger, Vietnamese-born film director and screenwriter (b. 1969)
  - Geoffrey C. Hazard Jr., lawyer (b. 1929)
  - John W. Hennessey Jr, academic (b. 1925)
  - Edgar Ray Killen, Ku Klux Klan leader and convicted murderer (b. 1925)
- January 12
  - Lisa Chedekel, journalist (b. 1960)
  - Frankie Muse Freeman, civil rights attorney (b. 1916)
  - Robert W. Hamilton, legal scholar (b. 1931)
  - Keith Jackson, sports commentator, journalist, author, and radio personality (b. 1928)
  - John V. Tunney, politician (b. 1934)
- January 13
  - Jean Porter, actress (b. 1922)
  - Naomi Stevens, actress (b. 1925)
- January 14
  - Barbara Cope, rock 'n' roll groupie (b. 1950)
  - Paul Lustig Dunkel, American flutist and conductor (b. 1943)
  - Dan Gurney, racing driver (b. 1931)
  - Bill Hughes, jazz trombonist (b. 1930)
  - Mario Martinez, weightlifter (b. 1957)
  - Samuel A. Schreiner Jr., writer (b. 1921)
  - Milton Shadur, federal judge (b. 1924)
  - Marlene VerPlanck, jazz singer (b. 1933)
  - Hugh Wilson, film director and television producer (b. 1943)
- January 15
  - Romana Acosta Bañuelos, public servant (b. 1925)
  - Bob Barton, baseball player (b. 1941)
  - Anshel Brusilow, American violinist and conductor (b. 1928)
  - Edwin Hawkins, musician (b. 1943)
  - Dick King, American politician (b. 1934)
  - Mathilde Krim, Italian-born HIV/AIDS researcher (b. 1926)
  - William Scharf, artist (b. 1927)
  - Mike Shanahan, professional sports team owner (St. Louis Blues) (b. 1939)
  - Wilse B. Webb, psychologist and sleep researcher (b. 1920)
- January 16
  - Bill Bain, management consultant (b. 1937)
  - George Bandy, politician (b. 1945)
  - Bradford Dillman, actor (b. 1930)
  - LaFayette Duckett, politician (b. 1918)
  - Kingdon Gould Jr., diplomat (b. 1923)
  - Tyler Hilinski, football player (b. 1996)
  - Julie Beth Lovins, computational linguist (b. 1945)
  - John Monteith, actor, writer and director (b. 1948)
  - Timothy J. O'Connor Jr., politician (b. 1936)
  - Thomas Newman O'Neill Jr., federal judge (b. 1928)
  - Harold Rosen, politician (b. 1925)
  - John Spellman, politician (b. 1926)
  - Jo Jo White, basketball player (b. 1946)
- January 17
  - John M. Andrist, journalist and politician (b. 1931)
  - Landrum Bolling, political scientist and academic administrator (b. 1913)
  - Paul Booth, political activist (b. 1943)
  - Ed Moses, artist and painter (b. 1926)
  - Arno Motulsky, German-born geneticist (b. 1923)
  - Herbert Schmertz, public relations executive (b. 1930)
- January 18
  - Julius Lester, civil rights activist, writer, musician, photographer, professor (b. 1939)
  - Edward C. Rochette, numismatist (b. 1927)
  - B. L. Shaw, educator and politician (b. 1933)
  - Anthony Allen Shore, serial killer and rapist (b. 1962)
  - Henry Soles Jr., chaplain and author (b. 1935)
  - Mae Tischer, politician (b. 1928)
  - Stansfield Turner, admiral and academic (b. 1923)
- January 19
  - Harvey R. Blau, attorney and executive (b. 1935)
  - Lin Bolen, television executive and producer (b. 1941)
  - James C. Browne, computer scientist (b. 1934)
  - Olivia Cole, actress (b. 1942)
  - John Conboy, television producer (b. 1934)
  - Ed LaForge, politician (b. 1935)
  - Dorothy Malone, actress (b. 1924)
  - Fredo Santana, rapper and singer-songwriter (b. 1990)
  - Allison Shearmur, film producer (b. 1963)
  - Moose Stubing, baseball player (b. 1938)
  - Barbara Weil, artist (b. 1933)
  - Leslie Wyche, community activist (b. 1944)
- January 20
  - Wendell Castle, furniture designer and artist (b. 1932)
  - John Coleman, American meteorologist (b. 1934)
  - William Cousins, judge (b. 1927)
  - Terry Evans, blues and soul singer, songwriter and guitarist (b. 1937)
  - Naomi Parker Fraley, naval machinist (b. 1921)
  - Bill Johnson, 57, American baseball player (b. 1960)
  - Jerry Keeling, American-born Canadian football player (b. 1939)
  - Bob Smith, American comedian and author (b. 1958)
  - Jack Whitten, artist (b. 1939)
- January 21
  - A. Dean Jeffs, politician (b. 1928)
  - Jim Johannson, American ice hockey player (b. 1964)
  - Lyle Mehrkens, politician (b. 1937)
  - Connie Sawyer, actress (b. 1912)
- January 22
  - Carl Blair, painter and sculptor (b. 1932)
  - Andrew Carroll, 32, American ice hockey player (b. 1985)
  - Dale Engstrom, politician (b. 1917)
  - Billy Hancock, musician (b. 1946)
  - Ursula K. Le Guin, novelist (b. 1929)
  - William Joseph McDonough, banker (b. 1934)
  - Preston Shannon, blues singer, songwriter and guitarist (b. 1947)
  - Annie Young, politician, chronic obstructive pulmonary disease (b. 1942)
- January 23
  - Robert Dowdell, actor (b. 1932)
  - Galen L. Stone, American diplomat (b. 1921)
  - Ezra Swerdlow, film producer (b. 1953)
  - Wyatt Tee Walker, American pastor, civil rights leader, and theologian (b. 1928)
  - Lari White, American country singer (b. 1965)
- January 24
  - Bill Budness, football player (b. 1943)
  - Jack Ketchum, author (b. 1946)
  - Warren Miller, American ski and snowboarding filmmaker (b. 1924)
  - Raymond Nimmer, legal scholar (b. 1944)
- January 25
  - Daniel M. Buechlein, Roman Catholic prelate (b. 1938)
  - Dan Foster, medical researcher (b. 1930)
  - Bill Logan, American basketball player (b. 1934)
  - Floyd Miles, blues guitarist, singer and songwriter (b. 1943)
  - John Morris, American film composer (b. 1926)
- January 26
  - Kendall Carly Browne, actress (b. 1918)
  - Buzz Clifford, American singer (b. 1942)
  - Raphael Cruz, acrobat and actor (b. 1986)
  - Elizabeth Hawley, journalist (b. 1923)
  - Joe M. Haynes, American politician (b. 1936)
  - Von G. Keetch, religious leader (b. 1960)
  - Cyrus Yavneh, producer (b. 1941)
  - Isaiah Zeldin, Reform rabbi, founder of Stephen S. Wise Temple (b. 1920)
- January 27
  - Robert McCormick Adams Jr., anthropologist (b. 1926)
  - Jerry Butler, pornographic actor (b. 1959)
  - Alfred Hübler, German-born American physicist (b. 1957)
  - Robert Parry, investigative journalist (b. 1949)
  - Dennis Peron, American cannabis and LGBT activist (b. 1945)
  - Jerry Sneva, racing driver (b. 1949)
  - Mort Walker, comic artist (Beetle Bailey) (b. 1923)
- January 29
  - Hilton McConnico, American designer (b. 1943)
  - Rick McKay, filmmaker (b. 1956)
  - Robert D. McWethy, submarine captain (b. 1920)
  - Eddie Shaw, saxophonist and songwriter (b. 1937)
- January 30
  - John W. Kern III, judge (b. 1928)
  - Charles E. Lindblom, academic (b. 1917)
  - James McCray, opera singer and teacher (b. 1938)
  - Mark Salling, actor (b. 1982)
  - Clyde Scott, football player (b. 1924)
  - Victor W. Sidel, physician (b. 1931)
  - Kevin Towers, baseball executive (b. 1961)
  - Louis Zorich, actor (b. 1924)
- January 31
  - Richard N. Berry, politician (b. 1915)
  - Rasual Butler, basketball player (b. 1979)
  - Leah LaBelle, Canadian-born singer (b. 1986)
  - Del Delker, gospel singer (b. 1924)
  - Gabriel Fackre, theologian (b. 1926)
  - Oscar Gamble, baseball player (b. 1949)
  - Jack Halpern, chemist (b. 1924)
  - Elizabeth Hartley, archaeologist and curator (b. 1942)
  - John Fitzallen Moore, physicist (b. 1928)
  - William O'Connor, artist (b. 1970)

=== February ===
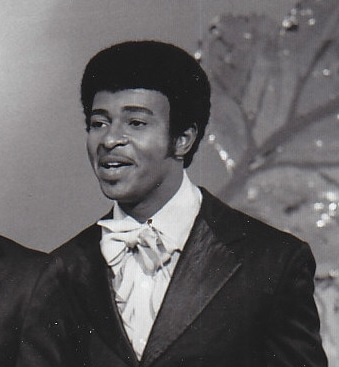
Dennis Edwards

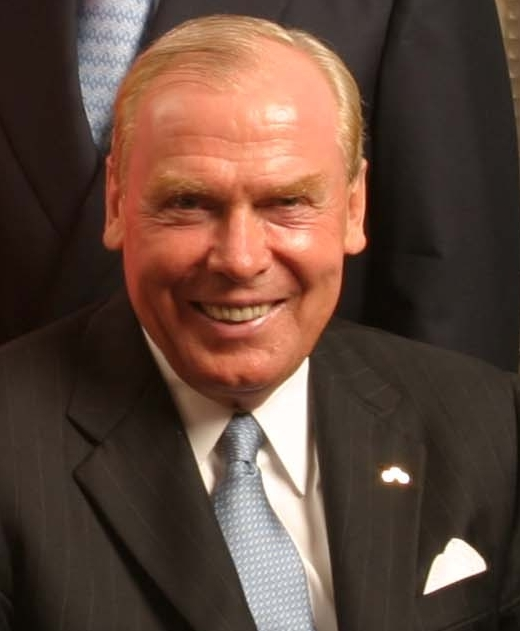
Jon Huntsman Sr.

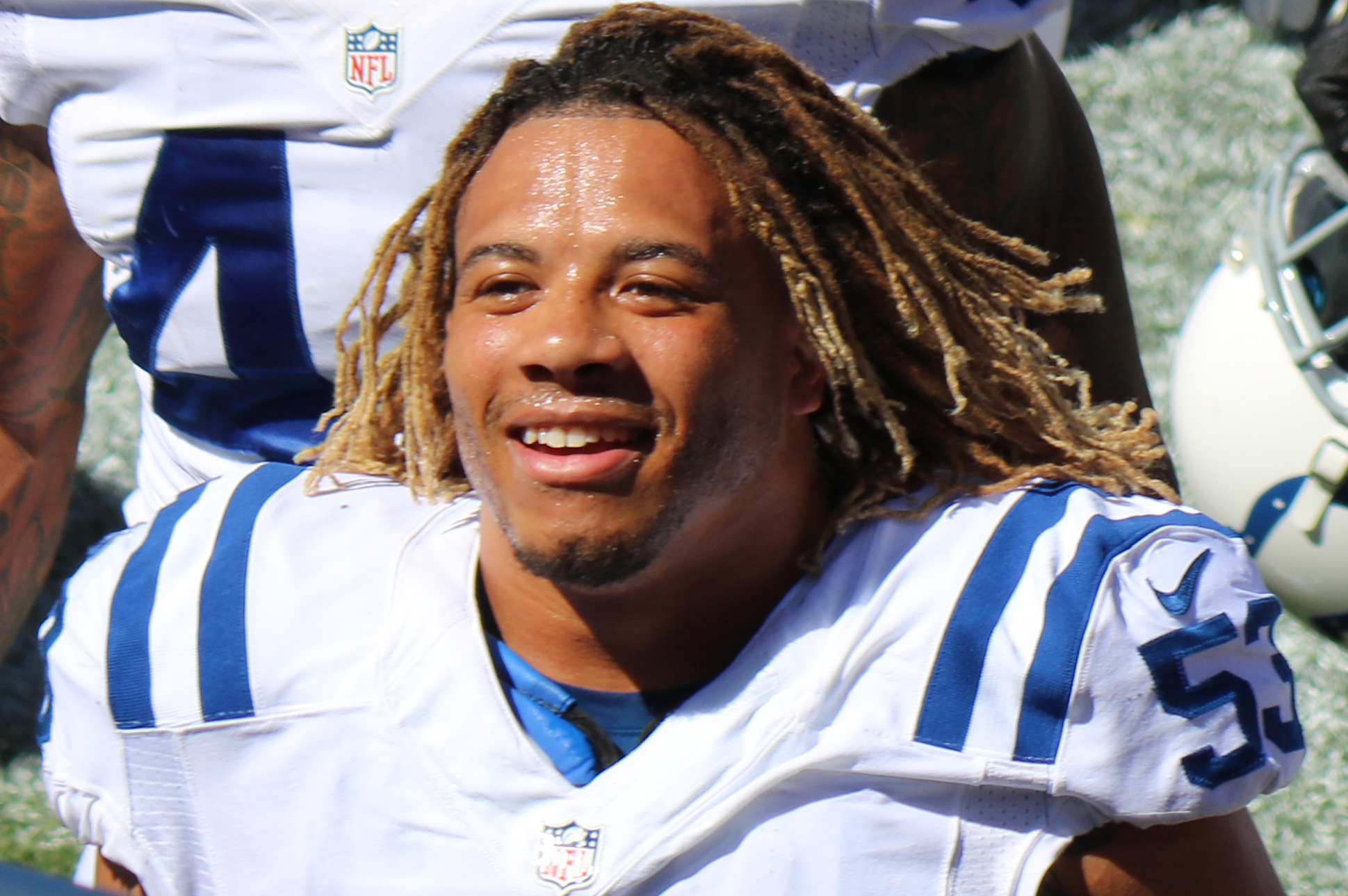
Edwin Jackson

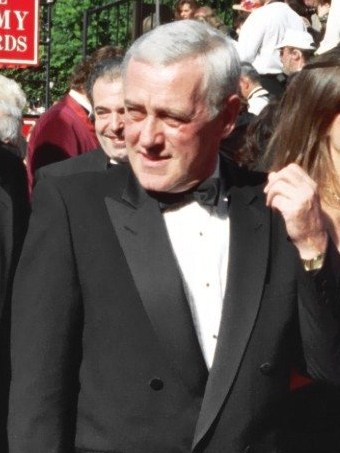
John Mahoney

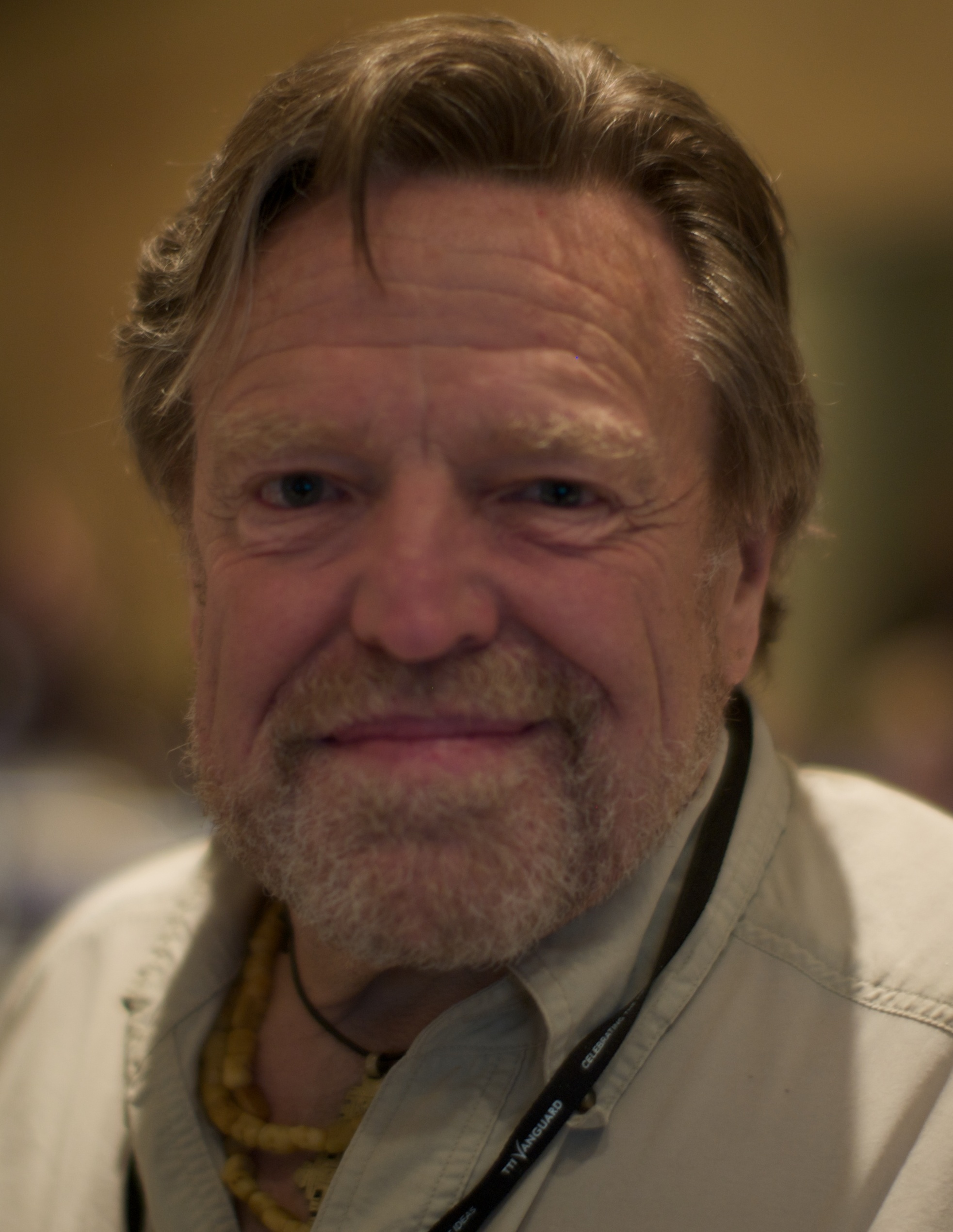
John Perry Barlow

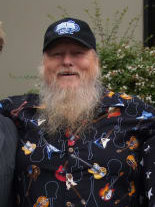
Mickey Jones

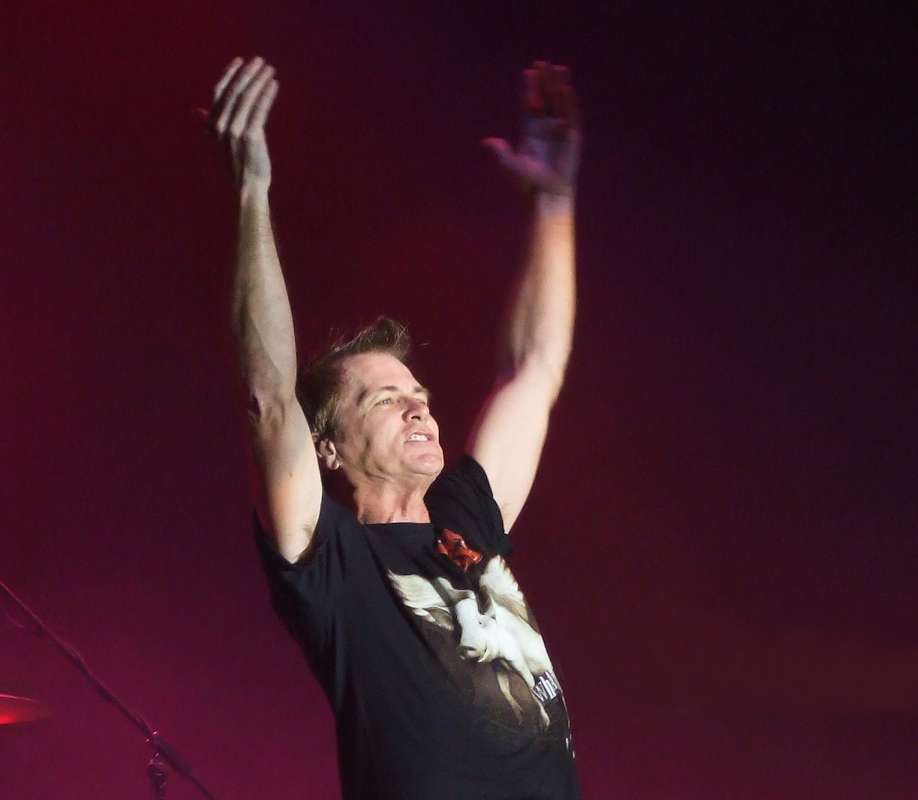
Pat Torpey

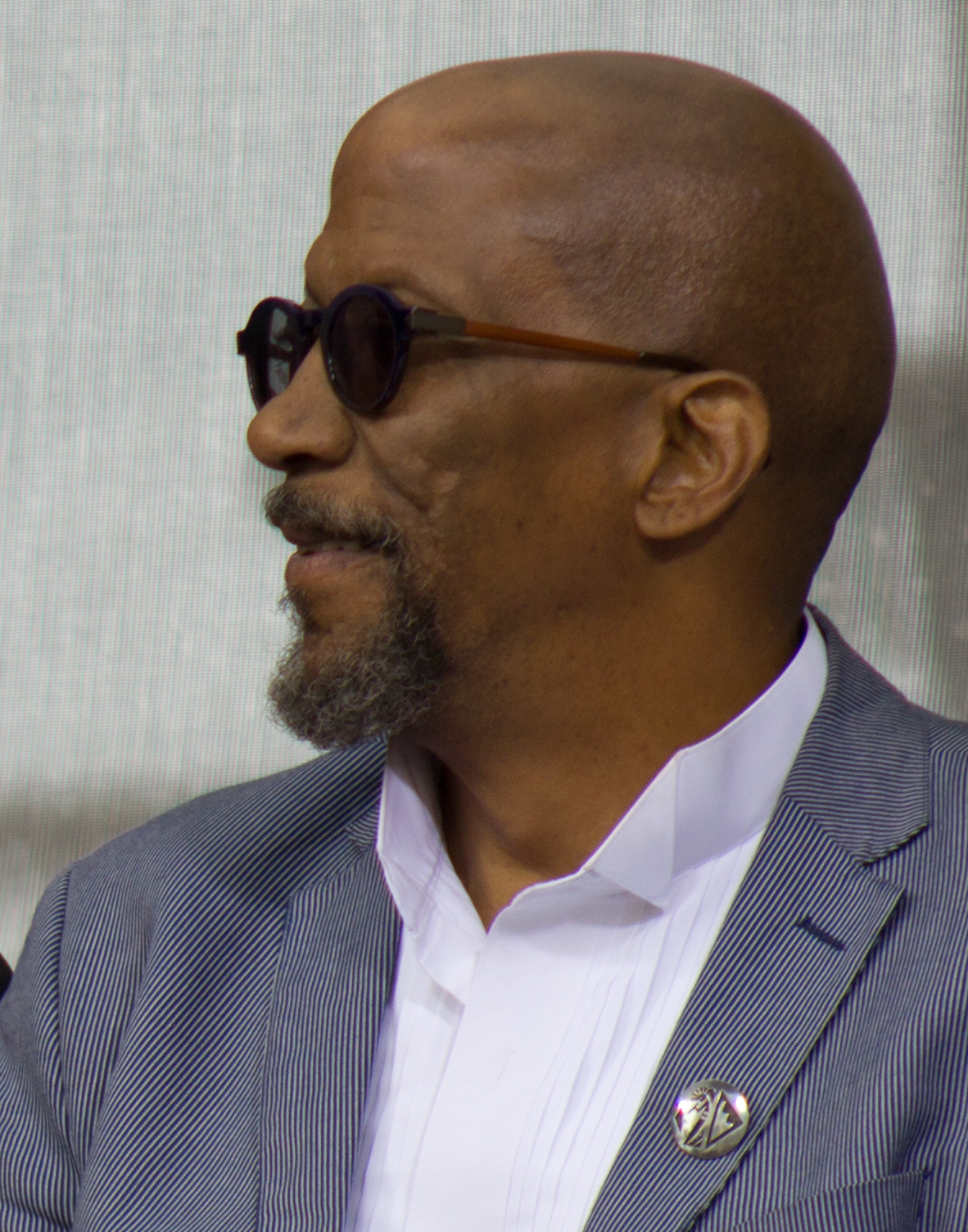
Reg E. Cathey

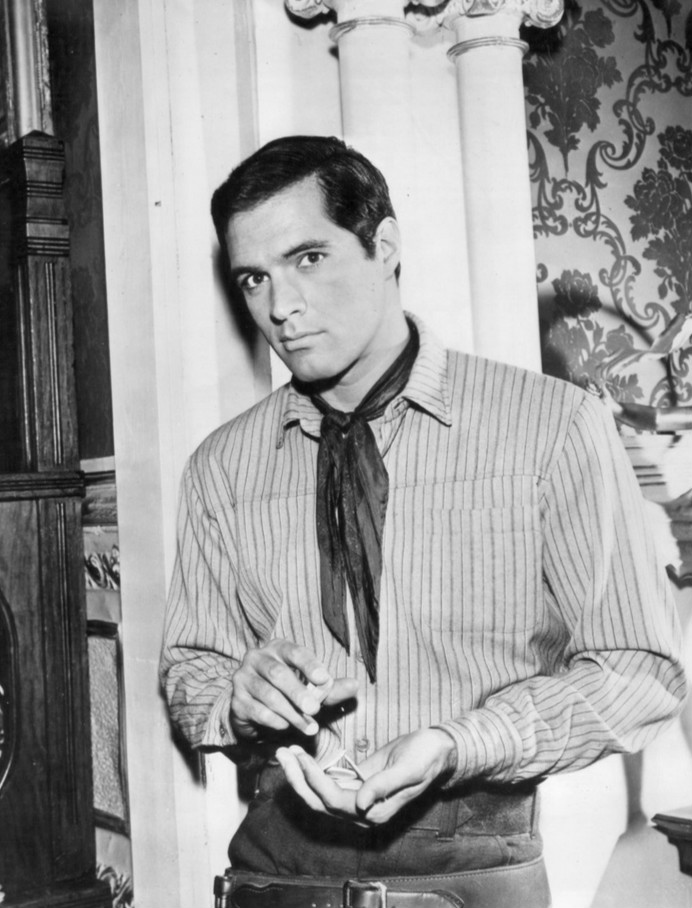
John Gavin

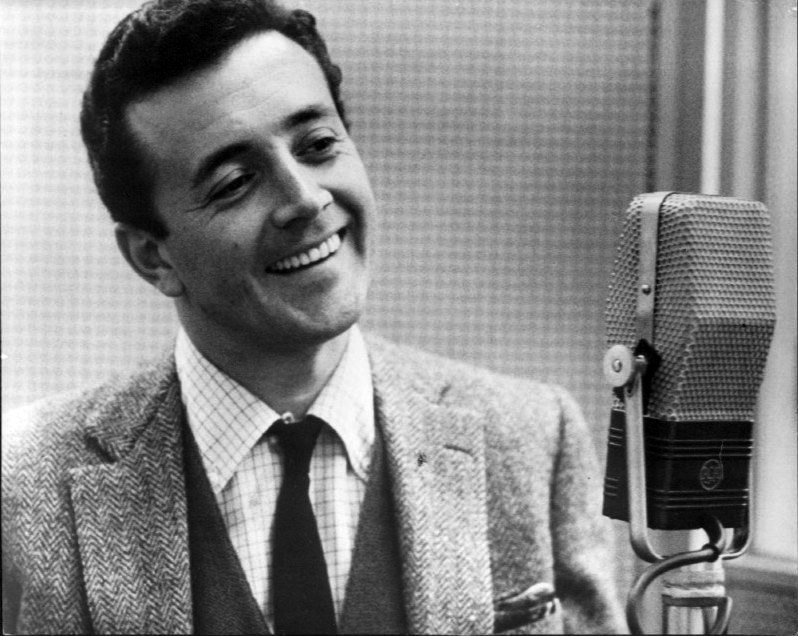
Vic Damone

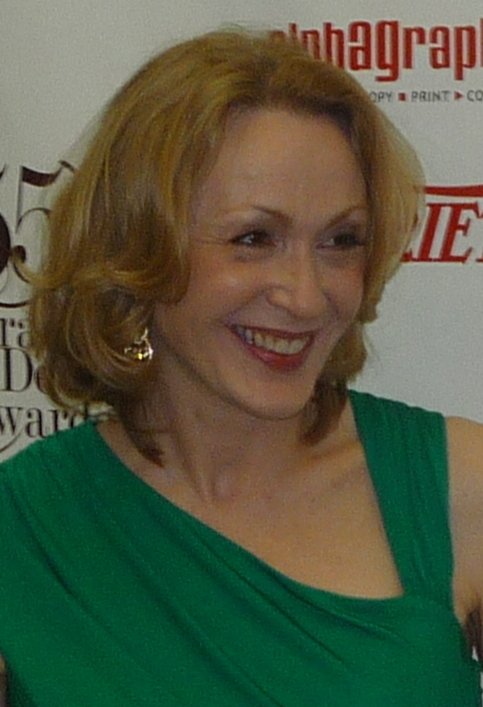
Jan Maxwell

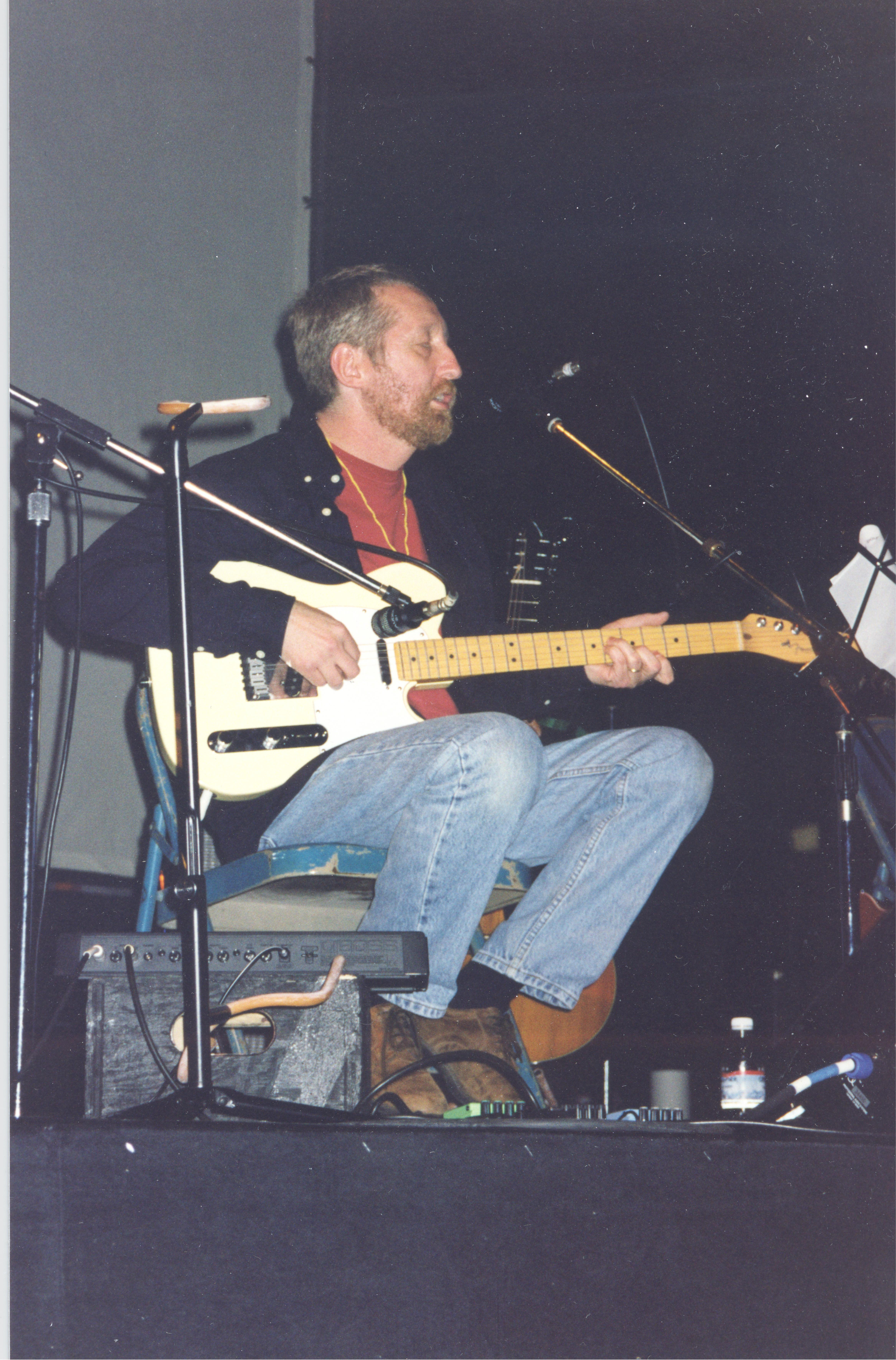
Tom Rapp

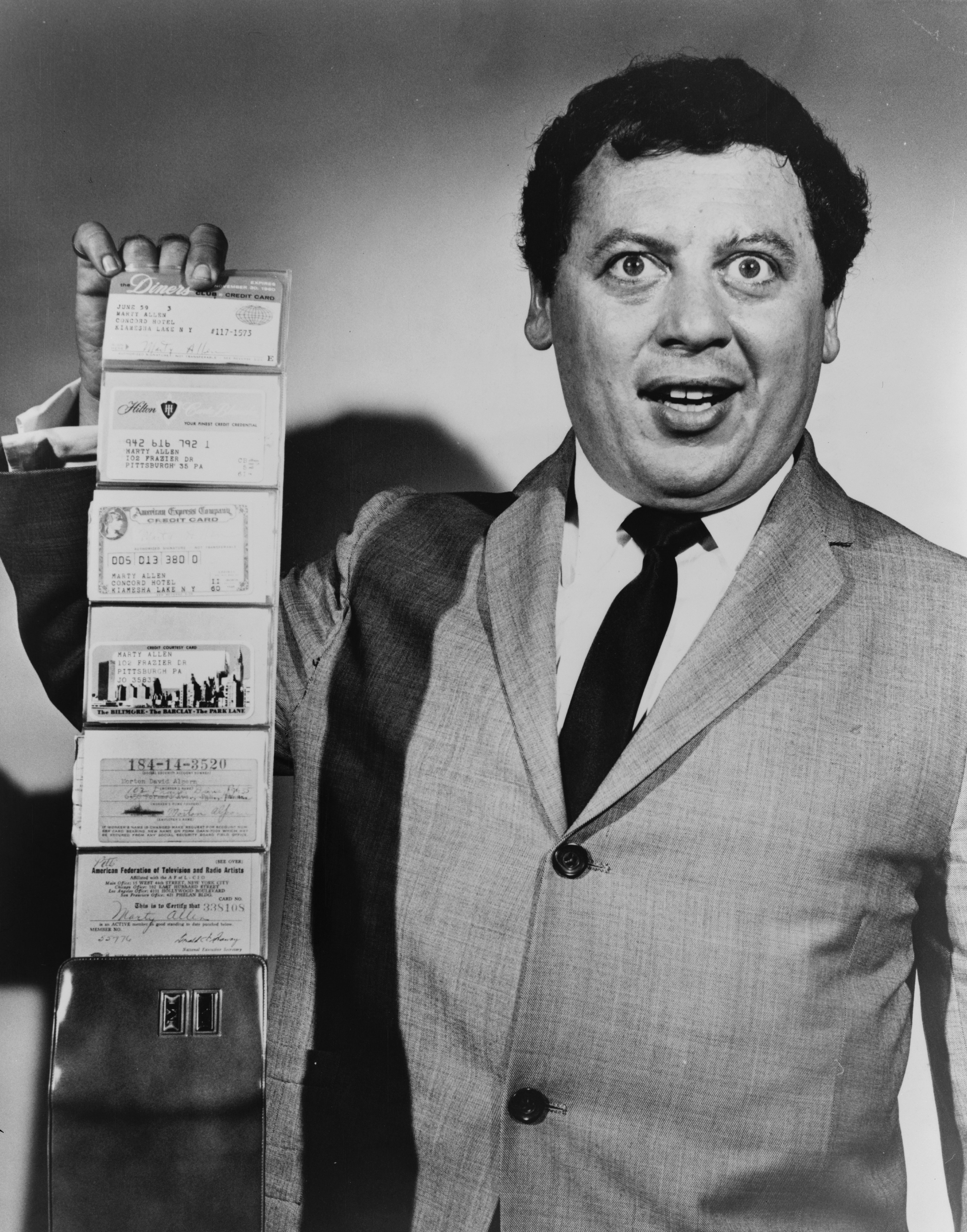
Marty Allen

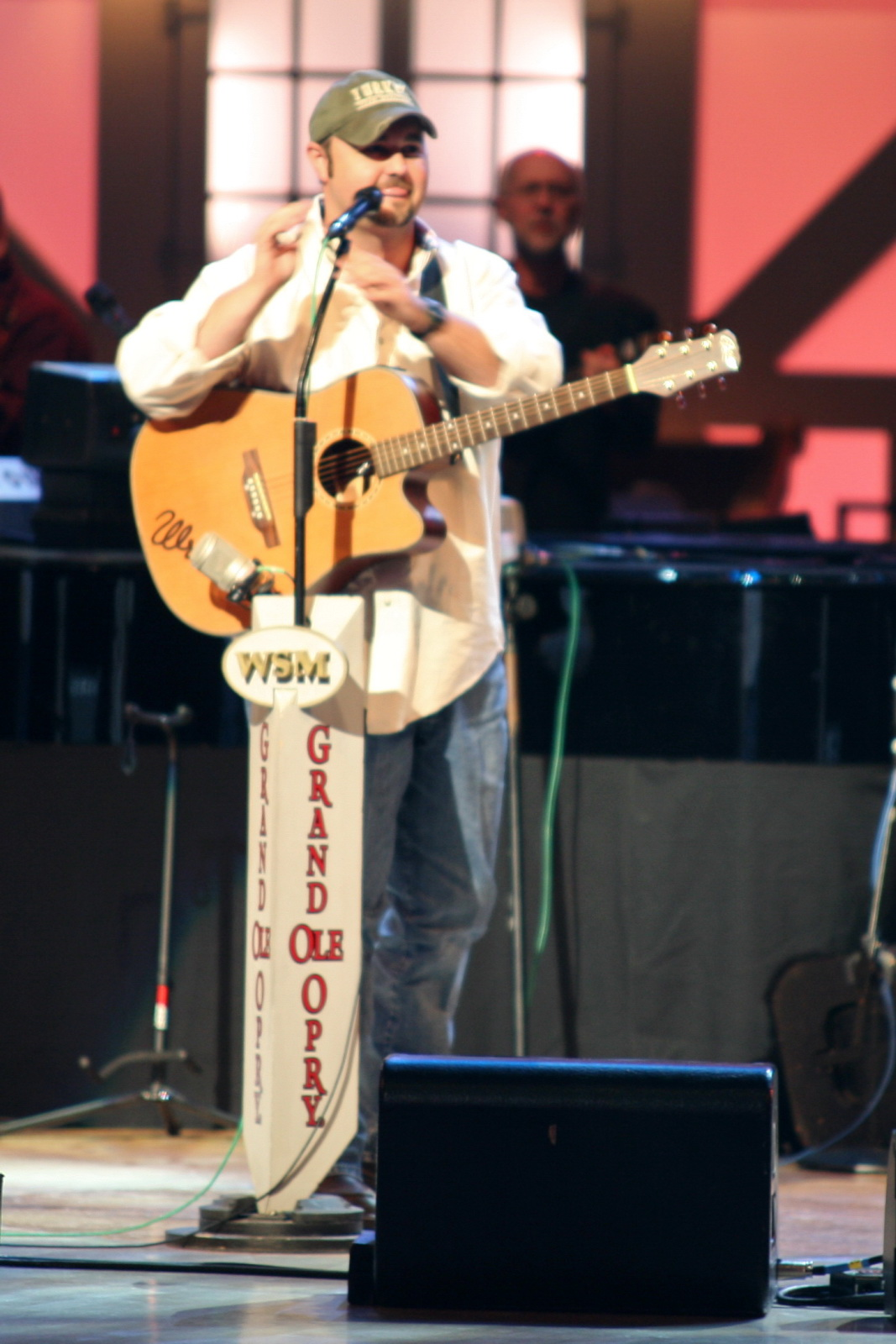
Daryle Singletary

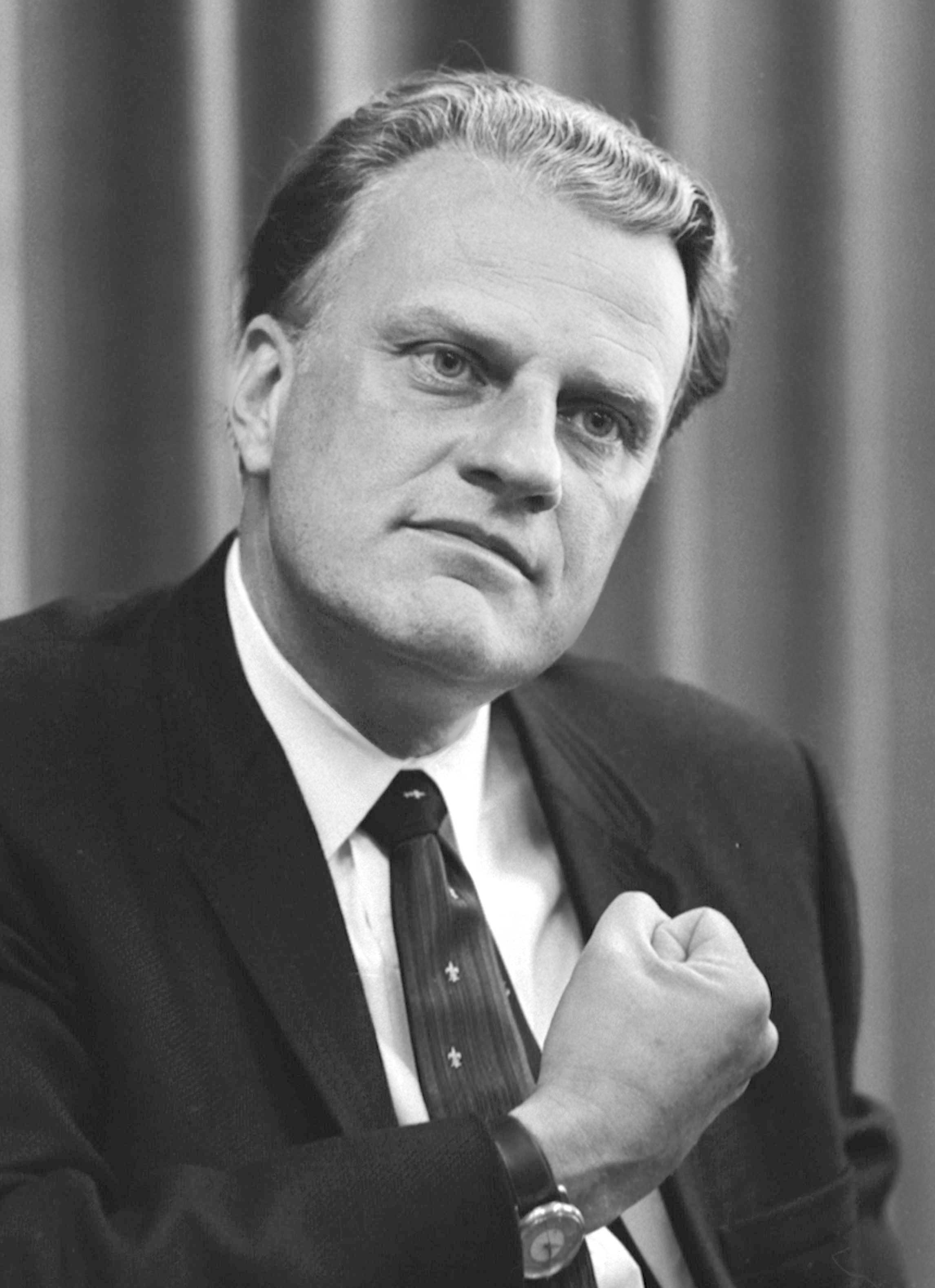
Billy Graham

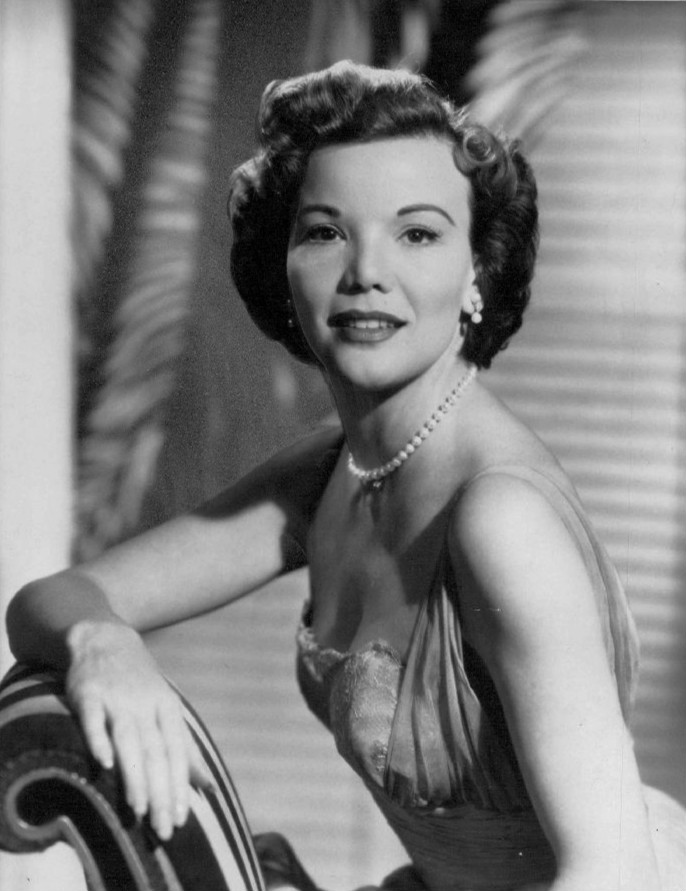
Nanette Fabray

- February 1
  - Cliff Bourland, athlete (b. 1921)
  - Dennis Edwards, singer (b. 1943)
  - Sonia Gechtoff, painter (b. 1926)
  - Nicholas von Hoffman, journalist (b. 1929)
  - Barys Kit, Belarusian-born rocket scientist (b. 1910)
  - Michael O'Hara, Olympic volleyball player (b. 1932)
  - Frank L. Oliver, politician (b. 1922)
  - Sewall Shurtz, Olympic fencer (b. 1933)
  - Alan Stout, composer (b. 1932)
- February 2
  - Jon Huntsman Sr., businessman and philanthropist (b. 1937)
  - Joseph Polchinski, theoretical physicist (b. 1954)
- February 3
  - Sam Cataldo, politician (b. 1937)
  - Leon "Ndugu" Chancler, jazz/pop drummer (b. 1952)
  - Pierre Conner, mathematician (b. 1932)
  - Roy Dietzel, baseball player (b. 1930)
  - Michael Harner, anthropologist and author (b. 1929)
  - George Shadid, politician (b. 1929)
  - Bill Teale, educator (b. 1947)
- February 4
  - Edwin Jackson, football player (b. 1991)
  - John Mahoney, British-born actor (b. 1940)
- February 7
  - John Perry Barlow, internet activist, writer and lyricist (b. 1947)
  - Mickey Jones, drummer (b. 1941)
  - Pat Torpey, drummer (b. 1953)
- February 8
  - Ben Agajanian, football player (b. 1919)
  - Carl K. Benhase, football coach (b. 1929)
  - Robert A. Gross, physicist and engineering scientist (b. 1927)
  - Algia Mae Hinton, blues singer and guitarist (b. 1929)
  - M. Cecil Mackey, academic administrator (b. 1928)
  - John Martinkovic, football player (b. 1926)
  - Lovebug Starski, rapper and disc jockey (b. 1960)
  - Sandra L. Townes, judge (b. 1944)
- February 9
  - Reg E. Cathey, actor (b. 1958)
  - John Gavin, actor and diplomat (b. 1931)
- February 10
  - Jeff Bell, political consultant (b. 1943)
  - Fran Bera, aviator (b. 1924)
  - Troy Blakely, music executive and talent manager (b. 1949)
  - Richard C. Lamb, astrophysicist (b. 1933)
  - Stephen A. Mahin, structural engineer (b. 1946)
  - Donald Mark, judge (b. 1926)
  - William Merriweather Peña, architect (b. 1918)
  - Calvin Edouard Ward, concert pianist (b. 1925)
- February 11
  - Anthony Acevedo, soldier and diarist (b. 1924)
  - Michael Cohen, physician and anthropologist (b. 1937)
  - Vic Damone, singer and actor (b. 1928)
  - Jon D. Fox, politician (b. 1947)
  - Jan Maxwell, actress and singer (b. 1956)
  - Tom Rapp, singer-songwriter (b. 1947)
  - Andy Rice, football player (b. 1940)
- February 12
  - Marty Allen, comedian and actor (b. 1922)
  - Louise Latham, actress (b. 1922)
  - Daryle Singletary, country music singer (b. 1971)
- February 13
  - Edward M. Abroms, film editor (b. 1935)
  - Scott Boyer, singer, songwriter and musician (b. 1947)
  - Chyskillz, hip hop producer (b. 1969)
  - James W. Downing, naval officer and author (b. 1913)
  - Tito Francona, baseball player (b. 1933)
  - Sandra Love, politician (b. 1945)
  - Victor Milán, author (b. 1954)
  - George P. Steele, military officer (b. 1924)
  - Peter Daniel Truman, politician (b. 1934)
- February 14
  - Lois Barker, baseball player (b. 1923)
  - Lerone Bennett Jr., scholar and author (b. 1928)
  - Don Carter, investor (b. 1933)
  - Marty Dolin, American-born Canadian politician (b. 1939)
  - Billy Henderson, football coach (b. 1928)
  - Arthur J. Moss, cardiologist (b. 1931)
  - John Pitman, journalist (b. 1940)
- February 15
  - Lassie Lou Ahern, actress (b. 1920)
  - Tom Brewer, baseball player (b. 1931)
  - Don J. Briel, theologian (b. 1946)
  - Leo Cahill, American-Canadian football coach (b. 1928)
  - Chuck Klausing, football player and coach (b. 1925)
  - J. Clay Smith Jr., jurist and author (b. 1942)
- February 16
  - Jim Bridwell, free climber (b. 1944)
  - Little Sammy Davis, blues singer-songwriter and harmonicist (b. 1928)
  - Eleanor Winsor Leach, academic (b. 1937)
  - Harry R. Purkey, politician (b. 1934)
  - Mike Walker, gossip columnist (b. 1945)
- February 17
  - Jim Dickey, football coach (b. 1934)
  - Beebe Freitas, pianist and vocal coach (b. 1938)
  - Boyd Jarvis, music producer (b. 1958)
  - Kenneth Kester, politician (b. 1936)
- February 18
  - Günter Blobel, Silesian-born Nobel biologist (b. 1936)
  - Peggy Cooper Cafritz, social activist and educator (b. 1947)
  - Peirce F. Lewis, geographer (b. 1927)
  - Larry Lolley, state judge (b. 1945)
  - Lee Harris Pomeroy, architect (b. 1932)
  - Barbara Wersba, youth writer (b. 1932)
- February 19
  - Harry Blevins, politician (b. 1935)
  - Fred Carr, football player (b. 1946)
  - Max Desfor, photographer (b. 1913)
  - Thomas Lockhart, politician (b. 1935)
  - Robert McKim, politician (b. 1945)
  - Larry Smith, puppeteer (b. 1938)
  - Jim Springer, basketball player (b. 1926)
- February 20
  - David Caron, legal scholar (b. 1952)
  - William H. Friedland, rural sociologist (b. 1923)
  - DeWitt Hale, politician (b. 1917)
  - Waldo R. Tobler, geographer and cartographer (b. 1930)
- February 21 – Billy Graham, evangelist and Southern Baptist minister (b. 1918)
- February 22 – Nanette Fabray, actress (b. 1920)
- February 23
  - Dom Anile, football coach and executive (Indianapolis Colts) (b. 1937)
  - James Colby, actor (b. 1961)
  - Allen B. Rosenstein, systems engineer (b. 1920)
- February 24
  - Irwin Belk, politician, philanthropist and retail executive (b. 1922)
  - Ed Leede, 90, basketball player
  - Bud Luckey, actor and animator (b. 1934)
  - James McIntosh, rower, Olympic silver medalist (1956) (b. 1930)
  - Charles Byron Wilson, neurosurgeon (b. 1929)
- February 25
  - Dan Fegan, basketball agent (b. 1961)
  - Cynthia Heimel, columnist, author and humorist (b. 1947)
  - Richard Hundley, pianist and composer (b. 1931)
  - Burton Leland, politician (b. 1948)
  - John C. Mula, art director and production designer (b. 1942)
  - Frank Sander, law professor (b. 1927)
  - Bruce Nelson Stratton, radio personality (b. 1943)
- February 26
  - Paul De Meo, screenwriter and producer (b. 1953)
  - Jim Dobson, baseball player (b. 1939)
  - Jim L. Gillis Jr., politician (b. 1916)
  - Sean Lavery, ballet dancer (b. 1956)
  - Benjamin Melniker, film producer (b. 1913)
  - Carmen A. Orechio, politician (b. 1926)
  - Michael J. Pikal, pharmaceutical scientist (b. 1939)
  - Gary H. Posner, chemist (b. 1943)
- February 27
  - Gertrude Alderfer, baseball player (b. 1931)
  - William H. T. Bush, venture capitalist and financier (b. 1938)
  - Bill Lignante, comics artist(b. 1926)
  - Daniel Perlsweig, racehorse trainer (b. 1926)
- February 28
  - Barry Crimmins, comedian and social activist (b. 1953)
  - Keith English, politician (b. 1967)
  - Marc L. Marks, politician (b. 1926)
  - Harvey Schmidt, musical theatre producer and writer (b. 1929)
  - Naomi Siegmann, artist (b. 1932)
  - William R. Trotter, author and historian (b. 1943)

=== March ===
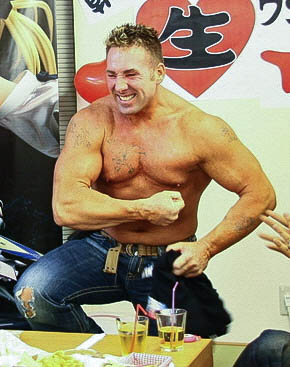
Billy Herrington

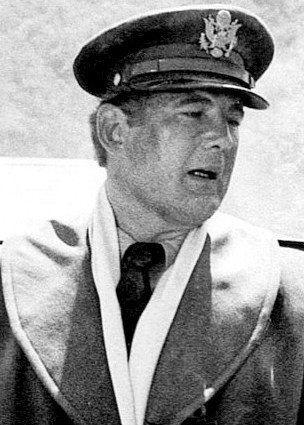
David Ogden Stiers

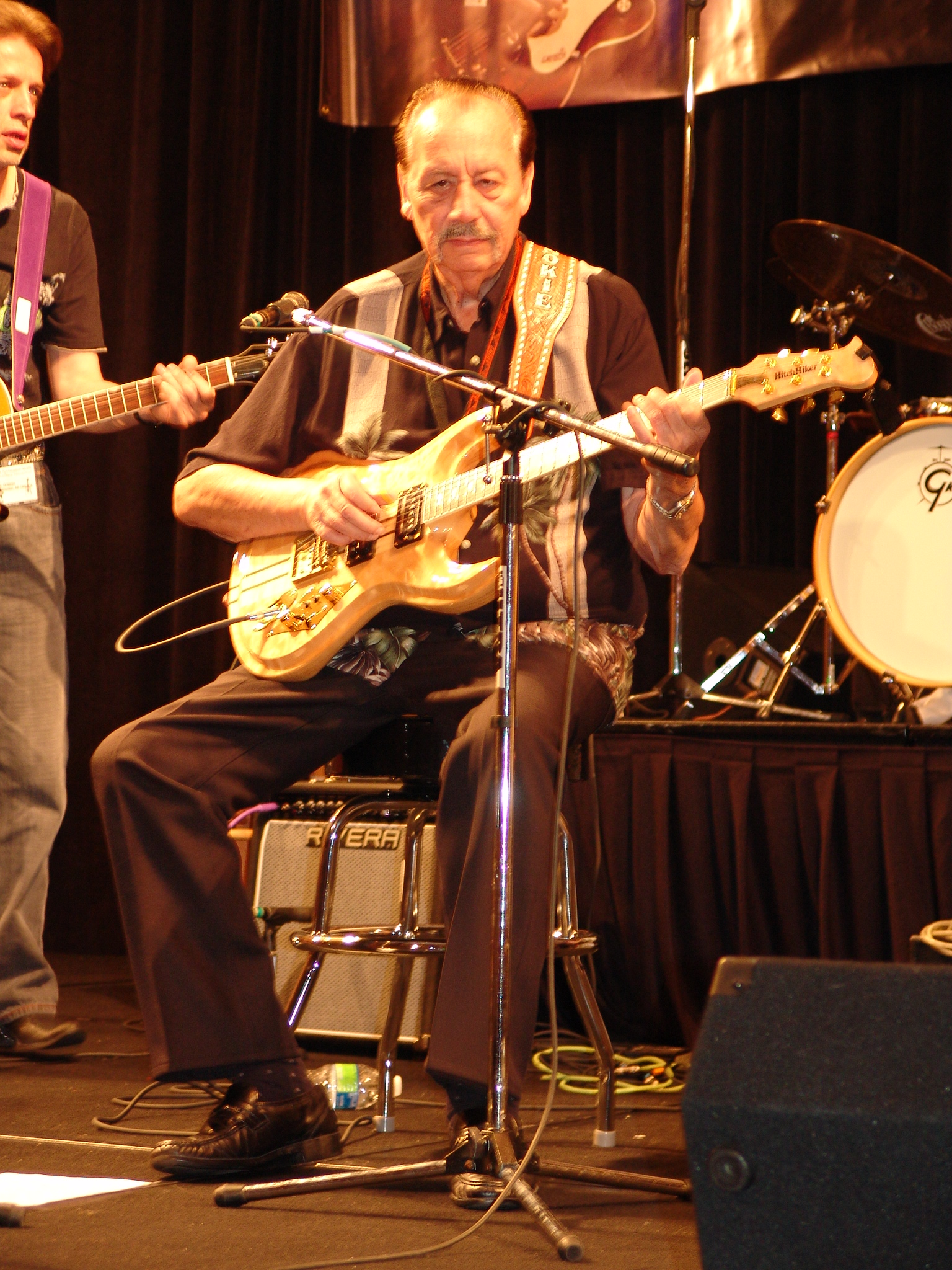
Nokie Edwards

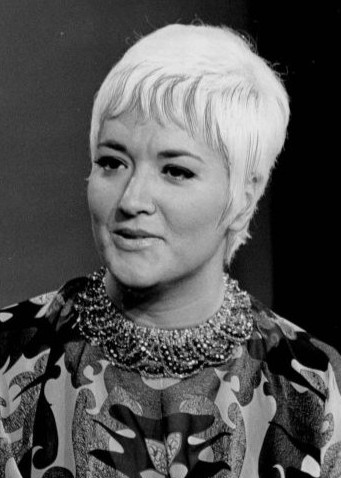
Morgana King

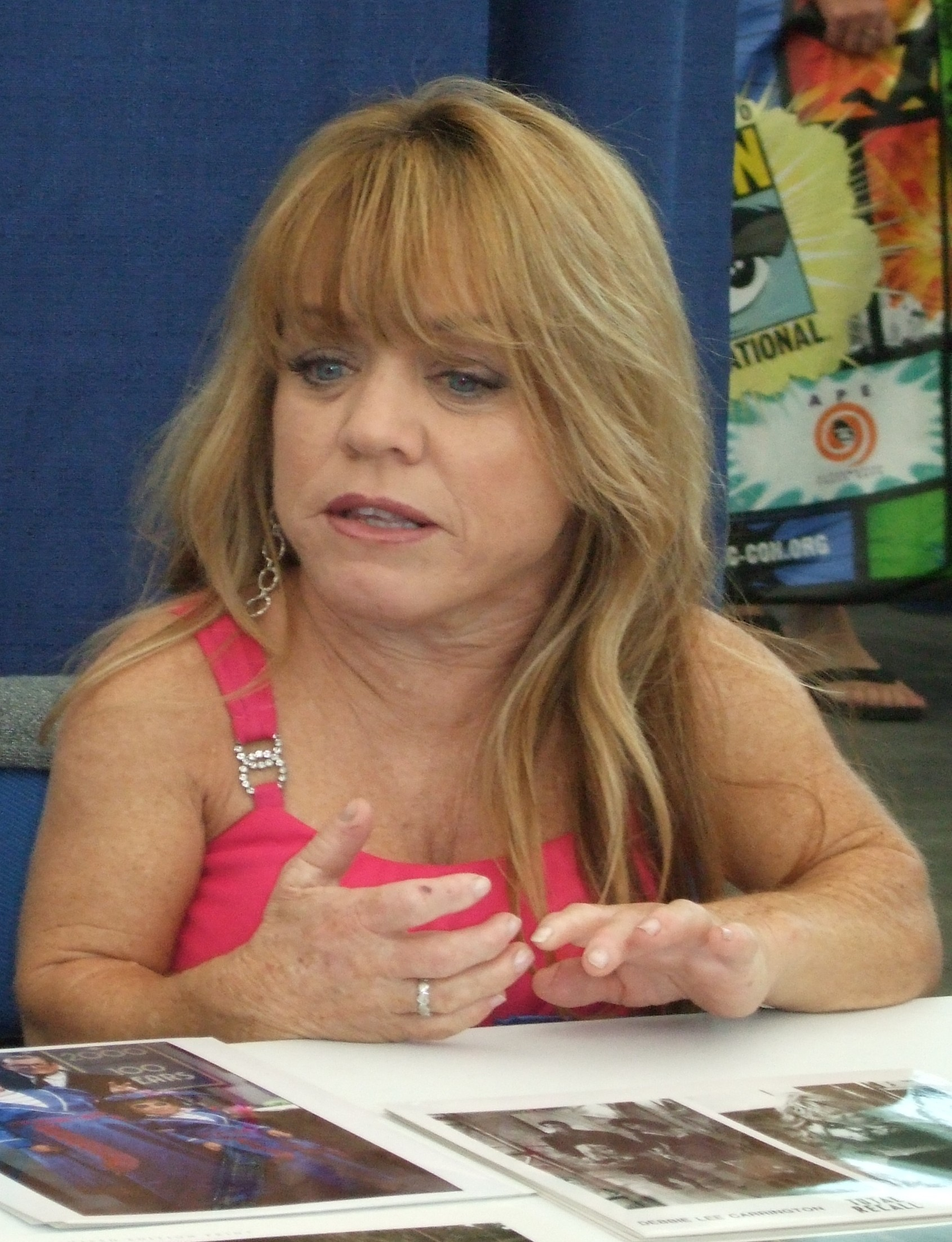
Debbie Lee Carrington

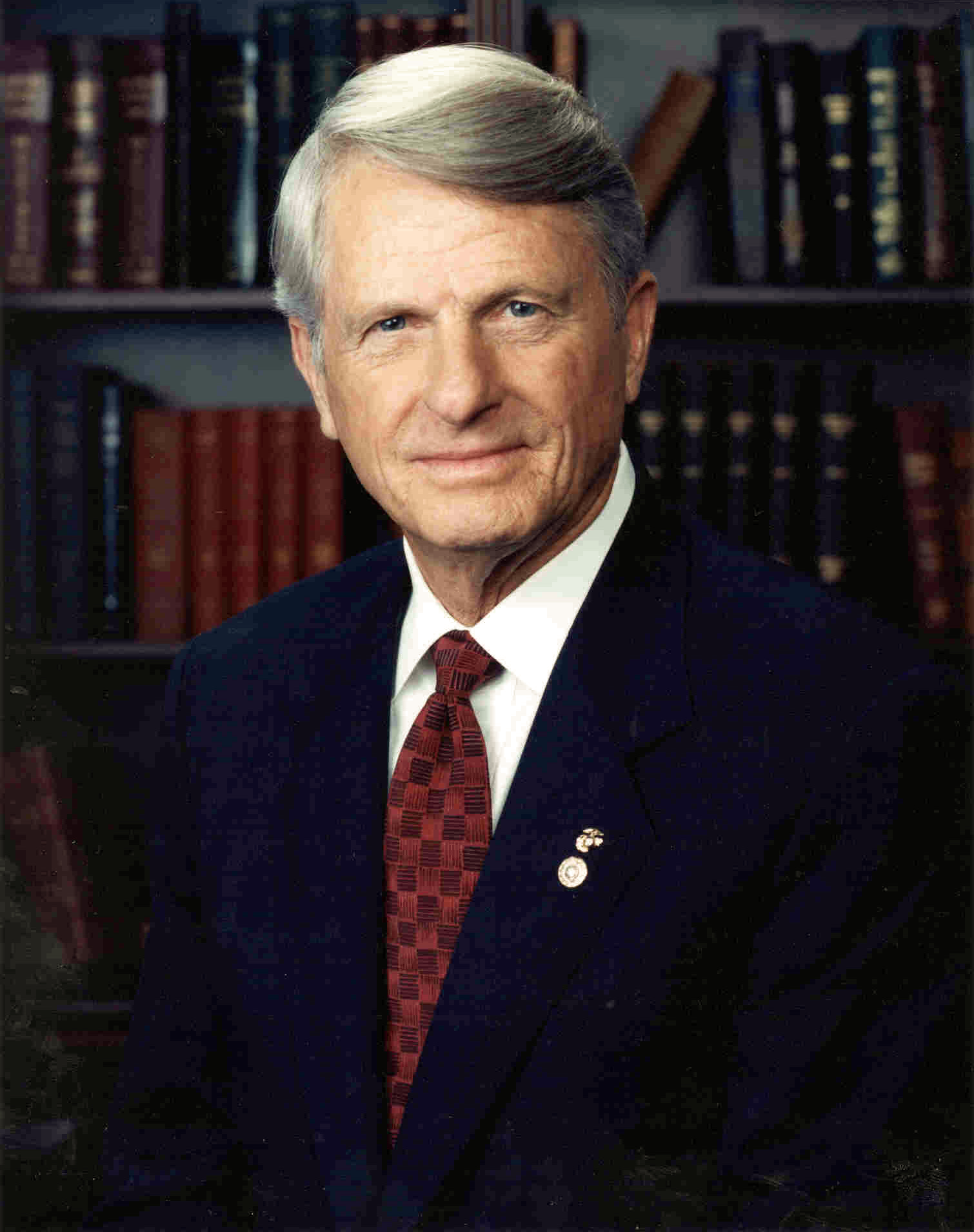
Zell Miller

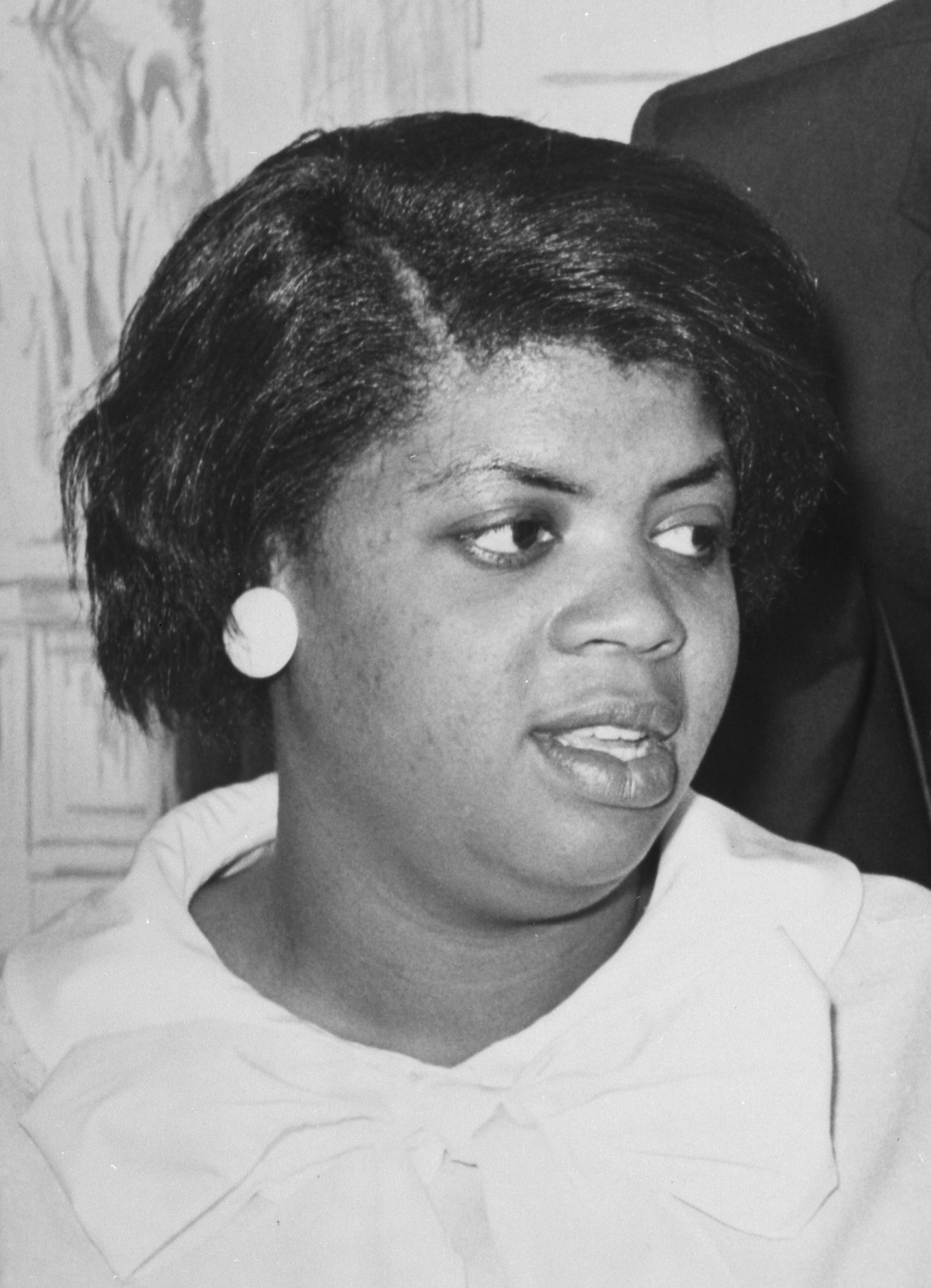
Linda Carol Brown

- March 1 – Anatoly Lein, Russian-born chess grandmaster (b. 1931)
- March 2
  - Billy Herrington, gay pornographic actor (b. 1969)
  - Ronnie Prophet, Canadian country singer (b. 1937)
- March 3 – David Ogden Stiers, American actor (b. 1942)
- March 5 – Hayden White, American historian (b. 1928)
- March 6 – Donna Butterworth, American actress (b. 1956)
- March 7
  - Gary Burden, American rock album cover artist (b. 1933)
  - Woody Durham, American college basketball radio announcer (b. 1941)
  - Chuck Ortmann, American football player (b. 1929)
  - William J. Pulte, American real estate developer (b. 1932)
  - Thomas L. Rhodes, American political activist (b. 1939)
  - Charles Thone, American politician, Governor of Nebraska (1979–1983), U.S. Representative (b. 1924)
- March 8
  - Ron Franklin, American jockey (b. 1959)
  - John P. Fullam, American federal judge (b. 1921)
  - Togo D. West Jr., American public servant (b. 1942)
  - Hal Wick, 73, American politician (b. 1944)
  - Kate Wilhelm, American author (b. 1928)
- March 10
  - Donald Collins, American politician (b. 1925)
  - Buddy Cruze, American football player (b. 1933)
  - Michael Gershman, American cinematographer, director and camera operator (b. 1944)
  - Henry Koffler, Austrian-born American academic (b. 1922)
  - Gene Rhodes, American basketball player (b. 1927)
- March 12
  - Ralph Doolan, American politician (b. 1933)
  - Nokie Edwards, American musician (b. 1935)
  - Ken Flach, American tennis player (b. 1963)
  - Craig Mack, American rapper (b. 1970)
- March 14
  - Alfred W. Crosby, American ecological historian (b. 1931)
  - Steve Mandell, American bluegrass guitarist and banjoist
- March 15 – Augie Garrido, NCAA baseball coach, won the second most career games of any NCAA Division I coach (b. 1939)
- March 16
  - Dayton S. Mak, diplomat (b. 1917)
  - Louise Slaughter, oldest member of the United States House of Representatives (b. 1929)
- March 17
  - Jim Hendricks, American actor and DJ (b. 1949)
  - Sammy Williams, American actor (b. 1948)
- March 18
  - Karen Anderson, American writer (b. 1932)
  - Chuck Arrobio, American football player (b. 1944)
  - Cloria Brown, American politician (b. 1942)
  - Killjoy, American singer (b. 1969)
  - Jerry Schoonmaker, American baseball player (b. 1933)
  - Hazel Smith, American country music journalist, publicist, and singer-songwriter (b. 1934)
- March 20
  - Peter George Peterson, American banker (b. 1926)
  - William Smith, American Olympic wrestler (b. 1928)
- March 22 – Morgana King, American jazz singer and actress (b. 1930)
- March 23
  - DuShon Monique Brown, American actress (b. 1968)
  - Debbie Lee Carrington, actress and stuntwoman (b. 1959)
  - Zell Miller, politician; Governor of Georgia (1991–1999), U.S. Senator (2000–2005) (b. 1932)
  - Delores Taylor, American actress, writer, and producer (b. 1932)
- March 25 – Linda Carol Brown, American campaigner for equality in education (b. 1943)
- March 27
  - David Humm, American football player (b. 1952)
  - Tom Martin, American politician (b. 1948)
  - Jerry Moses, American baseball player (b. 1946)
  - Kenny O'Dell, American country singer-songwriter (b. 1944)
  - James "Quick" Parker, American-Canadian football player (b. 1958)
  - Rosendo Rodriguez, American convicted rapist and murderer (b. 1980)
  - Robert Hugh Willoughby, American flautist (b. 1921)
- March 28
  - Armand Arabian, American jurist (b. 1934)
  - Travis Hill, American football player (b. 1969)
  - Walter E. Johnston III, American politician (b. 1935)
  - William Prochnau, American journalist (b. 1937)
  - Caleb Scofield, American rock bassist and singer (b. 1978)
  - Daryl Thomas, American basketball player (b. 1965)
- March 29
  - Don Colpoys, American baseball coach and manager (b. 1934)
  - Stephen Reinhardt, American judge (b. 1930)
  - Ed Samcoff, American baseball player (b. 1924)
  - Anita Shreve, American author (b. 1946)
  - Rusty Staub, American baseball player (b. 1944)
  - Paul Van Arsdale, American hammered dulcimer player (b. 1920)
- March 30
  - Alias, rapper (b. 1976)
  - Drue Heinz, American literary publisher (b. 1914)
- March 31
  - John Mack Flanagan, American disc jockey (b. 1946)
  - Charles Goodwin, American linguistic anthropologist and semiotician (b. 1943)
  - Ted J. Land, American politician (b. 1936)
  - Peg Lautenschlager, American attorney and politician, (b. 1955)
  - James McAlister, American football player (b. 1951)
  - Leonard D. Wexler, American judge (b. 1924)

=== April ===
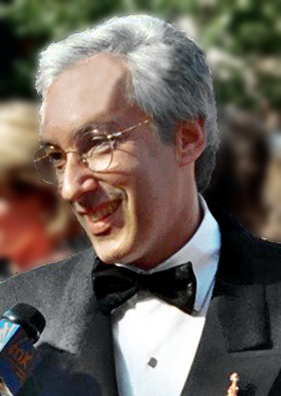
Steven Bochco

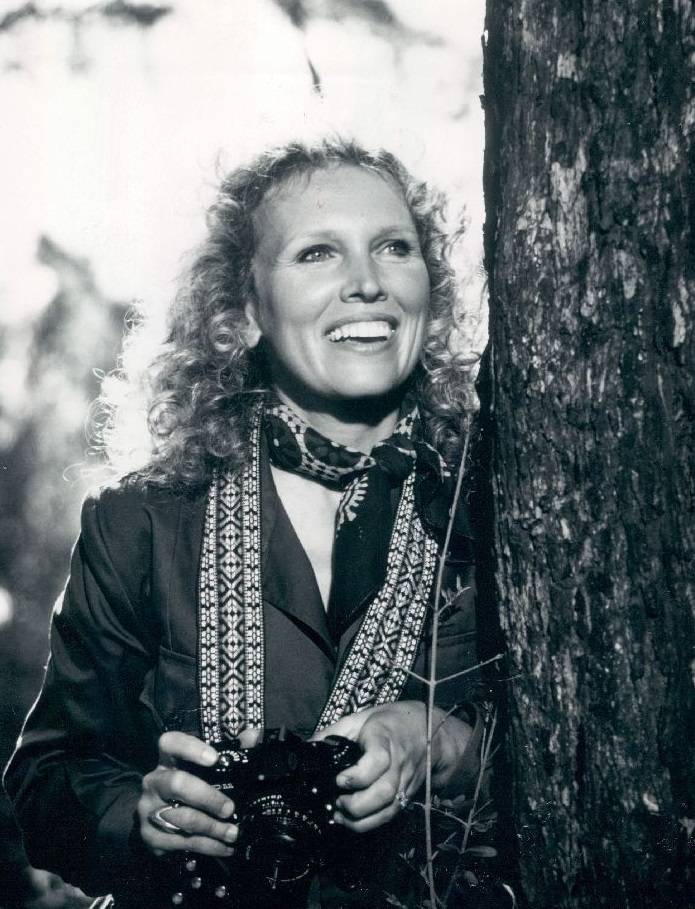
Susan Anspach

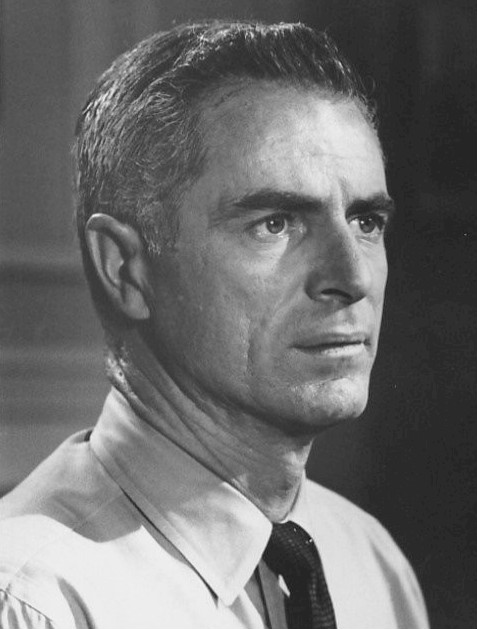
Tim O'Connor

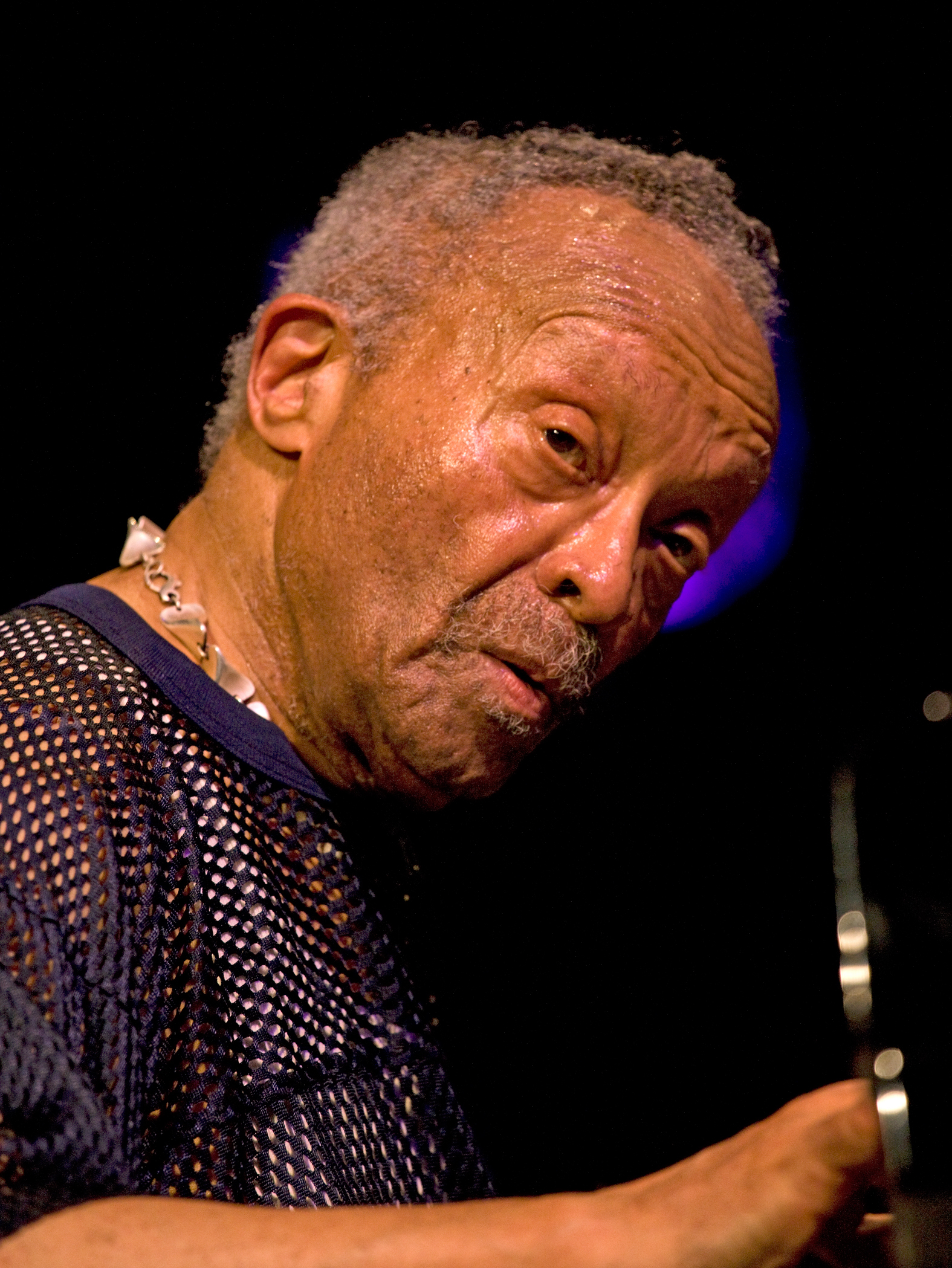
Cecil Taylor

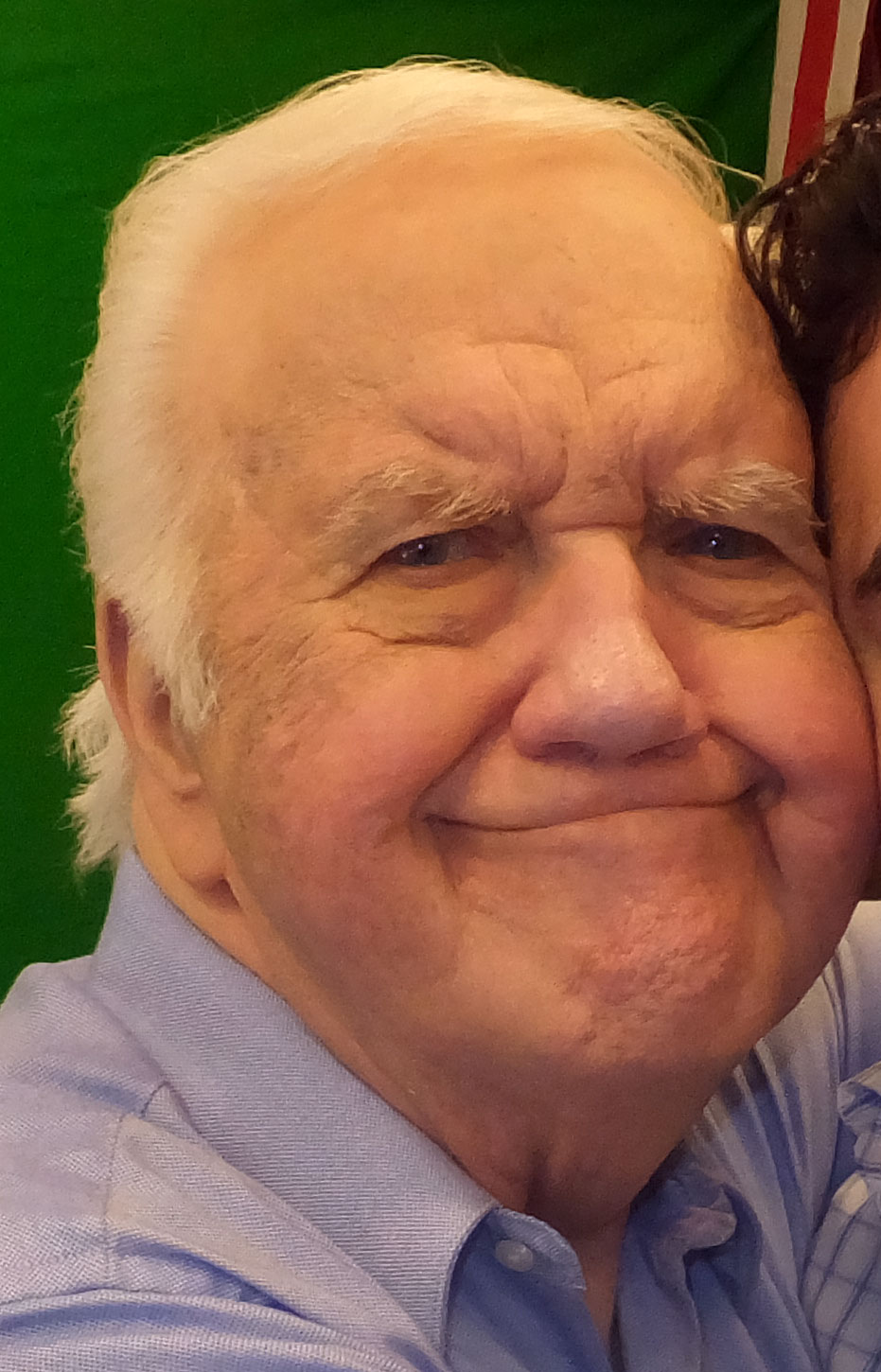
Chuck McCann

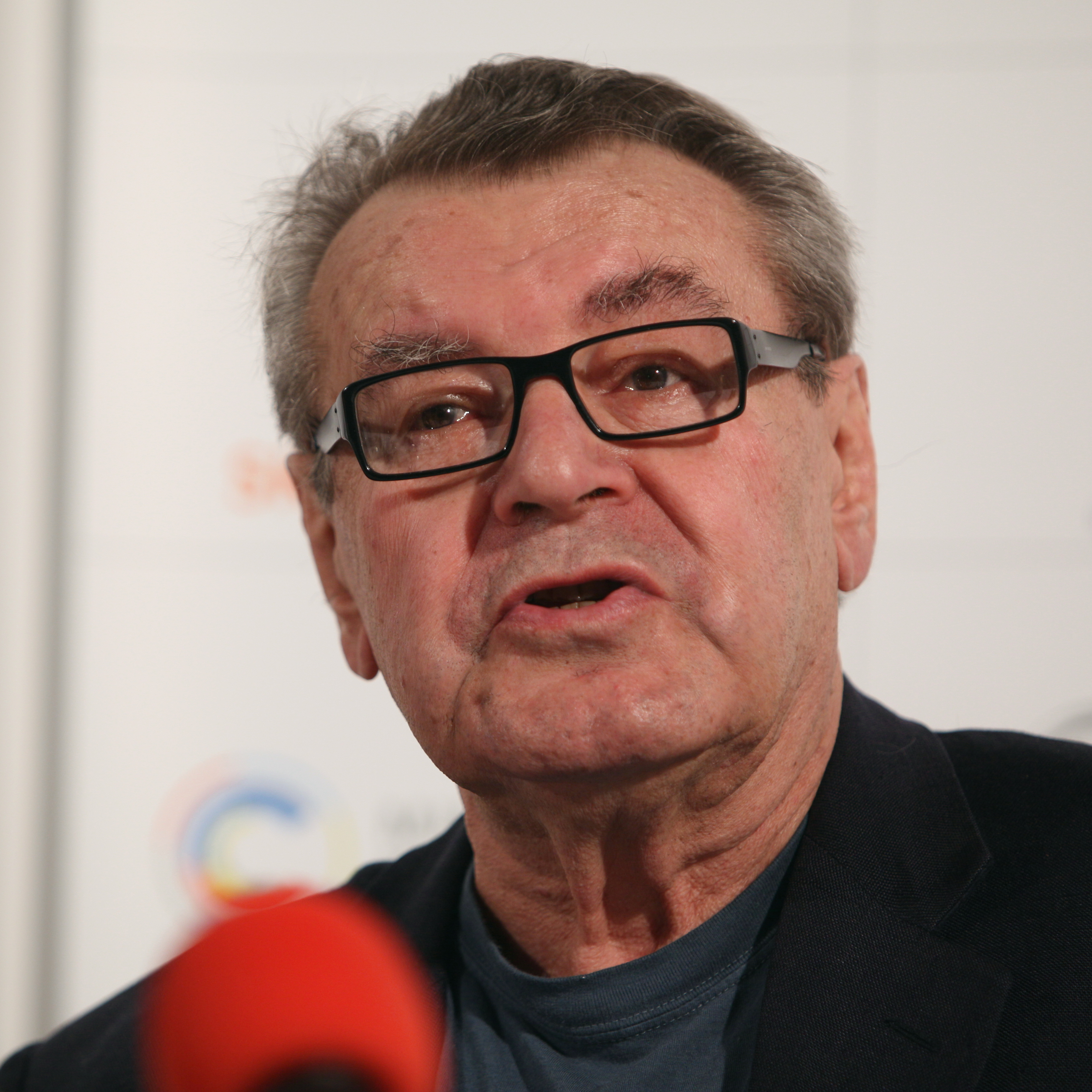
Miloš Forman

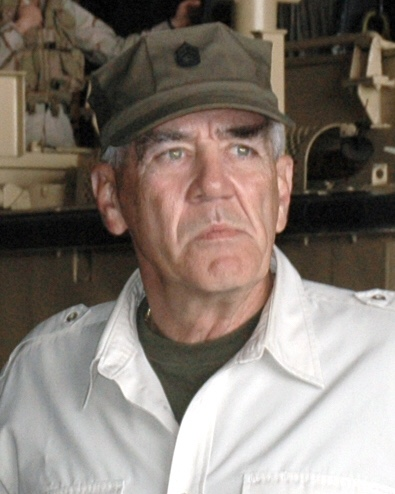
R. Lee Ermey

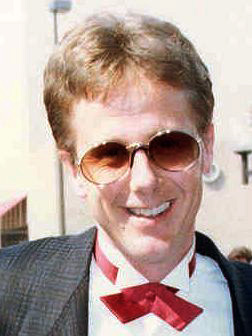
Harry Anderson

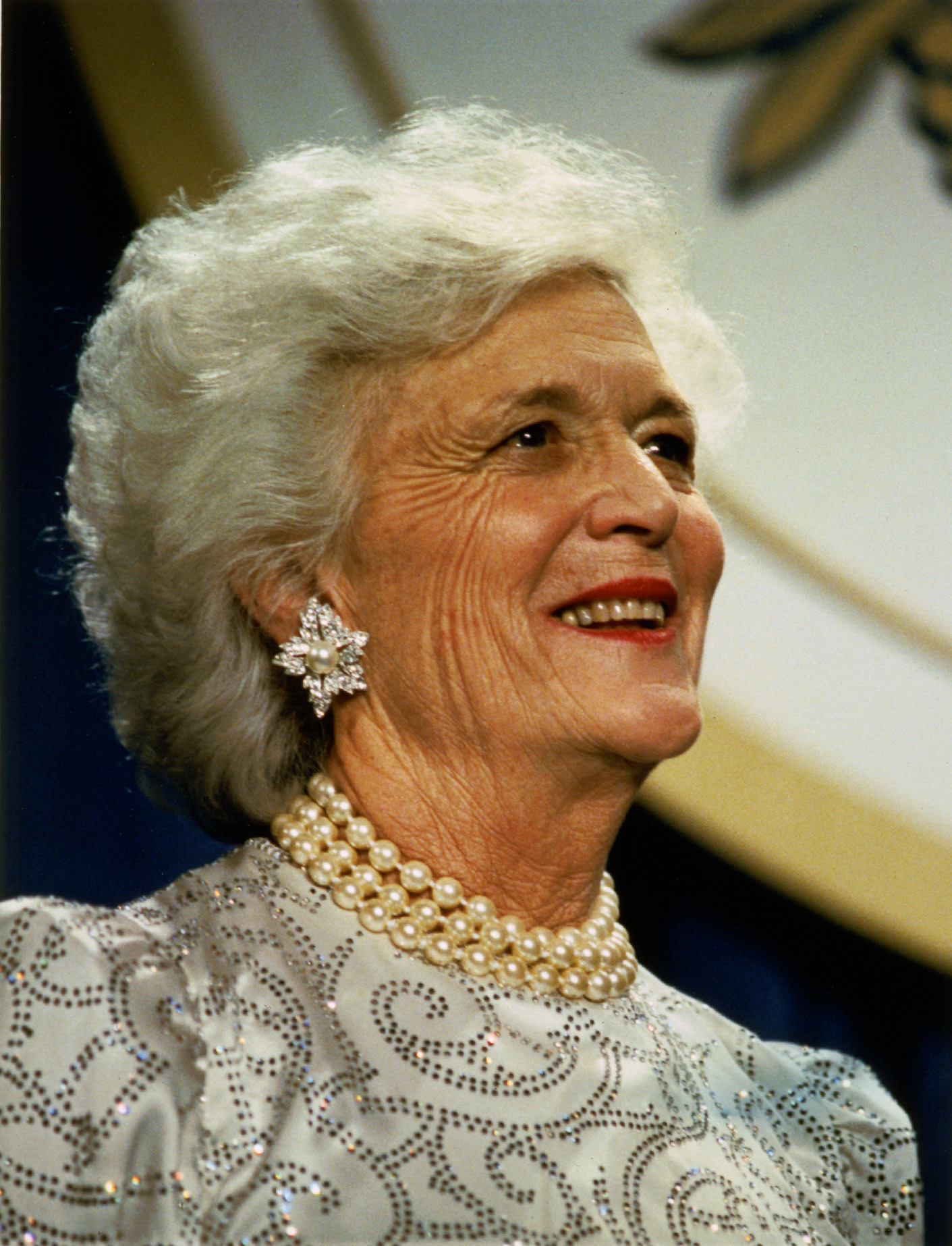
Barbara Bush

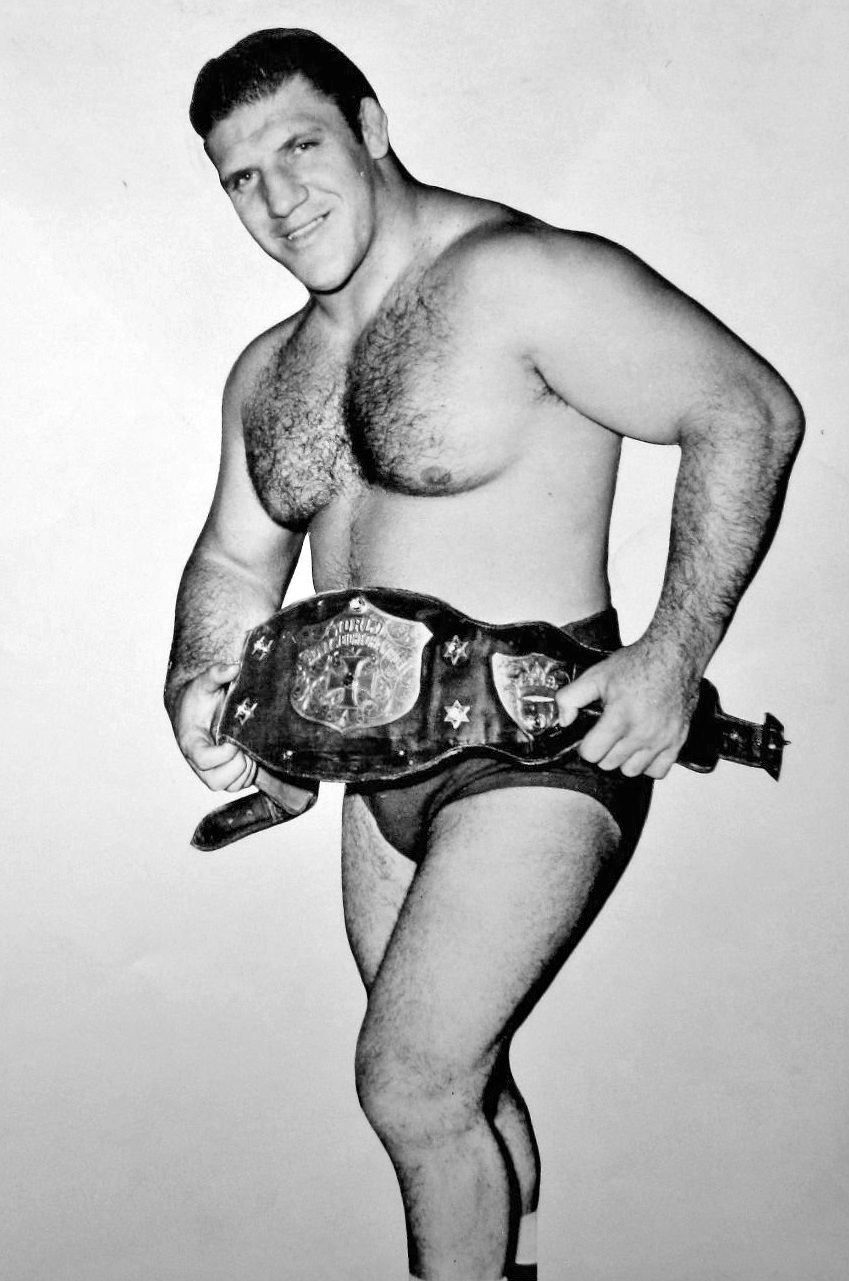
Bruno Sammartino

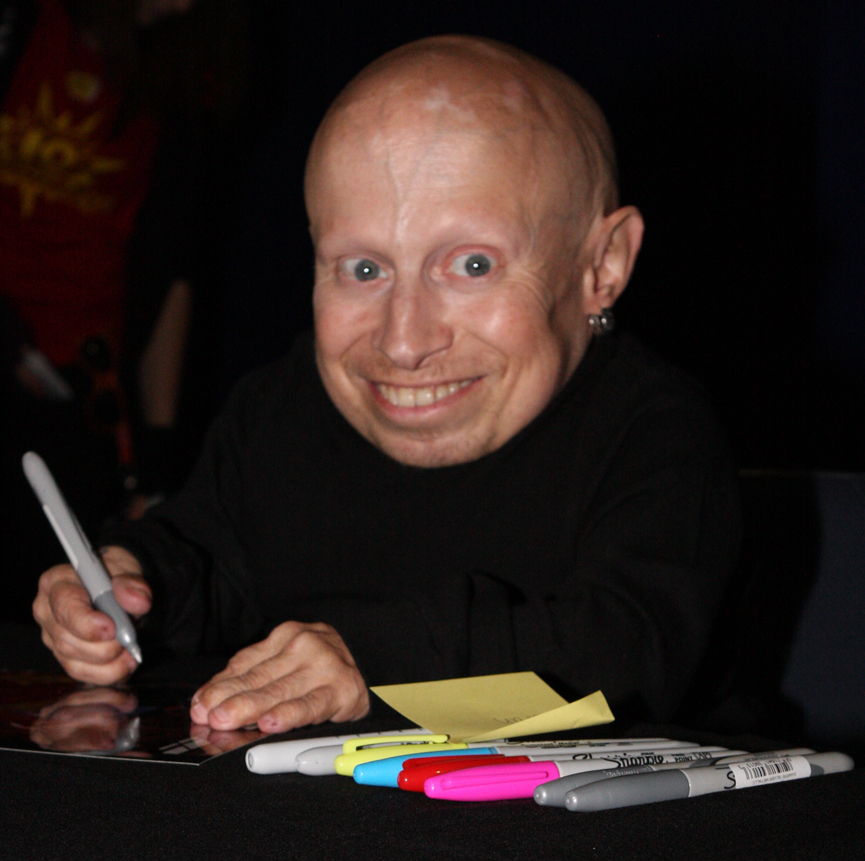
Verne Troyer

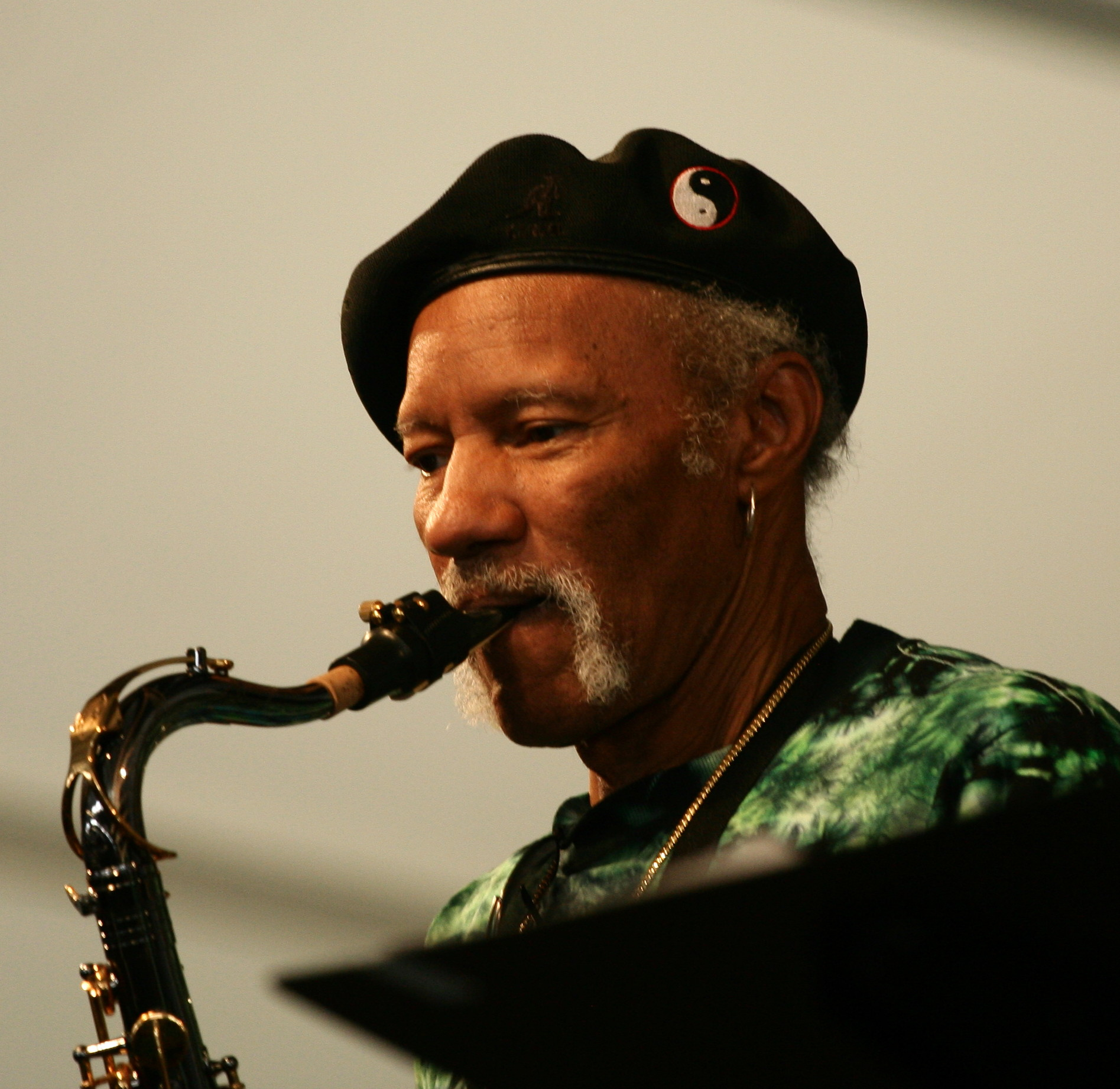
Charles Neville

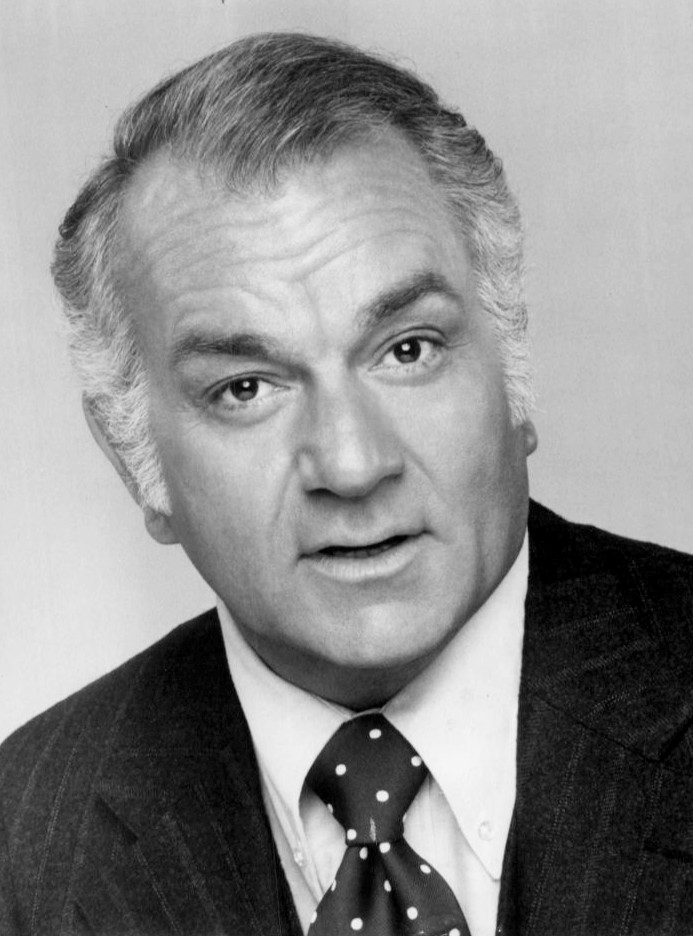
Robert Mandan

- April 1
  - Amsale Aberra, Ethiopian-born American fashion designer (b. 1953)
  - Bob Beattie, skiing coach and sports commentator (b. 1933)
  - Steven Bochco, American television producer and writer (b. 1943)
  - Foster Diebold, American academic (b. 1932)
  - Robert F. Gatje, American architect (b. 1927)
  - Audrey Morris, American jazz singer and pianist (b. 1928)
- April 2
  - Susan Anspach, American actress (b. 1942)
  - Clyde Billington Jr., American politician (b. 1934)
  - P. L. Thibaut Brian, American chemical engineer (b. 1931)
  - Alton Ford, American basketball player (b. 1982)
  - Morris Halle, Latvian-born linguist (b. 1923)
  - Tuiloma Pule Lameko, Samoan politician (b. 1934)
  - Connie Lawn, American journalist (b. 1945)
  - Bill Rademacher, American football player (b. 1942)
  - Laura Roslof, American illustrator (b. 1948)
  - Burton Smith, American computer scientist (b. 1941)
- April 3
  - Ron Dunbar, American songwriter (b. 1940)
  - David Edgerton, American entrepreneur, co-founder of Burger King (b. 1928)
  - David J. Foulis, American mathematician (b. 1931)
  - Eugene M. Grant, American real estate mogul (b. 1919)
  - Mary Hatcher, American actress (b. 1930)
  - Dale Haupt, American football coach (b. 1930)
  - Charles McDew, American professor and civil rights activist (b. 1938)
- April 4
  - David Bonetti, American art critic (b. 1947)
  - Burt Boyar, American voice actor and author (b. 1927)
  - Don Cherry, American singer and golfer (b. 1924)
  - Gertrude Jeannette, American actress (b. 1915)
  - C. Shannon Mallory, American Anglican prelate (b. 1936)
  - Soon-Tek Oh, South-Korean-American actor (b. 1932)
  - Stuart Pottasch, American astronomer (b. 1932)
  - Johnny Valiant, American professional wrestler and manager (b. 1946)
- April 5
  - Tim O'Connor, American actor (b. 1927)
  - Frederick D. Reese, American civil rights activist, teacher, and minister (b. 1929)
  - Cecil Taylor, American pianist and poet (b. 1929)
- April 6
  - Daniel Akaka, educator and politician (b. 1924)
  - Dorothy Garlock, American historical romance author (b. 1920)
  - Donald McKayle, American dancer and choreographer (b. 1931)
- April 7
  - Agni Vlavianos Arvanitis, American biologist (b. 1936)
  - Gerald Ayres, American studio executive and film producer (b. 1936)
  - Samuel B. McKinney, American civil rights activist and pastor (b. 1926)
- April 8
  - Nathan Davis, American jazz musician (b. 1937)
  - Chuck McCann, American actor (b. 1934)
  - Joe McConnell, American sports announcer (b. 1939)
- April 9
  - Barney A. Ebsworth, American business executive and art collector (b. 1934)
  - Jonathan M. Hess, American philologist (b. 1965)
  - Kimberly G. Smith, American biologist (b. 1948)
- April 10
  - Yvonne Staples, American singer (b. 1937)
  - Jean Marzollo, American children's author (b. 1943)
  - J. D. McClatchy, American poet (b. 1945)
  - Richard Muth, American economist, gallbladder cancer (b. 1928)
  - Alastair Rellie, British intelligence officer (b. 1935)
  - Matthew Stark, American civil rights activist (b. 1930)
- April 11
  - Karen Dawisha, American political scientist and writer (b. 1950)
  - Patrick F. McManus, American writer (b. 1934)
  - Mauro Panaggio, American basketball coach (b. 1934)
  - Mitzi Shore, American comedy club owner (b. 1931)
  - Alexander Welsh, American literary scholar (b. 1934)
  - Kevin Wortman, American ice hockey player (b. 1969)
- April 13
  - Art Bell, American broadcaster and author (b. 1945)
  - Miloš Forman, Czech and American film director (b. 1932)
  - William Nack, American journalist and author (b. 1941)
- April 14
  - David Buckel, American LGBT rights lawyer (b. 1958)
  - Daedra Charles, American basketball player (b. 1969)
  - Hal Greer, American Hall of Fame basketball player (b. 1937)
  - Sam Hamill, American poet and publisher (b. 1944)
  - Michael D. Healy, American military officer (b. 1927)
  - Robert Holmes, American football player (b. 1946)
  - Gerald Nachman, American journalist and author (b. 1938)
  - Kirk Simon, American documentarian (b. 1955)
- April 15 – R. Lee Ermey, American actor (b. 1944)
- April 16 – Harry Anderson, American actor and magician (b. 1952)
- April 17 – Barbara Bush, First Lady of the United States (b. 1925)
- April 18 – Bruno Sammartino, Italian-American professional wrestler (b. 1935)
- April 19
  - Allan Campbell, American microbiologist (b. 1930)
  - John Duffie, American baseball player (b. 1946)
  - Walter Moody, American convicted murderer (b. 1935)
  - Gil Santos, American sportscaster (b. 1938)
- April 20
  - George Alusik, American baseball player (b. 1935)
  - Earle Bruce, American football coach (b. 1931)
  - John Petercuskie, American football coach (b. 1925)
  - James F. Sirmons, American broadcasting executive (b. 1918)
  - Al Swift, American broadcaster and politician (b. 1936)
  - Charles Zwick, American civil servant (b. 1927)
- April 21
  - Dee Hardison, American football player (b. 1957)
  - Robert Kates, American geographer (b. 1929)
  - Jim Miceli, American politician (b. 1935)
  - Verne Troyer, American actor (b. 1969)
- April 22
  - Ken Hofmann, American businessman (b. 1923)
  - Richard Jenrette, American investor (b. 1929)
  - Dave Nelson, American baseball player and broadcaster (b. 1944)
  - Charlie Rice, American jazz drummer (b. 1920)
  - Kona Schwenke, American football player(b. 1993)
  - Hoyt Patrick Taylor Jr., American politician (b. 1924)
- April 23
  - Don Bustany, American radio and television broadcaster (b. 1929)
  - Bennie Cunningham, American football player (b. 1955)
  - Bob Dorough, American pianist, singer and composer (b. 1923)
  - Jerrold Meinwald, American chemist (b. 1927)
  - Alice Provensen, American children's illustrator and writer (b. 1919)
  - Arthur B. Rubinstein, American composer (b. 1938)
  - Bob Schermerhorn, American college basketball coach (b. 1943)
  - Art Simmons, American jazz pianist (b. 1926)
  - Arthur R.G. Solmssen, American novelist (b. 1929)
  - Edward W. Tayler, American literary scholar (b. 1931)
  - Leland B. Yeager, American economist (b. 1925)
- April 24
  - Marv Rackley, American baseball player (b. 1922)
  - Quentin Sickels, American football player (b. 1927)
  - Susan Williams, American marine biologist (b. 1952)
- April 26 – Charles Neville, American R&B and jazz musician (b. 1938)
- April 27
  - Kristin Nelson, American actress, painter and author (b. 1945)
  - Paul Junger Witt, American film and television producer (b. 1941)
- April 28 – Larry Harvey, artist and philanthropist (b. 1948)
- April 29 – Robert Mandan, American actor (b. 1932)
- April 30
  - Tim Calvert, American rock guitarist (b. 1966)
  - Joel Kovel, American environmentalist and anti-war activist (b. 1937)
  - Ralph Stephan, American rower (b. 1929)
  - David Wiegand, American journalist (b. 1948)

=== May ===
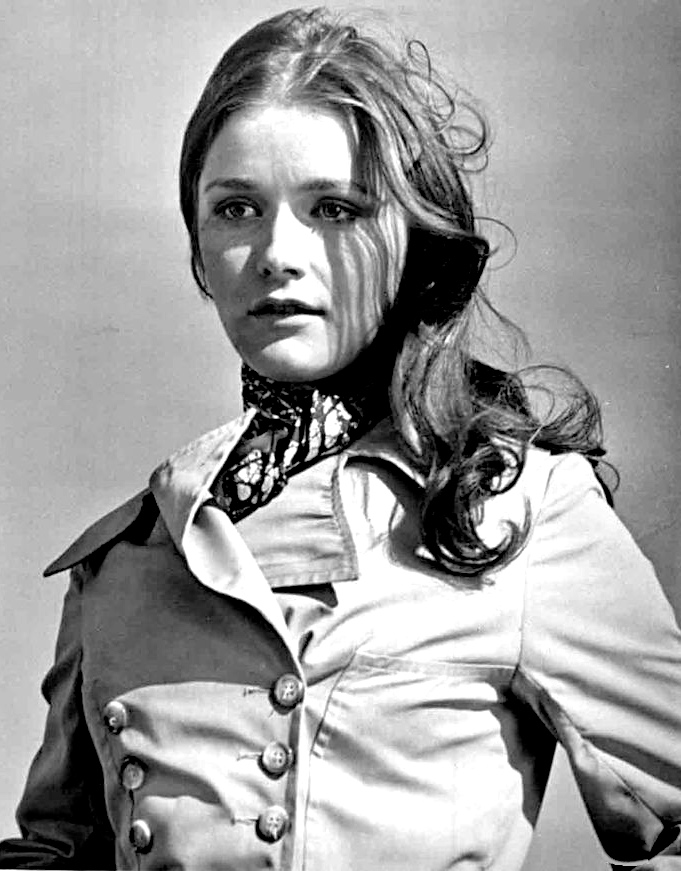
Margot Kidder

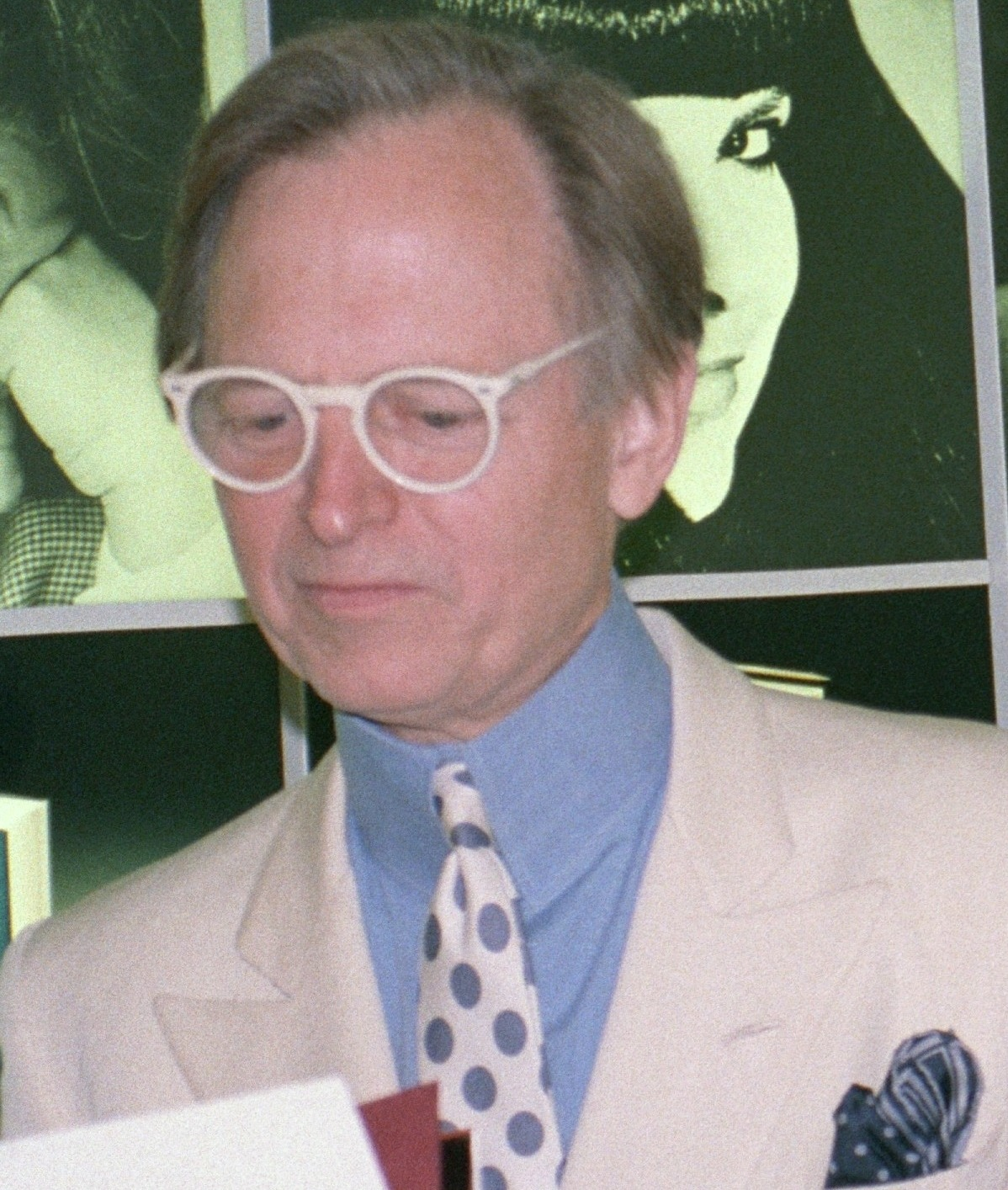
Tom Wolfe

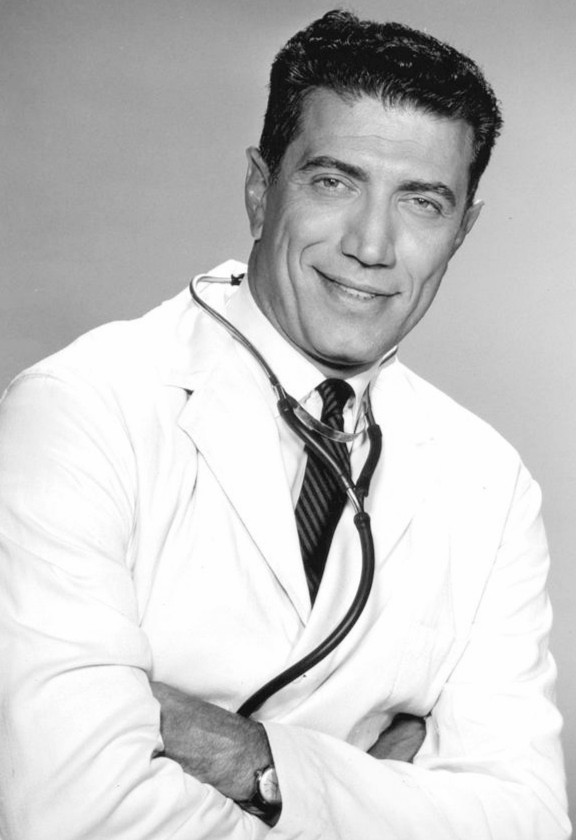
Joseph Campanella

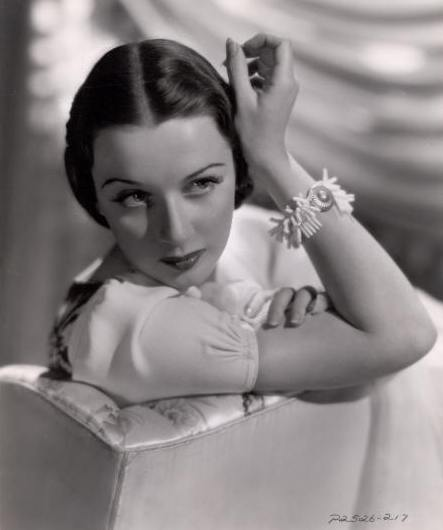
Patricia Morison

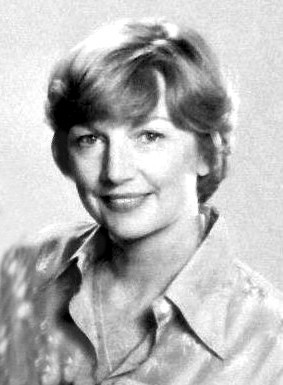
Allyn Ann McLerie

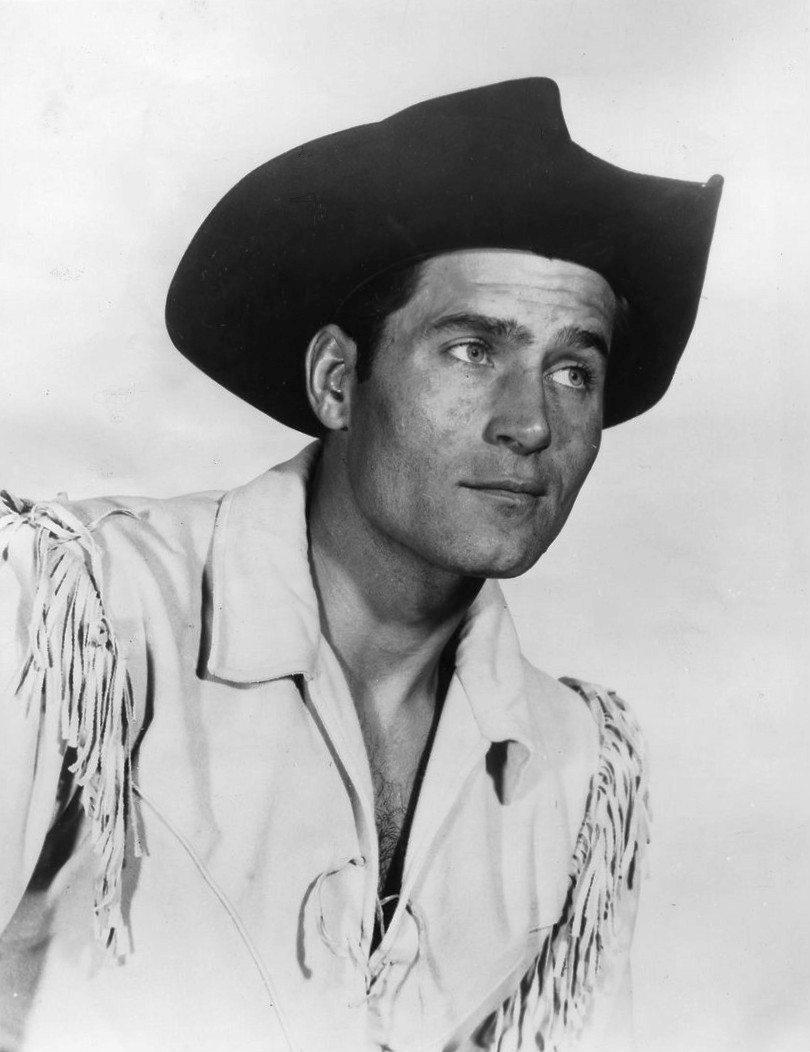
Clint Walker

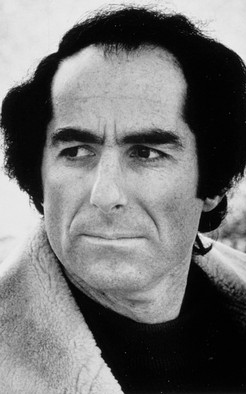
Philip Roth

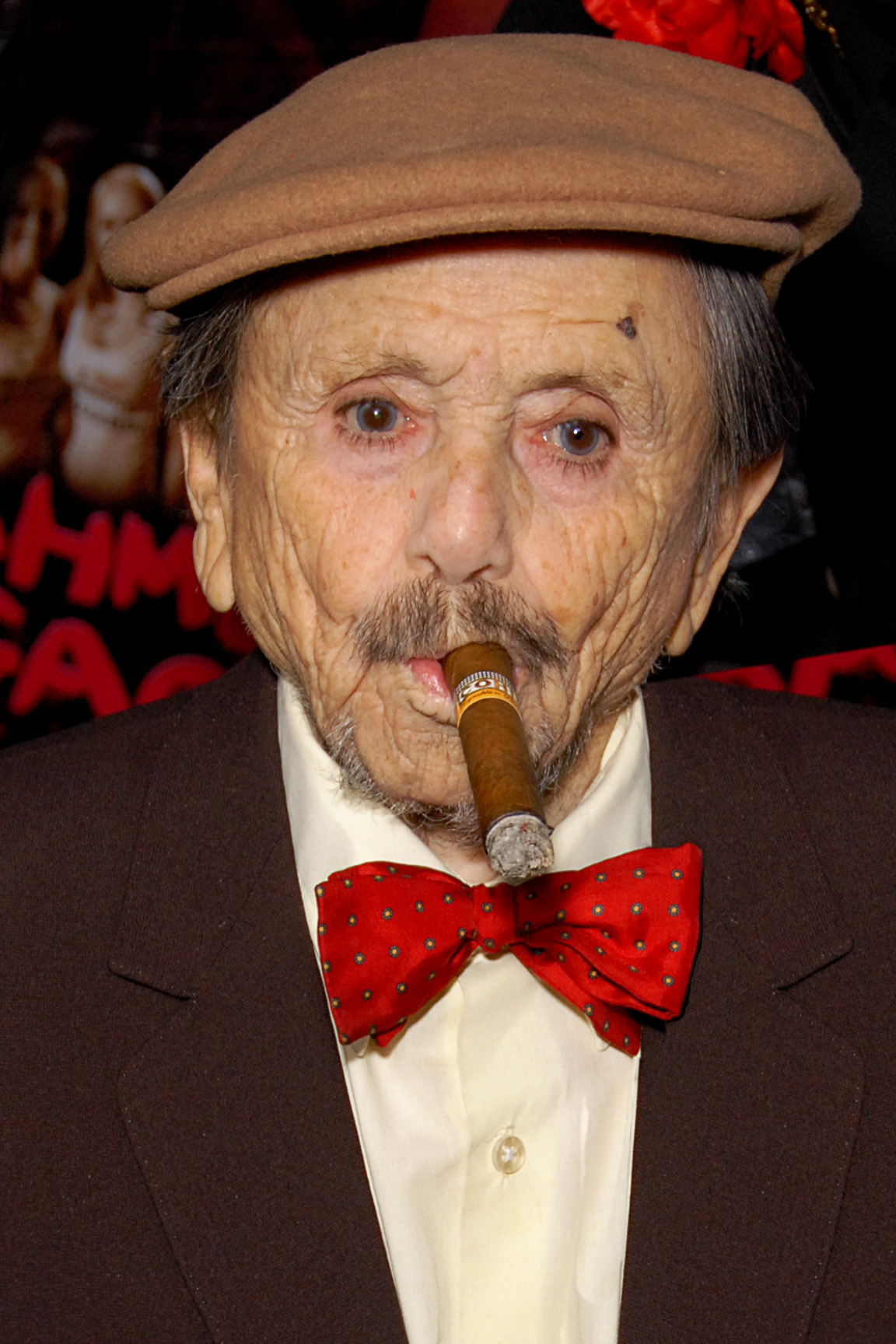
Jerry Maren

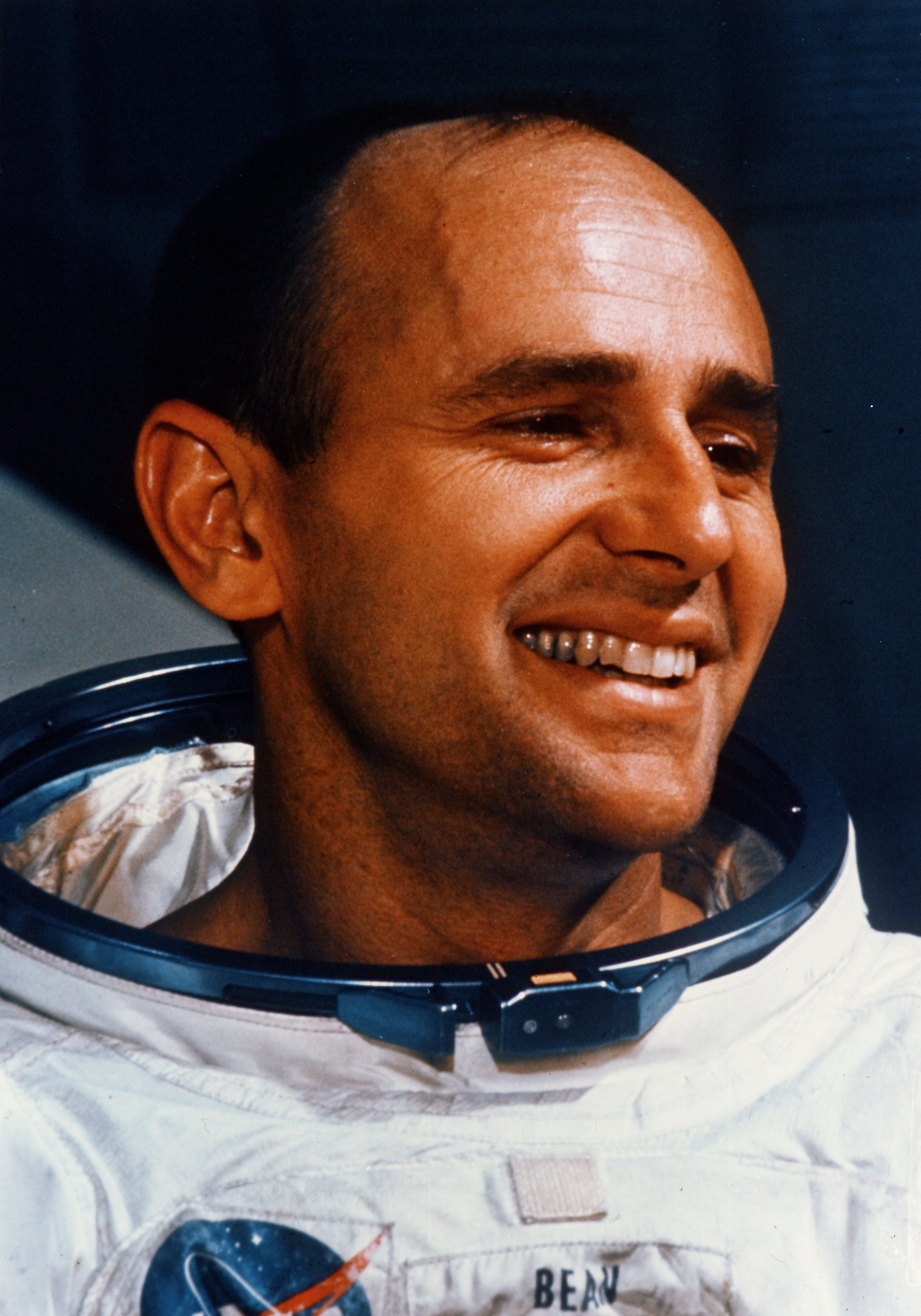
Alan Bean

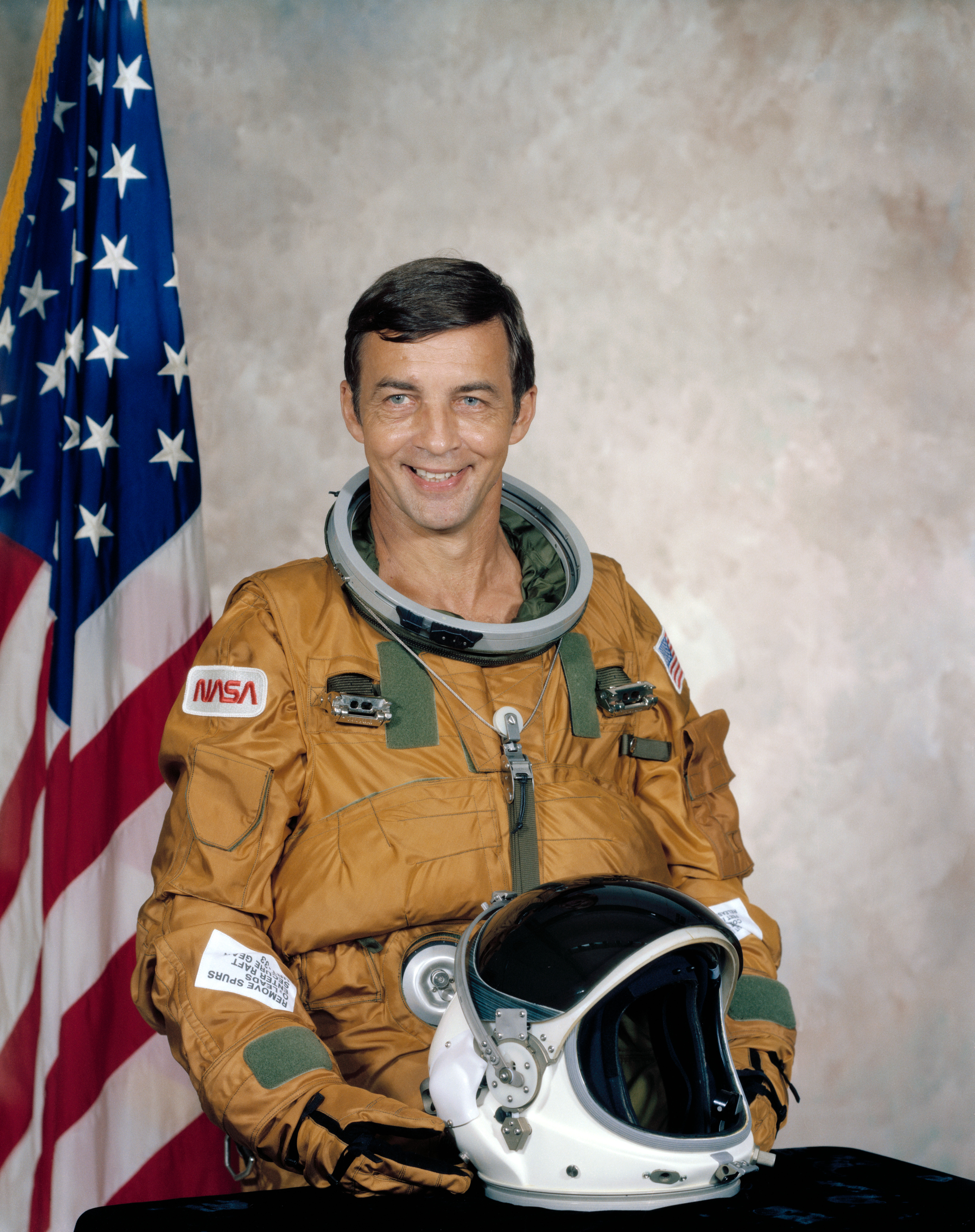
Donald H. Peterson

- May 1
  - Arthur Barnard, American sprinter and Olympic bronze medalist (b. 1929)
  - Dennis Claridge, American football player (b. 1942)
  - Ninalee Craig, American-born Canadian teacher (b. 1928)
  - Carl W. Duckworth, American politician (b. 1955)
  - Raymond D. Dzendzel, American politician (b. 1922)
  - Phil Gowan, American historian (b. 1953)
  - Robert B. Kennedy, American politician (b. 1940)
  - Chuck Missler, American evangelist and author (b. 1935)
  - John "Jabo" Starks, American drummer (b. 1937)
  - Betty Workman, American politician (b. 1925)
- May 2
  - Dick Edell, American lacrosse coach (b. 1944)
  - James Thorp, American electrical engineer (b. 1937)
  - Chris Walsh, American politician (b. 1952)
- May 3
  - Jim Argue, American politician (b. 1952)
  - Davida Coady, American pediatrician (b. 1938)
  - Dan Grimm, American football player (b. 1941)
  - David Pines, American physicist (b. 1925)
  - Bob Prewitt, American college basketball coach (b. 1925)
  - Junior Rodriguez, American politician (b. 1936)
  - Joe Scannella, American football coach (b. 1929)
- May 4
  - Steve Coy, British-English musician (Dead or Alive), (b. 1962)
  - Paul Bloodgood, American artist (b. 1960)
  - Edwin G. Burrows, American historian and professor (b. 1944)
  - Bobbie Louise Hawkins, American poet and author (b. 1931)
  - Larry Hunter, American college basketball coach (b. 1949)
- May 5
  - Frederic H. Dustin, American businessman and philanthropist (b. 1930)
  - Stanley Falkow, American microbiologist (b. 1934)
  - Wilson Frost, American politician (b. 1926)
  - Aaron D. Panken, American rabbi (b. 1965)
  - Dick Williams, American singer (b. 1926)
  - Roy Wright, American baseball player (b. 1934)
- May 6
  - Sam Aanestad, American politician (b. 1947)
  - Raymond Book, American politician (b. 1925)
  - Dick Casull, American gunsmith (b. 1931)
  - Daniel Cohen, American writer (b. 1936)
  - Charles W. Steger, American academic (b. 1948)
  - Brad Steiger, American author and paranormal researcher (b. 1936)
  - Ray Szmanda, American radio personality (b. 1927)
- May 7
  - Crosbie E. Saint, American military officer (b. 1937)
  - Gayle Shepherd, American singer (Shepherd Sisters), (b. 1936)
  - Scott Wilson, American bodybuilder (b. 1950)
- May 8
  - Anne V. Coates, British film editor (b. 1925)
  - George Deukmejian, politician; Governor of California (1983–1991) (b. 1928)
- May 9
  - Poldine Carlo, American writer (b. 1921)
  - Tom Dooley, American football referee (b. 1935)
  - Tom Fletcher, American baseball player (b. 1943)
  - Richard Haag, American landscape architect (b. 1924)
- May 12
  - Billy Brewer, American football player and coach (b. 1935)
  - Nick Drahos, American football player (b. 1919)
  - Geoffrey Hendricks, American artist (b. 1932)
  - Chuck Knox, American football coach (b. 1932)
  - Donald Gary Young, American business executive (b. 1949)
- May 13 – Margot Kidder, Canadian-American actress and activist (b. 1948)
- May 14 – Tom Wolfe, author and journalist (b. 1930)
- May 15 – Joseph G. Clemons, American soldier (b. 1928)
- May 16
  - Joseph Campanella, American actor (b. 1924)
  - Hugh Dane, American actor (b. 1942)
- May 17
  - Skip Finn, American Ojibwe politician (b. 1949)
  - Craig Harbison, American art historian (b. 1944)
  - Lawrence Jegen, American legal scholar (b. 1935)
  - Anthony Michael Milone, American Roman Catholic prelate (b. 1933)
  - Jon Sholle, American musician (b. 1948)
  - Tom Von Ruden, American athlete (b. 1945)
- May 19 – Robert Indiana, American artist (b. 1928)
- May 20
  - Richard N. Goodwin, American writer (b. 1931)
  - Patricia Morison, American actress (b. 1915)
- May 21
  - Dovey Johnson Roundtree, civil rights activist, ordained minister, and attorney (b. 1914)
  - Allyn Ann McLerie, Canadian-American actress, singer, and dancer (b. 1926)
  - Clint Walker, American actor (b. 1927)
- May 22 – Philip Roth, American writer (b. 1933)
- May 24 – Jerry Maren, American actor (b. 1920)
- May 25 – Bill Mallory, American football player and coach (Indiana Hoosiers, Miami RedHawks, Colorado Buffaloes), (b. 1935)
- May 26
  - Alan Bean, astronaut (b. 1932)
  - Ted Dabney, electrical engineer and co-founder of Atari, Inc (b. 1937)
- May 27
  - John DiFronzo, American mobster (b. 1929)
  - Gardner Dozois, American science fiction writer and editor (b. 1948)
  - Connie Kurtz, American LGBT rights activist (b. 1937)
  - Russell Nype, American actor and singer (b. 1920)
  - Donald H. Peterson, American astronaut (b. 1933)
  - Russ Regan, American music business executive (b. 1929)
- May 28
  - Rachel Rockwell, American actress and choreographer (b. 1969)
  - Chuck Stevens, American baseball player (b. 1919)
  - Dick Tuck, American political prankster (b. 1924)
  - Cliff Tucker, American basketball player (b. 1989)
  - Scott R. White, American materials scientist (b. 1963)
- May 29
  - Ray Barker, American baseball player (b. 1936)
  - James Schaefer, American politician (b. 1939)
  - René Yañez, Mexican-born American artist (b. 1943)
- May 30
  - Baruch Brody, American bioethicist (b. 1943)
  - Mel Weinberg, American con artist and police informant (b. 1925)
- May 31
  - Ella Brennan, American restaurateur (b. 1926)
  - Steven Pitt, American forensic psychiatrist (b. 1959)
  - Joe E. White, American educator (b. 1938)

=== June ===
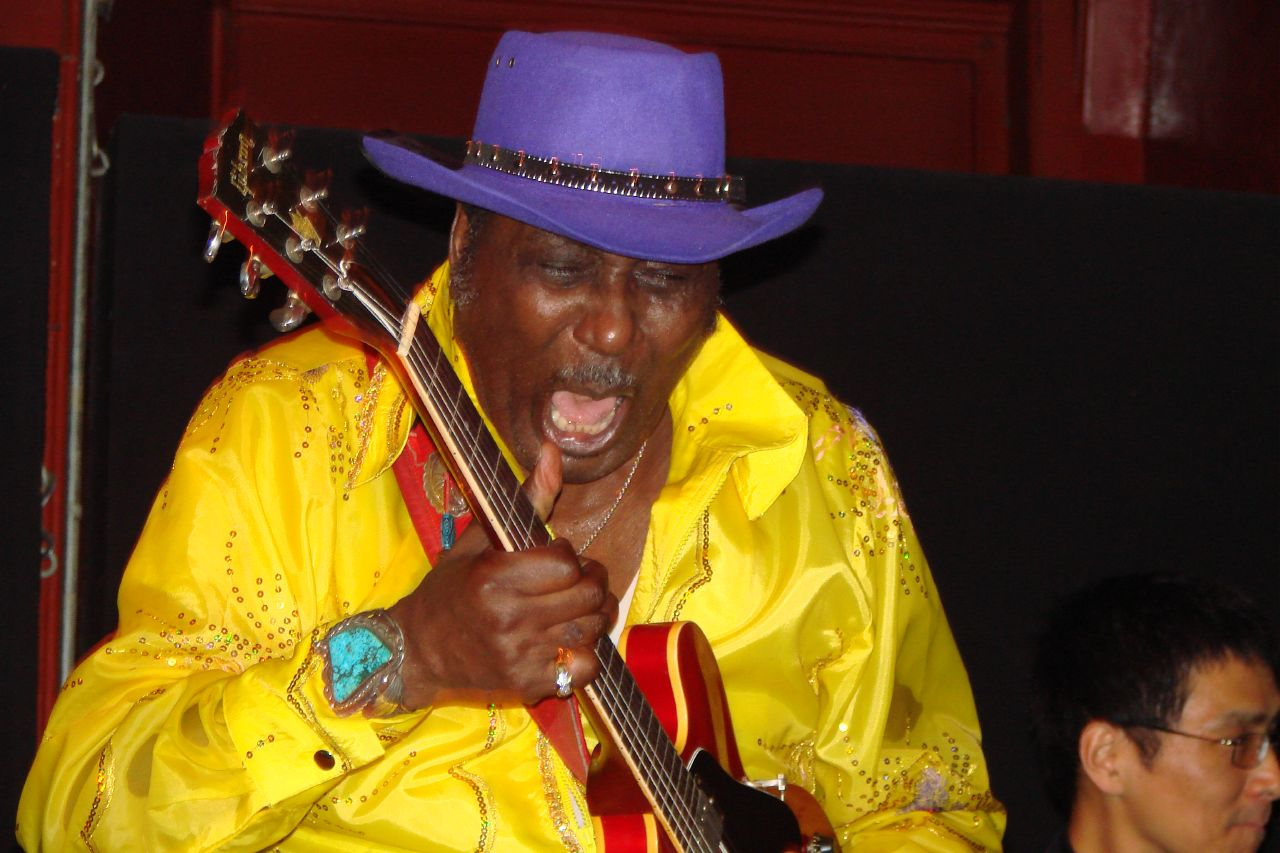
Eddy Clearwater

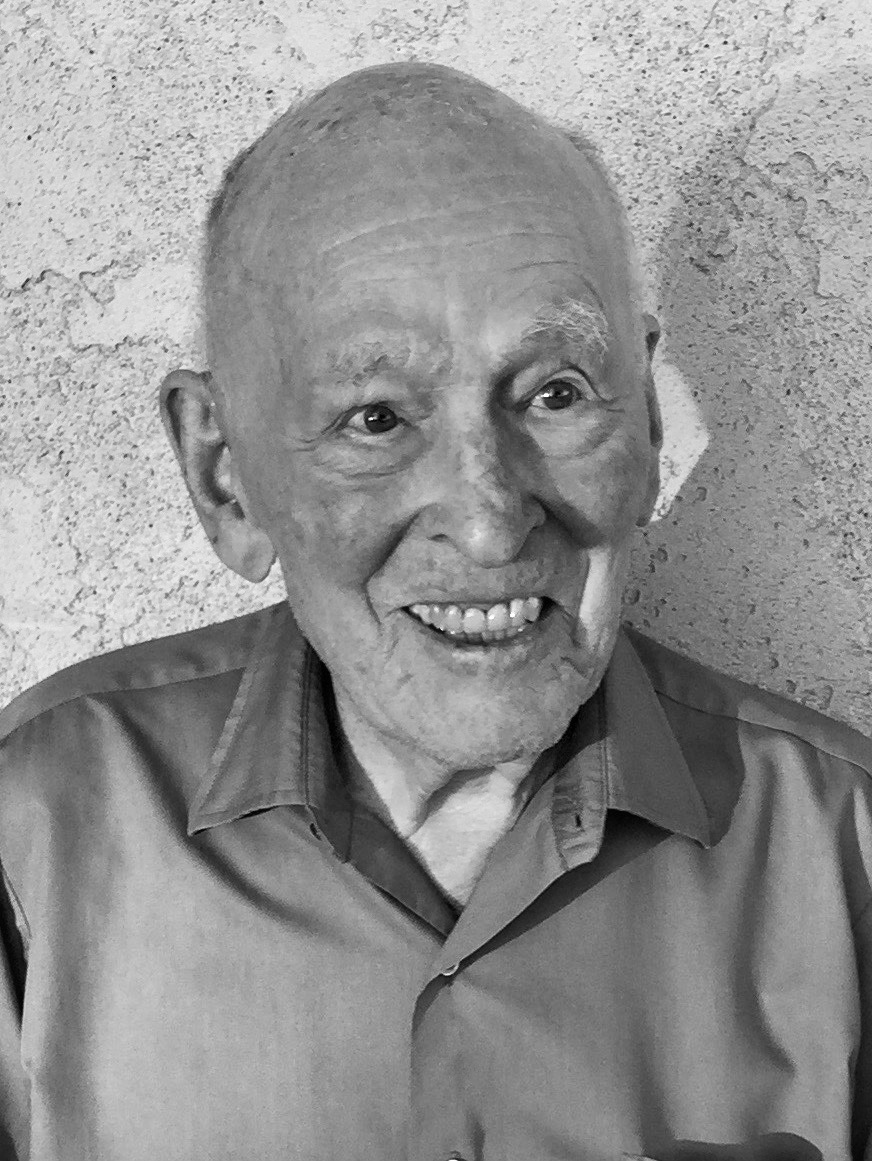
Paul D. Boyer

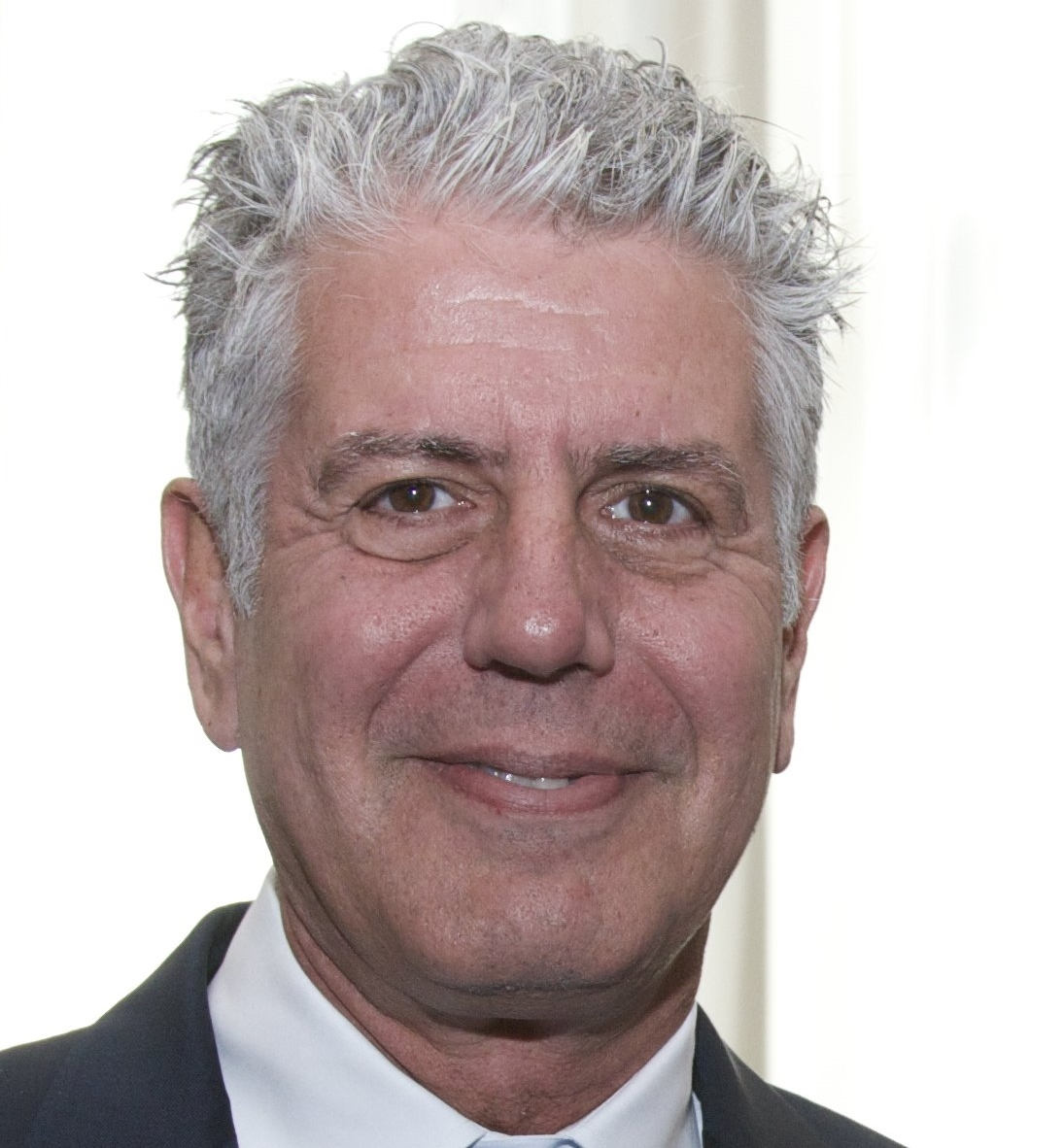
Anthony Bourdain

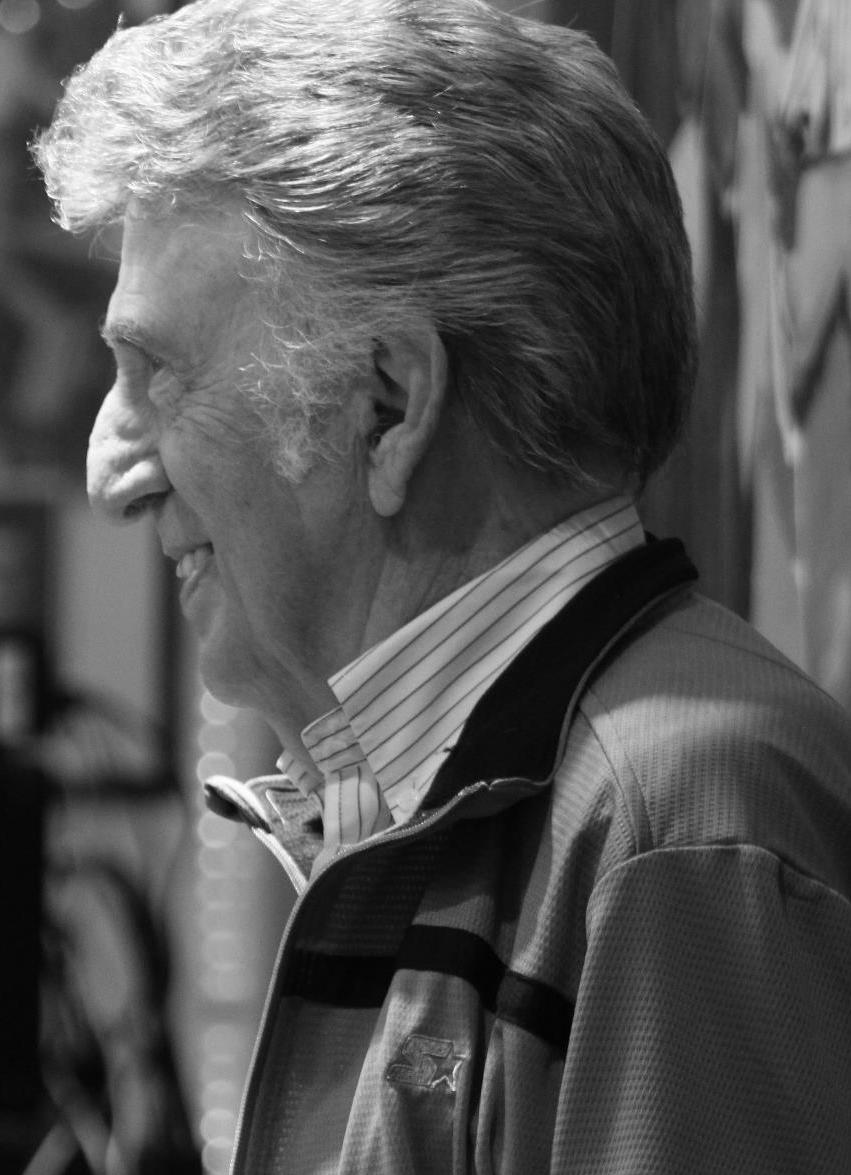
D. J. Fontana

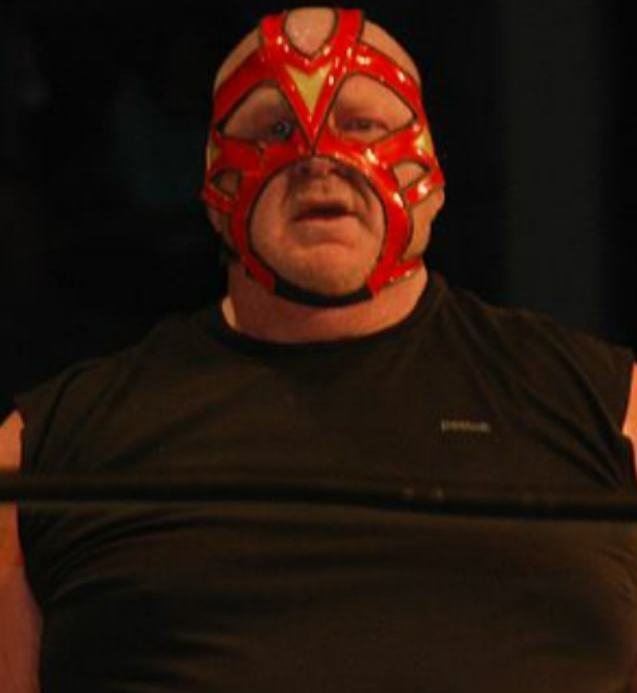
Big Van Vader

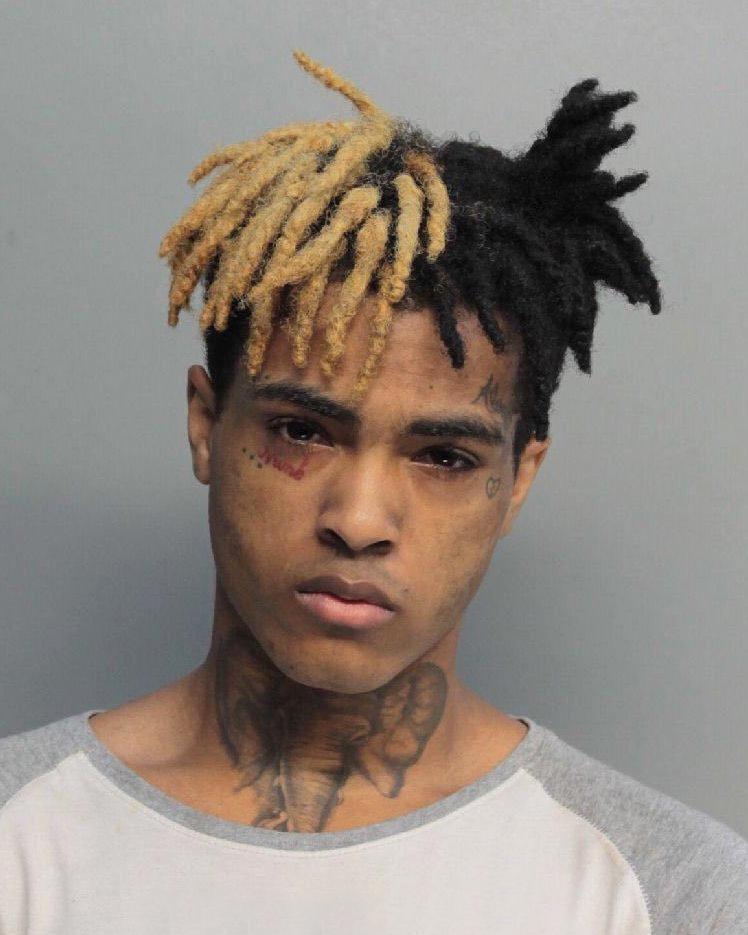
XXXTentacion

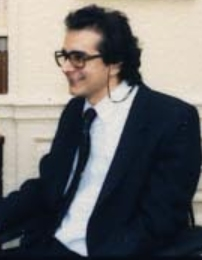
Charles Krauthammer

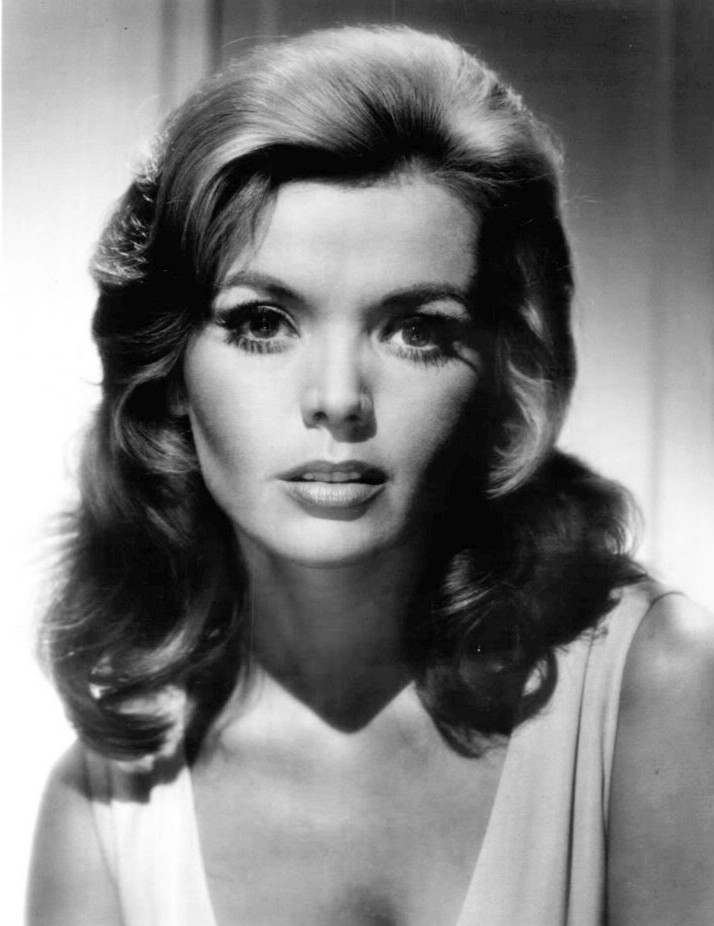
Deanna Lund

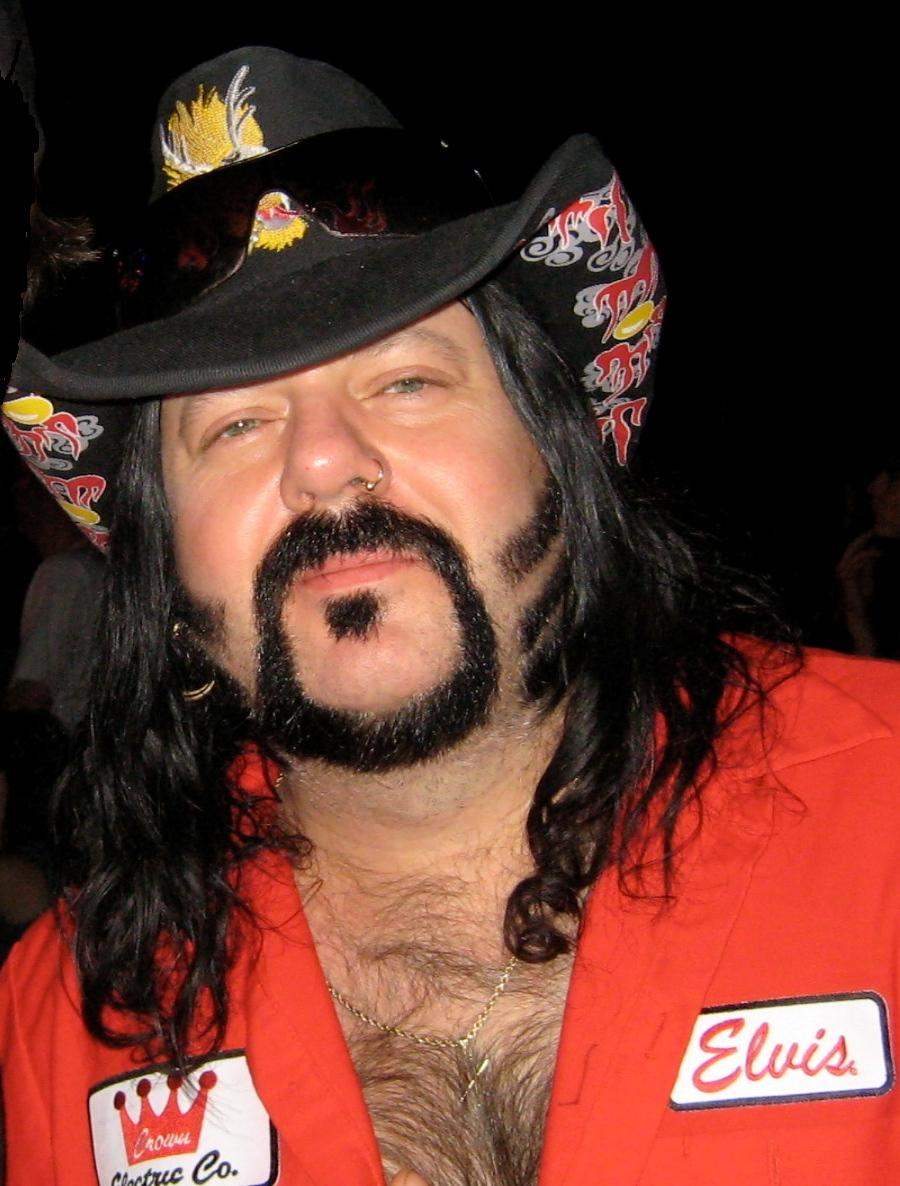
Vinnie Paul

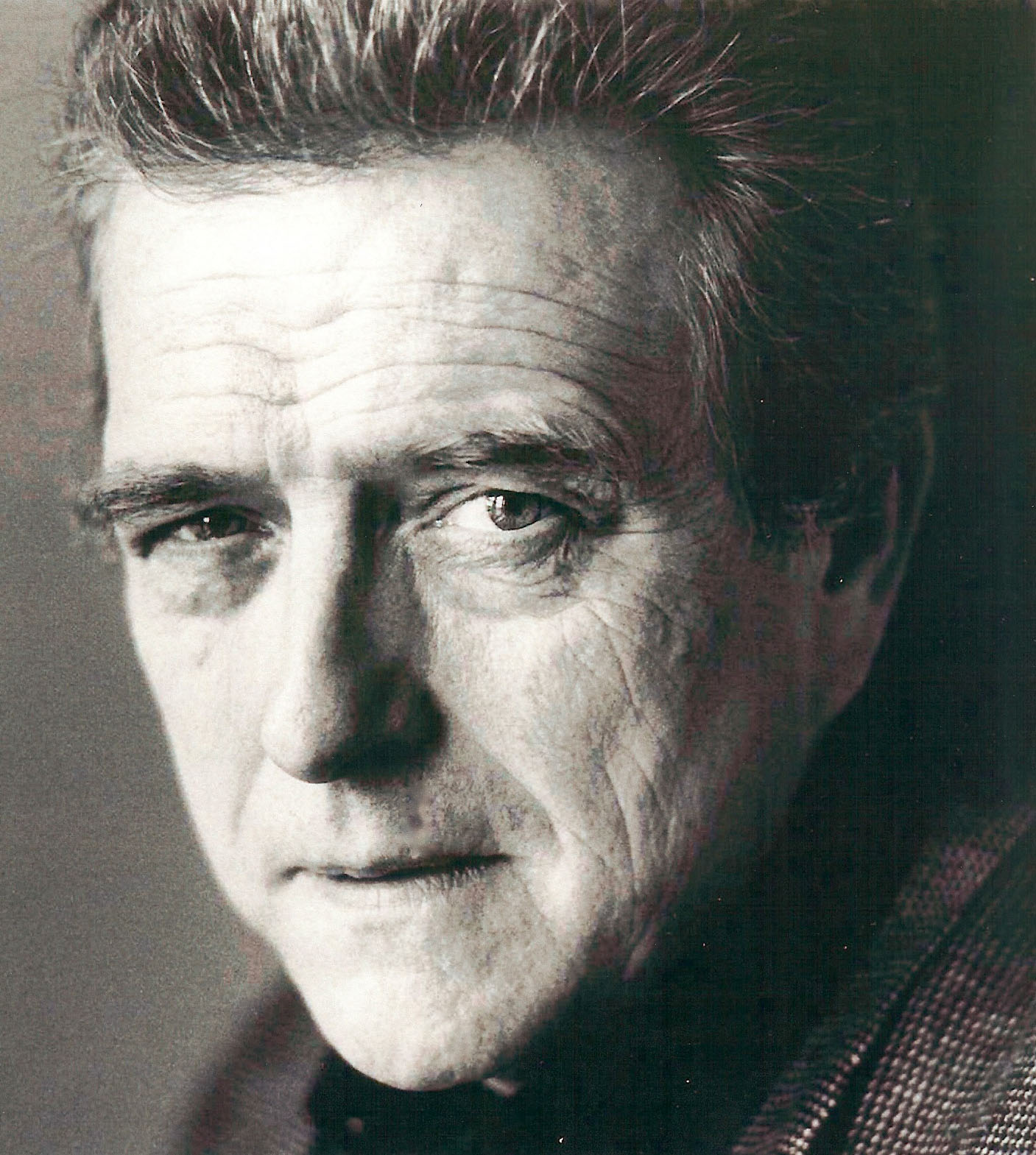
Stanley Anderson

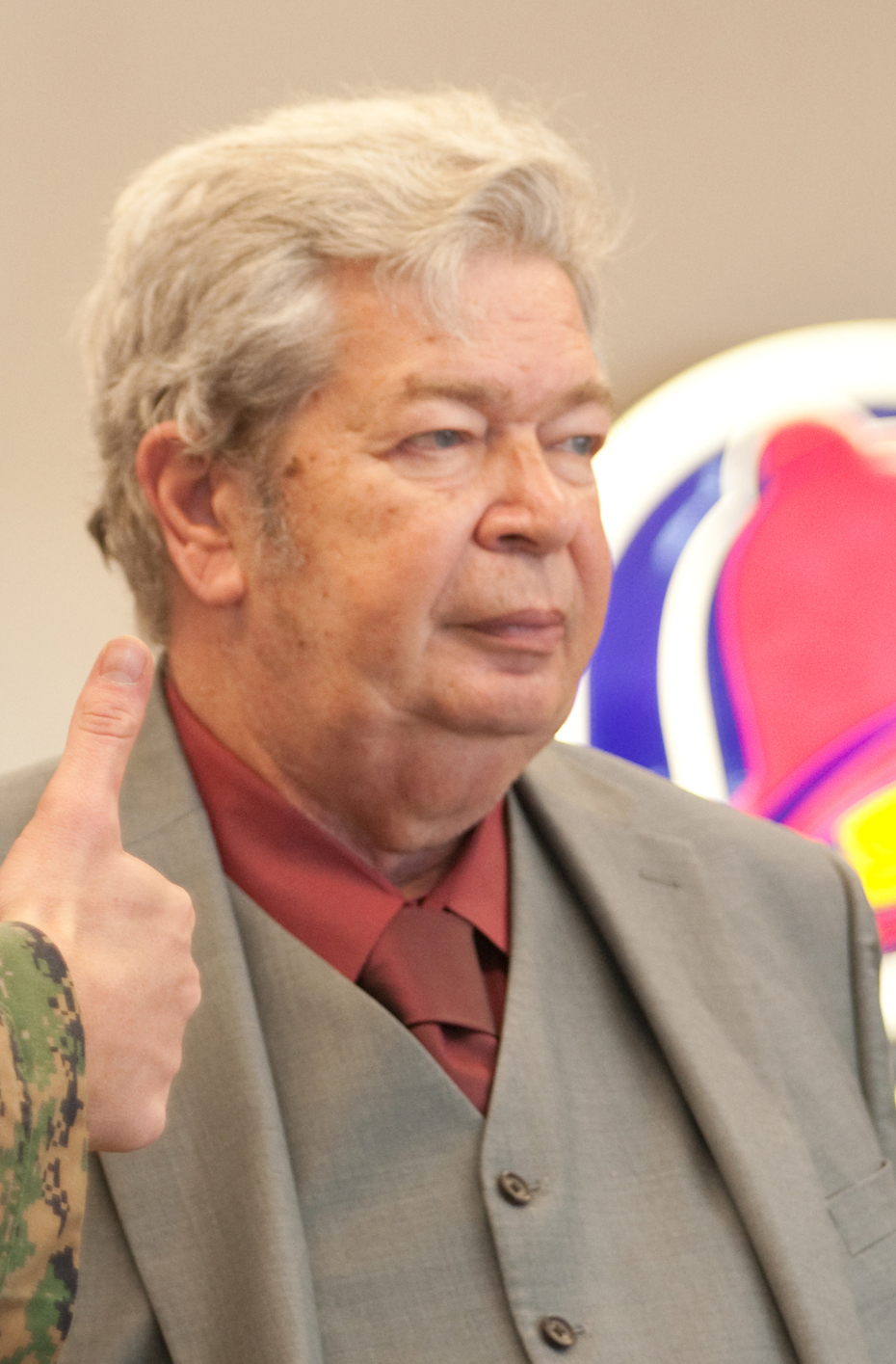
Richard Harrison

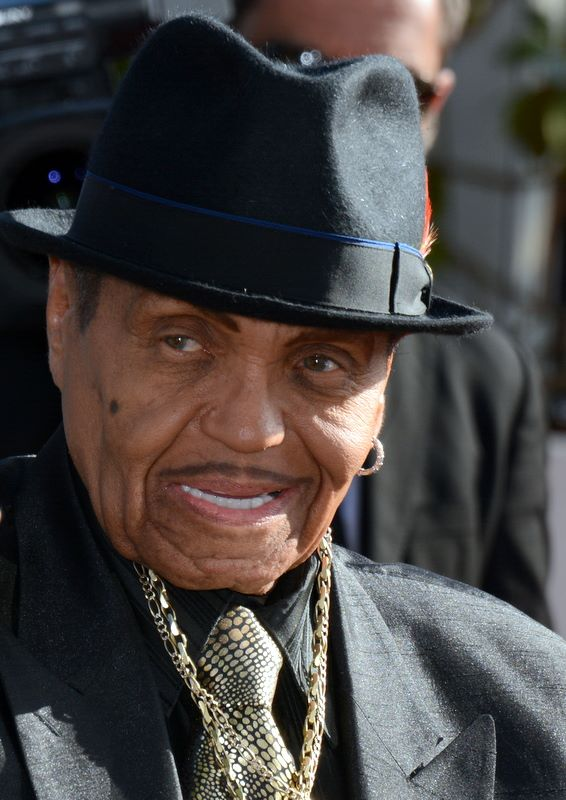
Joe Jackson

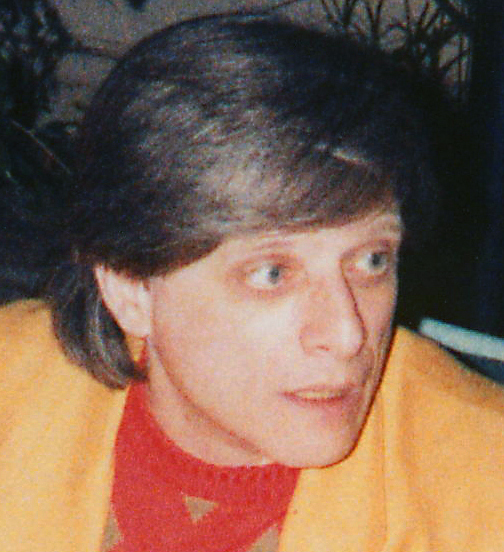
Harlan Ellison

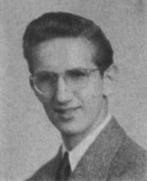
Steve Ditko

- June 1
  - Eddy Clearwater, American musician and singer (b. 1935)
  - Bob Clotworthy, American Hall of Fame diver (b. 1931)
  - Andrew Massey, British-born American conductor (b. 1946)
  - Sam Moore, American Bible publisher (b. 1929)
  - William Edward Phipps, American actor (b. 1922)
  - Rockin' Rebel, American professional wrestler (b. 1966)
  - Fred Van Dusen, American baseball player (b. 1937)
- June 2
  - Mary Baumgartner, American baseball player (b. 1930)
  - Paul D. Boyer, American biochemist (b. 1918)
  - Bruce Kison, American baseball player (b. 1950)
  - Nick Meglin, American magazine editor (b. 1935)
  - Irving Sandler, American art critic (b. 1925)
  - William Simmons, American anthropologist (b. 1938)
  - C. C. Torbert Jr., American jurist (b. 1929)
  - Bernard E. Trainor, American journalist and Marine Corps general (b. 1928)
- June 3
  - Clarence Fountain, American singer, founder of The Blind Boys of Alabama (b. 1929)
  - Frank Carlucci, American politician (b. 1930)
  - Jerry Hopkins, American journalist (b. 1936)
  - Johnnie Keyes, American pornographic actor (b. 1940)
  - Kent McCray, American television producer (b. 1929)
- June 4
  - Dwight Clark, American football player (b. 1957)
  - Jeffrey Coy, American politician (b. 1951)
  - Norman Edge, American jazz double-bassist (b. 1934)
  - Mary Jane Fonder, 75, American convicted murderer (b. 1942)
  - Georgann Johnson, American actress (b. 1926)
  - Steve Kline, American baseball player (b. 1947)
  - C. M. Newton, American college basketball coach and administrator (b. 1930)
  - Jalal Mansur Nuriddin, American poet and musician (b. 1944)
- June 5 – Kate Spade, American fashion designer (b. 1962)
- June 7– David Douglas Duncan, American photojournalist (b. 1916)
- June 8 – Anthony Bourdain, celebrity chef, author and television personality (b. 1956).
- June 9
  - Joan Bernard Armstrong, American judge (b. 1941)
  - Richard H. Bube, American physicist (b. 1928)
  - Kristine Ciesinski, American opera singer (b. 1953)
  - Murray Fromson, American journalist and professor (b. 1930)
  - Crawford Gates, American composer and conductor (b. 1922)
  - Lorraine Gordon, American jazz club owner (b. 1923)
  - John Wesley Hanes III, American civil servant (b. 1925)
  - Kenyatta Jones, American football player (b. 1979)
  - Clemens Kalischer, American photojournalist (b. 1921)
- June 10
  - Neal E. Boyd, American Opera singer and winner of "America's Got Talent" (b. 1975)
  - Dorothy Cotton, American civil rights activist (b. 1930)
  - Harold L. Dibble, American archaeologist (b. 1952)
  - James Gips, American technologist (b. 1946)
  - Tom McEwen, American drag racer (b. 1937)
  - Edward Sadlowski, American labor activist (b. 1939)
  - Christopher Stasheff, American author (b. 1944)
- June 11
  - Wayne Dockery, American jazz double bassist (b. 1942)
  - Larry Thomas, American political advisor (b. 1948)
- June 12
  - Robert Alan Browne, American actor (b. 1932)
  - Keith Fahnhorst, American football player (b. 1952)
  - Jack Laxer, American photographer (b. 1927)
  - Al Meltzer, American sportscaster (b. 1929)
- June 13
  - Anne Donovan, American basketball player and coach (b. 1962)
  - D. J. Fontana, American musician (b. 1931)
  - Tom Gear, American politician (b. 1949)
  - J. Alex Haller, American pediatric surgeon (b. 1927)
  - Ronald I. Meshbesher, American lawyer (b. 1933)
  - Charles Vinci, American weightlifter (b. 1933)
- June 14
  - Ed Roebuck, American baseball player (b. 1932)
  - Mary K. Shell, American journalist and politician (b. 1927)
  - Marta Weigle, American folklorist and anthropologist (b. 1944)
- June 15 – Matt "Guitar" Murphy, American blues guitarist (b. 1929)
- June 16 – Martin Bregman, American film producer (b. 1926)
- June 17
  - Elizabeth Brackett, American television journalist (b. 1942)
  - O. Timothy O'Meara, American mathematician (b. 1928)
  - Rebecca Parris, American jazz singer (b. 1952)
  - Aihud Pevsner, American physicist (b. 1926)
  - Dutch Rennert, American baseball umpire (b. 1930)
  - Stephen E. Robinson, American religious scholar (b. 1948)
- June 18
  - Walter Bahr, American Hall of Fame soccer player (b. 1927)
  - Big Van Vader, American professional wrestler and football player (b. 1955)
  - Billy Connors, American baseball player (b. 1941)
  - Barry McDaniel, American opera singer (b. 1930)
  - Claude Ramsey, American politician (b. 1943)
  - Billy Sammeth, American talent manager (b. 1951)
  - Lawrence A. Skantze, 89, American military officer (b. 1928)
  - Jimmy Wopo, 21, American rapper (b. 1997)
  - XXXTentacion, rapper, singer and songwriter, gunshot wound (b. 1998)
- June 19
  - Hubert Green, American Hall of Fame golfer (b. 1947)
  - Stefan Kanfer, American journalist (b. 1933)
  - Bill Kenville, American basketball player (b. 1931)
  - Chuck Klingbeil, American football player (b. 1966)
  - Koko, American-bred Western lowland gorilla (b. 1971)
  - Don Mason, American baseball player (b. 1945)
  - Ian Orme, British-American microbiologist (b. 1953)
  - Jane Cronin Scanlon, American mathematician (b. 1923)
  - Lowrell Simon, American soul singer-songwriter (b. 1943)
  - Jack Stallings, American baseball coach (b. 1931)
  - Antwon Rose Jr., African-American man shot and killed by white police officer Michael Rosfeld in Pittsburgh (b. 2000)
- June 20
  - David Bianco, American record producer, engineer and mixer (b. 1954)
  - Dick Danehe, American football player (b. 1921)
  - Brian Donovan, American journalist (b. 1941)
  - Robert Gilpin, American political scientist (b. 1931)
  - Lesandro Guzman-Feliz, murder victim (b. 2002)
  - Bill Hendon, American politician (b. 1945)
  - Willie Lee Rose, American historian (b. 1927)
  - John Ward, sportscaster (Vol Network) (b. 1930)
- June 21
  - William Acker, American judge (b. 1928)
  - H. Tristram Engelhardt Jr., American philosopher (b. 1941)
  - Charles Krauthammer, columnist and political commentator (b. 1950)
  - George Lindemann, American businessman (b. 1937)
  - John Mack, American civic leader (b. 1937)
  - Bill Thompson, American politician (b. 1937)
- June 22
  - Deanna Lund, American actress (b. 1937)
  - Vinnie Paul, American drummer (b. 1964)
- June 23
  - Fred Chalenor, American bassist (b. 1956)
  - Donald Hall, American poet (b. 1929)
- June 24 – Stanley Anderson, American actor (b. 1939)
- June 25 – Richard Benjamin Harrison, American businessman and television personality (b. 1941)
- June 27 – Joe Jackson, American talent manager (b. 1928)
- June 28 – Harlan Ellison, American writer (b. 1934)
- June 29
  - Matt Cappotelli, American professional wrestler (b. 1979)
  - Bill Hamel, American composer and record producer (b. 1973)
  - Derrick O'Connor, Irish actor (b. 1941)
  - Eugene Pitt, American singer (b. 1938)
  - Steve Ditko, comics artist and writer (Marvel Comics) (b. 1927)
- June 30
  - John E. Casida, American entomologist and toxicologist (b. 1930)
  - Mike Heideman, American basketball coach (b. 1948)
  - Billy Kinard, American football player (b. 1934)
  - Timothy Murphy, American poet (b. 1951)

=== July ===
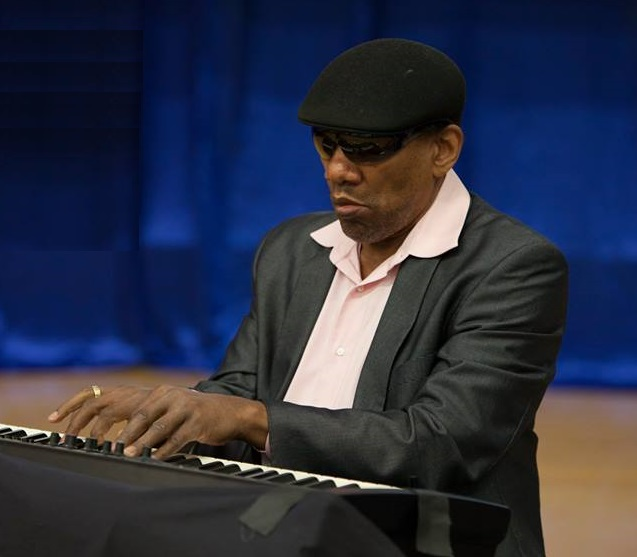
Henry Butler

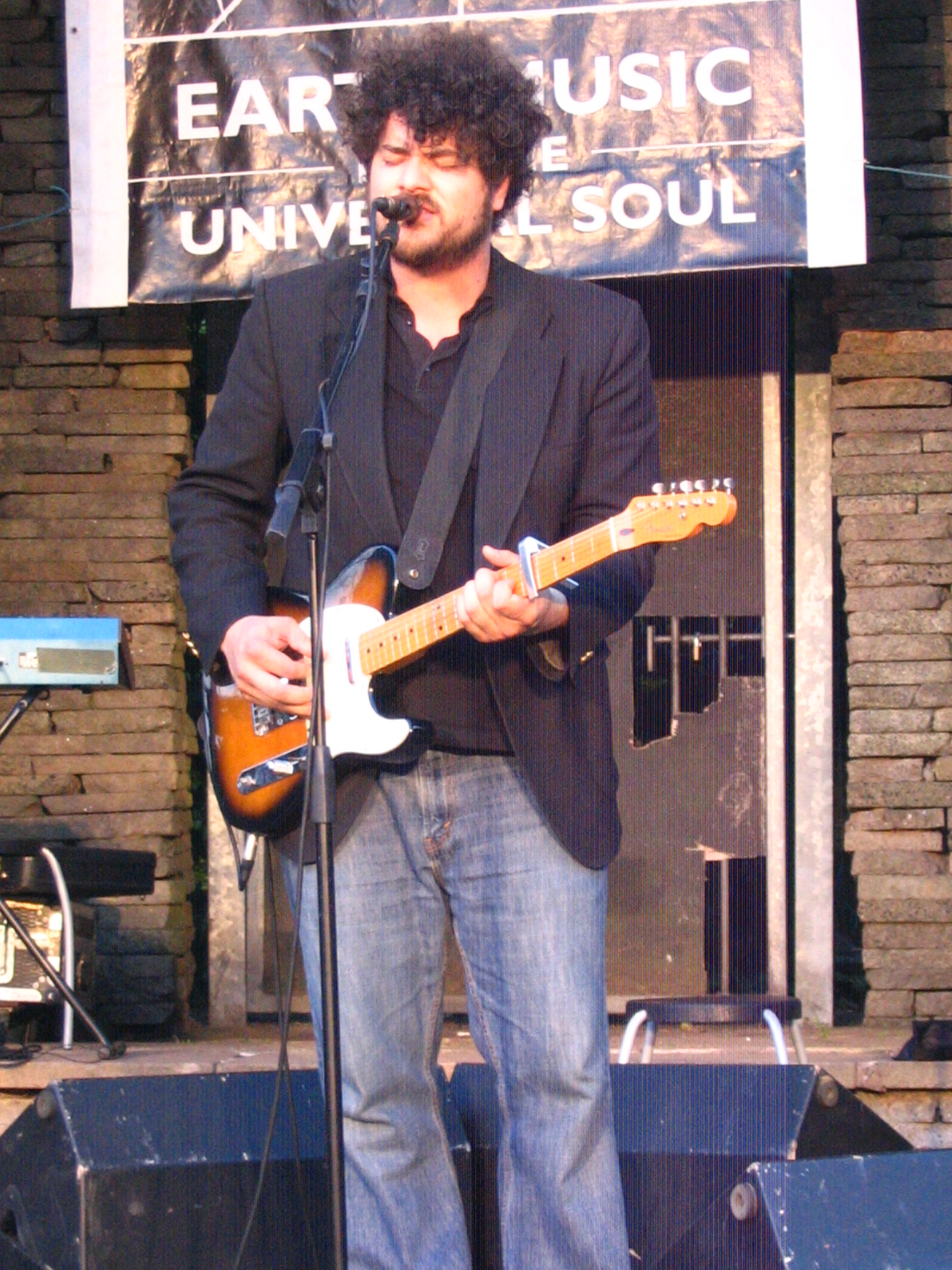
Richard Swift

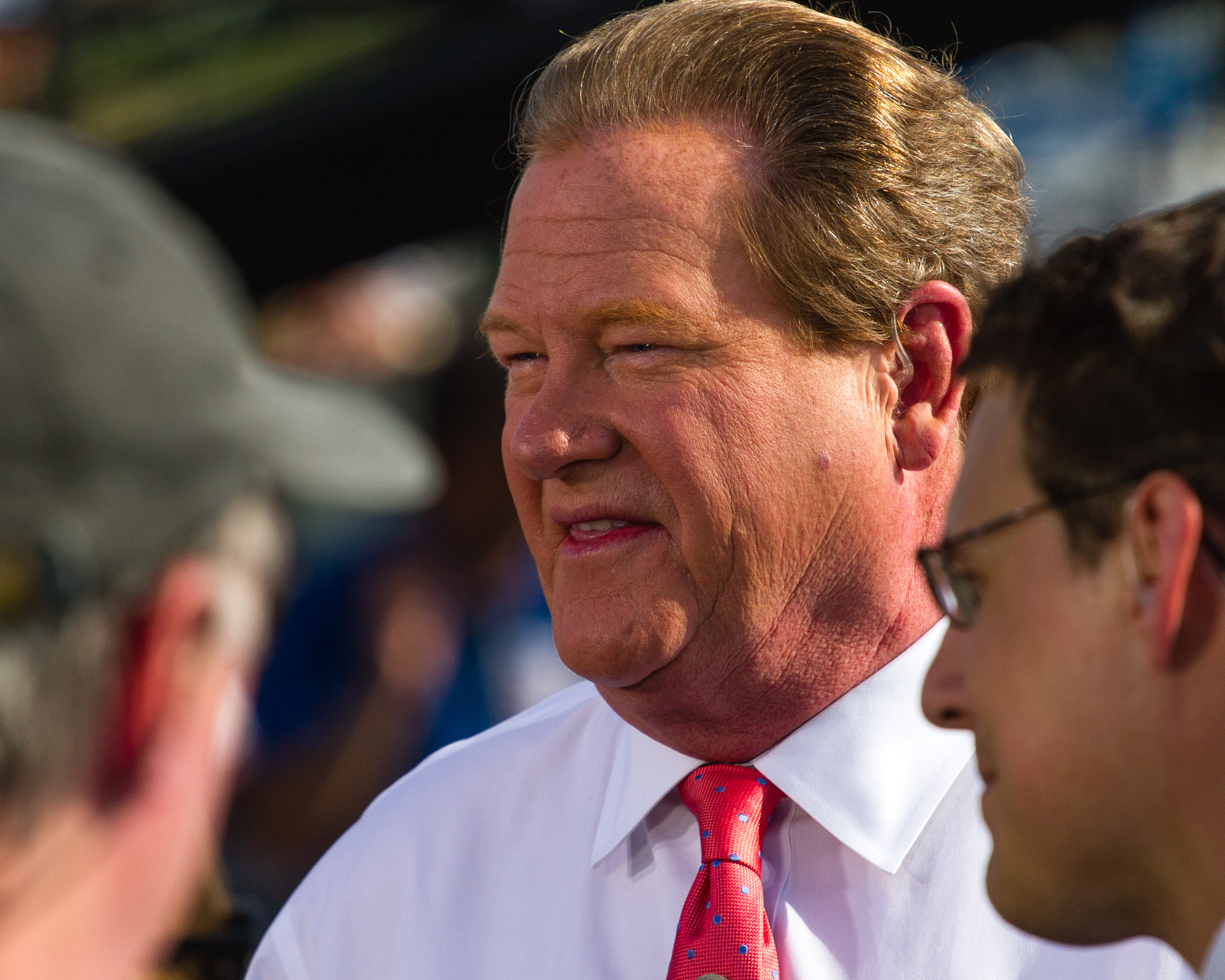
Ed Schultz

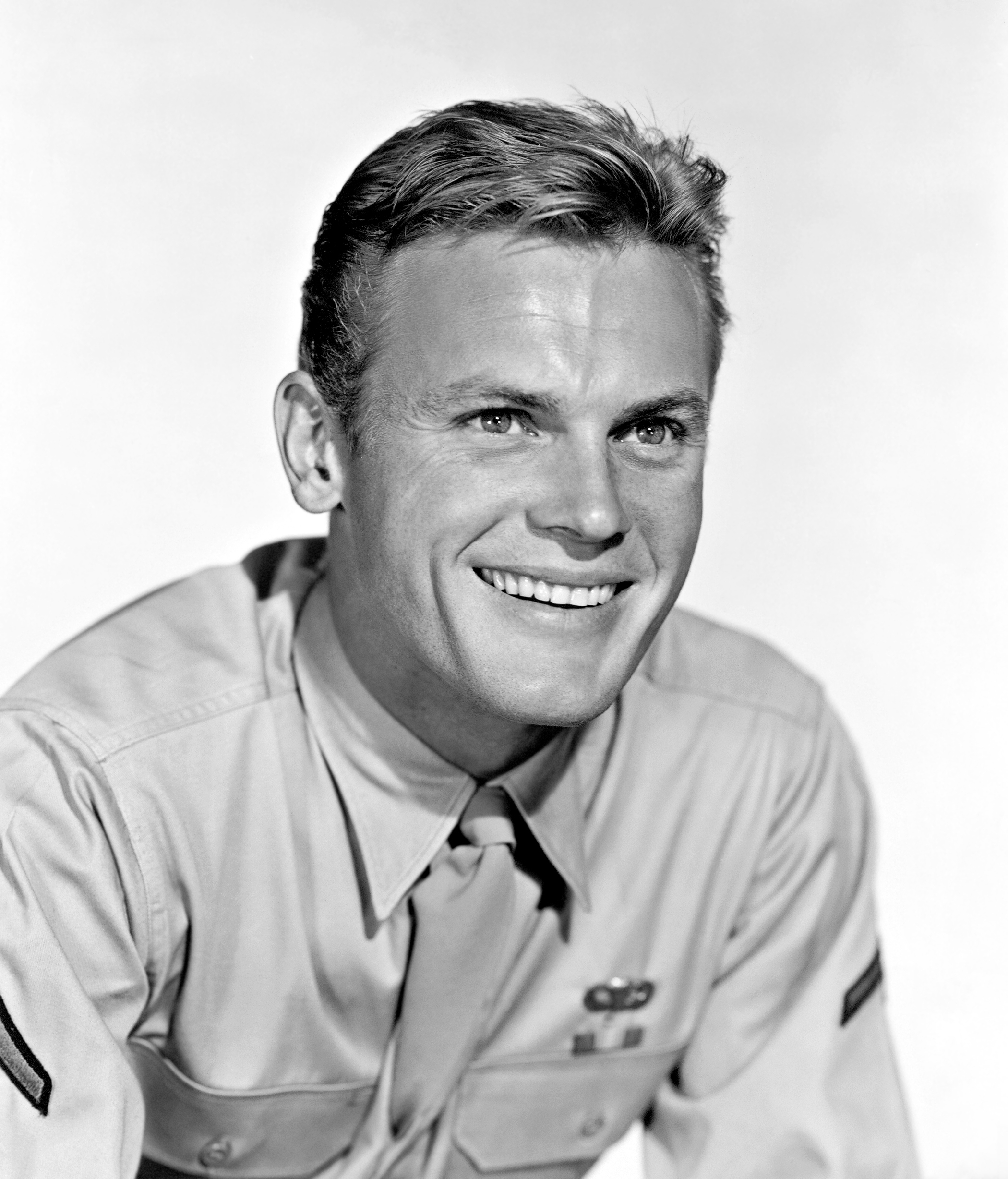
Tab Hunter

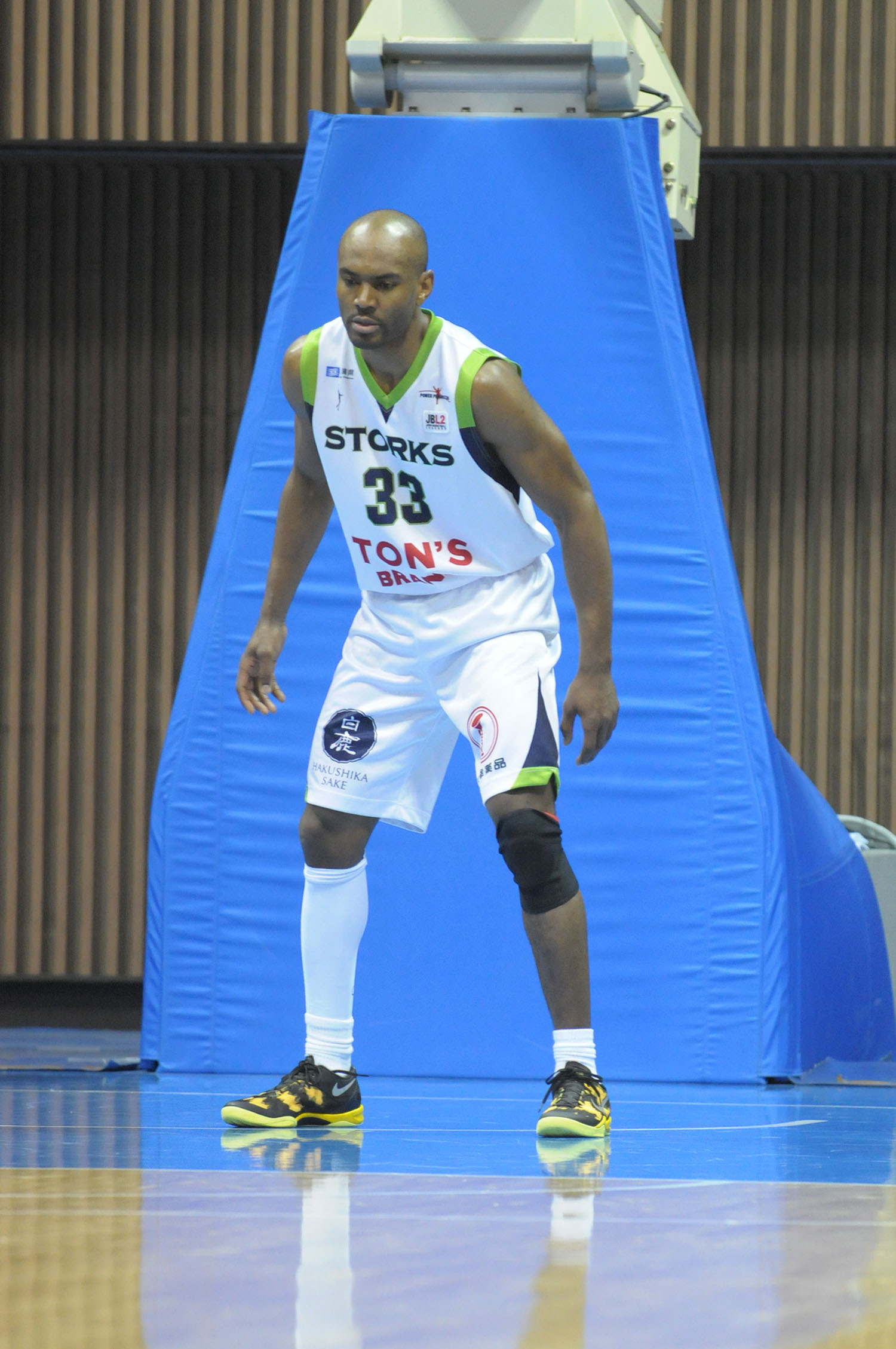
Billy Knight

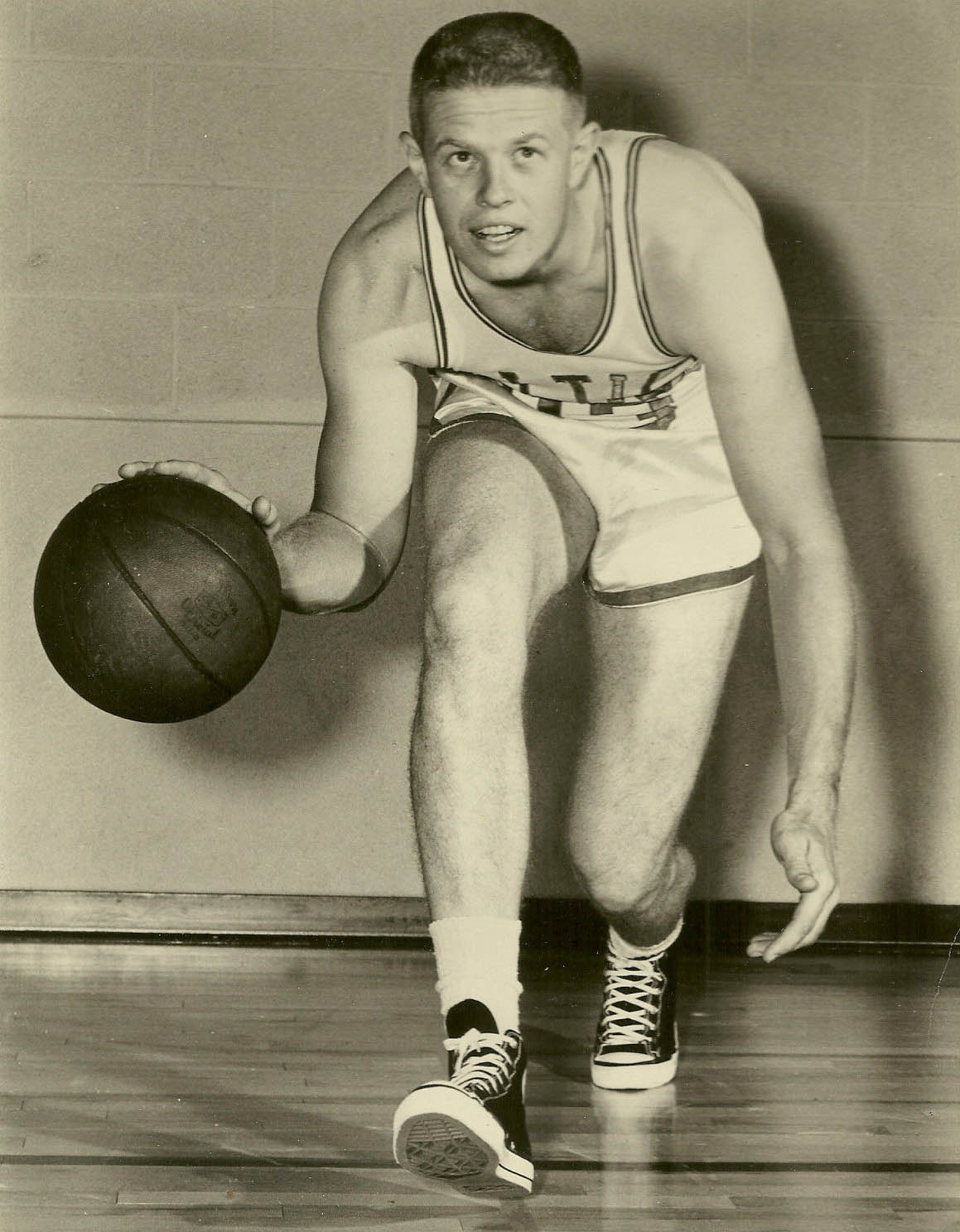
Frank Ramsey

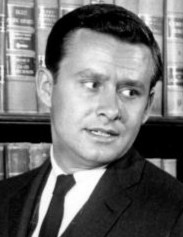
Roger Perry

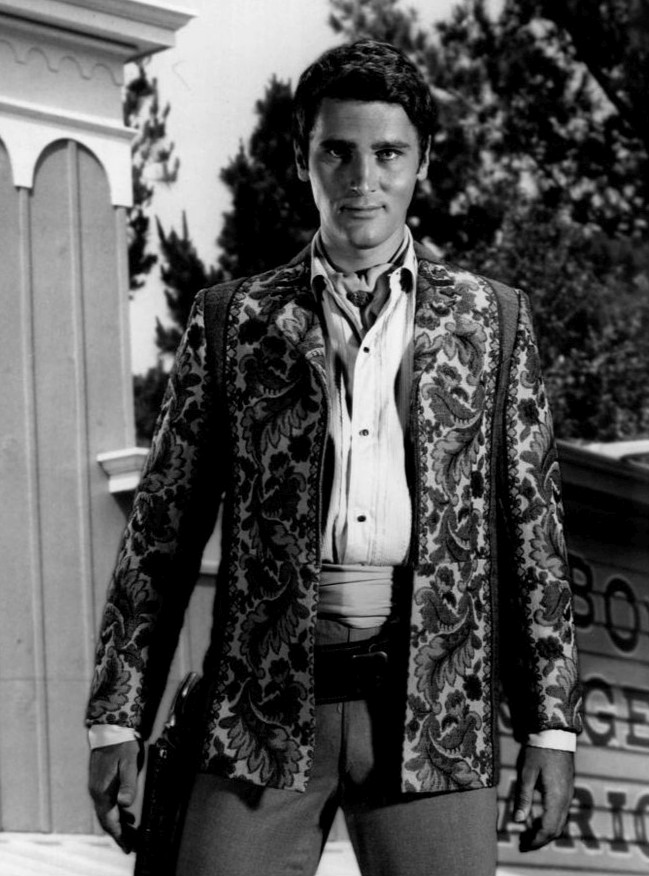
Robert Wolders

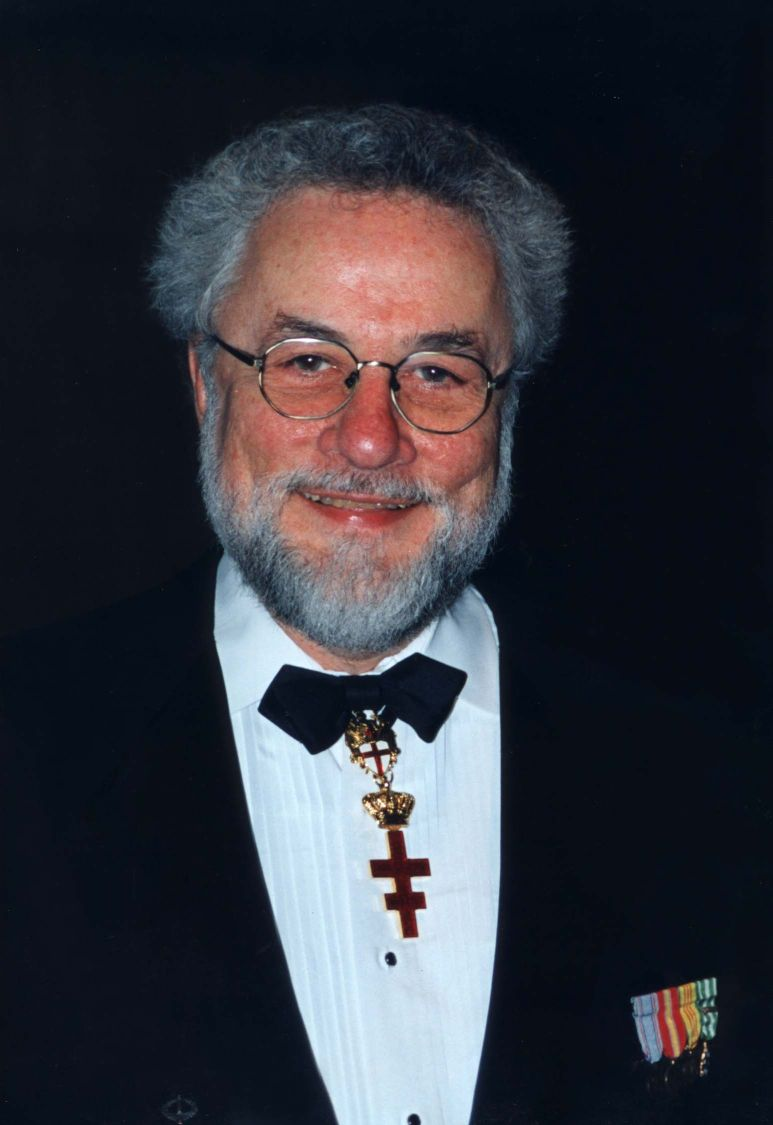
Adrian Cronauer

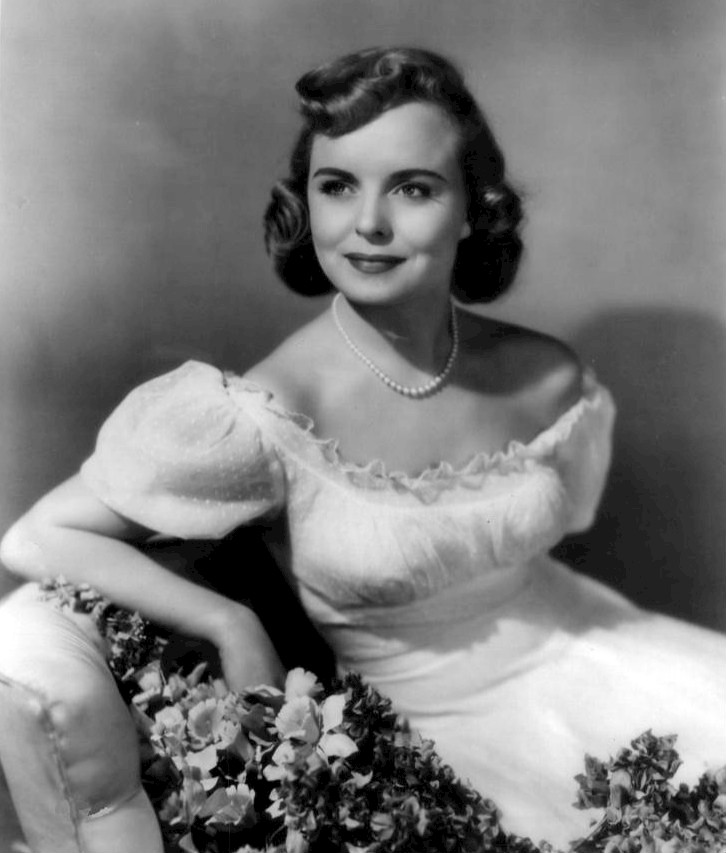
Meg Randall

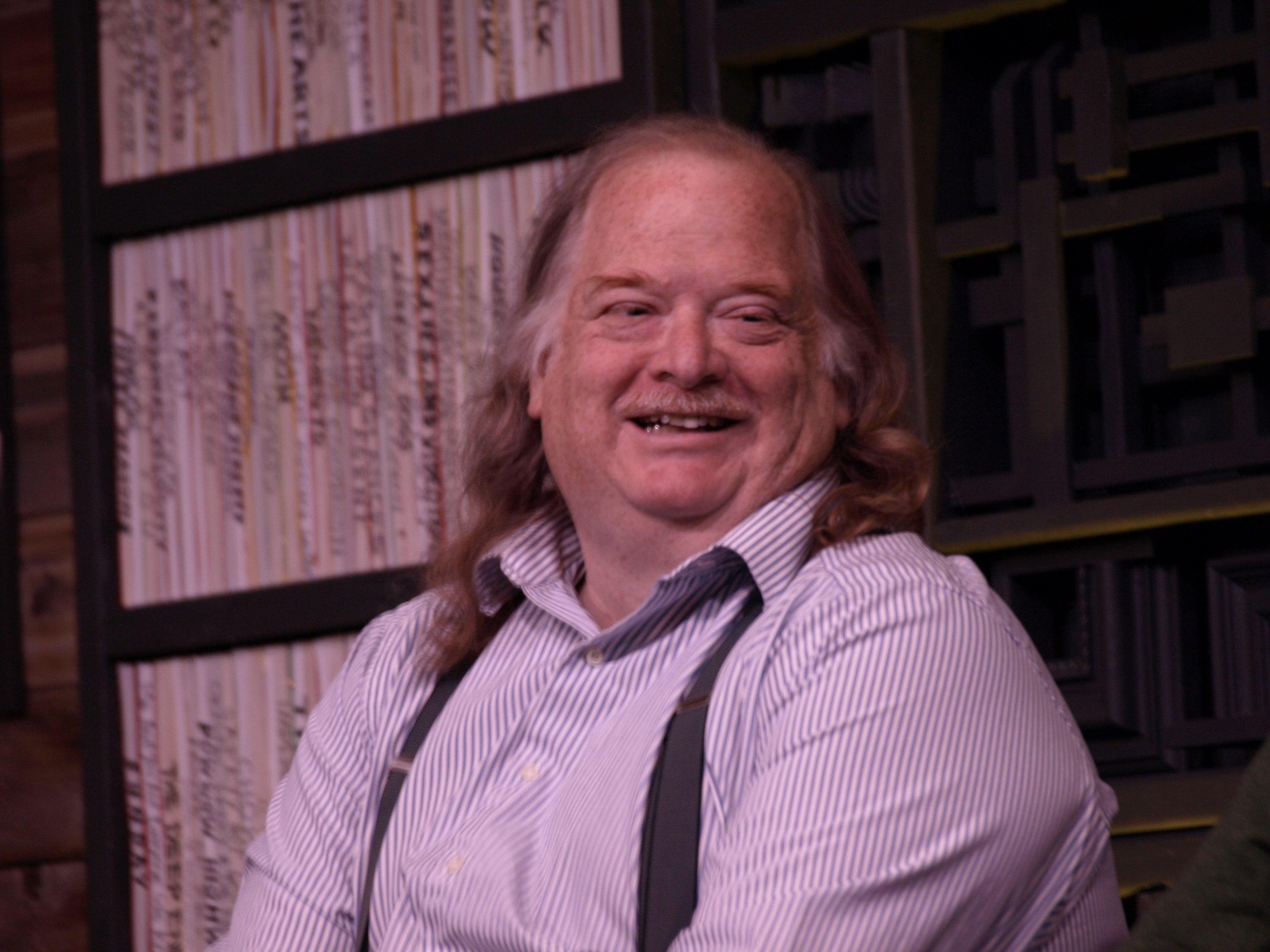
Jonathan Gold

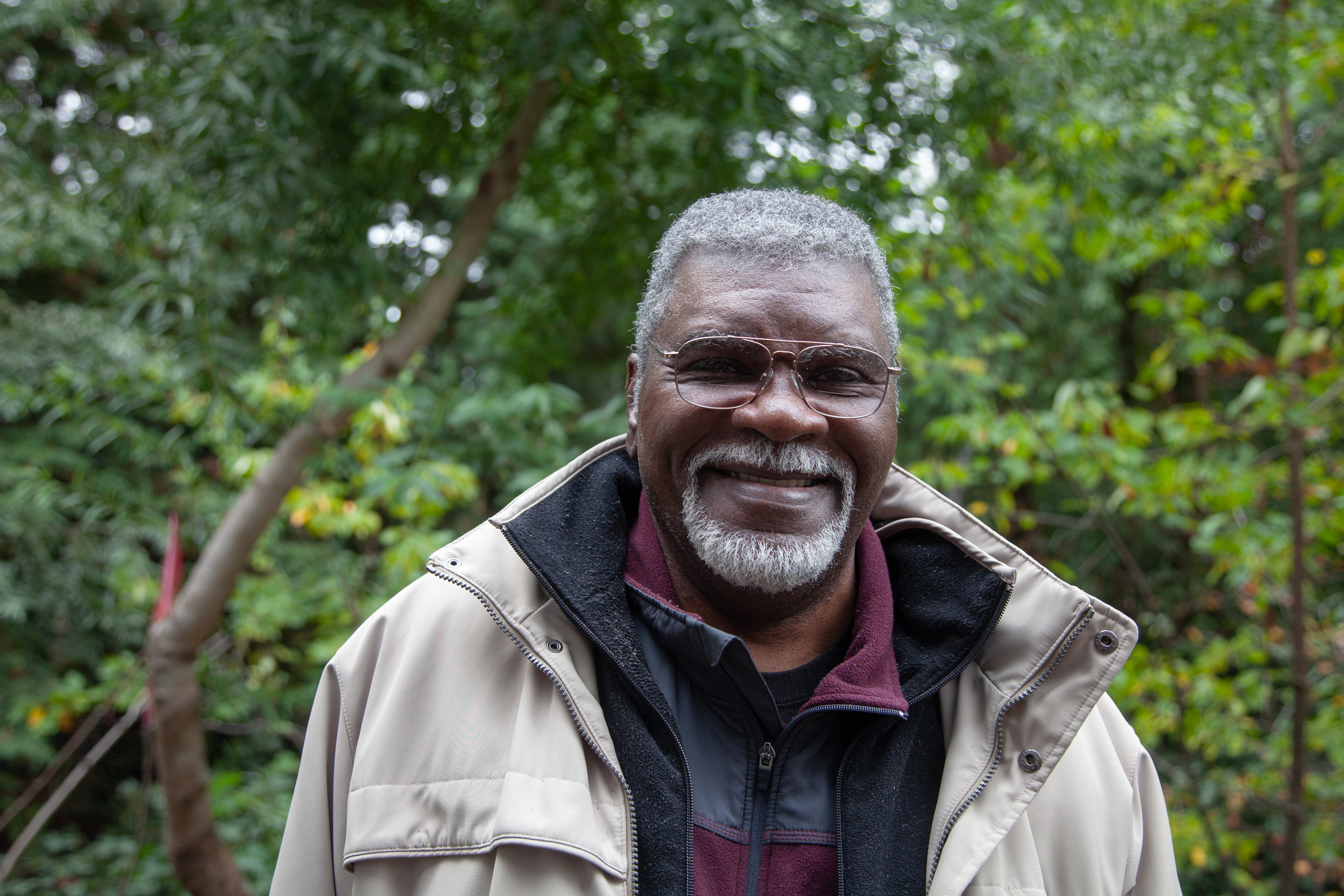
Elbert Howard

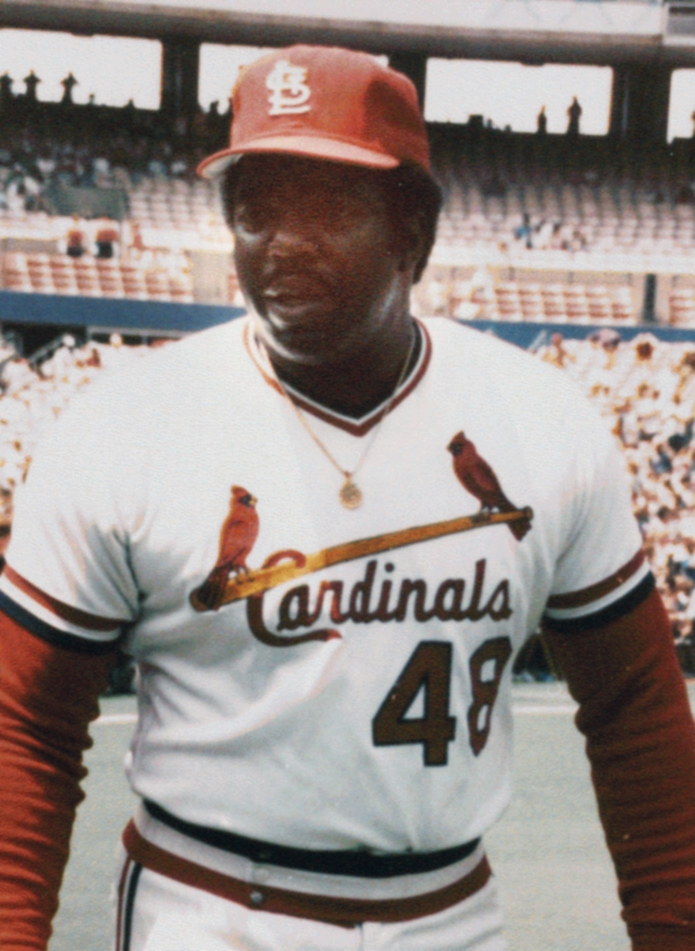
Johnny Lewis

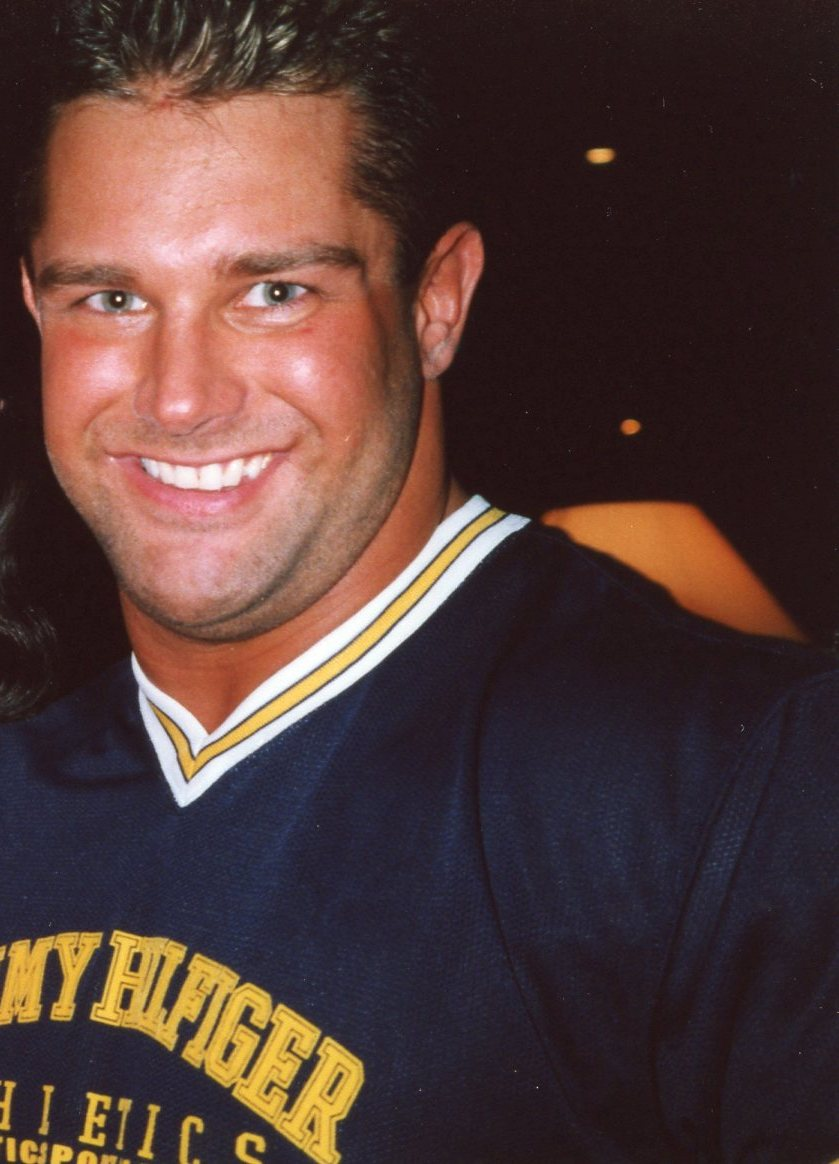
Brian Christopher

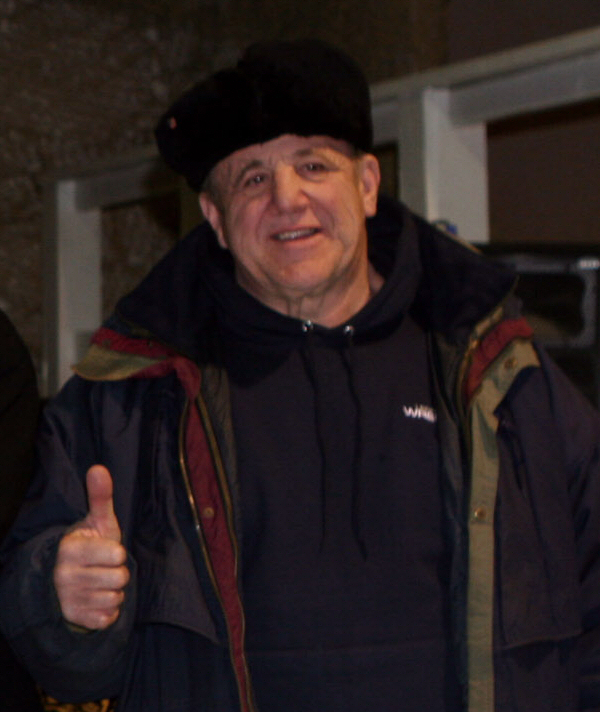
Nikolai Volkoff

- July 1
  - Bruce Baker, American geneticist (b. 1946)
  - Brad Dye, American politician (b. 1934)
  - Dick Feagler, American journalist (b. 1939)
  - Harvey Gentry, American baseball player (b. 1926)
  - Shirley Huffman, American politician (b. 1929)
- July 2 – Henry Butler, American jazz pianist and photographer (b. 1948)
- July 3 – Richard Swift, American singer, songwriter, multi-instrumentalist, producer, and film maker (b. 1977)
- July 4
  - E. Riley Anderson, American judge (b. 1933)
  - Alan S. Rabson, American pathologist and cancer researcher (b. 1926)
  - Donovan Webster, American journalist (b. 1959)
- July 5
  - Donald J. Farish, American educator (b. 1943)
  - Jim Malloy, American recording engineer (b. 1931)
  - Ed Schultz, American political commentator and television host (b. 1954)
- July 6
  - Donald D. Belcher, American executive (b. 1939)
  - Jeremy Gold, American actuary and economist (b. 1943)
  - J. Frederick Grassle, American marine biologist (b. 1940)
  - Bruce Hunter, American Olympic swimmer (b. 1939)
  - Ron Lollar, American politician (b. 1949)
  - Bruce Maher, American football player (b. 1938)
  - Vince Martin, American folk singer (b. 1937)
  - Clifford Rozier, American basketball player (b. 1973)
- July 7
  - Ralph T. Browning, American Air Force pilot (b. 1941)
  - Paul Fetler, American composer (b. 1920)
  - John R. Harris, American economist (b. 1934)
  - Bret Hoffmann, American death metal singer (b. 1967)
  - Tyler Honeycutt, American basketball player (b. 1990)
  - Alan Johnson, American choreographer (b. 1937)
  - Terry Todd, American weightlifter and sports historian (b. 1938)
- July 8
  - Tab Hunter, American actor and singer (b. 1931)
  - Billy Knight, American basketball player (b. 1979)
  - Frank Ramsey, American basketball player (b. 1931)
  - Lonnie Shelton, American basketball player (b. 1956)
- July 9
  - Barbara Carlson, American politician and radio host (b. 1938)
  - Sam Chisholm, New Zealand-born Australian television executive (b. 1940)
  - Sammy Esposito, American baseball player (b. 1932)
  - Melanie Kaye/Kantrowitz, American poet and activist (b. 1945)
  - Johnny Moates, American college basketball player (b. 1945)
  - Jenny Phillips, American documentarian (b. 1942)
- July 10
  - Robert Behringer, American physicist (b. 1949)
  - Ron Johnson, American football player (b. 1956)
  - Henry Morgenthau III, American author and television producer (b. 1917)
  - Marlene Riding in Mameah, American silversmith (b. 1933)
  - Darryl Rogers, American football coach (b. 1935)
  - John A. Stormer, American author (b. 1928)
- July 11
  - Richard John Garcia, American Roman Catholic prelate (b. 1947)
  - Barbara Harrell-Bond, American-born British refugee studies academic (b. 1932)
  - Rodolfo Lozano, American judge (b. 1942)
  - Nathaniel Reed, American environmentalist (b. 1934)
  - Lindy Remigino, American Olympic athlete (b. 1931)
- July 12
  - Roger Perry, American actor (b. 1933)
  - Del Shankel, American microbiologist and academic administrator (b. 1928)
  - Thomas Stephens, American football player (b. 1936)
  - Robert Wolders, Dutch actor (b. 1936)
- July 13
  - Ponty Bone, American accordionist (b. 1940)
  - Stan Dragoti, American film director (b. 1932)
  - Jocelyn Vollmar, American ballerina (b. 1926)
- July 14
  - Harold Covington, American political activist (b. 1954)
  - Claudia Griffith, American politician (b. 1951)
  - Chet Morgan, American politician (b. 1937)
  - Thomas Stevens, American trumpeter (b. 1939)
  - Natalia Tanner, American physician (b. 1922)
  - Ron Thomas, American basketball player (b. 1951)
- July 15
  - Dave Dave, American conceptual artist (b. 1976)
  - Theryl DeClouet, American jazz-funk singer (b. 1952)
- July 16
  - Robin Jones, American basketball player (b. 1954)
  - Gabriel Rivera, American football player (b. 1961)
- July 17
  - Arthur James Armstrong, American Methodist bishop (b. 1925)
  - Gary Beach, American actor (b. 1948)
  - Lincoln Brower, American entomologist and academic (b. 1932)
  - Mark Hayes, American golfer (b. 1949)
  - Nancy M. Petry, American psychologist (b. 1969)
  - Robert H. Traurig, American lawyer (b. 1925)
- July 18
  - Adrian Cronauer, American disc jockey (b. 1938)
  - Ronald H. Griffith, American military officer (b. 1936)
  - Aiko Herzig-Yoshinaga, American political activist (b. 1924)
  - Burton Richter, American Nobel physicist (b. 1931)
  - Mollie Tibbetts, American student (b. 1998)
- July 19
  - Jon Schnepp, American animator, filmmaker and voice actor (b. 1967)
  - Yale Udoff, American screenwriter (b. 1935)
  - John Vigilante, American ice hockey player (b. 1985)
- July 20 – Meg Randall, American actress (b. 1926)
- July 21 – Jonathan Gold, American food and music critic (b. 1960)
- July 22
  - Robert M. Blizzard, American endocrinologist (b. 1924)
  - Raymond Hunthausen, American Roman Catholic prelate (b. 1922)
  - Donald Kaul, American journalist (b. 1935)
  - Brian Kellow, American magazine editor (b. 1959)
  - Rene Portland, American college basketball coach (b. 1953)
  - Clemmie Spangler, American banker (b. 1932)
  - Tony Sparano, American football coach (b. 1962)
- July 23
  - Maryon Pittman Allen, American journalist and politician (b. 1926)
  - George Brown, American long jumper (b. 1932)
  - Tony Cline, American football player (b. 1949)
  - Howard Felsher, American game show producer (b. 1928)
  - Elbert Howard, American civil rights activist, co-founder of the Black Panther Party (b. 1938)
  - Stephen Juan, American anthropologist and author (b. 1949)
  - Mary Jane McCaffree, American secretary (b. 1912)
  - Jacob Tanzer, American attorney (b. 1935)
  - Elliot Vesell, American pharmacologist (b. 1934)
- July 24 – Jack P. Lewis, American Biblical scholar (b. 1919)
- July 26 – Robert Martin, American fighter pilot (b. 1919)
- July 27
  - Michael P. DeLong, American Marine Corps lieutenant general (b. 1945)
  - Leo E. Litwak, American writer (b. 1923)
  - Mateja Matejić, Yugoslavian-born American writer (b. 1924)
  - Nick Raynes, American film producer (b. 1985)
- July 28
  - John C. Buechner, American university administrator and politician (b. 1936)
  - Bruce Lietzke, American professional golfer (b. 1951)
- July 29
  - Brickhouse Brown, American professional wrestler (b. 1961)
  - Brian Christopher, American professional wrestler (b. 1972)
  - Yaakov Elman, American Judaic scholar (b. 1944)
  - Johnny Lewis, American baseball player and coach (b. 1940)
  - Sam Mehran, American musician (b. 1987)
  - Nikolai Volkoff, Yugoslav-born American professional wrestler (b. 1947)
  - Bryan Wagner, American politician (b. 1943)
- July 30
  - Ron Dellums, American politician (b. 1936)
  - Michael A. Sheehan, American author and government official (b. 1955)
  - Robert Thunell, American biogeochemist and oceanographer (b. 1951)
- July 31
  - George Cowgill, American anthropologist and archaeologist (b. 1929)
  - Michael Krop, American school board member (b. 1930)
  - Daryl Robertson, American baseball player (b. 1936)
  - Betty Schoenbaum, American philanthropist (b. 1917)
  - Julia Weertman, American materials scientist (b. 1926)
  - Beatrice Wright, American psychologist (b. 1918)

=== August ===
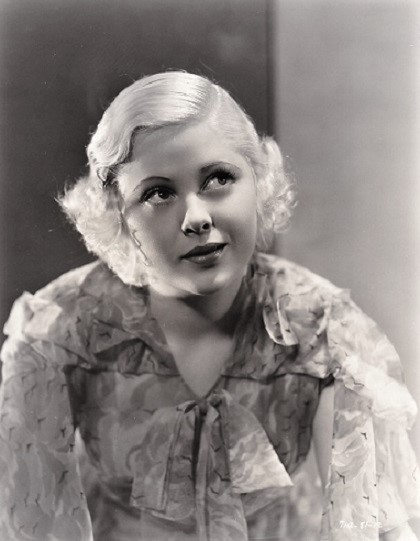
Mary Carlisle

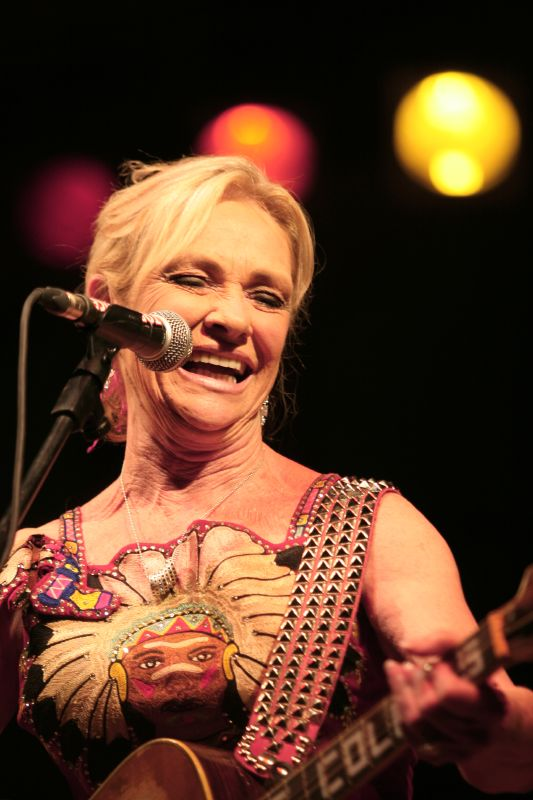
Lorrie Collins

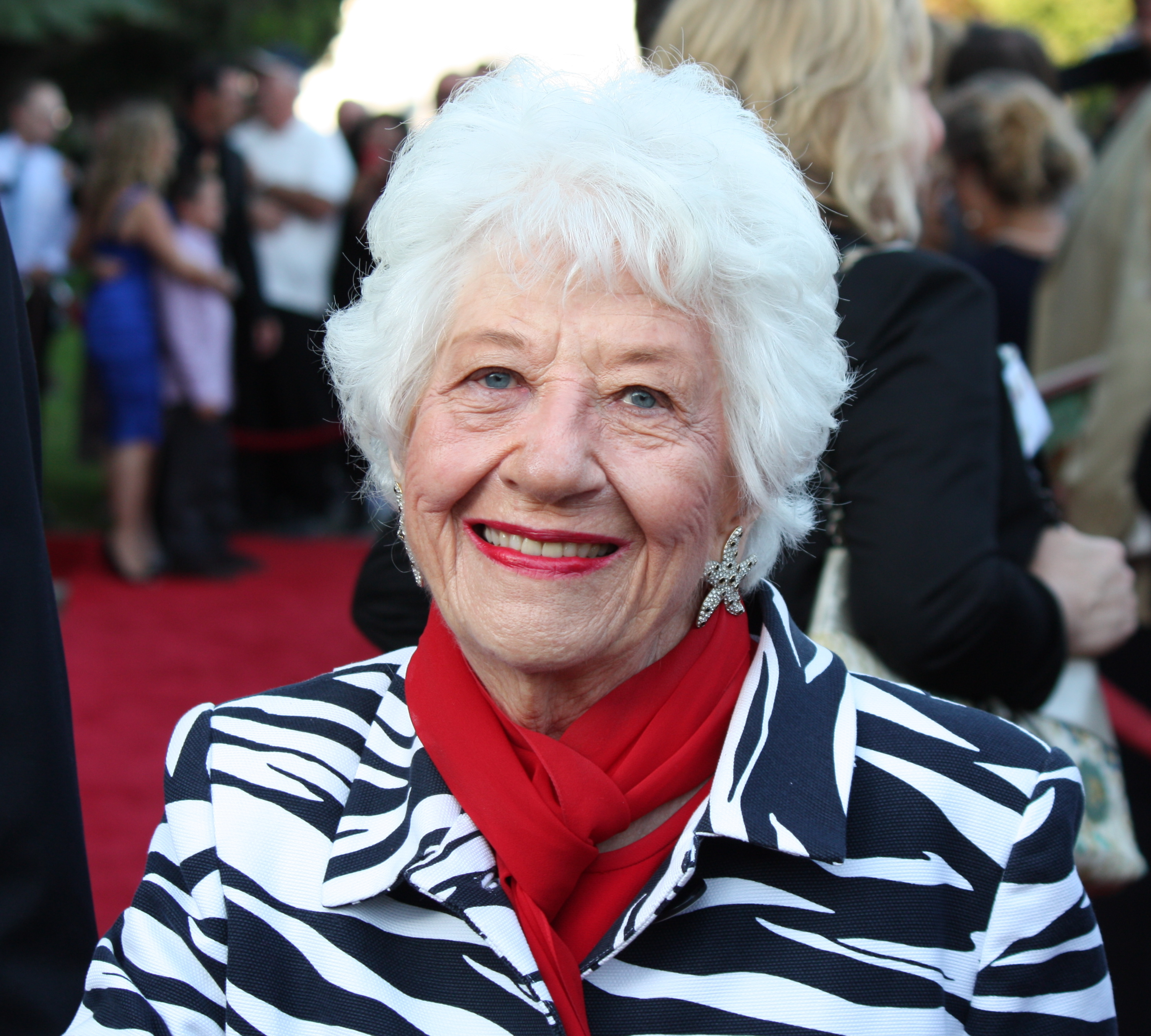
Charlotte Rae

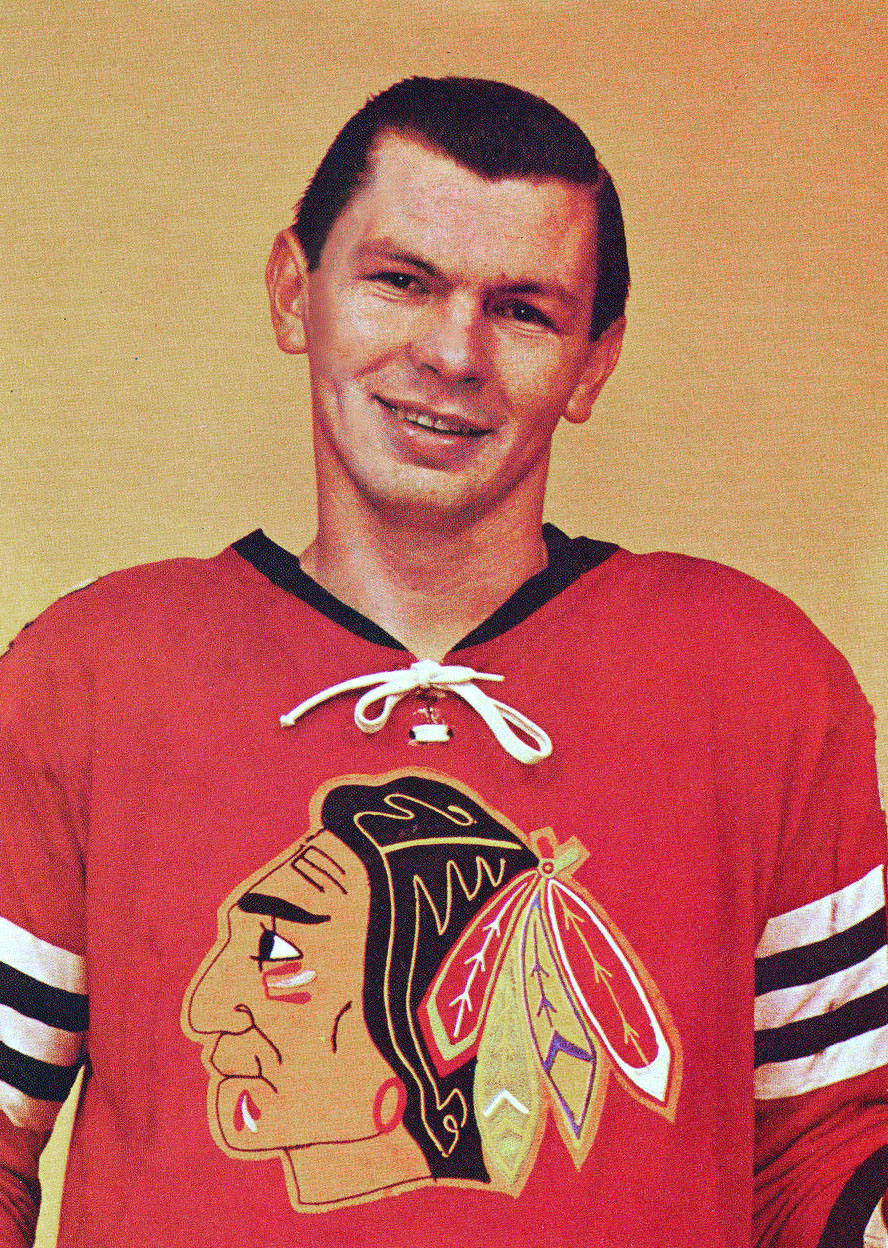
Stan Mikita

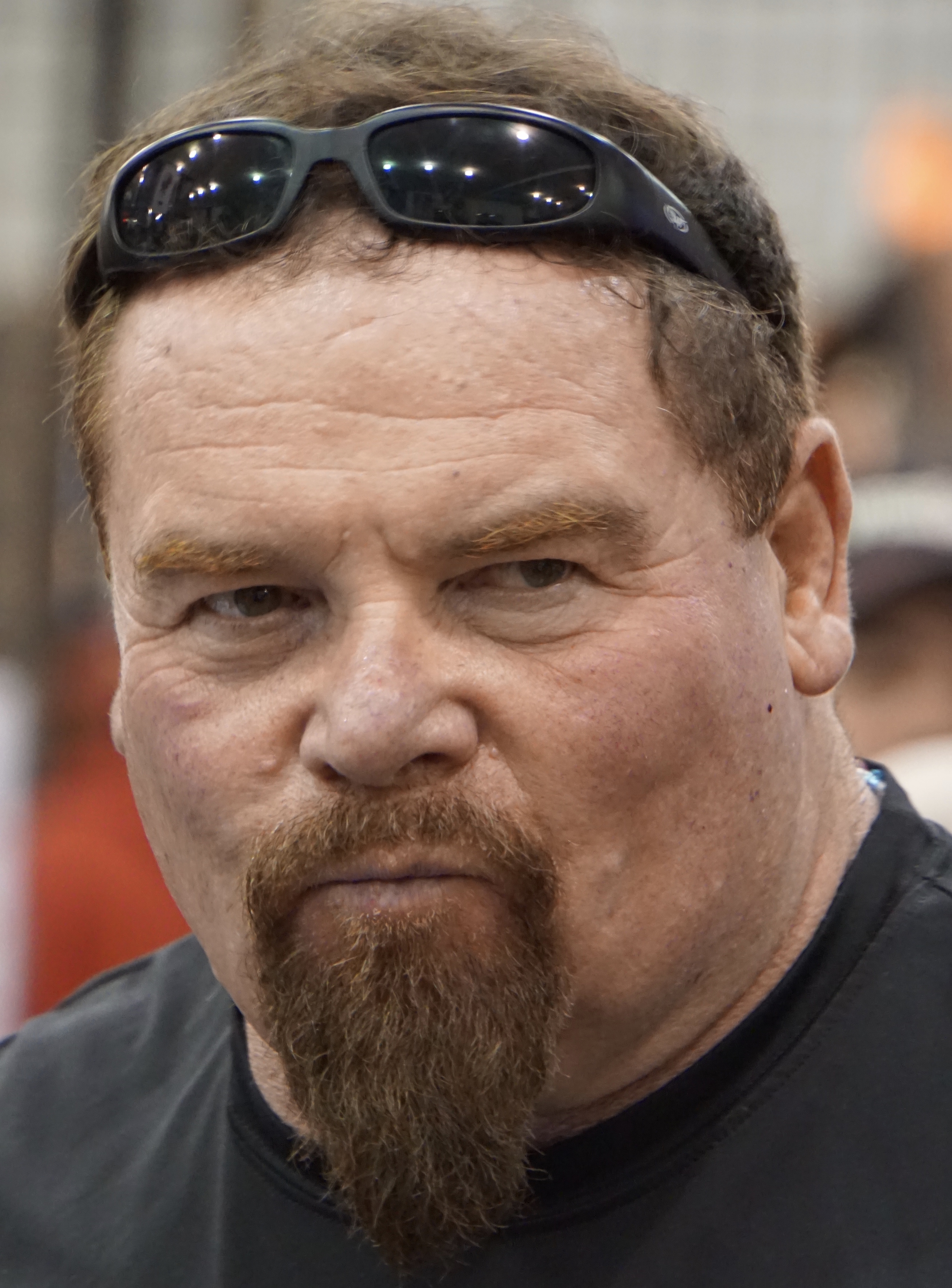
Jim Neidhart

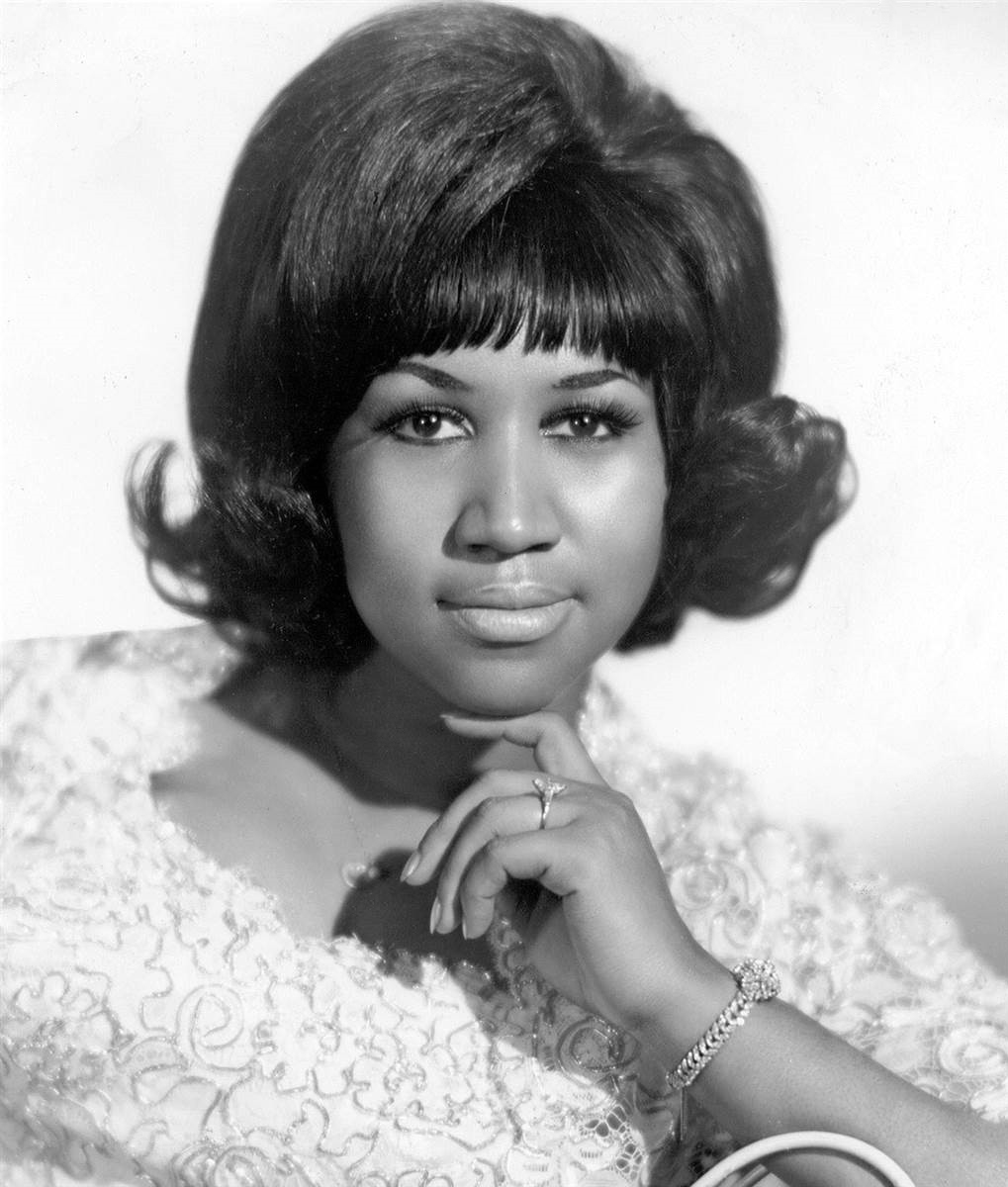
Aretha Franklin

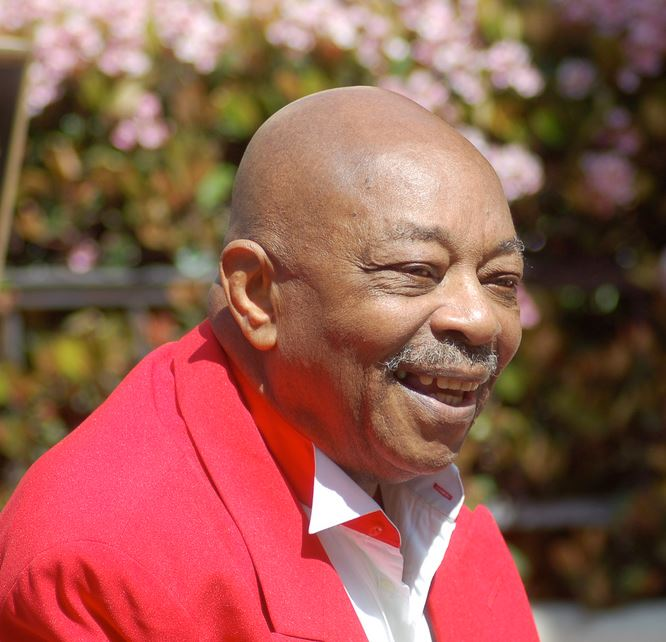
Eddie Willis

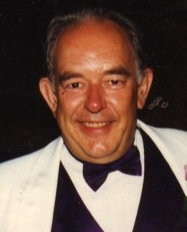
Robin Leach

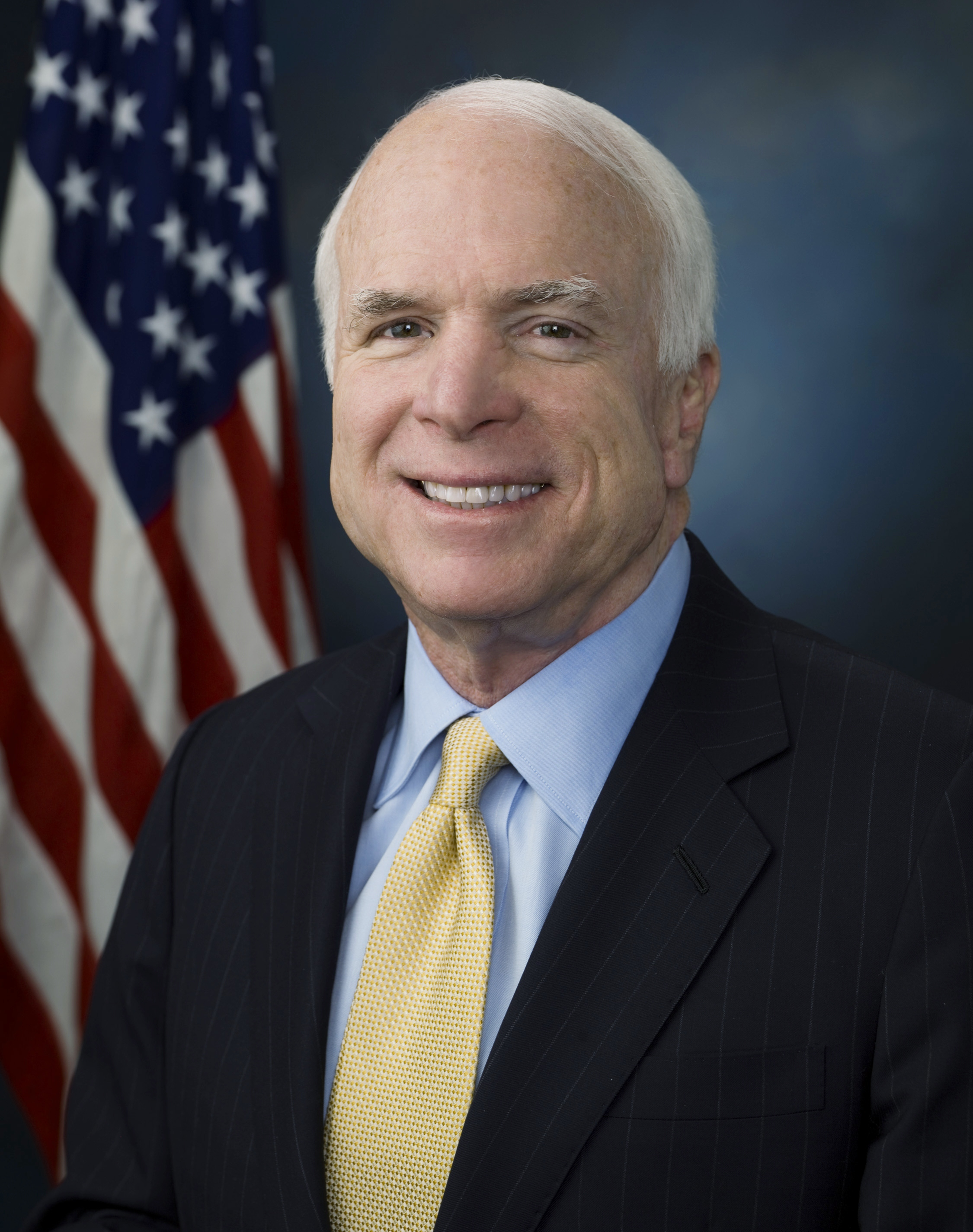
John McCain

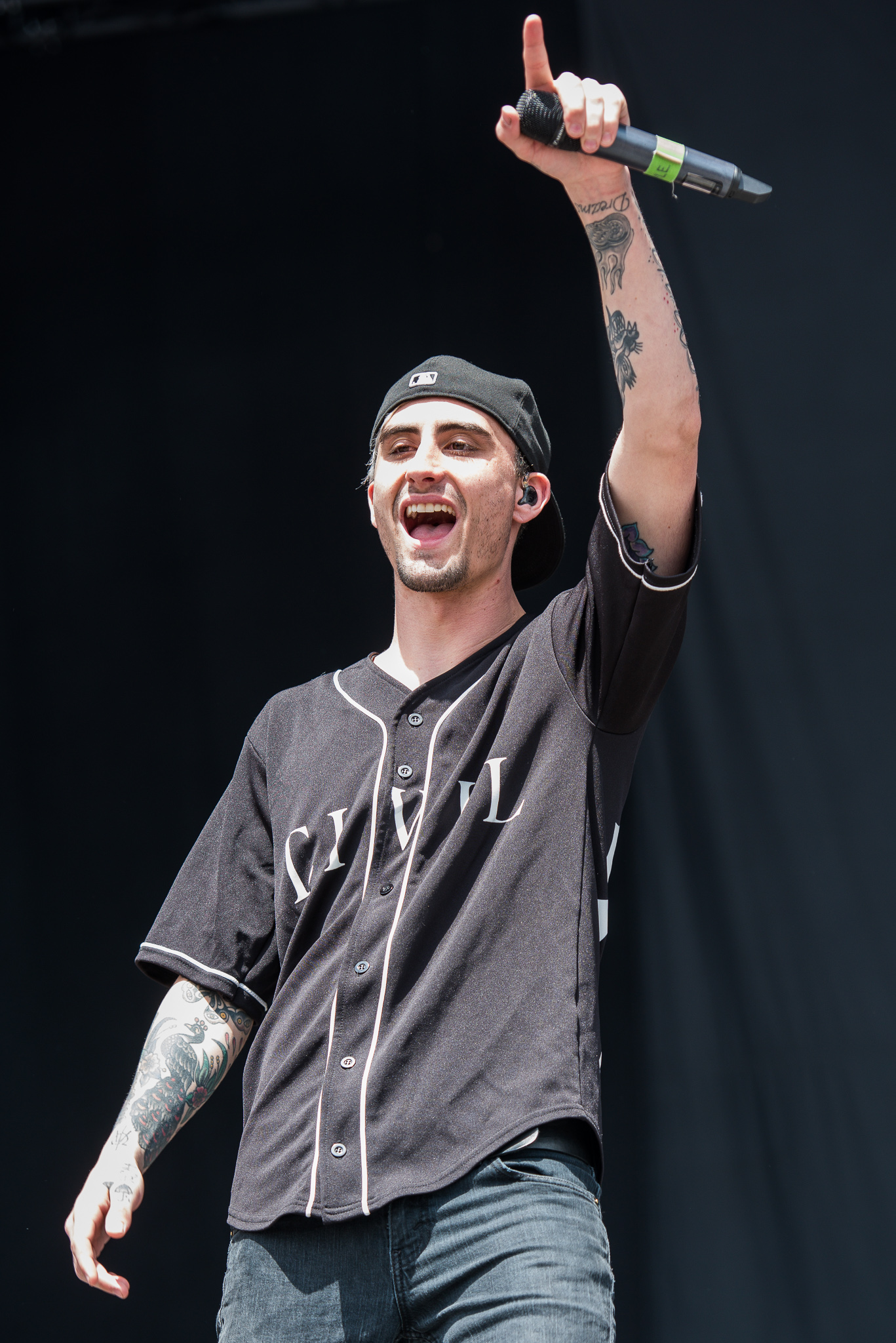
Kyle Pavone

Neil Simon

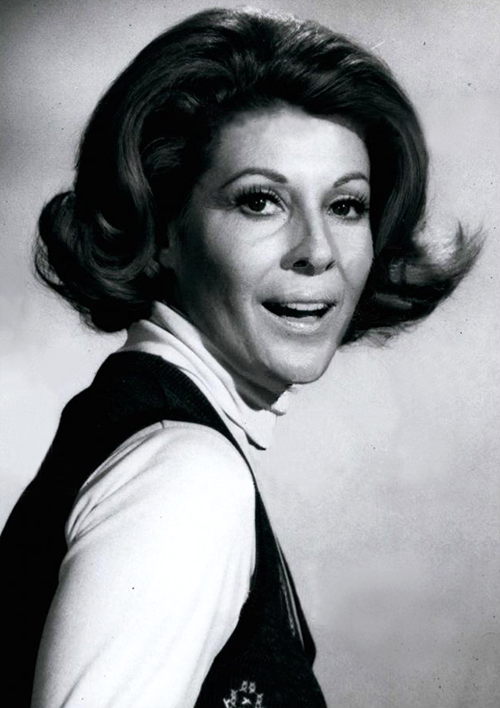
Susan Brown

- August 1
  - Mary Carlisle, American actress (b. 1914)
  - David I. Cleland, American engineer and writer (b. 1926)
  - Fakir Musafar, American performance artist (b. 1930)
  - Nancy Tuckerman, American secretary (b. 1929)
  - Rolf Valtin, American soccer player (b. 1925)
  - Taylor Whitley, American football player (b. 1979)
- August 2
  - Neil Argo, American composer (b. 1947)
  - Bill Wattenburg, American engineer, author, and radio talk show host (b. 1936)
- August 3 – Joseph C. Burke, American educator and academic (b. 1932)
- August 4 – Lorrie Collins, American country singer (b. 1942)
- August 5 – Charlotte Rae, American actress (b. 1926)
- August 6
  - Patricia Benoit, television actress and film director, (b. 1927)
  - Margaret Heckler, American politician and diplomat (b. 1931)
  - Paul Laxalt, American politician (b. 1922)
  - Leonard Lewinsohn, American Islamic scholar (b. 1953)
  - Robert A. Plane, American chemist, vintner and academic administrator (b. 1928)
  - William E. Schluter, American politician (b. 1928)
  - Anya Krugovoy Silver, American poet (b. 1969)
- August 7
  - Andrew Coburn, American author (b. 1932)
  - Arvonne Fraser, American women's rights activist (b. 1926)
  - Richard H. Kline, American cinematographer (b. 1927)
  - Stan Mikita, Slovak-born Canadian ice hockey player (b. 1940)
  - Joel H. Silbey, American historian (b. 1934)
  - Gerald Weinberg, American computer scientist (b. 1934)
  - Robley Wilson, American writer (b. 1930)
- August 8
  - Katie Cannon, American theologian (b. 1950)
  - Wendell Erickson, American politician (b. 1925)
  - Robert Hugh Ferrell, American historian and author (b. 1921)
  - John Glines, American theatre producer (b. 1933)
  - Richard Sipe, American sociologist (b. 1932)
- August 9
  - Donald F. Holcomb, American physicist (b. 1926)
  - Billy Ray Irick, American convicted murderer (b. 1959)
  - John Kennedy, American baseball player (b. 1941)
  - Carol Springer, American politician (b. 1937)
- August 10
  - Peter Berck, American economist (b. 1950)
  - William Corbett, American poet (b. 1943)
  - Dawn Mabalon, American academic (b. 1973)
  - Katherine Nelson, American psychologist (b. 1930)
  - A. R. Schwartz, American politician (b. 1926)
- August 11
  - Terry A. Davis, American computer programmer (b. 1969)
  - Morris G. Hallock, American politician (b. 1926)
  - Stanley Keleman, American writer and chiropractor (b. 1932)
  - Manch Wheeler, American football player (b. 1939)
- August 12
  - Richard Lloyd Anderson, American historian (b. 1926)
  - Thomas J. Moran, American executive and humanitarian (b. 1953)
  - Steven T. Ross, American military historian (b. 1937)
- August 13
  - Mark Baker, 71, American actor (b. 1947)
  - John Carter, American film editor (b. 1922)
  - Don Garrison, American politician (b. 1925)
  - Powell A. Moore, American government official (b. 1938)
  - Jim Neidhart, American professional wrestler (b. 1955)
- August 14
  - Charles Victor Grahmann, American Roman Catholic prelate (b. 1931)
  - Mela Hudson, American actress (b. 1987)
  - Jill Janus, American rock singer (Huntress) (b. 1976)
- August 15
  - Kenneth Bowles, American computer scientist (b. 1929)
  - Robert Everett, American computer scientist (b. 1921)
  - Sterling Stuckey, American historian (b. 1932)
- August 16
  - Glen Chin, Chinese-American actor (b. 1948)
  - Aretha Franklin, R&B singer and songwriter (b. 1942)
- August 17
  - Bob Bass, American basketball coach and executive (b. 1929)
  - Leonard Boswell, American politician (b. 1934)
  - Linton Freeman, American sociologist (b. 1927)
  - Bunky Henry, American golfer (b. 1944)
  - David McReynolds, American pacifist and magazine editor (b. 1930)
  - Paul Naumoff, American football player (b. 1945)
  - Danny Pearson, American R&B singer (b. 1953)
  - Kurt Walker, American ice hockey player (b. 1954)
- August 18
  - Tom Clark, American poet and biographer (b. 1941)
  - Jack Costanzo, American percussionist (b. 1920)
  - Costas Kondylis, American architect (b. 1940)
  - John E. McCarthy, American Roman Catholic prelate (b. 1930)
  - Robert Todd, American filmmaker (b. 1963)
- August 19
  - Vaughn Beals, American businessman (b. 1928)
  - Louis Gambaccini, American civil servant, commissioner, founding chairman of NJ Transit (b. 1931)
  - Darrow Hooper, American shot-putter (b. 1932)
  - Joe Landrum, American baseball player (b. 1929)
  - Rod Saddler, American football player (b. 1966)
- August 20
  - Brian Murray, South African actor and director (b. 1937)
  - Eddie Willis, American musician (b. 1936)
- August 21
  - Barbara Harris, American actress (b. 1935)
  - James Whittico Jr., American physician (b. 1915)
- August 22 – Ed King, American musician (b. 1949)
- August 24 – Robin Leach, English television personality (b. 1941)
- August 25
  - John McCain, U.S. Senator from Arizona, Republican presidential nominee (2008) (b. 1936)
  - Kyle Pavone, American metalcore singer, co-frontman for We Came as Romans (b. 1990)
- August 26 – Neil Simon, American playwright (b. 1927)
- August 27
  - Dale M. Cochran, American politician (b. 1929)
  - Henry McNamara, American politician (b. 1935)
  - Bobby Walden, American football player (b. 1938)
  - Fredd Wayne, American actor (b. 1925)
- August 29
  - Samuel Conti, American judge (b. 1922)
  - Gary Friedrich, American comic book writer (b. 1943)
  - Joseph P. Graw, American politician (b. 1915)
  - Marie Severin, American comics artist and colorist (b. 1929)
  - Paul Spudis, American geologist and planetary scientist (b. 1952)
  - David Sugarbaker, American physician (b. 1953)
  - Paul Taylor, American choreographer (b. 1930)
- August 30
  - Peter Frame, American ballet dancer (b. 1957)
  - Ray Kubala, American football player (b. 1943)
  - Vanessa Marquez, American actress (b. 1968)
- August 31
  - Susan Brown, American actress (b. 1932)
  - Gloria Jean, American actress and singer (b. 1926)
  - Carole Shelley, English actress (b. 1939)

=== September ===
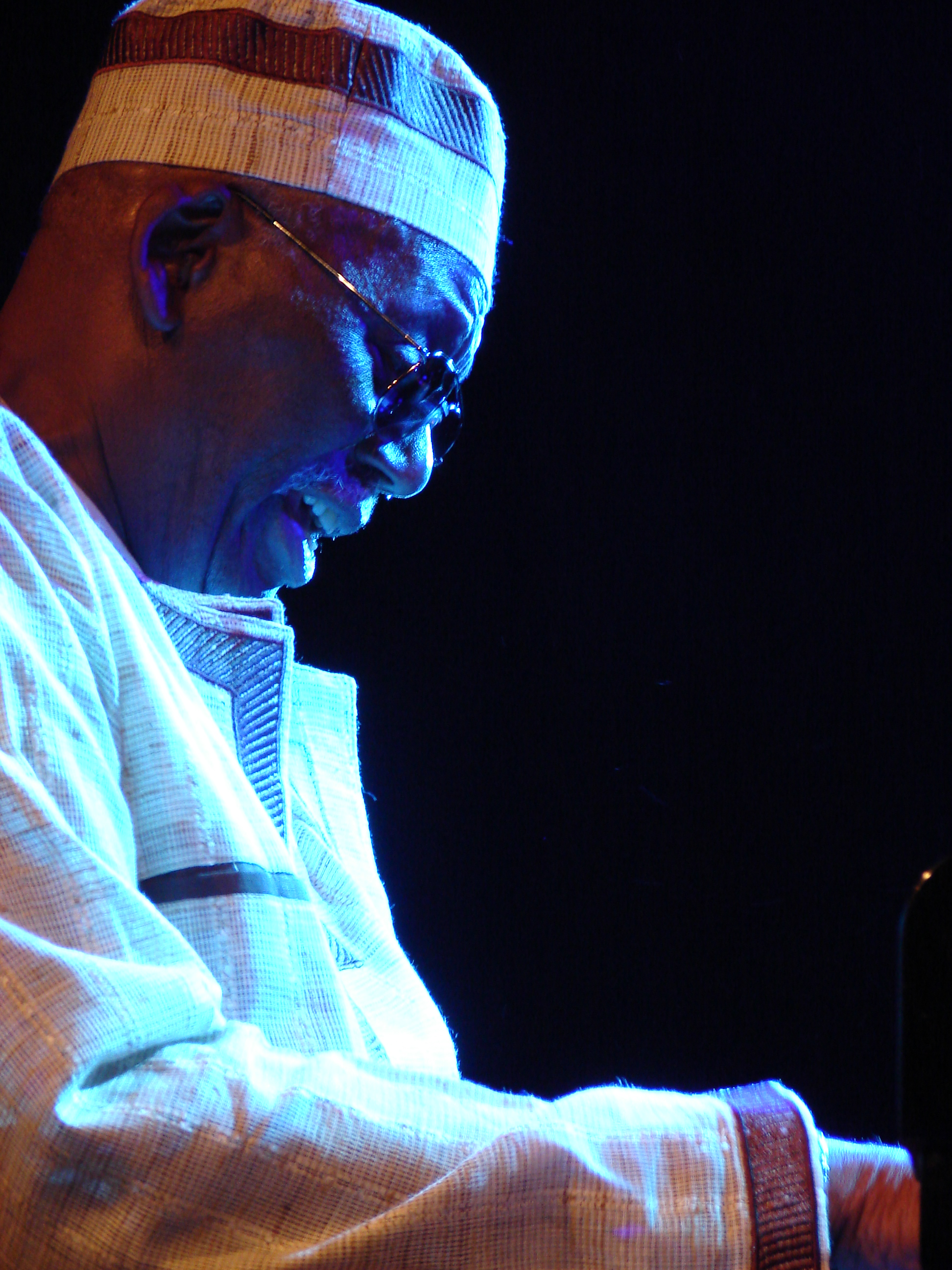
Randy Weston

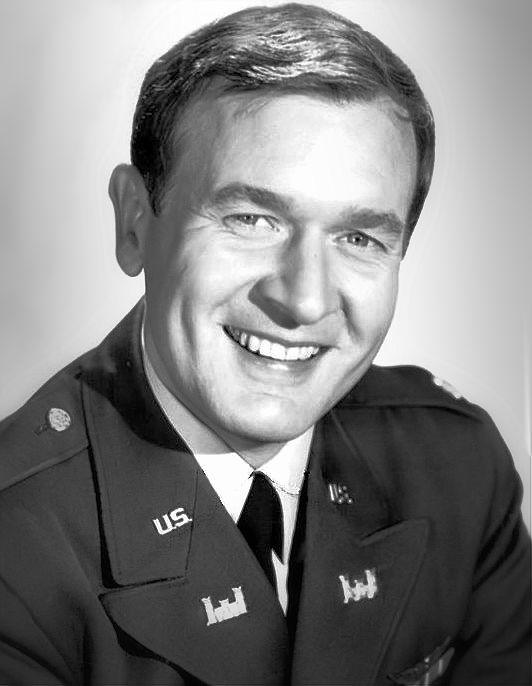
Bill Daily

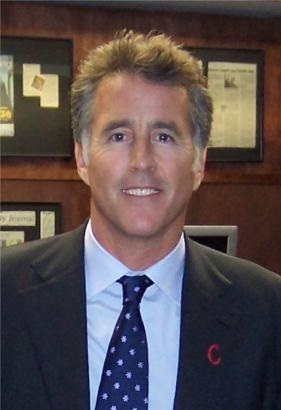
Christopher Lawford

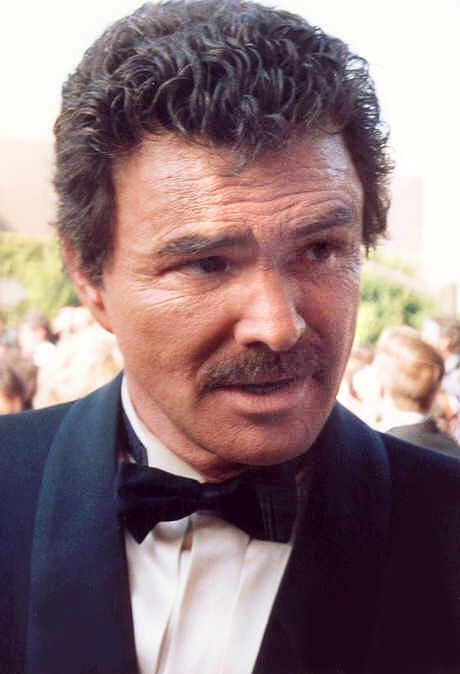
Burt Reynolds

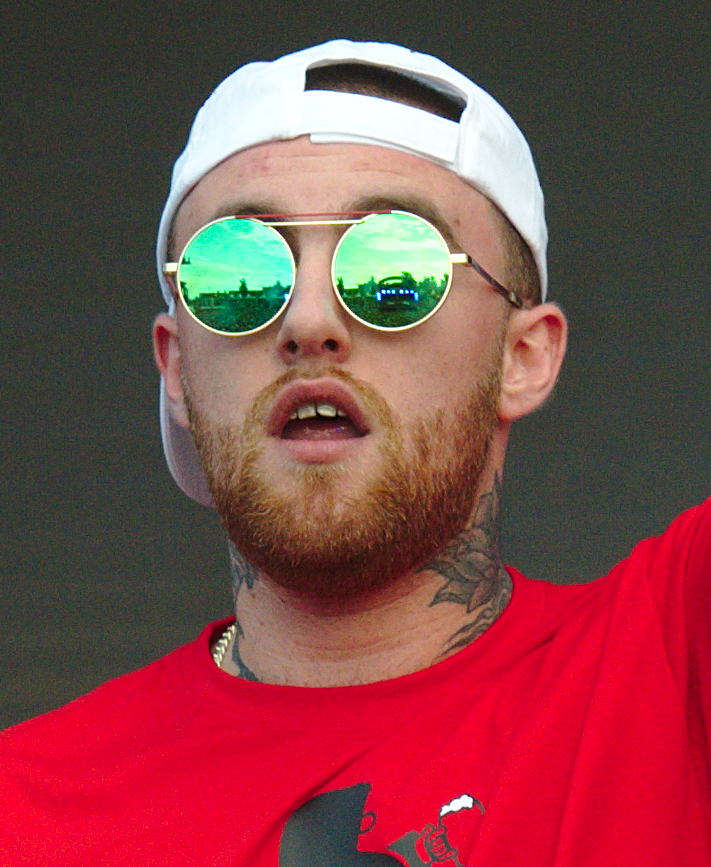
Mac Miller

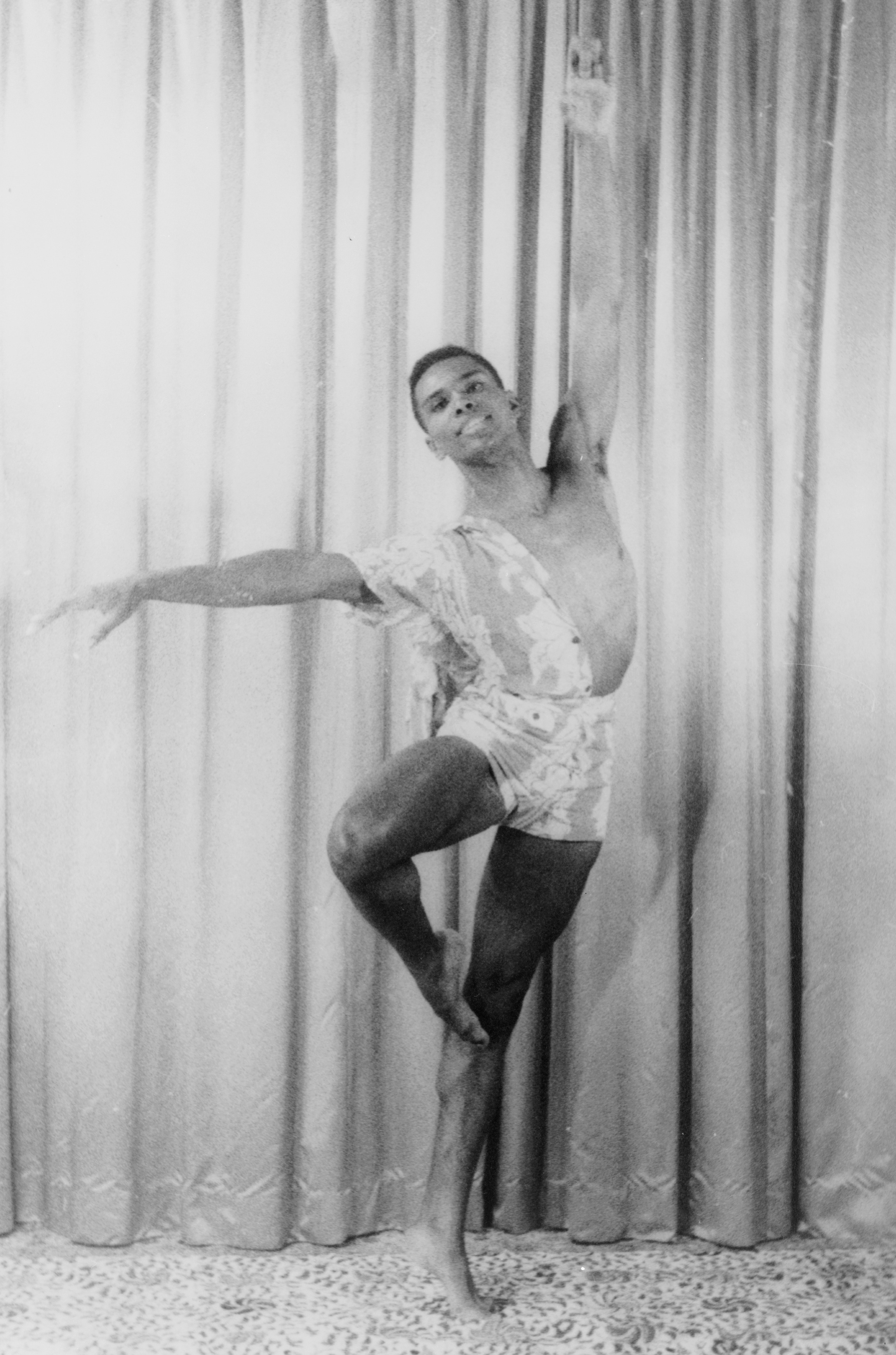
Arthur Mitchell

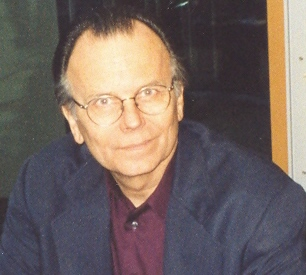
Gary Kurtz

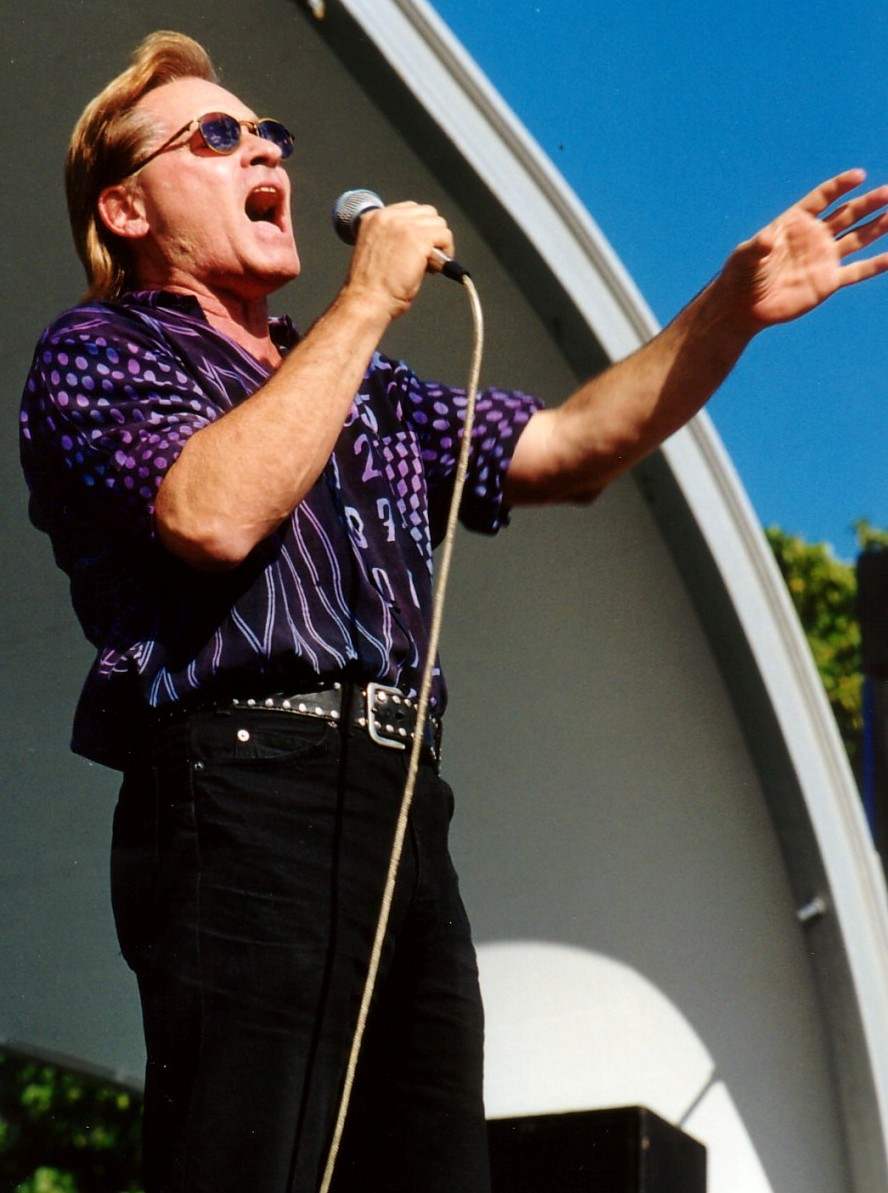
Marty Balin

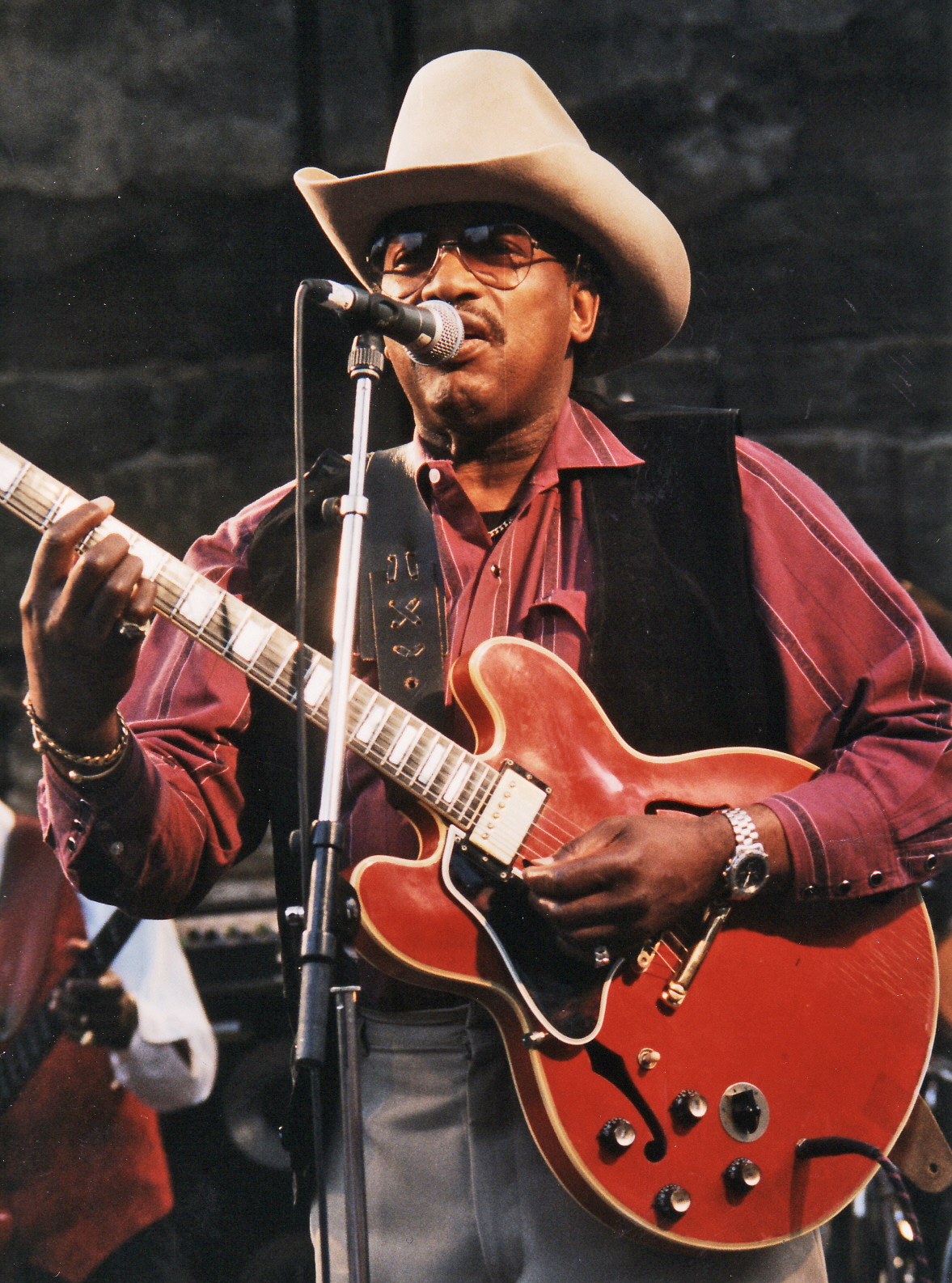
Otis Rush

- September 1
  - Irving Petlin, artist, liver cancer (b. 1934)
  - Randy Weston, jazz pianist and composer (b. 1926)
- September 2
  - Claire Wineland, cystic fibrosis assistance advocate, stroke (b. 1997)
  - Fred Zamberletti, athletic trainer (Minnesota Vikings) (b. 1932)
- September 3
  - Lydia Clarke, actress (The Atomic City) and photographer, complications from pneumonia (b. 1923)
  - Thomas Rickman, screenwriter (Coal Miner's Daughter, Hooper, Truman), cancer (b. 1940)
- September 4
  - Bill Daily, American actor (b. 1927)
  - Christopher Lawford, American actor, author and activist (b. 1955)
- September 5
  - Minor J. Coon, American biochemist (b. 1921)
  - Erik Hauri, American geochemist (b. 1966)
  - Arthur Lawrence Hellyer Jr., American radio and television broadcaster (b. 1923)
  - Mike Hogewood, American sportscaster and professional wrestling commentator (b. 1955)
  - Dick Lane, American baseball player (b. 1927)
  - Madeleine Yayodele Nelson, American musician (b. 1949)
  - Vince Phason, American football player (b. 1953)
  - Rudolph Edward Torrini, American sculptor (b. 1923)
- September 6
  - Richard DeVos, salesman and billionaire, co-founder of Amway, complications from infection (b. 1926)
  - Botham Jean, murder victim (b. 1991)
  - Burt Reynolds, actor (Smokey and the Bandit, Boogie Nights, Deliverance), Emmy winner (1991), heart attack (b. 1936)
- September 7
  - Samuel Bodman, politician (b. 1938)
  - Mac Miller, rapper, singer and producer, drug overdose (b. 1992)
- September 8 – Chelsi Smith, American singer and beauty pageant winner (b. 1973)
- September 9
  - Frank Davis, American politician (b. 1936)
  - Adrian C. Louis, American author and screenwriter (b. 1946)
  - Paul Stuffel, American baseball player (b. 1927)
  - Wallace Tripp, American illustrator (b. 1940)
- September 10
  - Chris Buttars, American politician (b. 1942)
  - Adam Clymer, American journalist (b. 1937)
  - Warrington Colescott, American artist (b. 1921)
  - Peter Donat, Canadian-American actor (b. 1928)
  - Albin F. Irzyk, American military officer (b. 1917)
  - Roy Wagner, American anthropologist (b. 1939)
- September 11
  - Richard Newbold Adams, American anthropologist (b. 1924)
  - Peter J. Barnes Jr., American politician (b. 1929)
  - Thomas Aquinas Higgins, American judge (b. 1932)
  - Jim Houston, American football player (b. 1938)
  - Siegfried Linkwitz, American audio engineer (b. 1936)
  - Don Newman, American basketball coach and football player (b. 1958)
  - Don Panoz, American executive (b. 1935)
- September 13 – Marin Mazzie, American actress and singer (b. 1960)
- September 14
  - Alan Abel, American prankster and writer (b. 1924)
  - Max Bennett, American jazz bassist (b. 1928)
  - Beverly Bentley, American actress (b. 1930)
  - Phil Clark, American baseball player (b. 1932)
- September 16
  - Big Jay McNeely, American rhythm and blues saxophonist (b. 1927)
  - Frank Parker, American actor (b. 1939)
- September 17
  - Annette Michelson, American film and art critic (b. 1923)
  - Daniel N. Robinson, American philosopher (b. 1937)
- September 18
  - David DiChiera, American composer and founding general director of Michigan Opera Theatre (b. 1935)
  - Richard M. Pollack, American mathematician (b. 1935)
  - Robert Venturi, American architect (b. 1925)
- September 19 – Arthur Mitchell, American ballet dancer and choreographer (b. 1934)
- September 20
  - K-Run's Park Me in First, American beagle show dog (b. 2005)
  - Lou Karras, American football player (b. 1927)
  - Laurie Mitchell, American actress (b. 1928)
  - William Ward, American astronomer (b. 1944)
  - Henry Wessel Jr., American photographer (b. 1942)
- September 21
  - Katherine Hoover, American composer and flutist (b. 1938)
  - David Laro, American judge (b. 1942)
  - Howard Michaels, American businessman (b. 1956)
  - Lee Stange, American baseball player (b. 1937)
- September 23
  - Jane Fortune, American author, journalist and historian (b. 1942)
  - Gary Kurtz, American film producer (b. 1940)
  - Mark Livolsi, American film editor (b. 1962)
  - John Anthony Nevin, American psychologist (b. 1933)
  - David Wolkowsky, American property developer (b. 1919)
- September 24
  - Norm Breyfogle, American comic book artist (b. 1960)
  - Arnold Krammer, American historian (b. 1941)
  - Tommy McDonald, American football player (b. 1934)
  - Michael O'Gorman, American coxswain (b. 1965)
- September 25
  - Charles Berger, American communication theorist (b. 1939)
  - Marie Colton, American politician (b. 1923)
  - Jack McKinney, American basketball coach (b. 1935)
  - Ronnie Shelton, American convicted serial rapist (b. 1961)
  - Jerry Thorpe, American director and producer (b. 1926)
- September 27 – Marty Balin, American singer and musician (b. 1942)
- September 29 – Otis Rush, American blues guitarist and singer (b. 1934)
- September 30
  - Michael J. Bennane, American politician (b. 1945)
  - Walter Laqueur, German-born American historian and journalist (b. 1921)
  - John J. McDermott, American philosopher (b. 1932)
  - Robert M. O'Neil, American educator (b. 1935)
  - William Proffit, American orthodontist (b. 1936)

=== October ===
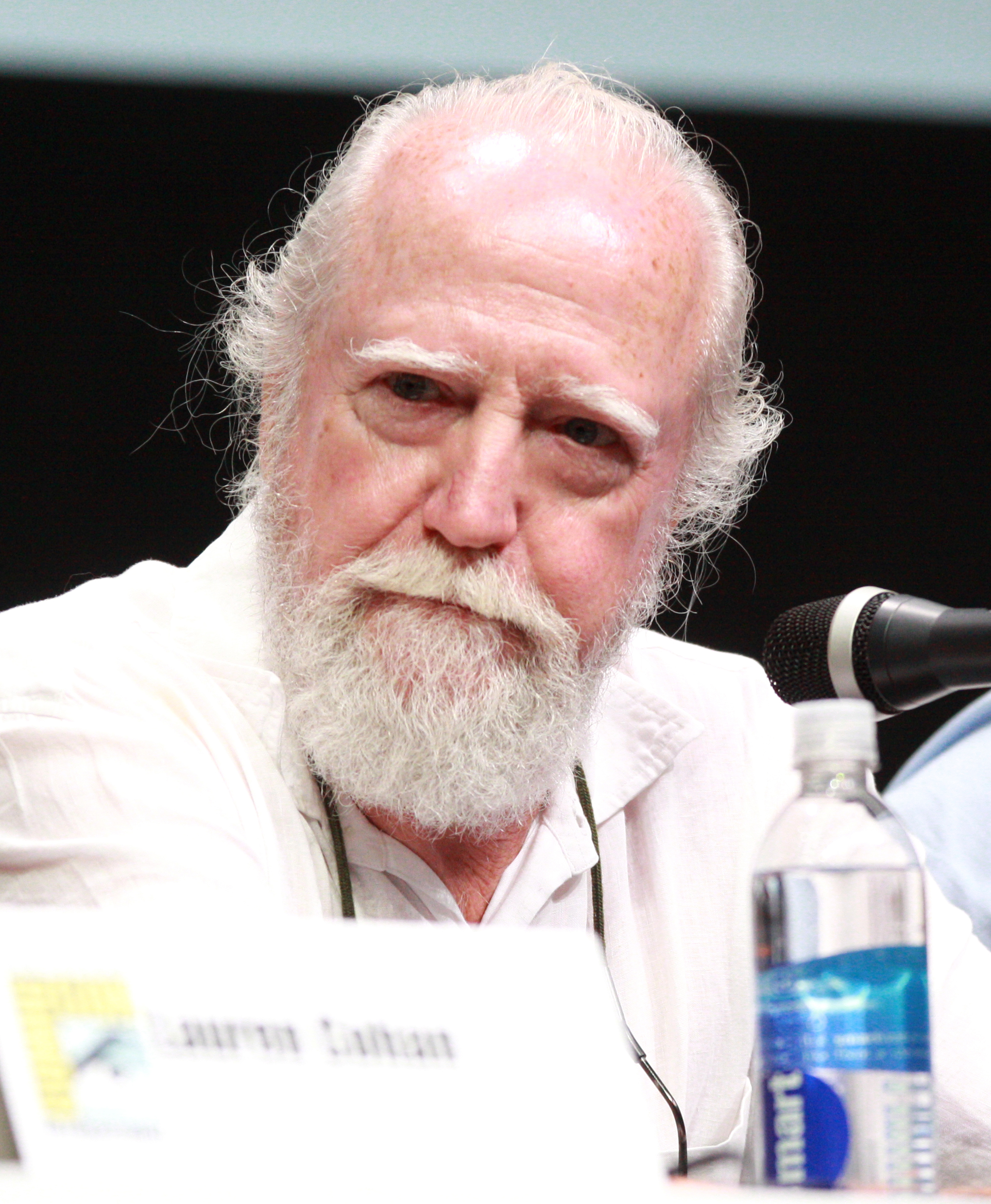
Scott Wilson

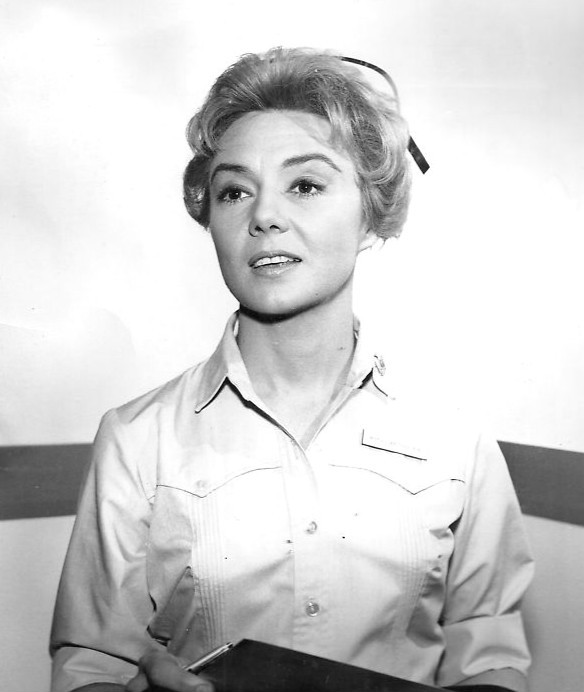
Peggy McCay

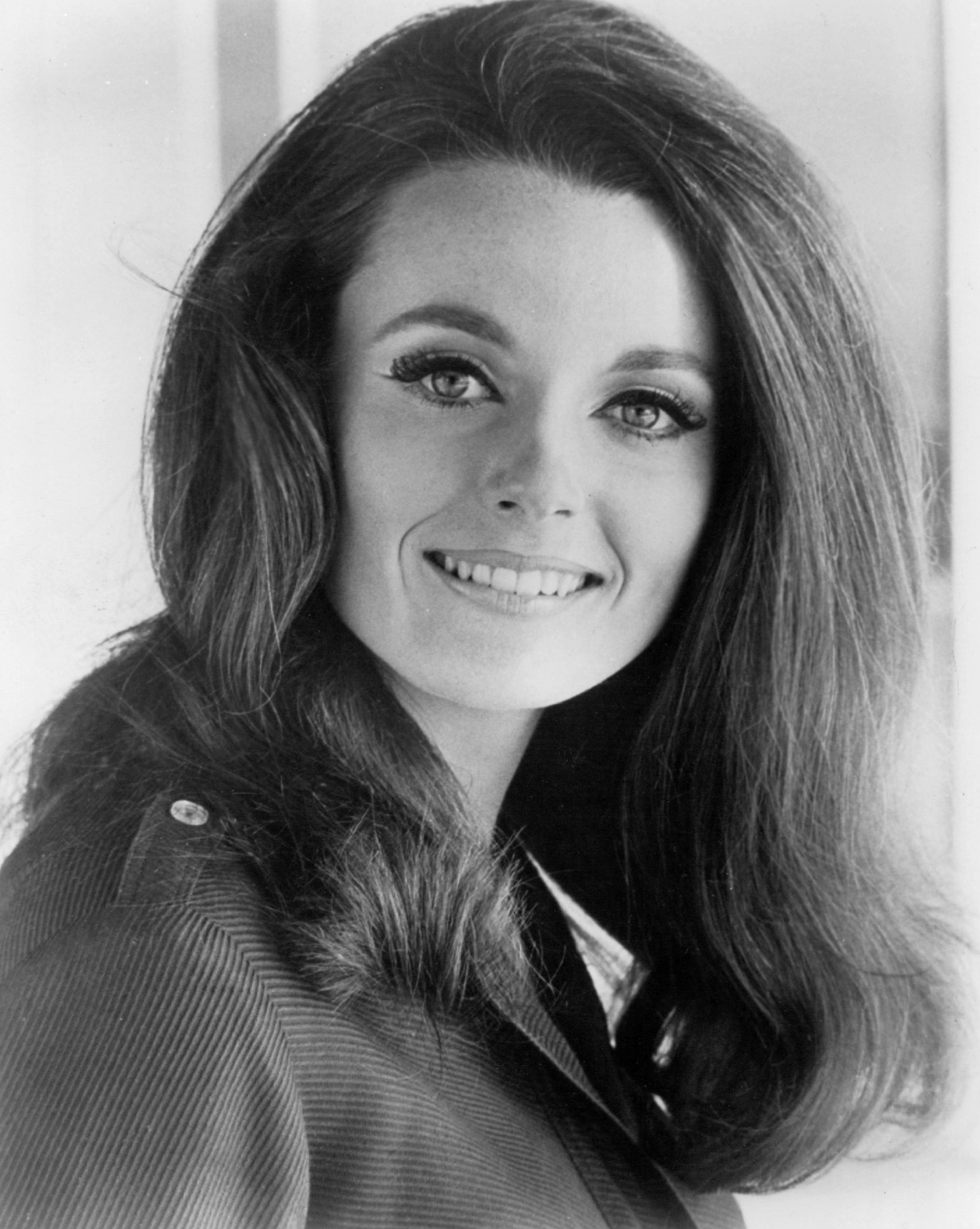
Celeste Yarnall

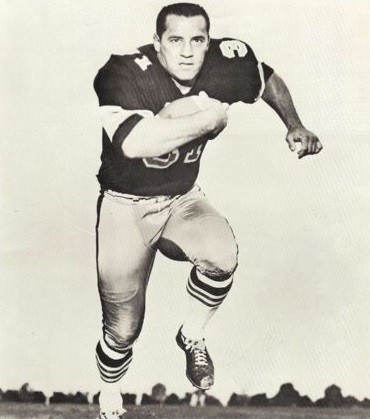
Jim Taylor

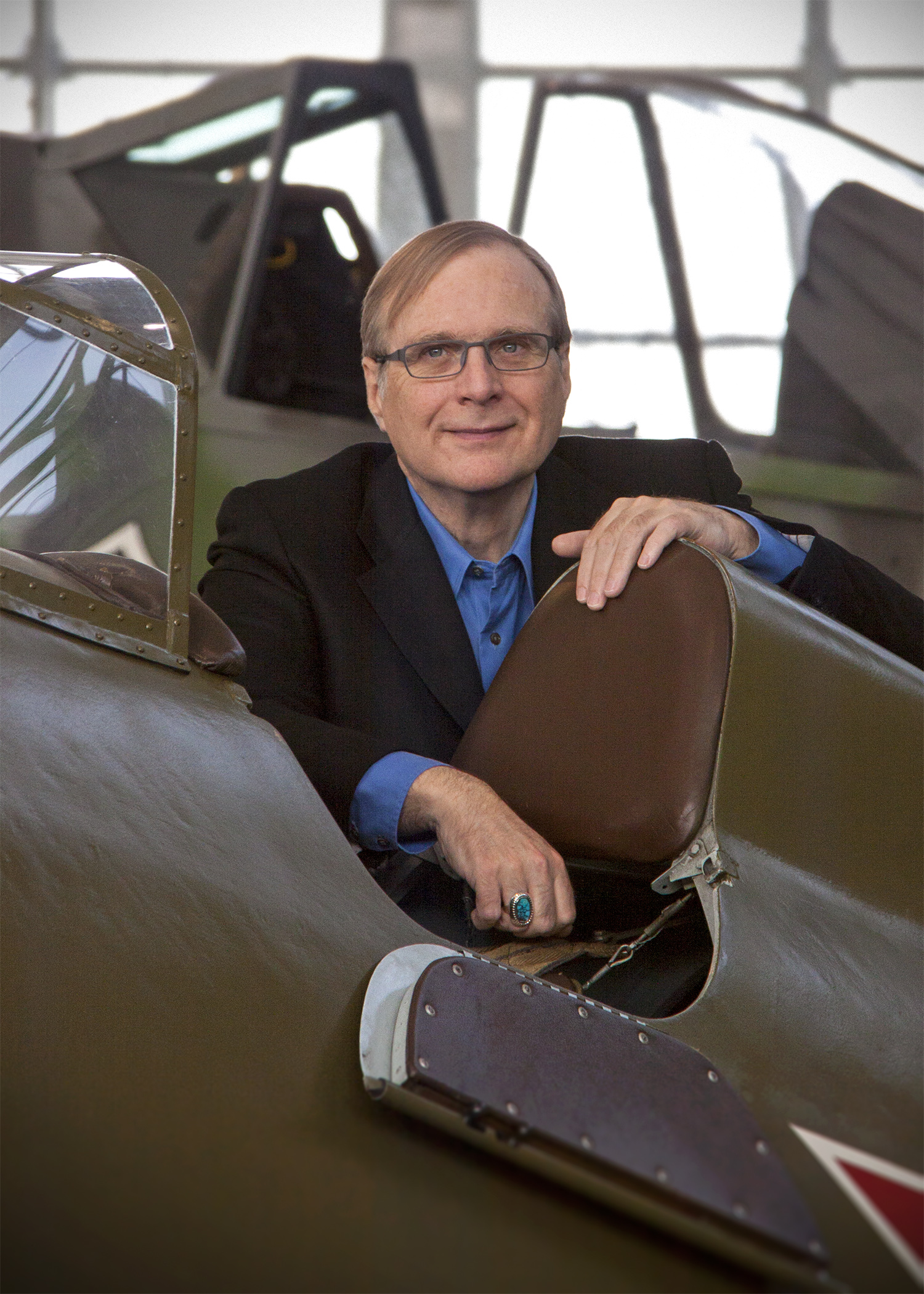
Paul Allen

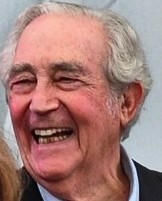
James Karen

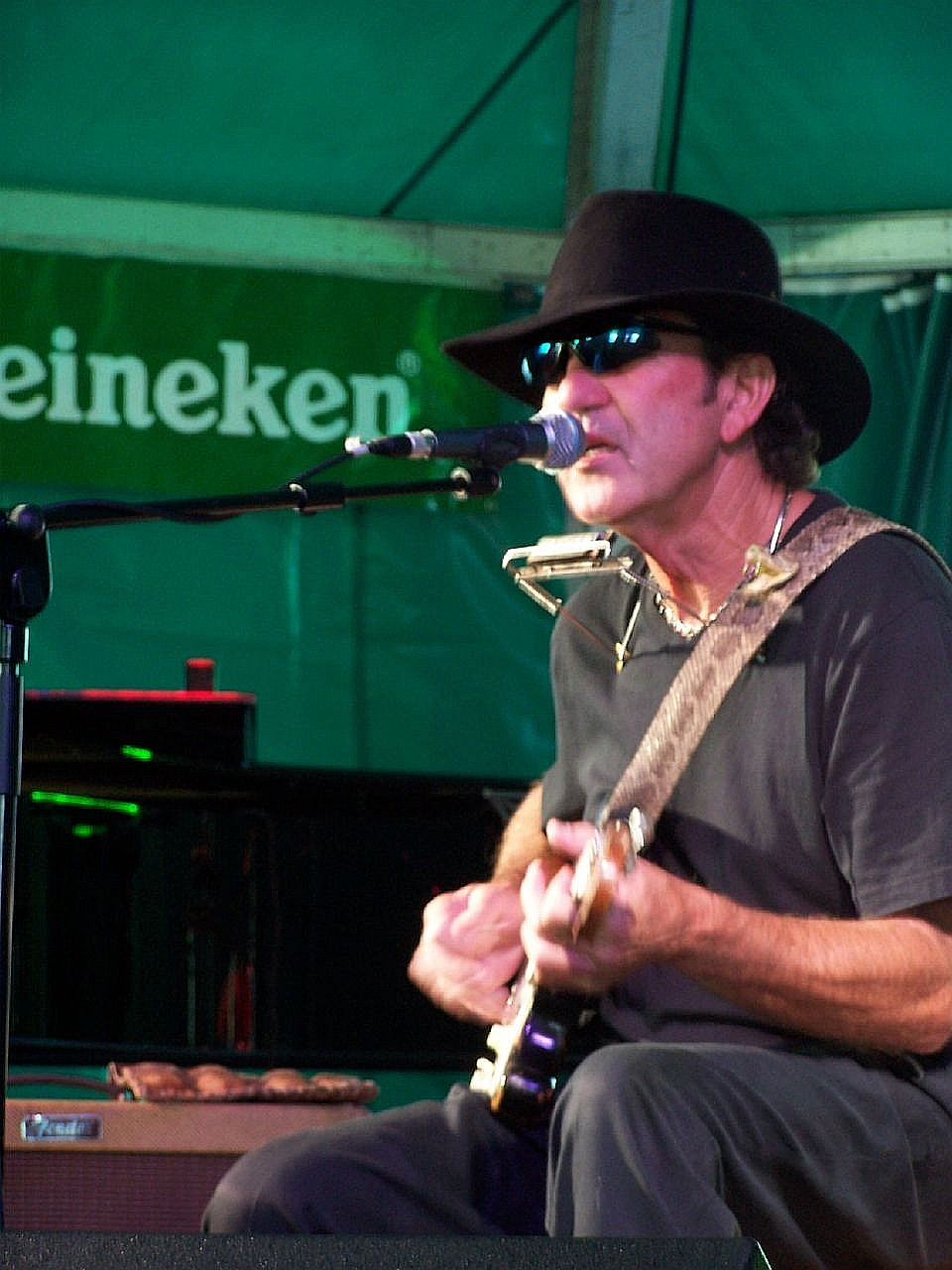
Tony Joe White

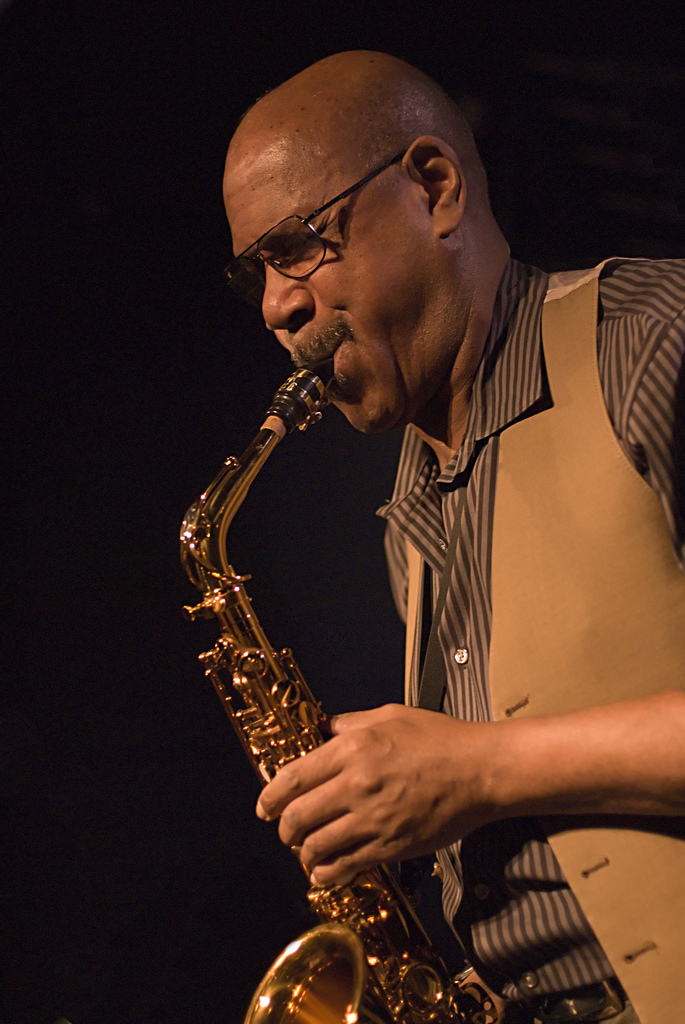
Sonny Fortune

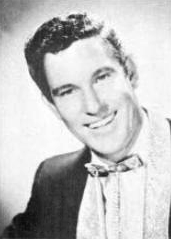
Freddie Hart

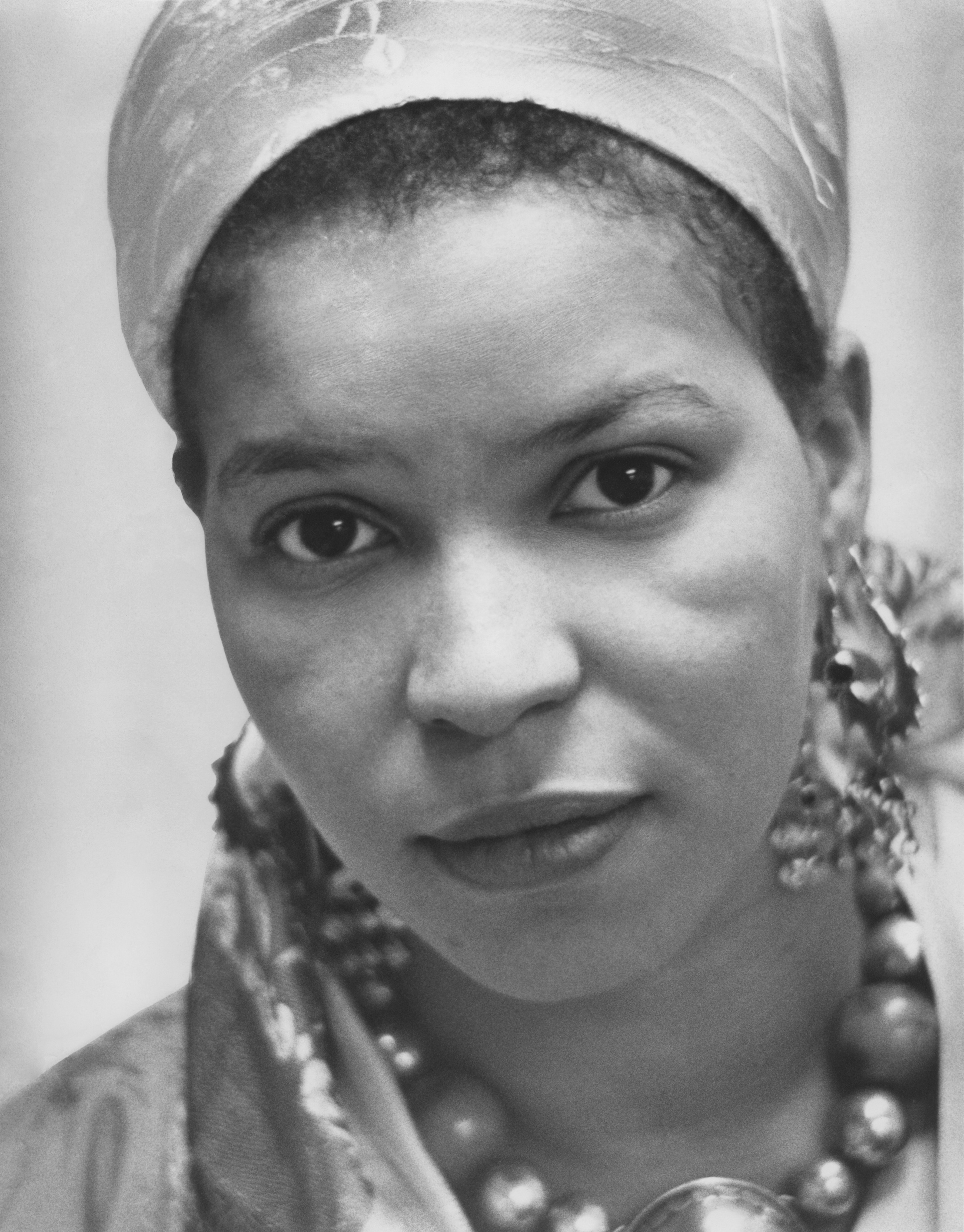
Ntozake Shange

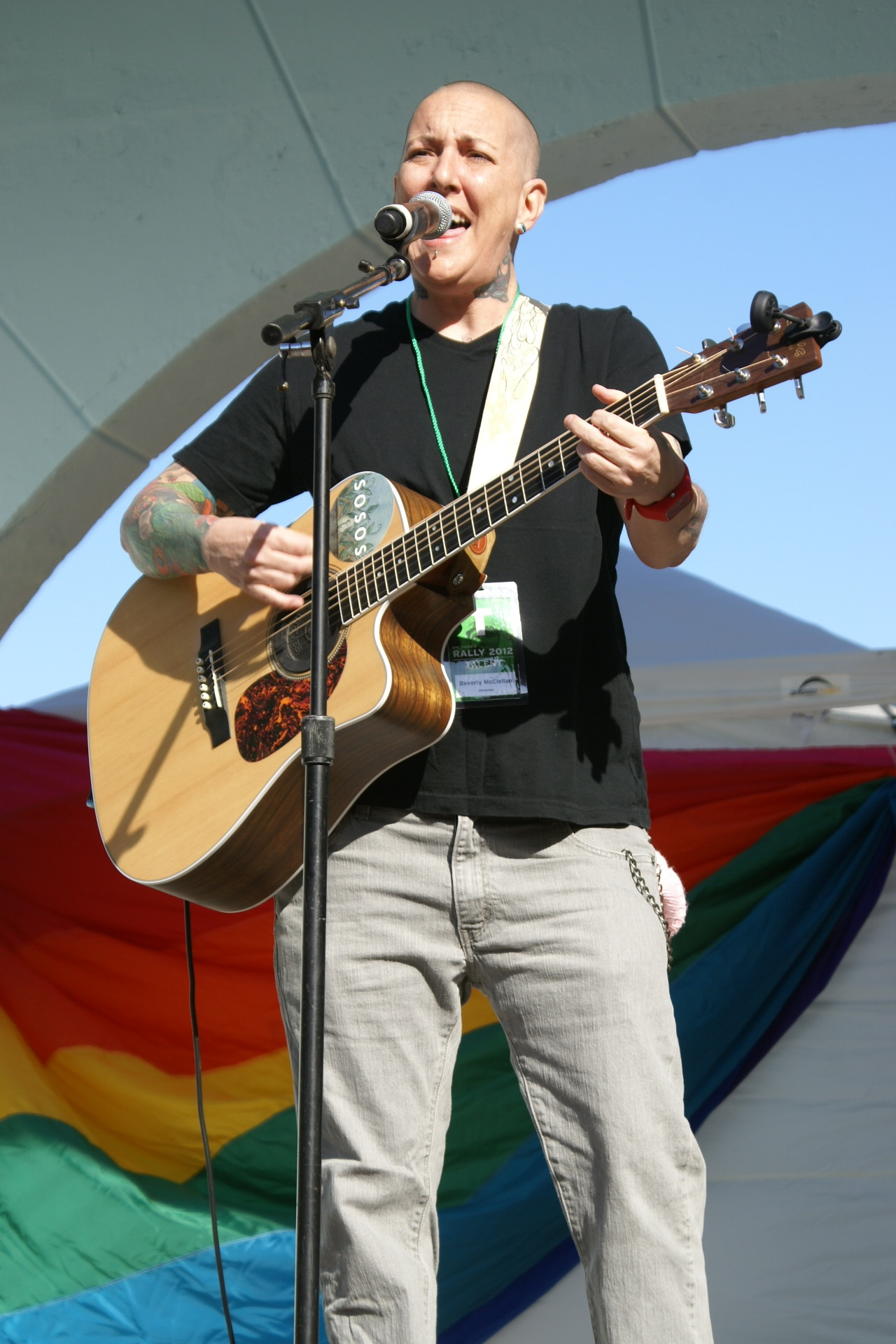
Beverly McClellan

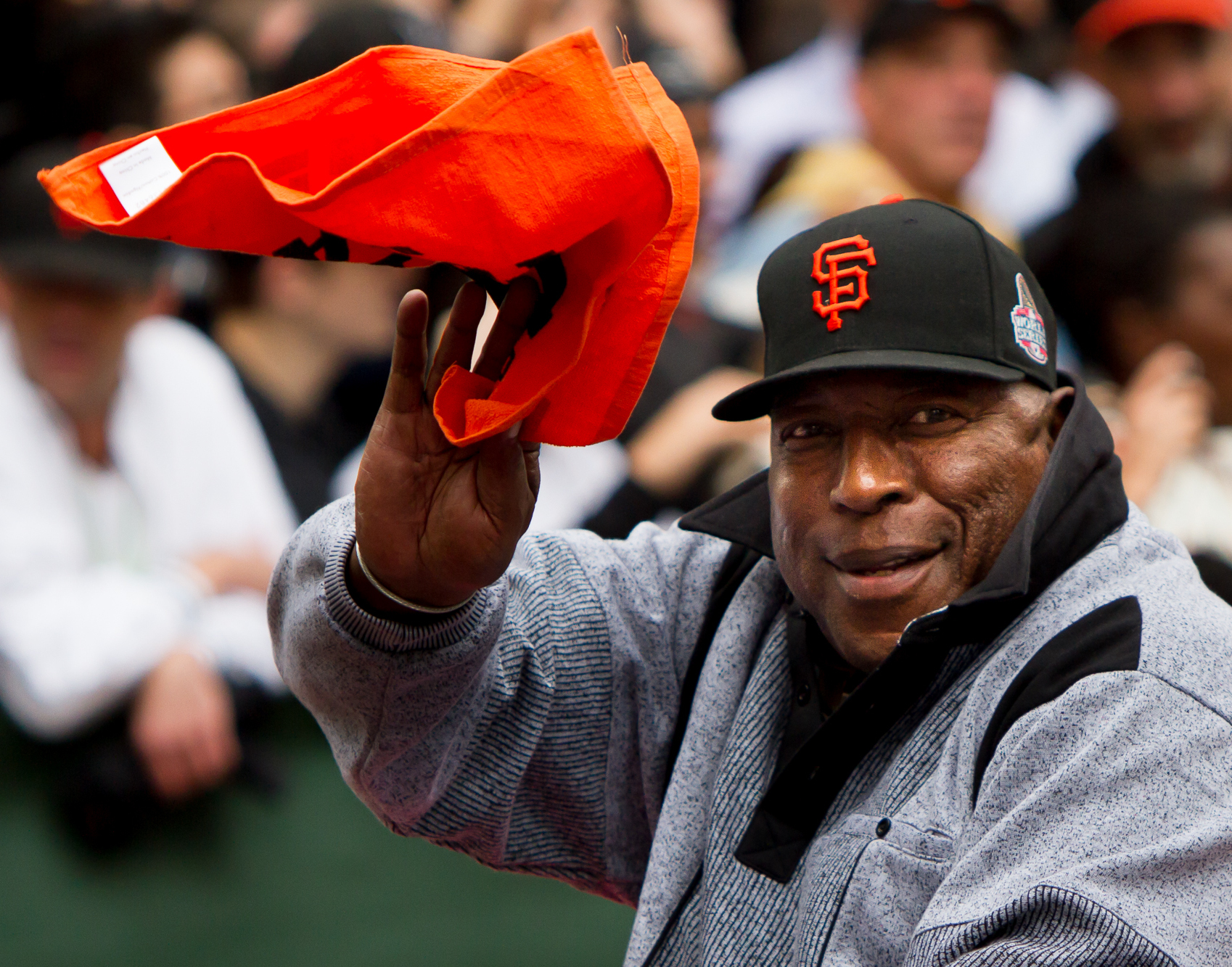
Willie McCovey

- October 1
  - Peter C. Bjarkman, American baseball historian and author (b. 1941)
  - John H. Bryan, American business executive and philanthropist (b. 1936)
  - Jerry González, American bandleader and trumpeter (b. 1949)
  - Darryl Greenamyer, American aviator and record holder (b. 1936)
- October 2 – Dorothy Hukill, American politician (b. 1946)
- October 3
  - Leon M. Lederman, American Nobel physicist (b. 1922)
  - Marty Pattin, American baseball player (b. 1943)
  - Hollie Pihl, American judge (b. 1928)
  - John Von Ohlen, American jazz drummer (Blue Wisp Big Band) (b. 1941)
  - Edward E. Williams, American economist (b. 1945)
- October 4
  - Dave Anderson, American sportswriter (b. 1929)
  - Will Vinton, American animator (b. 1947)
  - Audrey Wells, American screenwriter, director, and producer (b. 1960)
- October 5
  - Wayne Berry, American football player (b. 1932)
  - Louis A. DeSimone, American Roman Catholic prelate (b. 1922)
  - Ed Kenney, American singer and actor (b. 1933)
  - Herbert Kleber, American psychiatrist (b. 1934)
  - Greg Marx, American football player (b. 1950)
- October 6 – Scott Wilson, American actor (b. 1942)
- October 7
  - Paul Henle, American politician (b. 1949)
  - Peggy McCay, American actress (b. 1927)
  - Celeste Yarnall, American actress (b. 1944)
- October 8
  - Arnold Kopelson, American film producer (b. 1935)
  - George Taliaferro, American football player (b. 1927)
- October 9
  - Carolyn Blanchard Allen, American politician (b. 1921)
  - Robert Bausch, American author (b. 1945)
  - Thomas M. Hannigan, American politician (b. 1940)
  - Diane Jergens, American actress (b. 1935)
  - Larry Larrañaga, American politician (b. 1938)
  - Frank Padavan, American politician (b. 1935)
  - Warner Saunders, American news anchor (b. 1935)
  - Alex Spanos, American billionaire and real estate developer (b. 1923)
  - Thomas A. Steitz, American Nobel biochemist (b. 1940)
  - Carolyn Warner, American politician (b. 1930)
  - William Wilbanks, American criminologist (b. 1940)
- October 10
  - Louis Brouillard, American Roman Catholic priest (b. 1921)
  - Frank Deem, American politician (b. 1928)
  - Don Eddy, American baseball player (b. 1947)
  - Theresa Hightower, American jazz singer (b. 1954)
  - Raye Montague, American naval engineer (b. 1935)
  - Richard T. Morgan, American politician (b. 1952)
  - Bruce N. Whitman, American aviation executive (b. 1933)
  - Tex Winter, American football player and coach (b. 1922)
- October 11
  - Robert Dean, American ufologist (b. 1929)
  - James Emswiller, American sound mixer (b. 1957)
  - Milton Gendel, American-Italian photographer and art critic (b. 1919)
  - Carol Hall, American composer and lyricist (b. 1936)
  - Greg Stafford, American game designer (b. 1948)
- October 12
  - Colleen Conway-Welch, American academic administrator (b. 1944)
  - A. G. Russell, American knife maker (b. 1933)
- October 13
  - William Coors, American brewer (Coors Brewing Company) (b. 1916)
  - Edgar S. Harris Jr., American Air Force lieutenant general (b. 1925)
  - Sue Hubbell, American author (b. 1935)
  - Don Leo Jonathan, American-Canadian professional wrestler (b. 1931)
  - Jim Taylor, American football player (b. 1935)
  - Johannes Weertman, American geophysicist (b. 1925)
- October 15 – Paul Allen, co-founder of Microsoft, non-Hodgkin lymphoma (b. 1953)
- October 18
  - Elihu Abrahams, American theoretical physicist (b. 1927)
  - Todd Bol, American teacher (b. 1956)
  - Dick Cole, 92, American baseball player
  - Randolph Hokanson, 103, American classical pianist
  - Danny Leiner, 57, American film director
  - Dick Slater, 67, American professional wrestler
- October 19
  - Charles Y. Glock, American sociologist (b. 1919)
  - Victor Marchetti, American CIA agent and author (b. 1930)
  - Dick Modzelewski, American football player (b. 1931)
  - Diana Sowle, American actress (b. 1930)
- October 21
  - Earl Bakken, American pacemaker inventor and museum founder (b. 1924)
  - Harry L. Ettlinger, American engineer (b. 1926)
  - John Hill, American football player (b. 1950)
  - Harold Stevenson, American painter (b. 1929)
- October 22 – Hank Greenwald, American sportscaster (b. 1935)
- October 23
  - James Karen, American actor (b. 1923)
  - Max Webb Polish-born American real estate developer and philanthropist (b. 1917)
- October 24
  - Michael J. O'Connor, American politician (b. 1929)
  - Melvin Ragin, American guitarist (b. 1950)
  - Tony Joe White, American singer-songwriter (b. 1943)
- October 25
  - Joyce Crouch, American politician (b. 1935).
  - Sonny Fortune, American jazz saxophonist (b. 1939)
  - Elder Roma Wilson, American gospel harmonist (b. 1910)
- October 26
  - Warren B. Hamilton, American geologist (b. 1925)
  - Russ Mobley, American politician (b. 1934)
- October 27
  - Richard L. Bloch, American businessman and sports team owner (b. 1929)
  - Perry Lee Dunn, American football player (b. 1941)
  - Freddie Hart, American country singer and songwriter (b. 1926)
  - Fred Hess, American tenor saxophonist (b. 1944)
  - Mario Segale, American real estate developer (b. 1934)
  - Ntozake Shange, American playwright and poet (b. 1948)
  - Todd Youth, American punk and metal guitarist (b. 1971)
- October 28
  - Peter Everwine, American poet (b. 1930)
  - I. John Hesselink, American theologian (b. 1928)
  - Eldridge M. Moores, American geologist (b. 1938)
  - Bill Trumbo, American college basketball coach (b. 1939)
- October 29
  - William F. Bernhard, American cardiovascular surgeon (b. 1925)
  - Bernard Bragg, American actor (b. 1928)
  - Jimmy Farrar, American rock singer (b. 1950)
  - Larry Snyder, American jockey (b. 1942)
  - Young Greatness, American rapper (b. 1984)
- October 30
  - Whitey Bulger, American mobster (b. 1929)
  - Bill Fischer, American baseball player (b. 1930)
  - María Irene Fornés, Cuban-American playwright (b. 1930)
  - Rae Ann Kelsch, American politician (b. 1960)
  - Frank Litsky, American sports columnist (b. 1926)
  - Beverly McClellan, American singer and contestant of "The Voice" (b. 1969)
  - Bob Skoronski, American football player (b. 1934)
  - Steven L. Zinter, American judge (b. 1950)
- October 31 – Willie McCovey, American baseball player (b. 1938)

=== November ===
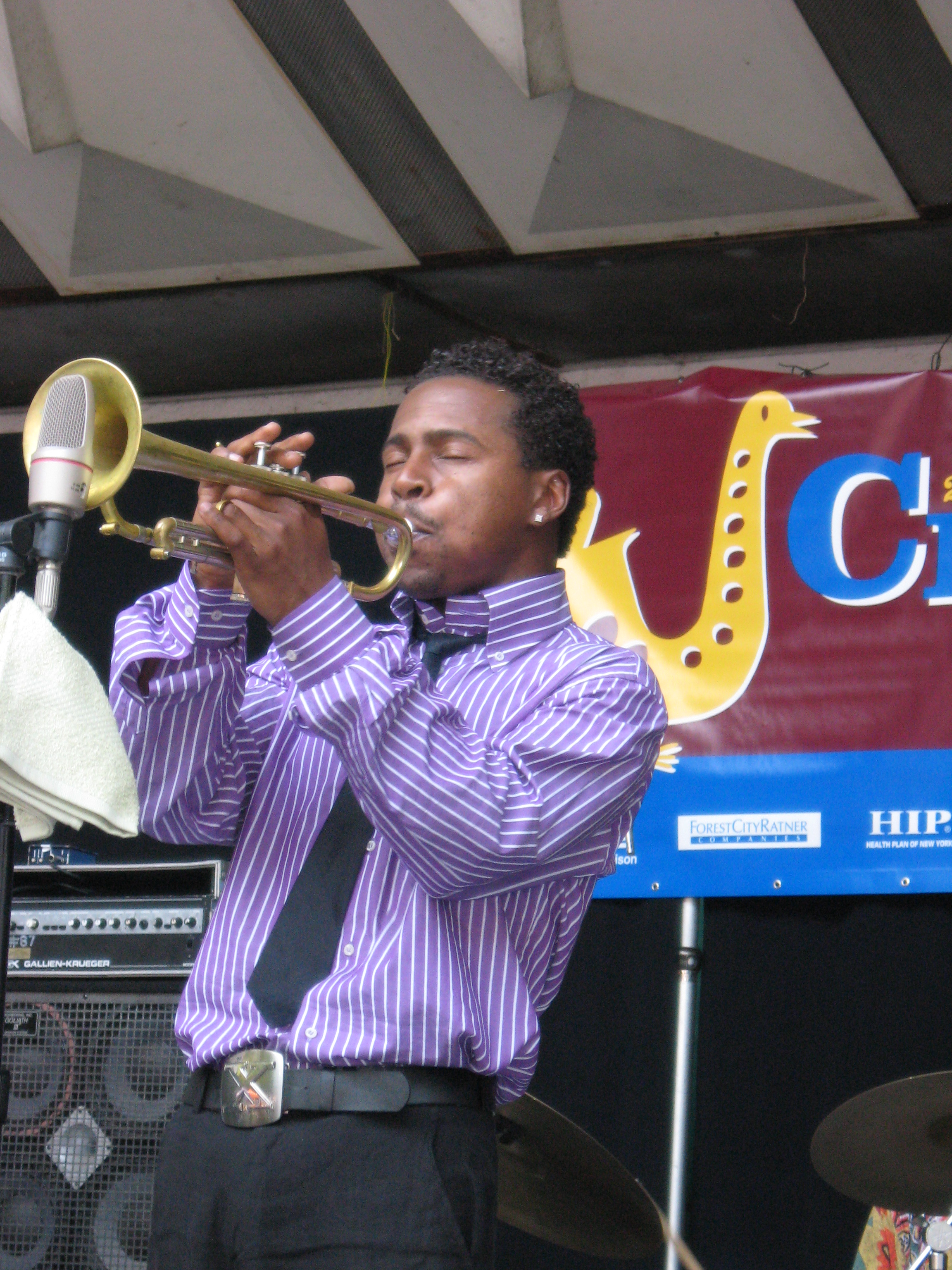
Roy Hargrove

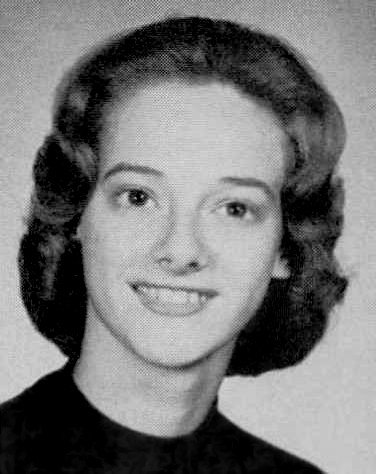
Sondra Locke

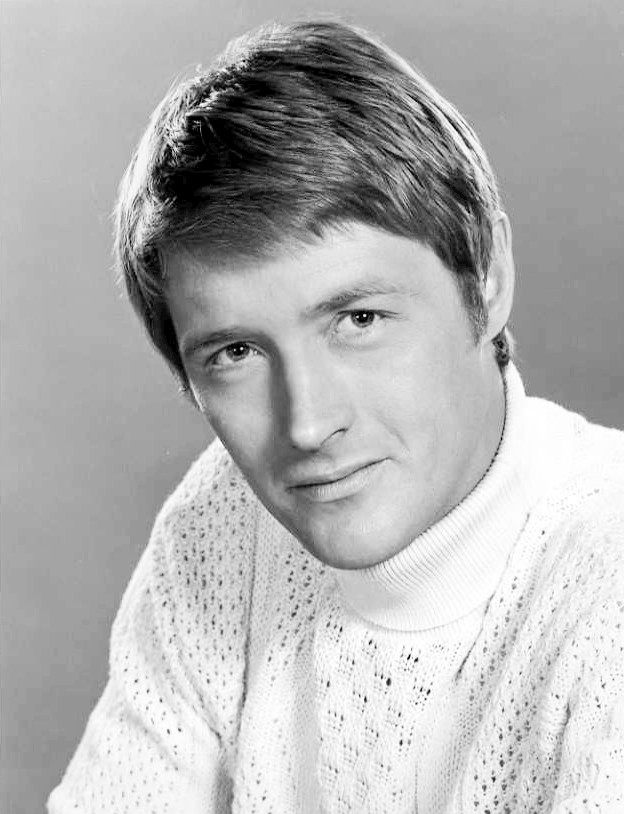
Wayne Maunder

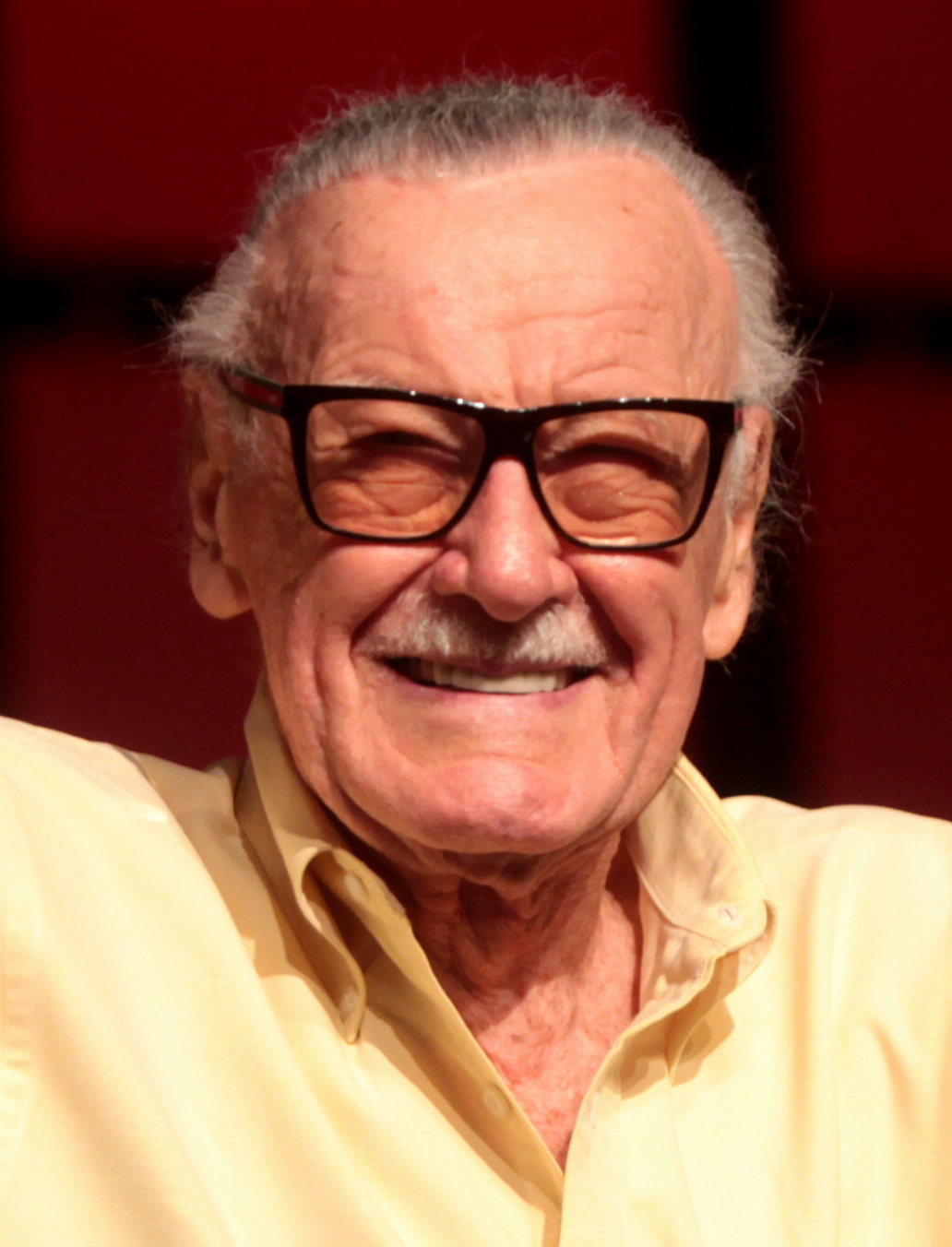
Stan Lee

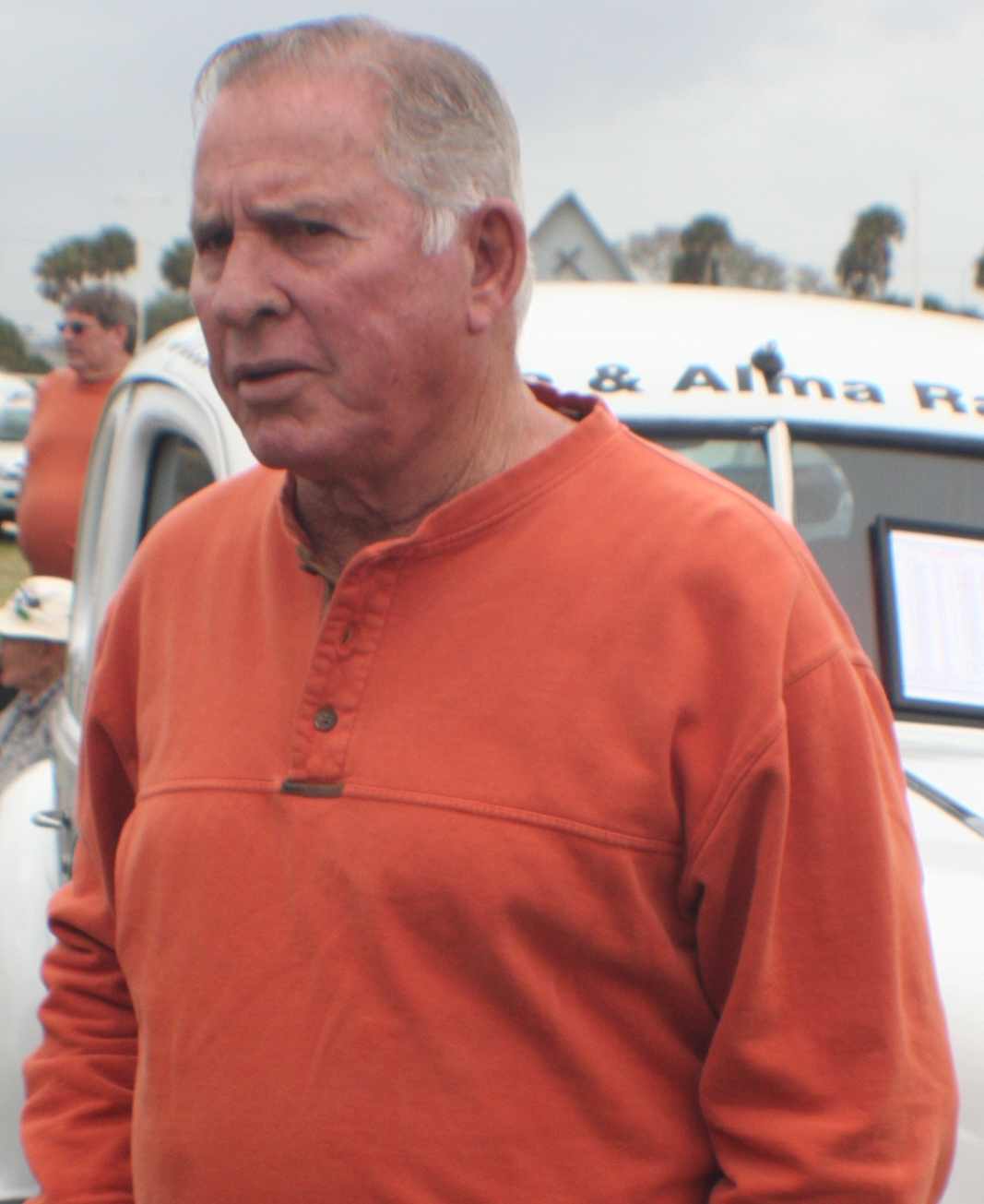
David Pearson

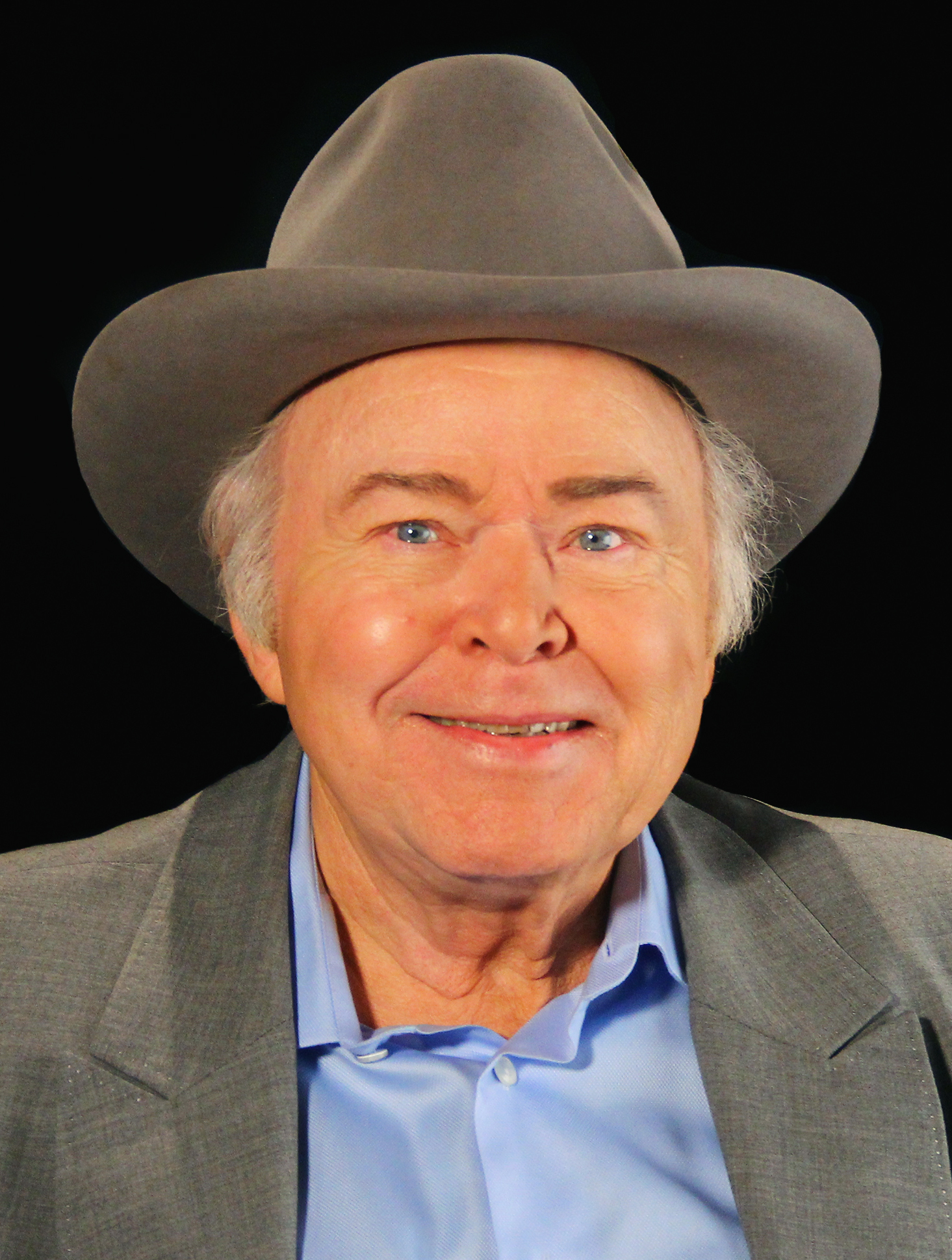
Roy Clark

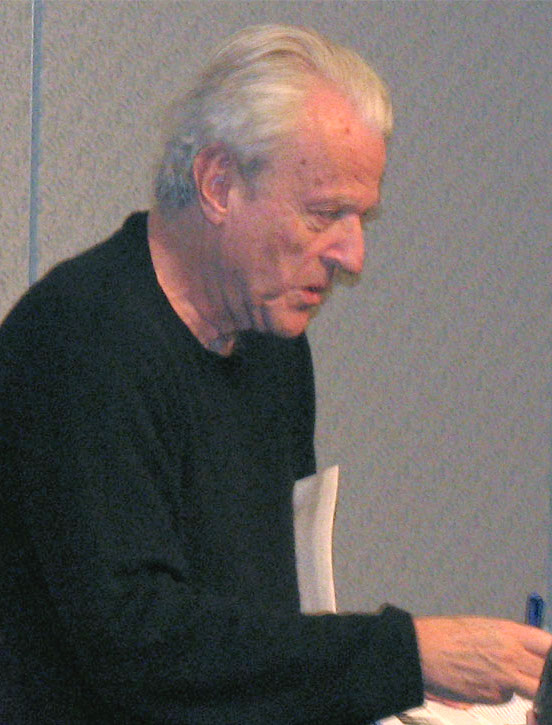
William Goldman

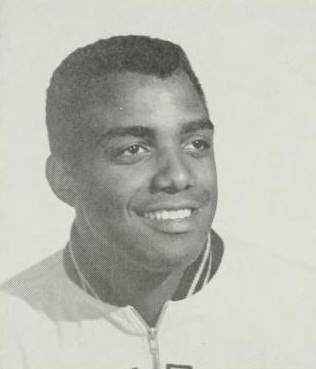
Willie Naulls

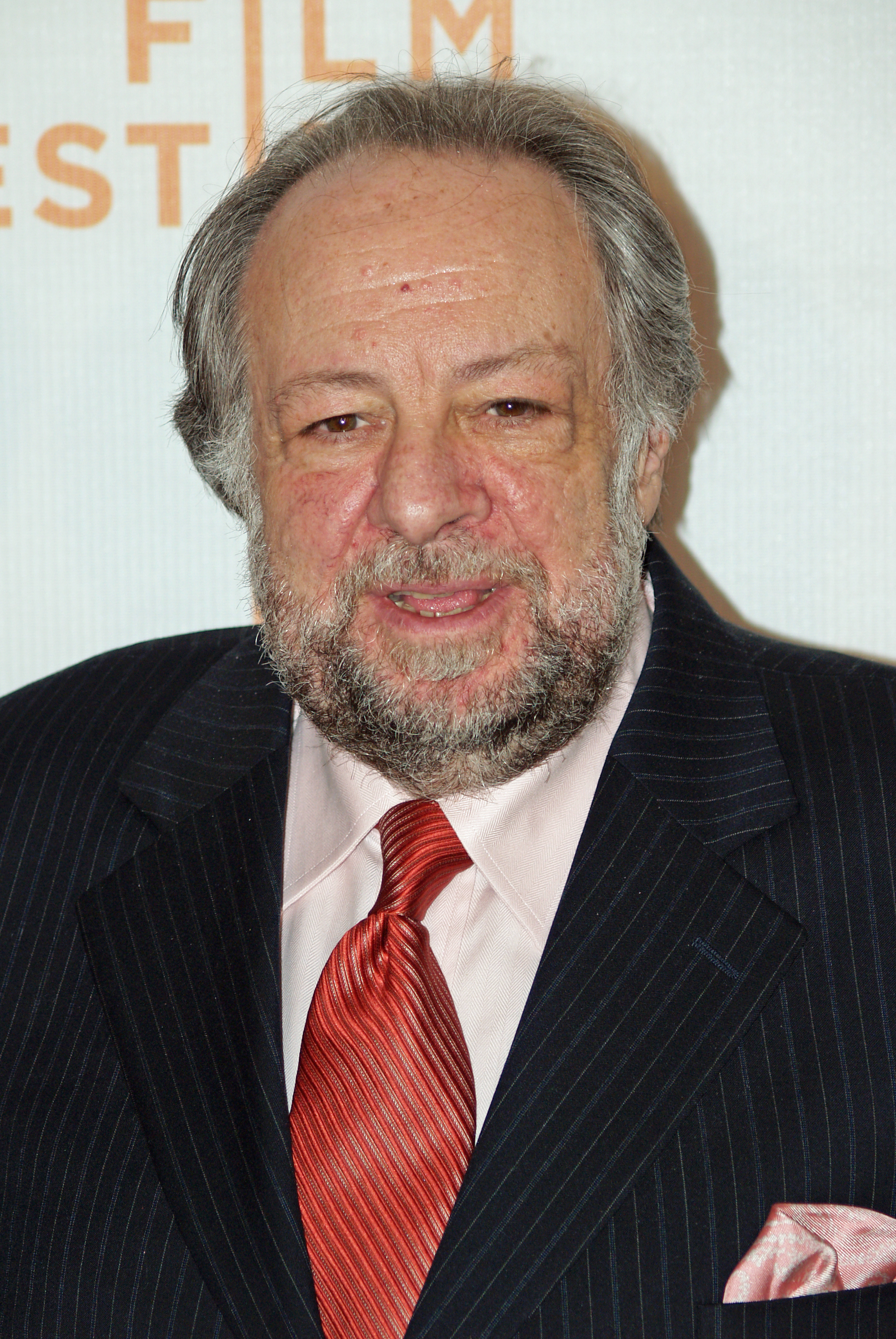
Ricky Jay

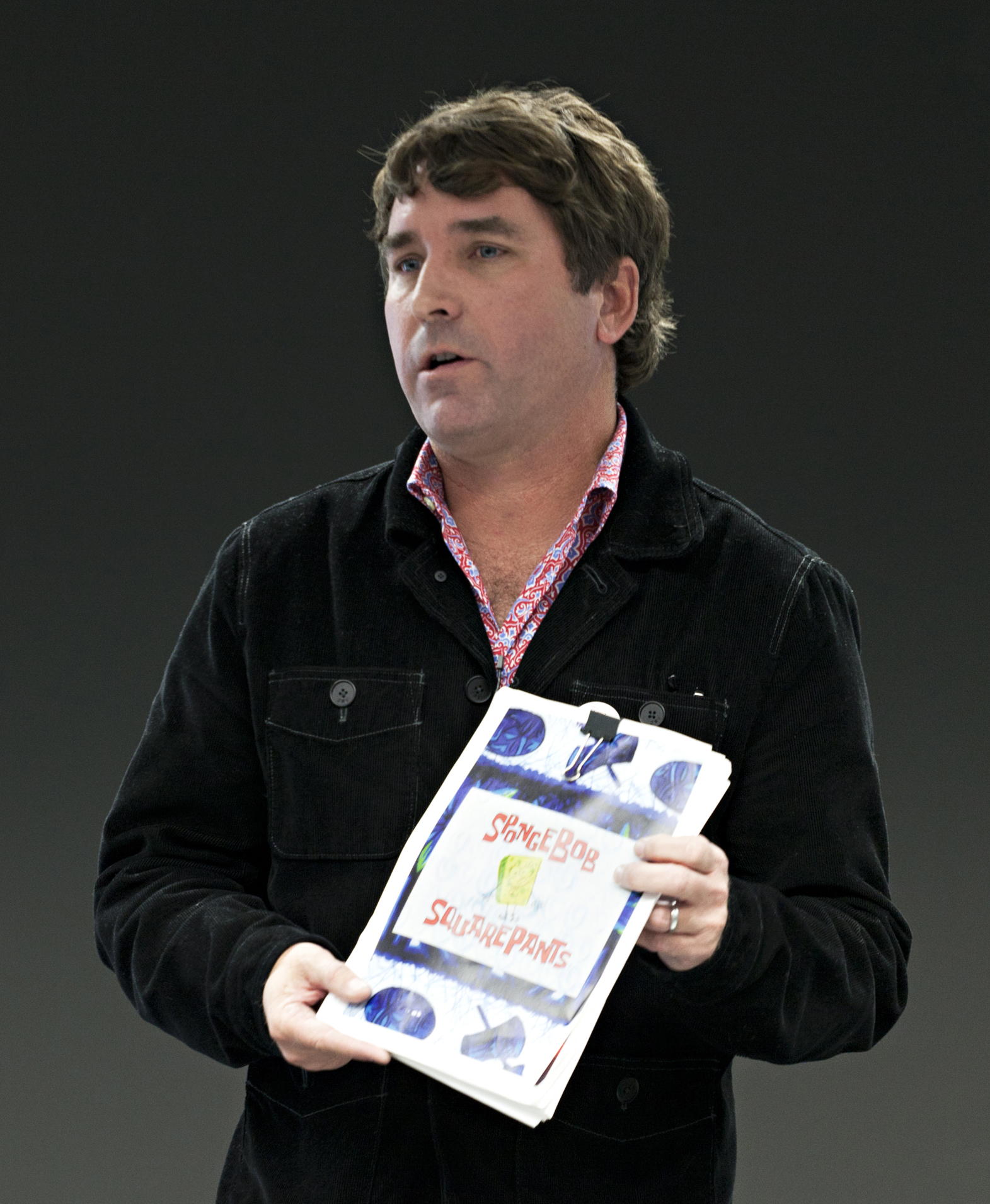
Stephen Hillenburg

George H. W. Bush

- November 1
  - Terry Musser, American politician (b. 1948)
  - Dave Pickerell, American distiller (b. 1956)
  - Ken Swofford, American actor (b. 1933)
  - Edmund Zagorski, American convicted double murderer (b. 1954)
  - Paul Zimmerman, American sportswriter (b. 1932)
- November 2
  - Roy Hargrove, American jazz trumpeter (b. 1969)
  - Kitty O'Neil, American stuntwoman and racer (b. 1946)
- November 3
  - Joe Clayton, American business executive (b. 1949)
  - Eddie Foy III, American casting director (b. 1935)
  - Mari Hulman George, chairperson of the Indianapolis Motor Speedway (b. 1934)
  - Sondra Locke, American actress (b. 1944)
  - John Marttila, American political strategist (b. 1940)
  - Ramona Ripston, American civil rights activist (b. 1927)
  - Eric Schiller, American chess player and author (b. 1955)
  - Brent R. Taylor, American military officer (b. 1979)
  - J. Willard Thompson, American racehorse trainer (b. 1935)
- November 4
  - Donna Axum, American model and beauty pageant winner (b. 1942)
  - Bill Brown, American football player (b. 1938)
  - Jack Gargan, American politician (b. 1930)
  - Tetsugen Bernard Glassman, American Zen Buddhist monk (b. 2939)
  - Katherine Herring, American baseball player (b. 1933)
  - Harris Hines, American judge (b. 1950)
  - Vince Manuwai, American football player (b. 1980)
  - Grant R. Osborne, American theologian (b. 1942)
  - Mike Parker, American news reporter (b. 1943)
  - Douglas Turner, American Olympic rower (b. 1932)
- November 5
  - Keith Christiansen, Canadian-born American ice hockey player (b. 1944)
  - Rick Reinert, American animator (b. 1925)
  - Hugh Wilson, American botanist (b. 1943)
- November 6
  - Frances M. López-Morillas, American translator of Spanish literature (b. 1918)
  - Hartman Rector Jr., American general authority of the Church of Jesus Christ of Latter-day Saints (b. 1924)
  - Robert Stinnett, American sailor, photographer and author (b. 1924)
- November 7
  - Robert Anthony Brucato, American Roman Catholic prelate (b. 1931)
  - Walt Kowalczyk, American football player (b. 1935)
  - Bob Patterson, American college basketball player (b. 1932)
- November 8
  - Bonnie Cooper, American baseball player (b. 1935)
  - Bill Godbout, American computer scientist (b. 1939)
  - Chin Yang Lee, Chinese-born American author (b. 1916)
  - Riccardo Levi-Setti, Italian-born American physicist and professor (b. 1927)
  - Ron Negray, American baseball player (b. 1930)
  - Raymond Plank, American businessman (b. 1922)
  - Wallace Triplett, American football player (b. 1926)
  - Marvin Zuckerman, American psychologist (b. 1928)
- November 9
  - Dorothy Cheney, American scientist (b. 1950)
  - Richard Paul Conaboy, American judge (b. 1925)
  - James Greene, American actor (b. 1927)
  - Ken Howell, American baseball player (b. 1961)
  - Roger W. Hunt, American politician (b. 1938)
  - Barre Toelken, American folklorist (b. 1935)
- November 10
  - Ron Johnson, American football player (b. 1947)
  - Herbert London, American political activist and commentator (b. 1939)
  - Liz J. Patterson, American politician (b. 1940)
  - John Rogers, Canadian-born American businessman (b. 1961)
- November 11
  - Dominic Carmon, American Roman Catholic prelate (b. 1931)
  - Jerry Gant, American visual artist and poet (b. 1962)
  - Shakti Gawain, American author (b. 1948)
  - Wayne Maunder, Canadian-born American actor (b. 1938)
  - Donald McCaig, American writer (b. 1940)
  - Frankie Schneider, American racing driver (b. 1926)
- November 12
  - Stan Lee, comics artist and writer (Marvel Comics) (b. 1922)
  - David Pearson, American race car driver (b. 1934)
- November 13 – Katherine MacGregor, American actress (b. 1925)
- November 15
  - John Allen Chau, American missionary (b. 1991)
  - Roy Clark, American country singer (b. 1933)
- November 16
  - William Goldman, American novelist, playwright, and screenwriter (b. 1931)
  - Jane Maas, American advertising executive and author (b. 1932)
- November 17
  - Les Beasley, American southern gospel singer (b. 1928)
  - Gene Berce, American basketball player (b. 1927)
  - Kayo Dottley, American football player (b. 1928)
  - Jerry Frankel, American theater and film producer (b. 1930)
  - Cyril Pahinui, American slack-key guitarist and singer (b. 1950)
  - Mary Kay Stearns, American actress (b. 1925)
- November 18
  - Ethel Ayler, American actress (b. 1930)
  - Eddie Reeves, American songwriter (b. 1939)
- November 19
  - Larry Pierce, American country singer and comedian (b. 1950)
  - Shiao Yi, Taiwanese-American wuxia novelist (b. 1935)
- November 20
  - James H. Billington, American academic (b. 1929)
  - Eddie C. Campbell, American blues musician (b. 1939)
  - Mac Collins, American politician (b. 1944)
  - Henry Metzger, German-born American immunologist (b. 1932)
  - Wayne Stayskal, American cartoonist (b. 1932)
- November 21
  - Michele Carey, American actress (b. 1943)
  - Angelica Cob-Baehler, American music industry executive (b. 1971)
  - Dean Gitter, American entrepreneur and real estate developer (b. 1935)
  - Olivia Hooker, American civil rights figure (b. 1915)
  - Jose Peralta, American politician (b. 1971)
  - Emma Walker, American high school student and murder victim (b. 2000)
- November 22
  - Gerald Berenson, American cardiologist (b. 1922)
  - Willie Naulls, American basketball player (b. 1934)
  - Albert Ritzenberg, American tennis player and coach (b. 1918)
- November 23
  - Betty Bumpers, American childhood immunizations activist (b. 1925)
  - Bob McNair, 81 American businessman and sports club owner (b. 1937)
  - Shawn O'Hara, American politician (b. 1958)
- November 24 – Ricky Jay, American magician and actor (b. 1946)
- November 25
  - Randolph L. Braham, 95, Romanian-born American historian and political scientist (b. 1923)
  - Tony Hanson, American basketball player (b. 1955)
  - Gloria Katz, American screenwriter and producer (b. 1942)
  - Wright King, American actor (b. 1923)
  - Larry Matysik, American professional wrestling commentator and author (b. 1946)
  - Shep Shepherd, American jazz musician (b. 1917)
- November 26 – Stephen Hillenburg, marine biologist, cartoonist (SpongeBob SquarePants) (b. 1961)
- November 27
  - Johnny Maddox, American pianist (b. 1927)
  - Ed Pastor, U.S. Representative from Arizona (b. 1943)
- November 28 – Robert Morris, American sculptor (b. 1931)
- November 30 – George H. W. Bush, American politician, 41st president of the United States (b. 1924)

=== December ===
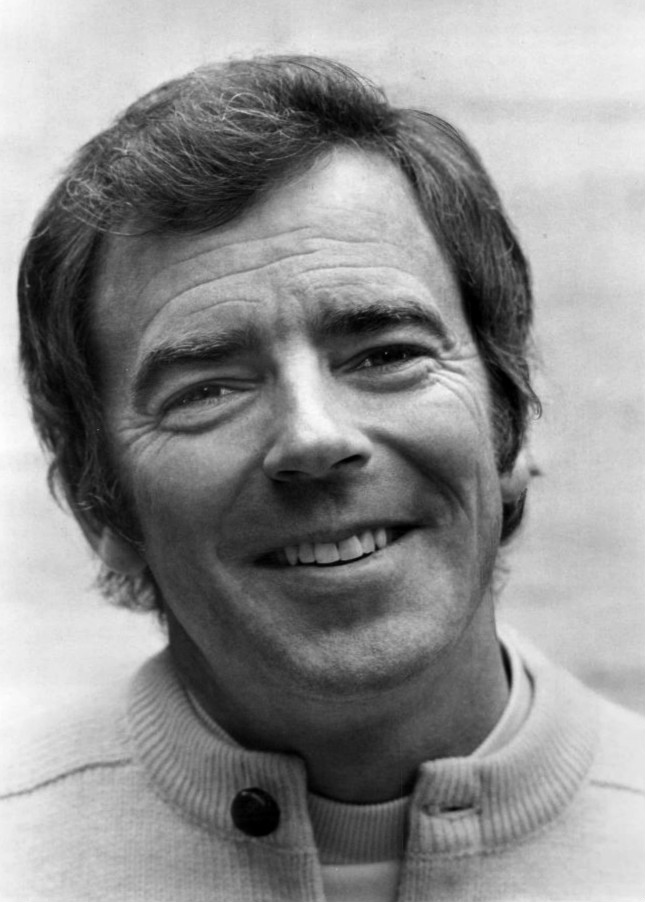
Ken Berry

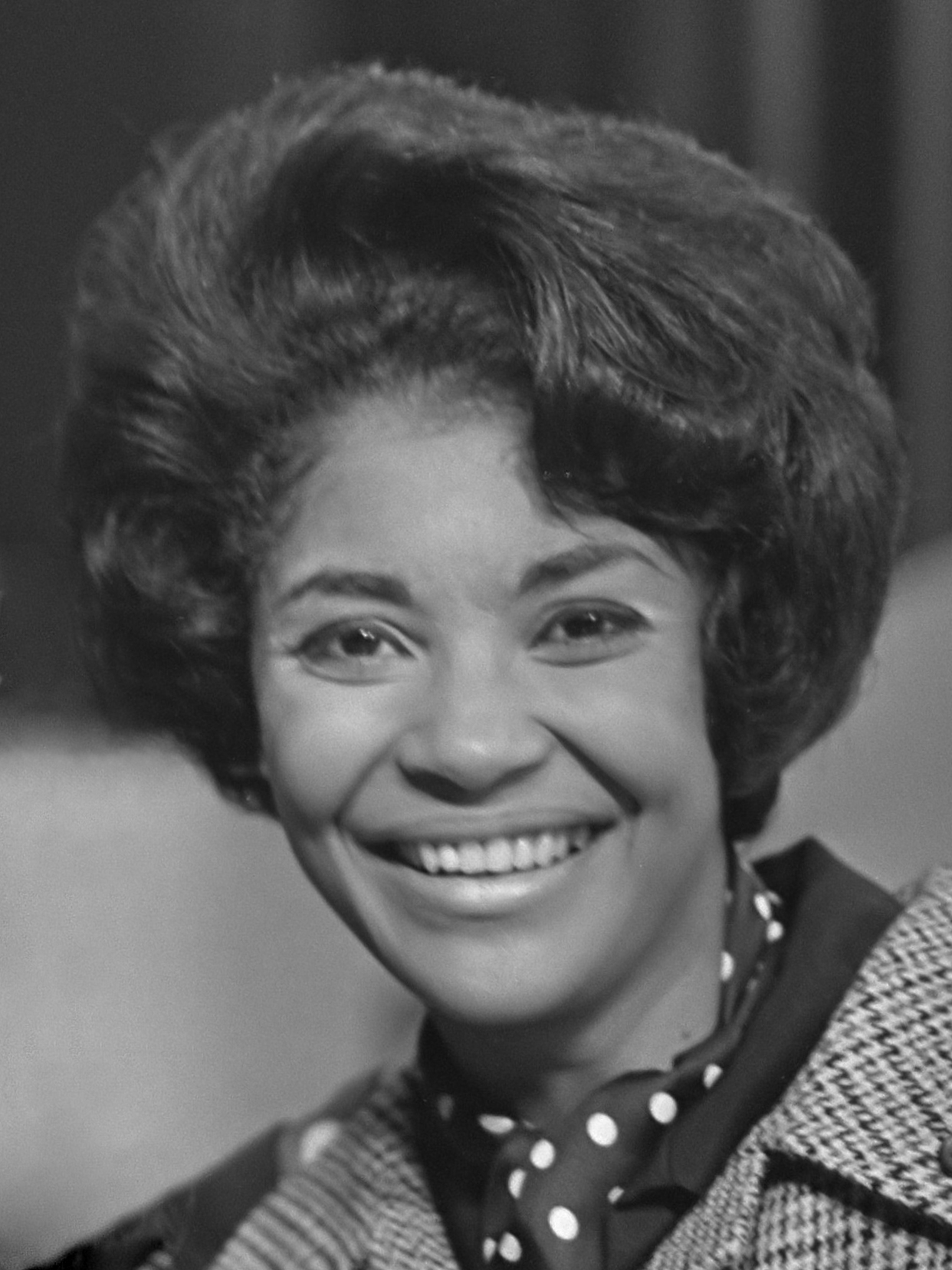
Nancy Wilson

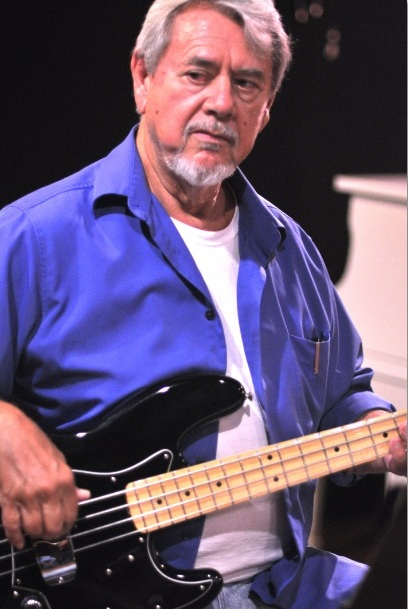
Joe Osborn

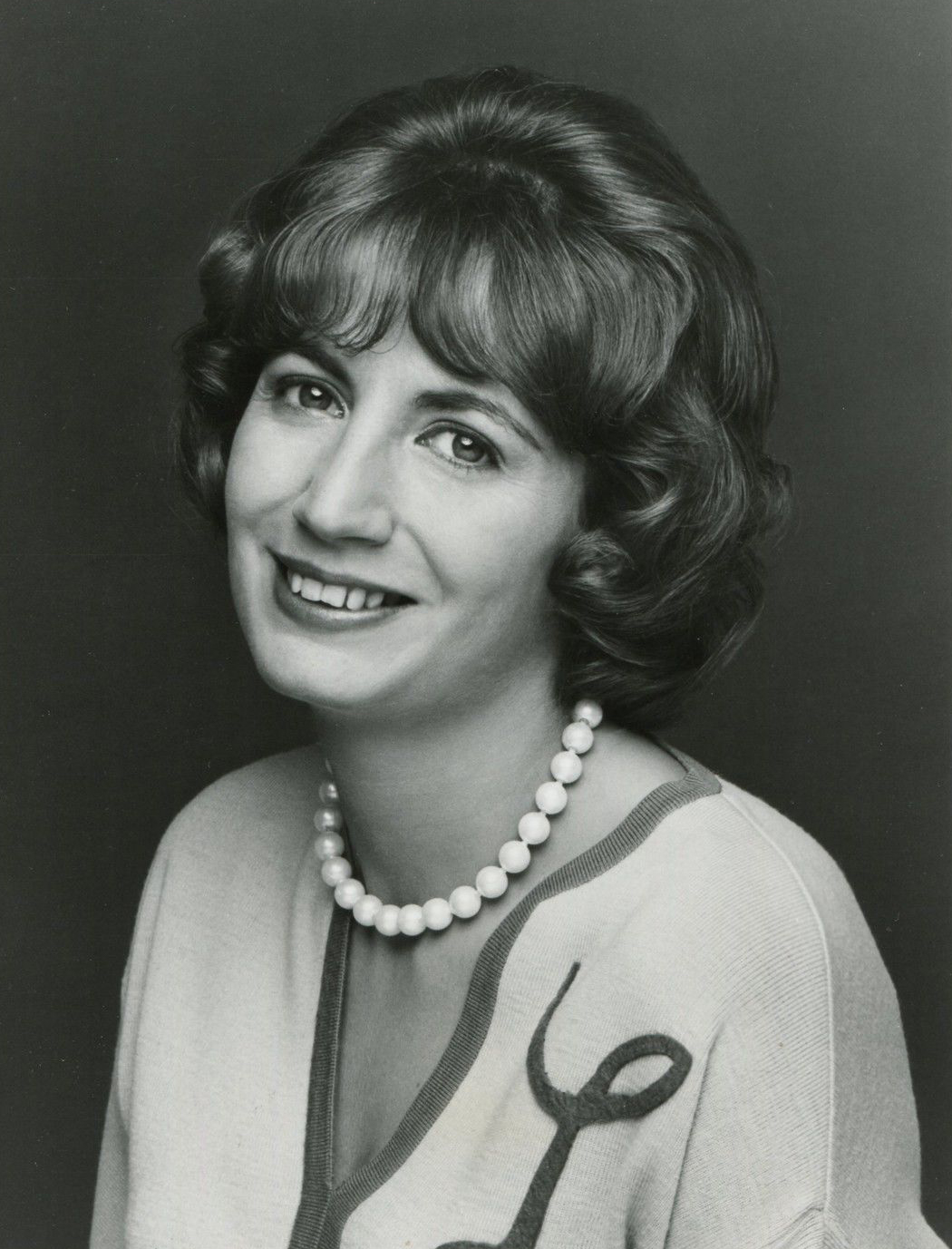
Penny Marshall

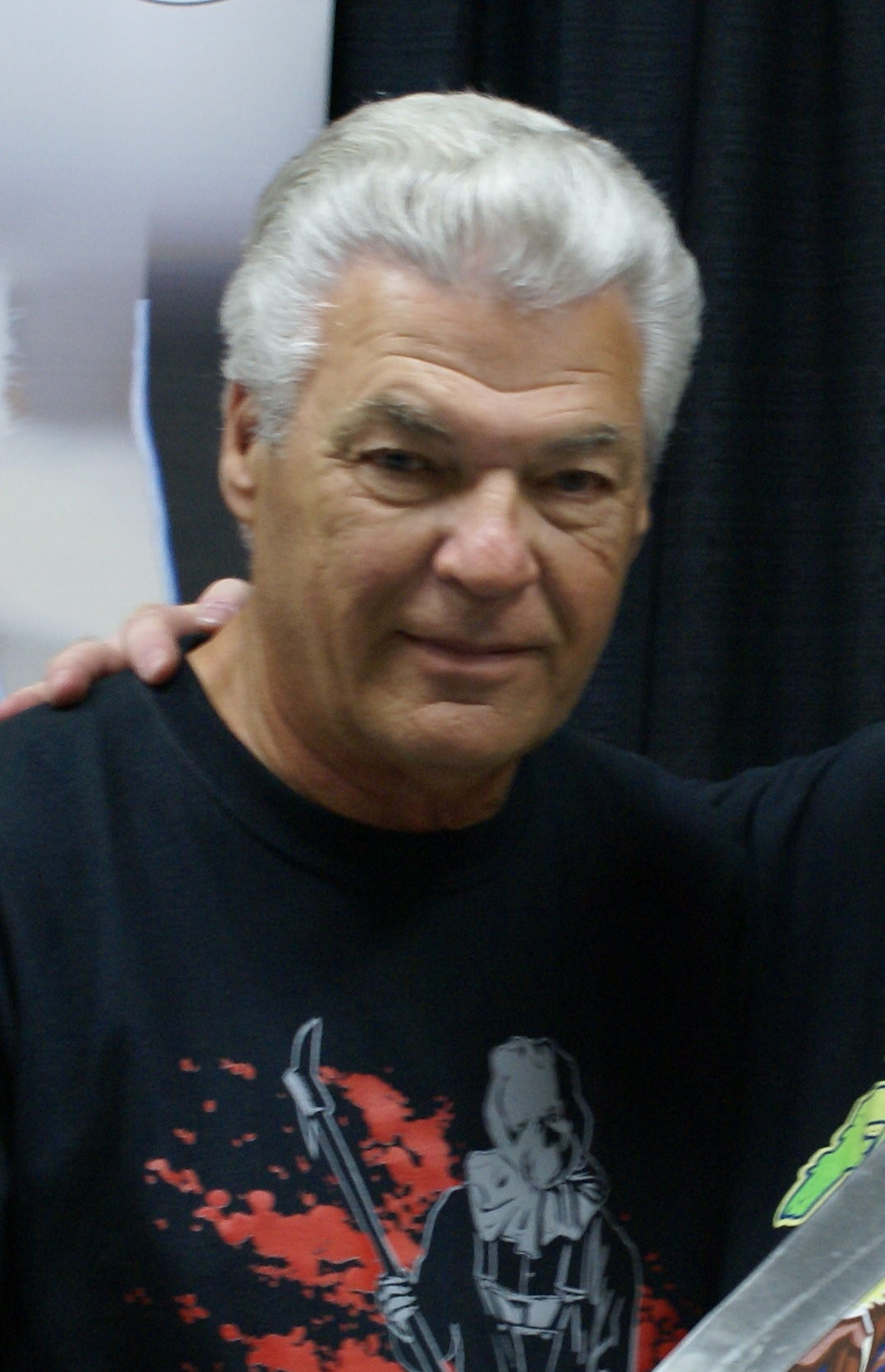
Steve Daskewisz

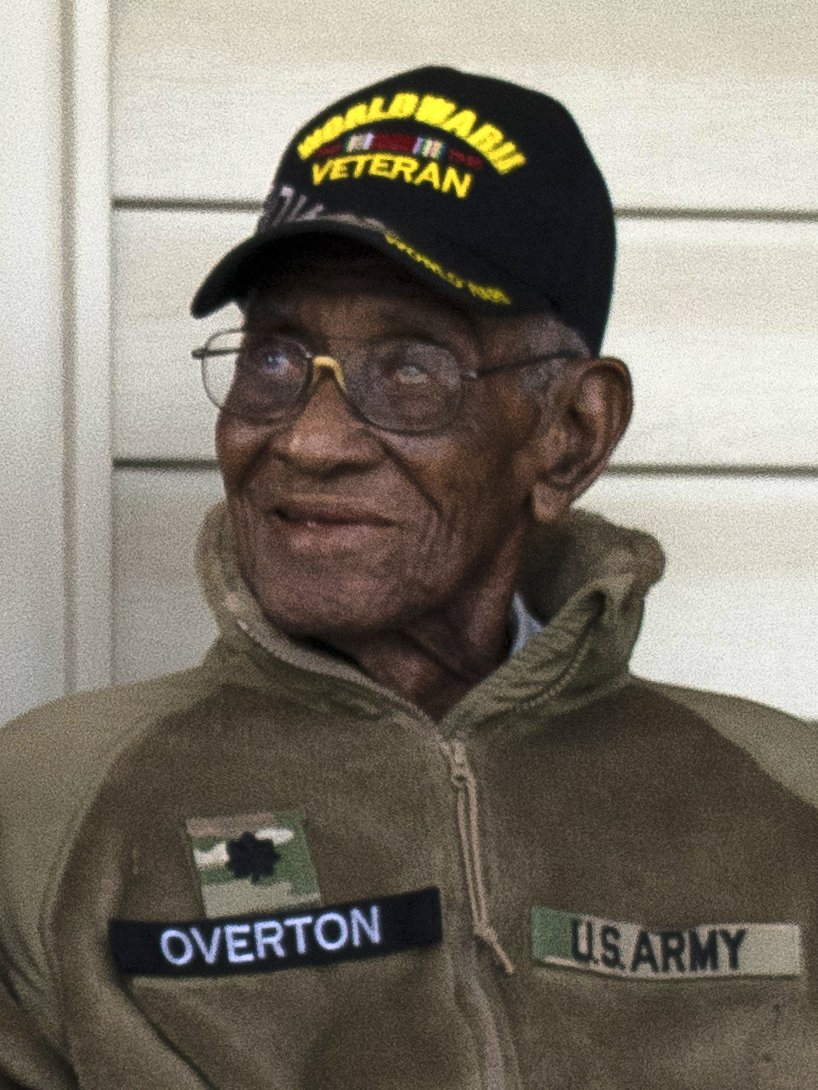
Richard Arvin Overton

- December 1 – Ken Berry, American actor (b. 1933)
- December 2
  - Martin B. Dickman, American biologist (b. 1953)
  - Wilmer Clemont Fields, American Southern Baptist minister and newspaper editor (b. 1922)
  - Al Frazier, American football player (b. 1935)
  - Perry Robinson, American jazz musician (b. 1938)
  - Michael James Snyder, American business executive (b. 1950)
- December 3
  - Philip Bosco, American actor (b. 1930)
  - Fred Greenstein, American political scientist (b. 1930)
  - Mervin E. Muller, American computer scientist and statistician (b. 1928)
  - Alex Wizbicki, American football player (b. 1921)
- December 4
  - Lester Kinsolving, American political radio host (b. 1928)
  - Sam Nover, American sportscaster (b. 1941)
- December 5
  - Jim House, American politician (b. 1948)
  - Jim Jamieson, American professional golfer (b. 1943)
  - Gary McPherson, American college basketball coach (b. 1936)
  - Lynn Schindler, American politician (b. 1944)
  - Harry W. Shlaudeman, American diplomat (b. 1926)
  - Julia Vinograd, American poet (b. 1944)
- December 6
  - Ace Cannon, American saxophonist (b. 1934)
  - Al Gallagher, American baseball player (b. 1945)
  - Larry Hennig, American professional wrestler (b. 1936)
  - Jim Meehan, American poker player (b. 1952)
  - Murray Murphey, American historian (b. 1928)
  - Isiah Robertson, American football player (b. 1949)
  - Frank Joseph Rodimer, American Roman Catholic prelate (b. 1927)
  - Tim Rossovich, American football player (b. 1946)
- December 7
  - Reby Cary, American politician (b. 1920)
  - Paul Henderson, American journalist (b. 1939)
  - The Mascara Snake, American artist and musician (b. 1948)
- December 8
  - Evelyn Berezin, American computer designer (b. 1925)
  - Rosanell Eaton, American civil rights activist (b. 1921)
  - Walter J. Floss Jr., American politician (b. 1923)
  - Rod Jones, American football player (b. 1964)
- December 9
  - Robert Bergland, American politician (b. 1928)
  - William Blum, American author and historian (b. 1933)
  - Riccardo Giacconi, Italian-born American Nobel astrophysicist (b. 1931)
- December 10 – Bob and John, American racehorse (b. 2003)
- December 11
  - Harold L. Kahn, American historian (b. 1930)
  - Eleanor Maccoby, American psychologist (b. 1917)
  - Bill Siegel, American documentary producer and director (b. 1963)
- December 13 – Nancy Wilson, American jazz singer (b. 1937)
- December 14 – Joe Osborn, American bass guitarist (b. 1937)
- December 15 – Jerry Chesnut, American songwriter (b. 1931)
- December 17
  - Penny Marshall, actress, director, and producer (b. 1943)
  - Raven Wilkinson, American dancer (b. 1935)
- December 18
  - Steve Daskewisz, American actor and stuntman (b. 1944)
  - Paul Frazier, American football player (b. 1967)
  - Peter Masterson, American writer (b. 1934)
- December 19- Audrey Geisel second wife of Dr.Seuss and CEO of Dr. Seuss Enterprises ( b. 1921)
- December 20
  - Pascal F. Calogero Jr., American judge (b. 1931)
  - Donald Moffat, English-American actor (b. 1930)
- December 21 – Forrest Fezler, American golfer and golf course designer (b. 1949)
- December 22 – Jimmy Work, American country singer (b. 1924)
- December 23
  - Eileen Battersby, American-born Irish literary critic (b. 1958)
  - Barbara Kloka Hackett, American judge (b. 1928)
  - Liza Redfield, American conductor and pianist (b. 1924)
  - Elias M. Stein, American mathematician (b. 1931)
- December 26 – Morton Sobell, American spy (b. 1917)
- December 27 – Richard Arvin Overton, American war veteran (b. 1906)
- December 30
  - Cameron M. Alexander, 86, American Baptist minister
  - Larry Austin, 88, American composer
  - Seymour S. Cohen, American biochemist (b. 1917)
  - Marc Hauser, American photographer (b. 1952)
  - Jack Kahl, American businessman (b. 1940)
  - Don Lusk, American animator and director (b. 1913)
  - Warren Plunkett, American football player (b. 1920)
- December 31 – Ray Sawyer, Country music singer (b. 1937)

== See also ==
- 2018 in American music
- 2018 in American soccer
- 2018 in American television
- 2018 in United States politics and government
- Timeline of United States history (2010–present)
