= Death and state funeral of George H. W. Bush =

2018 funeral of the 41st U.S. president

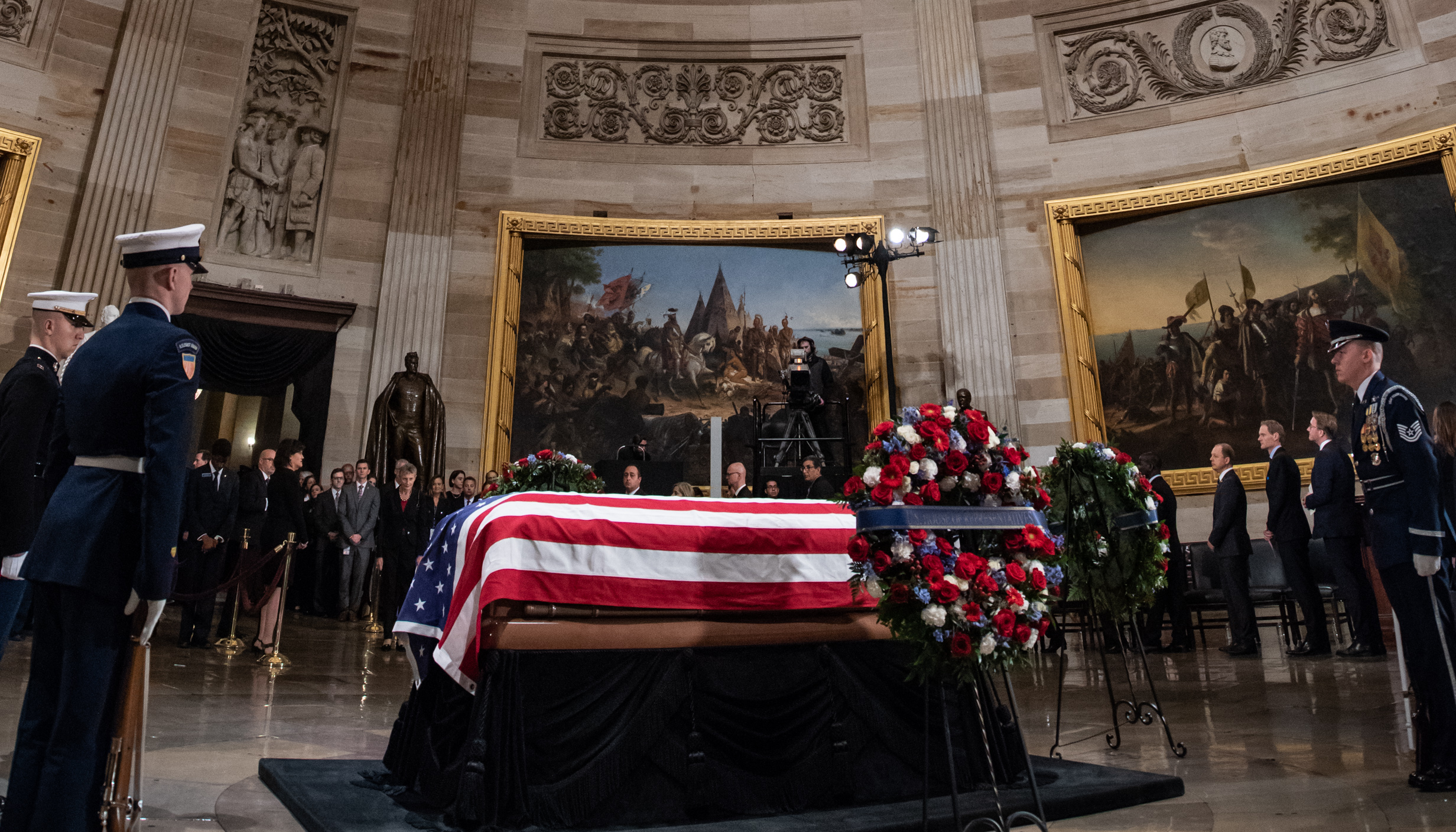
- Bush lies in state in the U.S. Capitol rotunda.
- Date: December 3–6, 2018 (state funeral); December 1–30, 2018 (mourning period)
- Venue: Stage I: Ellington Field; Stage II: Joint Base Andrews; U.S. Capitol; Washington National Cathedral; Stage III: St. Martin's Episcopal Church; Union Pacific Railroad Westfield Auto Facility; Texas A&M University; George H.W. Bush Presidential Library and Museum
- Location: Stage I: Houston, Texas Stage II: Joint Base Andrews, Maryland; Washington, D.C. Stage III: Houston, Texas; Spring, Texas; College Station, Texas
- Type: State funeral
- Organized by: JTF-NCR; U.S. Department of Defense
- Participants: Jimmy Carter; Bill Clinton; George W. Bush; Barack Obama; Donald Trump; Mike Pence; Members of the 115th Congress; Members-elect of the 116th Congress

On November 30, 2018, George H. W. Bush, the 41st president of the United States and the 43rd vice president, died from vascular Parkinson's syndrome at his home in Houston, Texas. At the age of 94 years, 171 days, Bush was the longest-lived president in U.S. history at the time of his death, a record which has since been surpassed by Jimmy Carter's.

Shortly after news broke of Bush's death, President Donald Trump declared a national day of mourning and ordered all flags "throughout the United States and its territories and possessions" lowered to half staff for 30 days after his death. Bush's state funeral was the official funerary rites conducted by the U.S. government, which occurred over a period of four days from December 3 to 6, 2018. About a dozen world leaders attended the event.

== Background ==
Bush experienced a series of health problems in his final years. In 2012, he was diagnosed with vascular Parkinsonism, necessitating the use of a mobility scooter and eventually a wheelchair, limiting his speech and his ability to travel across the world. Due to this, he did not participate at the memorial service of Nelson Mandela in 2013, opting to send a message of condolence to Mandela's family and watch the event on television instead. He was hospitalized numerous times in serious condition, most notably missing the inauguration of Donald Trump due to being in the intensive care unit at Houston Methodist Hospital.

Following the death of his wife Barbara on April 17, 2018, Bush continued to deal with a variety of health issues. He was hospitalized a day after her funeral in critical condition with sepsis, but he was eventually stabilized and released. In May, a month before his 94th birthday, he was briefly admitted to a hospital in Maine due to low blood pressure. Released after about two weeks, he returned to Houston.

In late November, Bush's health began to decline again. He received former president Barack Obama at his home for what was described as a "private visit" on November 27. By November 28, he had stopped eating and did not leave his bed, telling his medical staff he did not want to return to the hospital. James Baker, former Secretary of State and a longtime friend of Bush, reported that Bush's condition had improved by the morning of November 30, as he had begun eating again and was able to sit up from his bed and converse with others. According to Baker, Bush's last meal consisted of three soft-boiled eggs, a cup of yogurt, and two fruit drinks.

By that evening, however, his health again worsened and death was imminent. Irish tenor Ronan Tynan came and sang two songs for Bush, as his family and friends gathered at the household or were placed on speakerphone calls to say their goodbyes. Bush's son, former president George W. Bush, called from his home in Dallas and told his father that he loved him; the elder Bush replied "I love you, too", which were his last words. Shortly after that conversation, Bush died at 10:10 p.m. Central Standard Time. Baker described the death as "peaceful", adding "If those things could be sweet, it was sweet".

Within hours of his death, the former president's office issued a statement indicating that funeral arrangements would be announced "as soon as practical". The exact cause of death was not immediately announced.

== Reactions ==
I do further appoint December 5, 2018, as a national day of mourning throughout the United States. I call on the American people to assemble on that day in their respective places of worship, there to pay homage to the memory of President George H.W. Bush. I invite the people of the world who share our grief to join us in this solemn observance.

— Donald Trump, Proclamation of the President, December 1, 2018

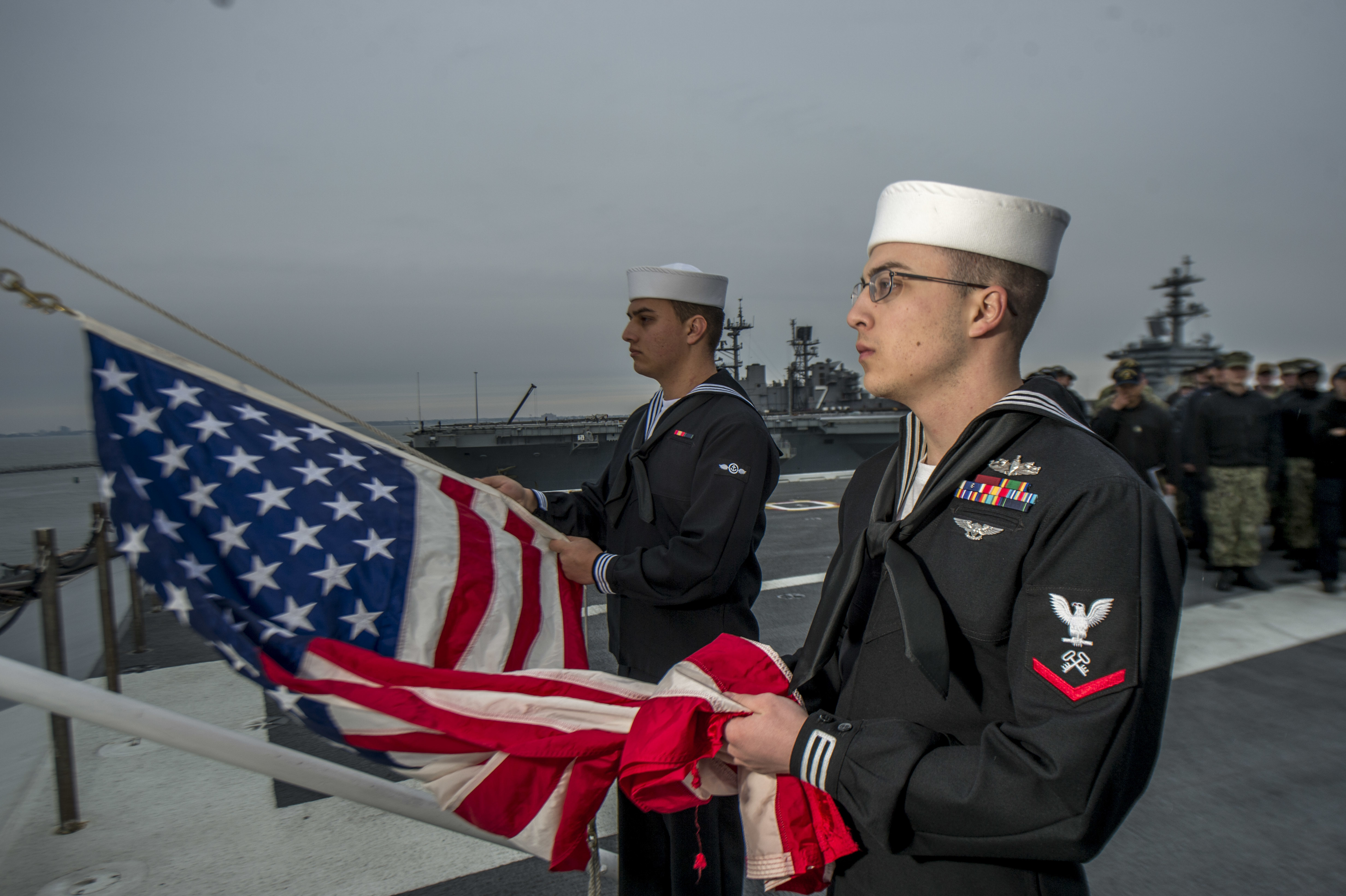
The United States flag is lowered to half mast aboard USS George H.W. Bush on December 1, 2018.

A gun salute is fired at Joint Base Myer–Henderson Hall on December 3, 2018. Memorial gun volleys were fired at 30-minute increments from sunrise to sunset at all U.S. military installations the Monday following Bush's death.

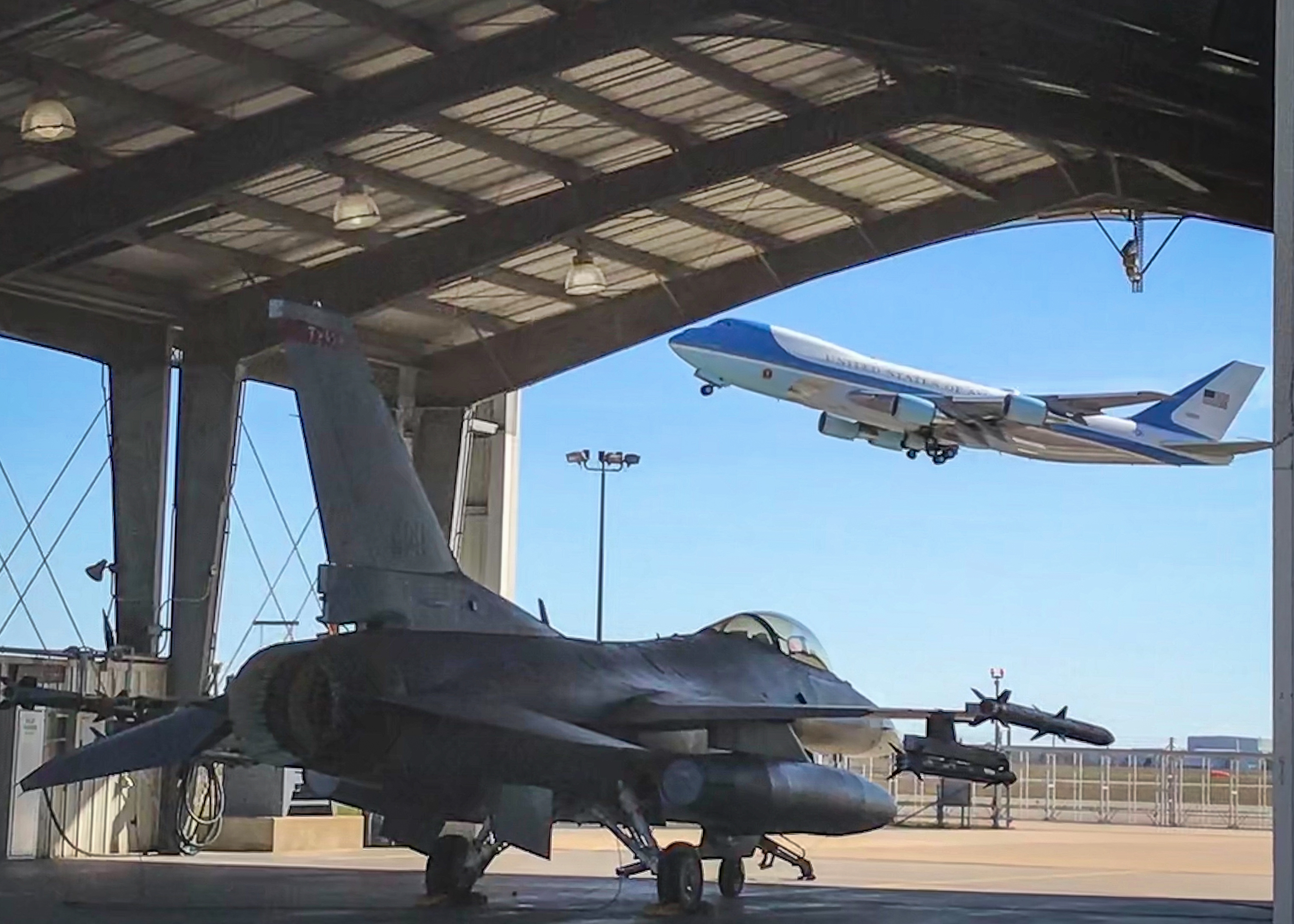
A VC-25 of the 89th Airlift Wing departs Ellington Field, Texas on December 3, 2018, carrying the remains of George Bush to Washington for the state funeral

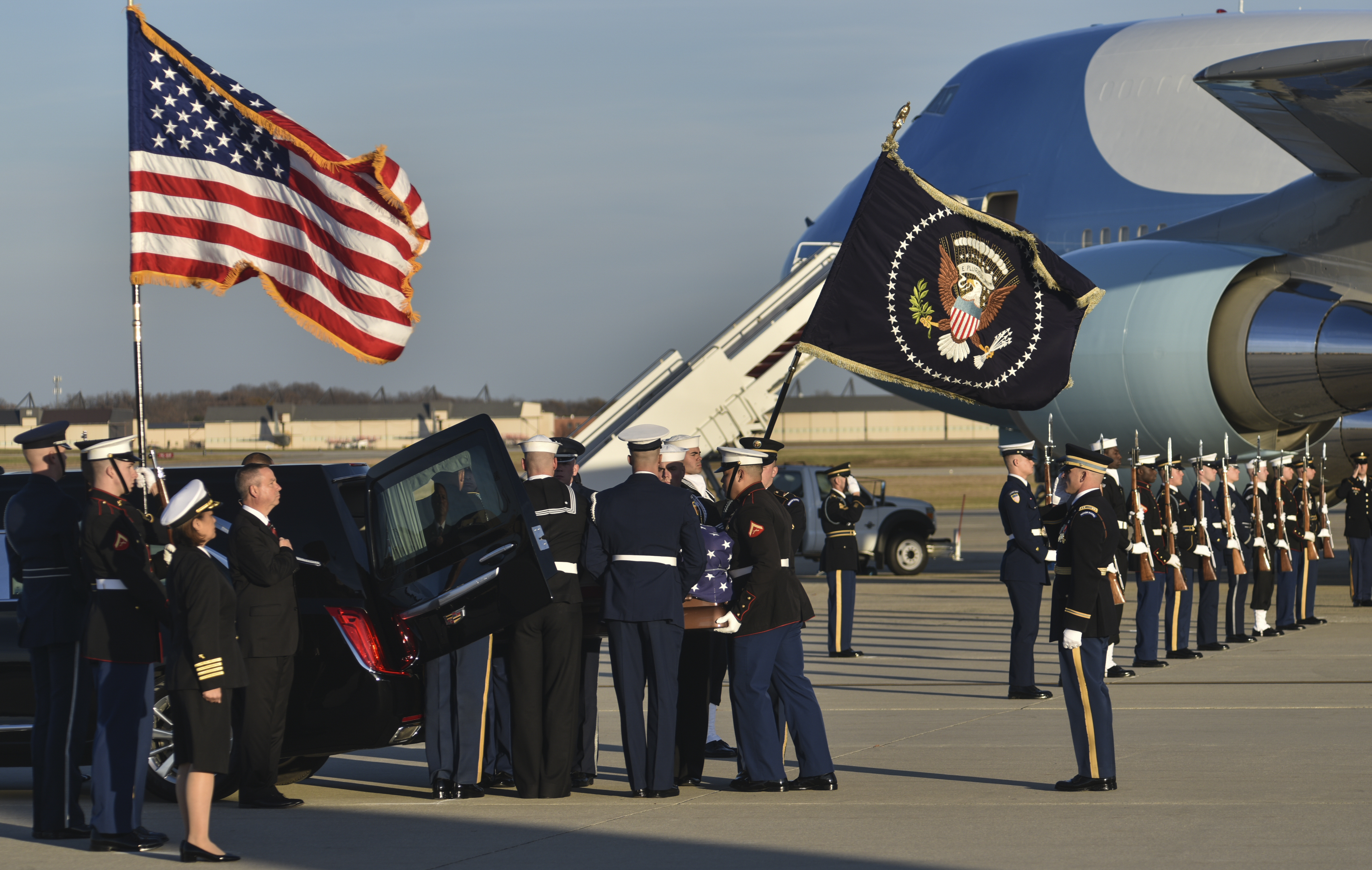
The casket carrying George Bush's remains arrives at Joint Base Andrews on December 3, 2018

The color party, honorary pallbearers, and pallbearers with the casket carrying the remains of George Bush enter the United States Capitol on December 3, 2018.

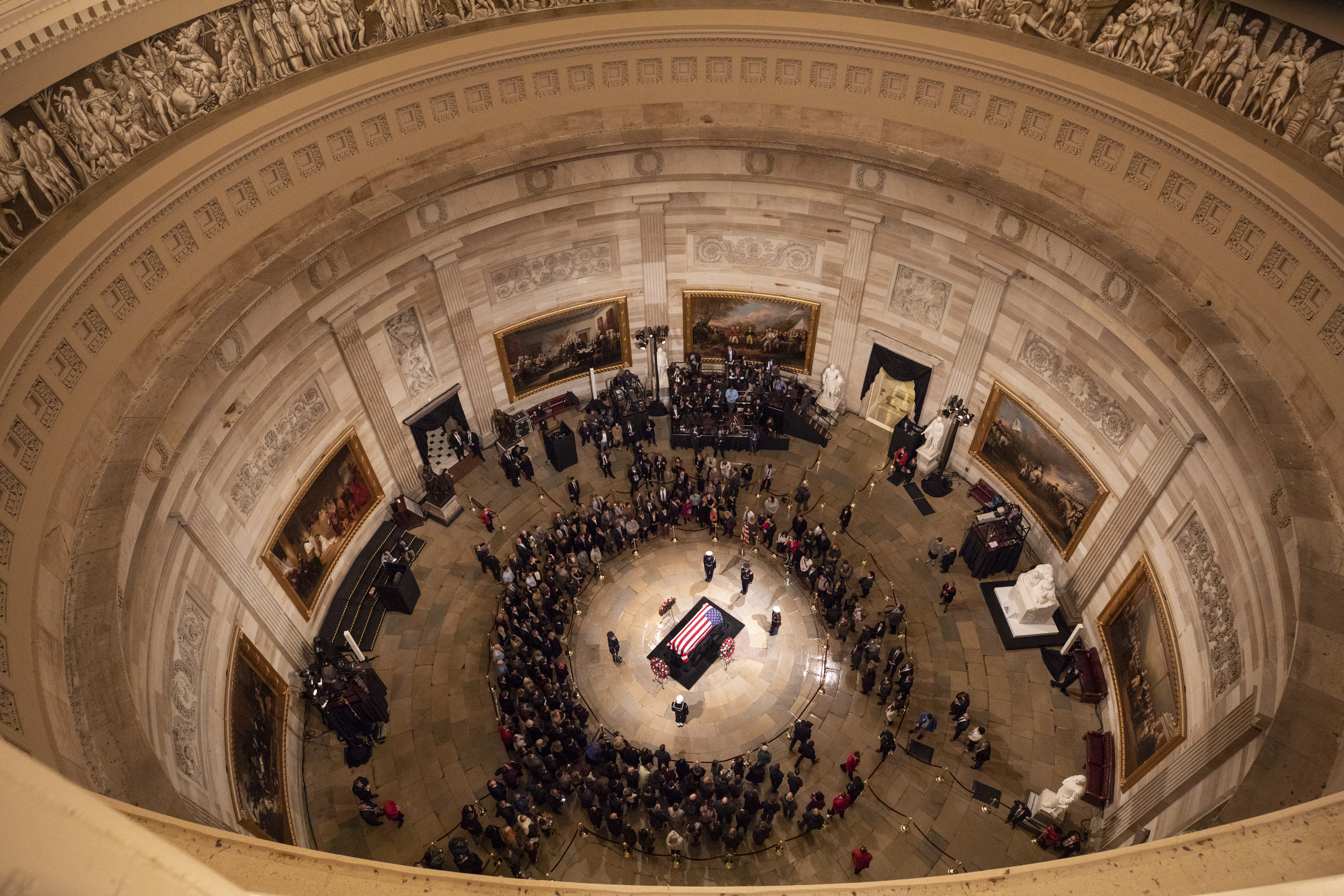
Members of the public pay their respects Monday evening, December 3, 2018, at the casket of former President George Bush lying in state in the Rotunda of the U.S. Capitol.

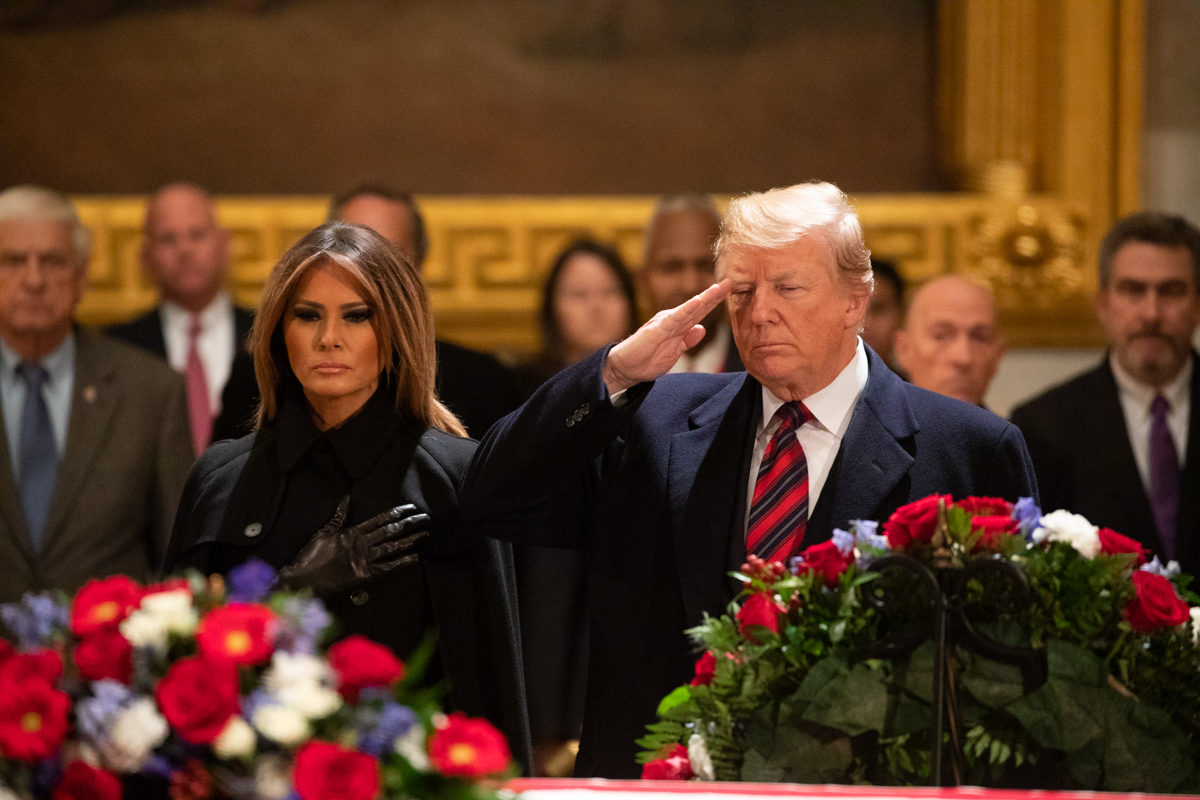
President Donald Trump salutes the casket containing the remains of George Bush as First Lady Melania Trump looks on during the lying in state on December 3, 2018.

"Praise, My Soul, the King of Heaven" is performed during the memorial service at the National Cathedral on December 5, 2018.

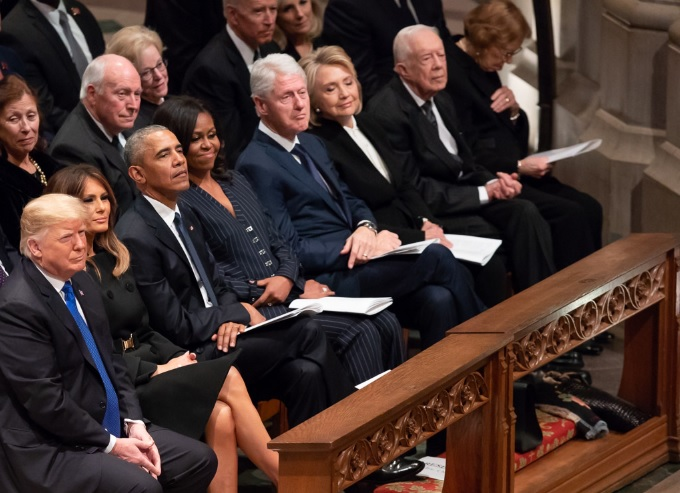
President Trump and former presidents Obama, Clinton, and Carter along with their respective wives pictured during the memorial service at the National Cathedral on December 5, 2018

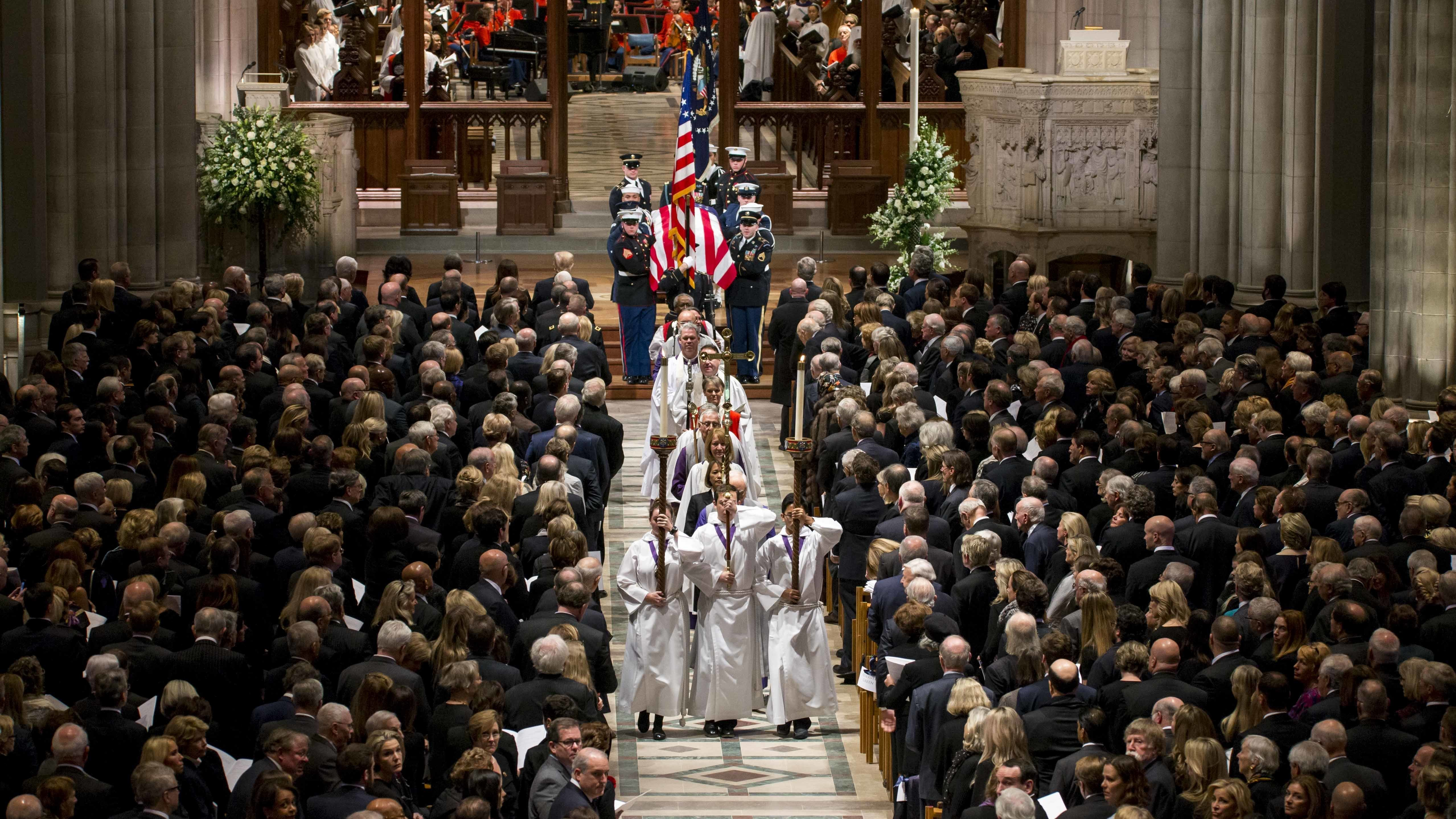
The casket containing the remains of George Bush is removed from the National Cathedral following the memorial service on December 5, 2018.

Aircraft of Strike Fighter Wing Atlantic arrive for the flyover during interment of Bush's remains at the George Bush Library.

At 12:49 a.m. EST on December 1, President Donald Trump tweeted that his and Melania Trump's "hearts ache with his loss and we, with the entire American people, send our prayers to the entire Bush family". Former president Barack Obama said that "George H. W. Bush's life is a testament to the notion that public service is a noble, joyous calling. And he did tremendous good along the journey." Former president Bill Clinton sent a statement that "Hillary and I mourn the passing of President George H.W. Bush, and give thanks for his great long life of service, love, and friendship. I will be forever grateful for the friendship we formed. From the moment I met him as a young governor invited to his home in Kennebunkport, I was struck by the kindness he showed to Chelsea, by his innate genuine decency, and by his devotion to Barbara, his children, and their growing brood." Former president Jimmy Carter also mourned his death, saying his administration was "marked by grace, civility, and social conscience." Former vice president Dan Quayle, who served with Bush, said that "the world mourns the loss of a great American" and that he had often told his children to look to Bush as a role model. Former vice president Al Gore issued a statement calling Bush a "man of integrity". Sylvester Turner, the mayor of Houston – where Bush resided at the time of his death – said that he joined "Houstonians in mourning the death of George Herbert Walker Bush and expressing heartfelt condolences to his children and the rest of the Bush family".

== Initial activities ==
=== Gun salutes and memorial musters ===
U.S. Army Regulation 600–25 provides that United States Army posts are to fire continuous artillery volleys at 30-minute intervals from sunrise to sunset the day after official notice is received of the death of a former president of the United States. As also provided for by regulation, the corps of cadets of the United States Military Academy are to be immediately assembled to be officially informed of the death by the superintendent.

=== National mourning ===
At mid-morning on December 1, President Donald Trump proclaimed December 5 to be a national day of mourning. The proclamation further decreed that American flags "on all public buildings and grounds, at all military posts and naval stations, and on all naval vessels of the Federal Government in the District of Columbia and throughout the United States and its Territories and possessions" be lowered to half staff until December 30, 2018. In addition, all agencies of the United States Government throughout the United States were ordered closed on the day of mourning and the Supreme Court of the United States announced it would postpone hearing oral arguments in Gamble v. United States which had been previously scheduled for that day.

The United States Postal Service suspended regular mail deliveries, retail services and administrative office activity on December 5 as part of the national day of mourning although there was limited package delivery to avoid any setbacks for the Holiday season. All of the United States' principal financial exchanges – including the New York Stock Exchange and NASDAQ – suspended trading for the duration of the day of mourning.

=== Foreign observances ===
The Government of the United Kingdom issued instructions that all government offices in the United Kingdom were to lower the Union Flag to half-mast on December 1, 2018. In Canada, flags on all federal buildings were ordered flown at half-staff on December 5.

On December 1 the Kuwait Towers displayed images of Bush in honor of his vital role in the Gulf War.

The President of the Republic of Kosovo Hashim Thaçi announced on December 5 the day of national mourning with the flags half-masted.

=== Informal observances ===
Two hours following the death of Bush, approximately 100 students at Texas A&M University gathered at the George H.W. Bush Presidential Library and Museum and proceeded to a nearby statue of Bush to pay respects. Later that day, on an overlook near the Bush Compound in Maine, people spontaneously gathered to lay flowers, among them including former University of Massachusetts president Jack M. Wilson. A makeshift memorial of flowers, flags, and cards was also created by members of the public outside the gates of Bush's Houston home.

The Dole Institute of Politics at the University of Kansas announced on December 1 that it would immediately lay out a book of condolence for members of the public to sign. Also on December 1, the city of Houston announced it would hold a memorial service in honor of Bush on the evening of December 3, 2018, at Hermann Square in front of the Houston City Hall with the Houston Symphony scheduled to provide music.

Moments of silence were observed at sporting events in the weeks following George Bush's death, including prior to the December 3 NFL game between the Washington Redskins and Philadelphia Eagles at Lincoln Financial Field, and before the December 9 Army–Navy Game, among others.

== State funeral ==
=== Planning ===
Prior to his death, Bush filed a 211-page document with the Military District of Washington, which contains a request for an aerial flyover of fighter jets in missing man formation by the United States Air Force during his state funeral as well as final interment and burial to occur at the George H.W. Bush Presidential Library and Museum in College Station, Texas. Bush also indicated that he did not want the presidential fanfare, "Hail to the Chief", to be performed during final interment and burial. In addition, Bush made plans for a national funeral service to be held at Washington National Cathedral in Washington D.C.

=== Security measures ===
The Department of Homeland Security designated the Washington phase of the state funeral as a National Special Security Event, as they have done with the state funerals of Ronald Reagan and Gerald Ford, as with other major Washington events since September 11, 2001.

=== Ceremony ===
The state funeral, as announced, occurred in three stages.

Air transport of Bush's remains occurred aboard a VC-25, tail number 29000, of the United States Air Force's 89th Airlift Wing operating under the call sign "Special Air Mission 41" (SAM41).

==== Stage One (Houston, Texas) ====
On the morning of December 3, 2018, the casket carrying Bush's remains was moved from Geo. H. Lewis & Sons Funeral Home in Houston to a waiting hearse which then proceeded along a specially closed stretch of Interstate 610 to Ellington Field Joint Reserve Base. The hearse was escorted by Houston Police Department motorcycle outriders and arrived on the runway by approximately 11:45 a.m. Central Standard Time.

A brief ceremony was held on the apron for 100 invited guests, among them George P. Bush, prior to the casket's placement on the waiting "Special Air Mission 41" VC-25 which completed take off by 12:10 p.m. Former president George W. Bush accompanied the casket aboard the aircraft, and was joined by the late president Bush's service dog Sully.

==== Stage Two (Washington, D.C.) ====
At approximately 3:25 p.m. Eastern Standard Time on December 3, Special Air Mission 41 arrived at Joint Base Andrews. The casket containing Bush's remains was removed from the aircraft as the United States Air Force Band performed "My Country, 'Tis of Thee" and a 21 gun salute was executed by the U.S. Army's Presidential Salute Battery. The casket proceeded through a ramp guard composed of U.S. armed forces personnel into a waiting Cadillac XTS Echelon hearse for transfer to the United States Capitol.

Bush lay in state in the United States Capitol rotunda from the evening of December 3 through the morning of December 5.

On December 5, at approximately 10:00 a.m. EST, the casket was transferred from the Capitol rotunda for funeral services at Washington National Cathedral. The officiating clergy included Michael Bruce Curry, Mariann Edgar Budde, Randolph Marshall Hollerith, and Dr. Russell Levenson Jr. Rosemarie Logan Duncan was the master of ceremonies. Lauren Bush, Ashley Walker Bush, and Jenna Bush Hager were readers. Jan Naylor Cope provided the Intercession. Tributes were made by Jon Meacham, Brian Mulroney, Alan K. Simpson, and George W. Bush. President Donald Trump attended, but the Bush family didn't ask him to speak, making this the first state funeral in which there was no tribute from the sitting president since that of Lyndon B. Johnson in 1973.

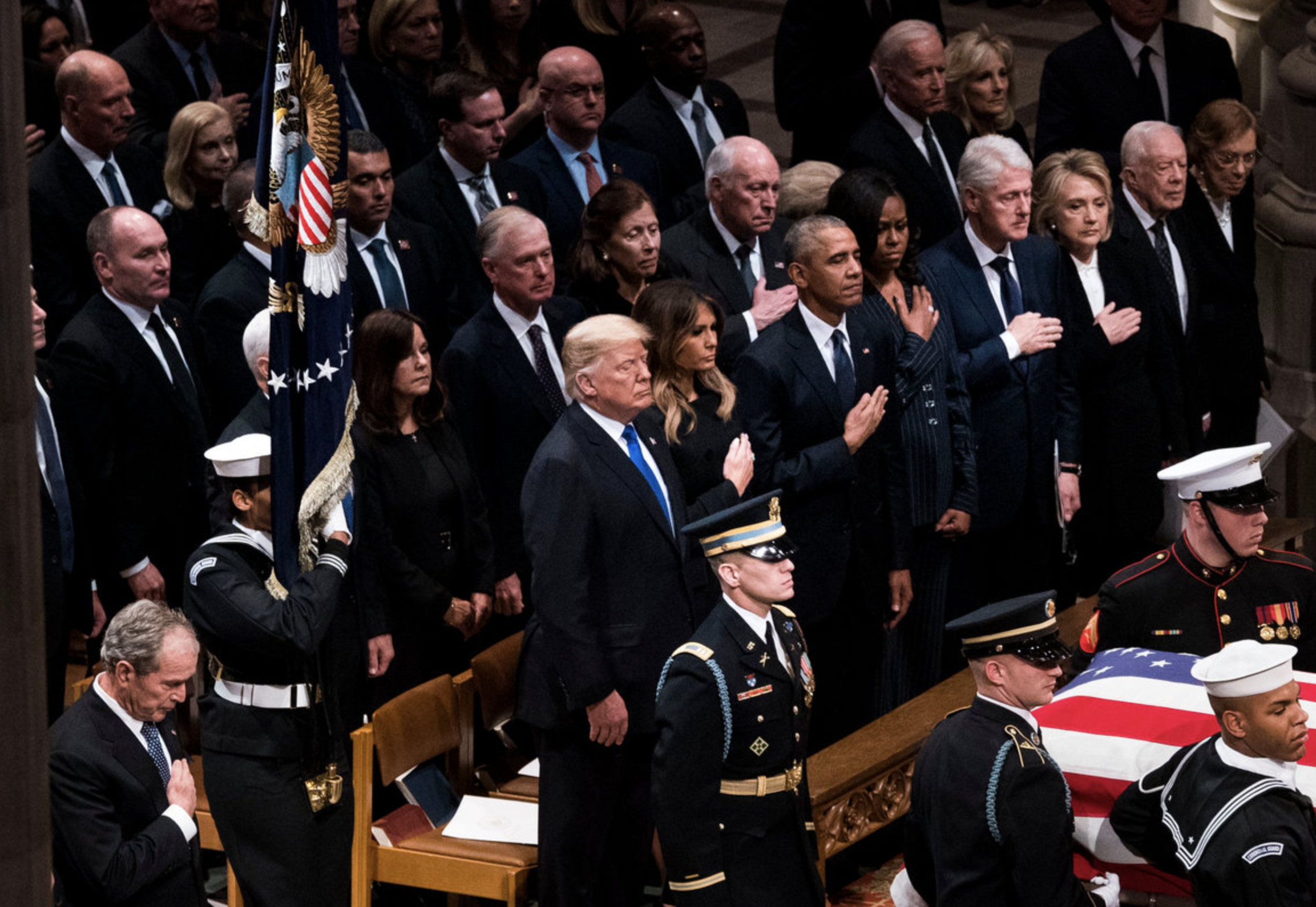
Six living presidents in one image (counting future president Joe Biden)

First Lady Melania Trump, former presidents Jimmy Carter, Bill Clinton, George W. Bush (Bush's eldest son), and Barack Obama were also all in attendance, along with their respective wives, former first ladies Rosalynn Carter, Hillary Clinton, Laura Bush (Bush's daughter-in-law), and Michelle Obama. Also attending were Vice President Mike Pence and Second Lady Karen Pence, former vice presidents Dan Quayle, Al Gore, Dick Cheney, and Joe Biden (as Walter Mondale was absent), along with former second ladies Marilyn Quayle, Lynne Cheney, and Jill Biden (as Tipper Gore was absent). Presidential children in attendance included Lynda Bird Johnson Robb with Chuck Robb, Luci Baines Johnson with Ian Turpin, Tricia Nixon Cox with Edward F. Cox, Susan Ford, Chelsea Clinton, former Florida governor Jeb Bush (Bush's younger son), and Ivanka Trump with Jared Kushner.

Then-senator Bill Nelson, New York Governor Andrew Cuomo, political adviser to George W. Bush Karl Rove, former Homeland Security Secretary Tom Ridge, Democratic Representatives John Lewis from Georgia and Jim Cooper from Tennessee, Republican Representatives John Culberson from Texas, who represented Bush's old House district, and Mark Meadows from North Carolina along with many other lawmakers attended as well. Former Secretaries of States such as Henry Kissinger, Madeleine Albright, Colin Powell, Condoleezza Rice, and John Kerry as well as Prince Charles, Chancellor of Germany Angela Merkel, Supreme Court Justice Ruth Bader Ginsburg, and Peyton Manning also attended.

Musical tributes were provided by the Armed Forces Chorus, the United States Marine Orchestra, United States Coast Guard Band, Michael W. Smith and Ronan Tynan, who sang at Bush's bedside before his death. The coffin was lifted, turned, and borne out of the cathedral to Ralph Vaughan Williams's 1906 hymn For All the Saints, Who From Their Labor Rest (Sine nomine) as five U.S. presidents stood in respect.

After the service, the Washington Ringing Society rang a half-muffled quarter peal of Grandsire Caters to Bush's memory. The hearse carrying Bush arrived at Joint Base Andrews at approximately 2:01 p.m. EST and at 2:09 p.m. EST transferred aboard VC25A 29000 via scissor truck as the Bush family boarded Special Air Mission 41 and took off after 2:26 p.m. EST.

==== Stage Three (Houston, Texas; Spring, Texas; College Station, Texas) ====
Bush's remains arrived at Ellington Field at December 5, 4:30 p.m. Central Standard Time where they were greeted by a military escort, transported to St. Martin's Episcopal Church and laid in repose until the following morning. A second funeral service for family and friends was held at 10:00 a.m. Central Standard Time on December 6. Eulogies were delivered by President Bush's friend, former Secretary of State and White House Chief of Staff James Baker and grandson George P. Bush. Clergy participating in the service included church Rector Dr. Russell Levenson Jr., Bishop of Texas C. Andrew Doyle, and former Bishop of Texas Claude E. Payne. During the service, The Oak Ridge Boys sang "Amazing Grace" and Reba McEntire sang "The Lord's Prayer."

After the church service, the remains were driven by hearse to the Union Pacific Railroad Westfield Auto Facility and transported by special railway funeral car to the George H.W. Bush Presidential Library and Museum for interment. The funeral train was led by Union Pacific 4141, an EMD SD70ACe locomotive painted to honor Bush as the first time the remains of any US president had ever traveled on a funeral train since Dwight Eisenhower in 1969. A guard of honor formed by the Ross Volunteers, the Governor of Texas' military escort, attended the removal of the casket from the funeral train. As the casket was removed, the Fightin' Texas Aggie Band played "Hail to the Chief" followed by the Aggie War Hymn.

During interment, the United States Navy announced it would perform the largest funeral flyover in its history, with what the Navy described as an "unprecedented" 21 F/A-18 Hornets led by Captain Kevin McLaughlin, the commanding officer of Strike Fighter Wing Atlantic whose own aircraft was painted in a special memorial livery. The flyover was known as the "missing man flyover," and featured 21 aircraft in a unique position as an honor to Bush's Navy pilot service during World War II. The interment ceremony was private; it was not filmed, broadcast on television, or streamed online at the advance request of the Bush family. Only the flyover, as well as the 21-gun salute and the performance of "Taps" that happened at the library grounds, were shown instead. Bush's remains were buried on the early morning of December 6 between the graves of his wife Barbara and their daughter Robin.

Throughout the day, all U.S. military posts equipped with artillery fired 21-gun salutes. Meanwhile, the Salute to the Union – 50 successive rounds of artillery fire – was performed by batteries at Fort Sill, Oklahoma, Fort Stewart, Georgia, and Fort Drum, New York, at 5:00 p.m., a custom traditionally marking the final interment of a former president.

=== Pallbearers and honorary pallbearers ===
As customary, pallbearers during each movement of the casket containing Bush's remains were drawn from personnel of the United States Army, United States Navy, United States Air Force, United States Marine Corps, and United States Coast Guard. In addition, honorary pallbearers were selected for most movements of the casket.

==== Stage 1 honorary pallbearers ====
Special agents of Bush's former United States Secret Service protective detail served as honorary pallbearers during the movement of the casket from the funeral home in Houston to the hearse that would transport it to Ellington Field.

==== Stage 2 honorary pallbearers ====
Sailors drawn from the crew of the United States aircraft carrier USS George H.W. Bush served as honorary pallbearers for the removal of the casket from Special Air Mission 41 at Joint Base Andrews. A further thirteen honorary pallbearers were selected for the transport of the casket from the hearse to the rotunda of the U.S. Capitol, all of whom were former ship or strike group commanders of USS George H.W. Bush, including: Admiral John Aquilino, Vice Admiral DeWolfe Miller, Vice Admiral Frank Pandolfe, Vice Admiral Nora Tyson, Rear Admiral Kenneth Whitesell, Rear Admiral David Thomas Jr., Rear Admiral Andrew Loiselle, Rear Admiral Stephen Evans, Rear Admiral William Pennington, Rear Admiral Brian Luther, Rear Admiral Gregory Nosal, Captain Sean Bailey, and Captain Kevin O'Flaherty. Captain Sean R. Bailey, the ship's commanding officer at the time of Bush's death, was unable to serve as an honorary pallbearer as the vessel was making final preparations for deployment.

==== Stage 3 honorary pallbearers ====
Honorary pallbearers serving during the movement of the casket at points during Stage 3 included Charles F. Hermann (Scowcroft Chair in International Policy Studies at the Bush School of Government and Public Service), Amy Sharp (president of the Texas A&M University Student Government Association), and former Texas A&M football coach R. C. Slocum.

== Gallery ==
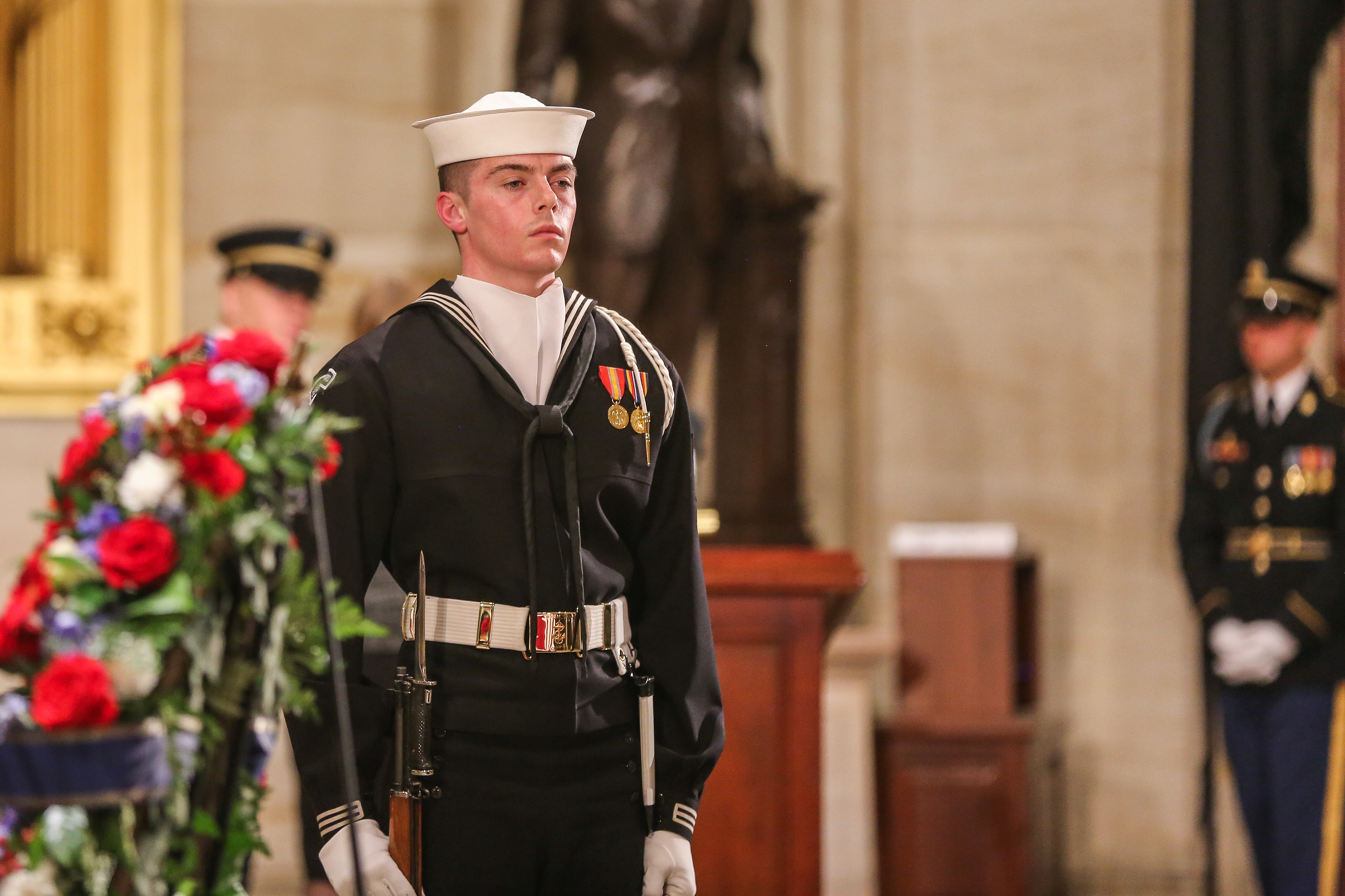
A sailor of the U.S. Navy Ceremonial Honor Guard is pictured during the lying in state on December 3, 2018.

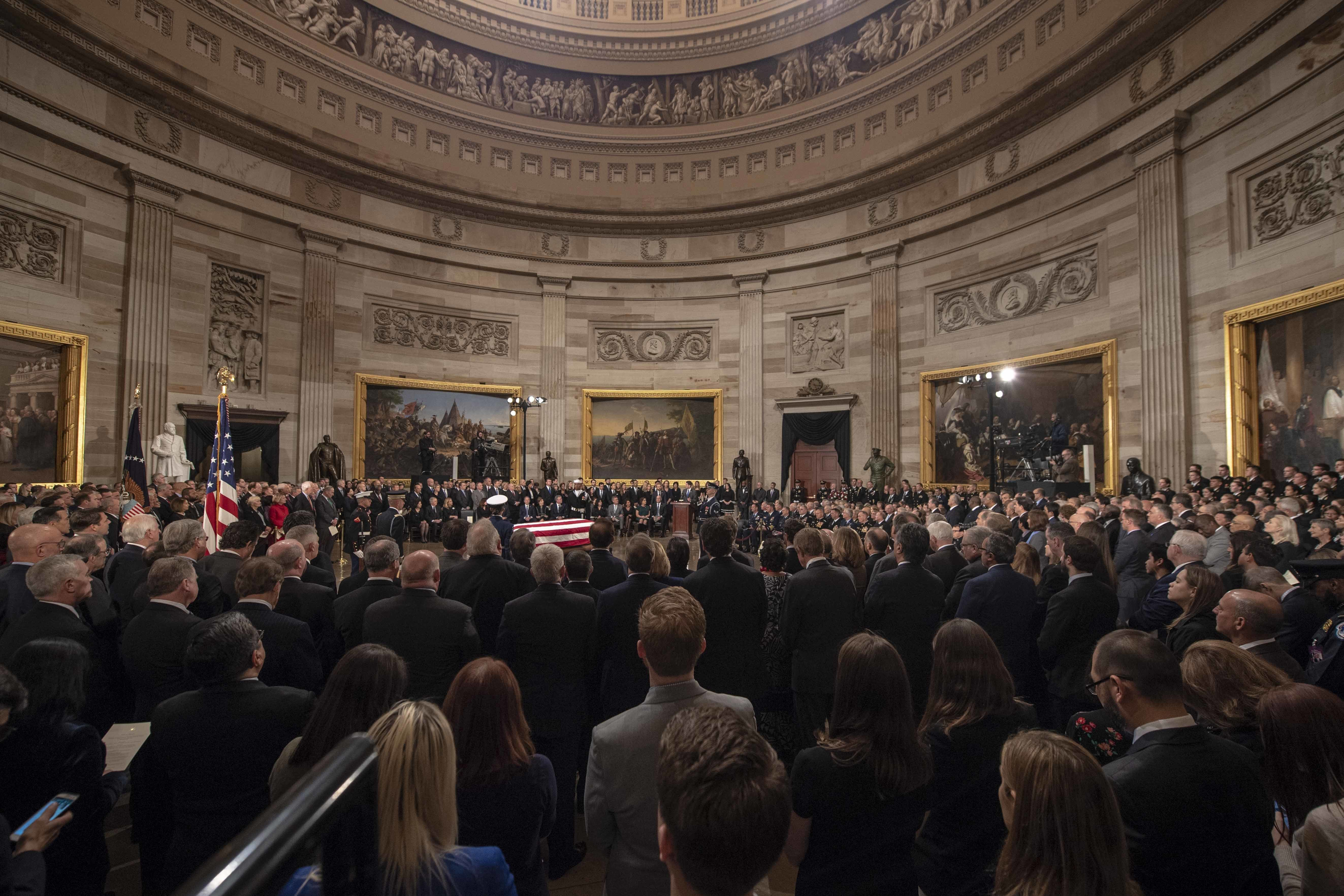
Mourners circumambulate the casket of George Bush during the lying in state on December 3, 2018.

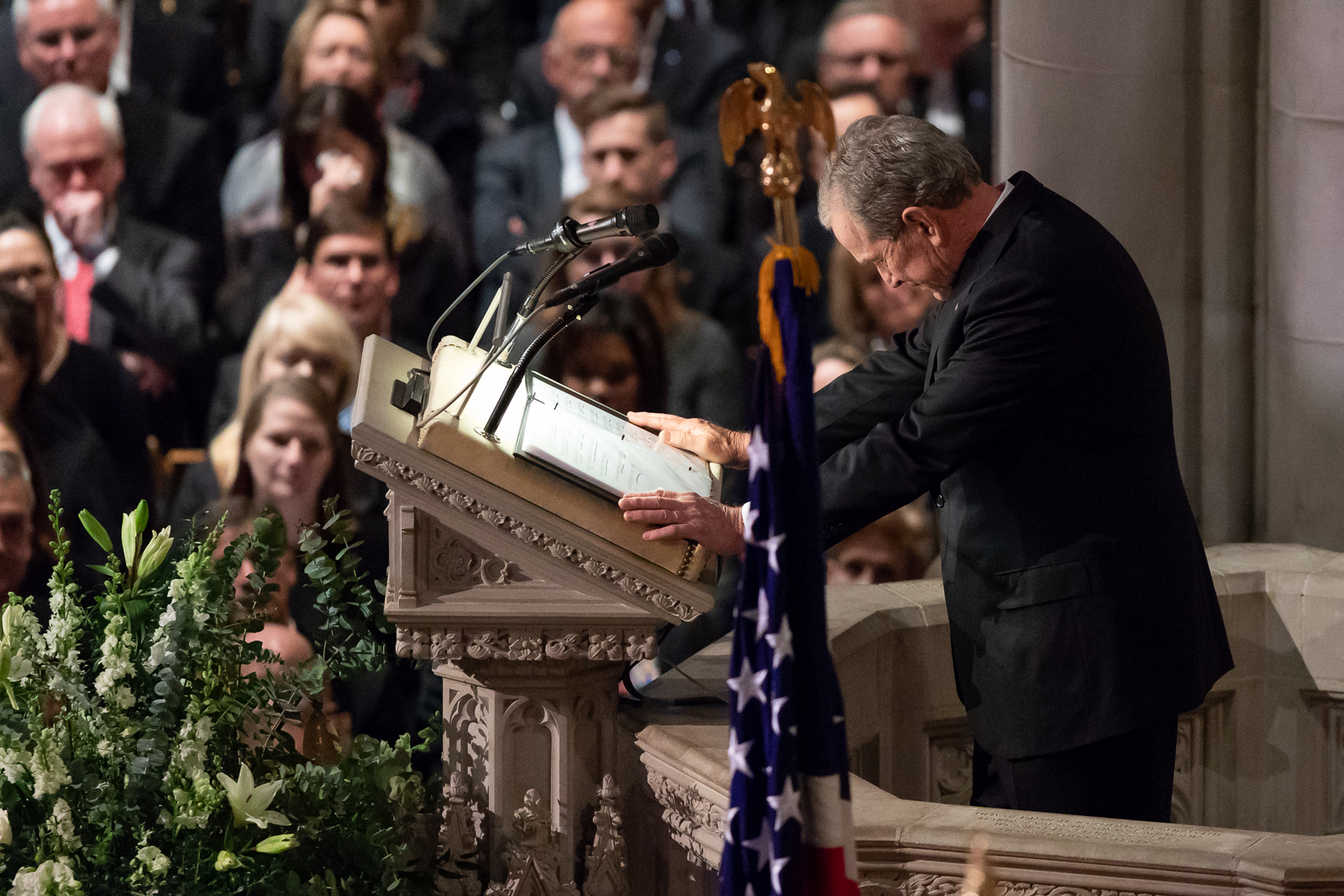
George W. Bush tearfully eulogizes his father at the National Cathedral on December 5, 2018.

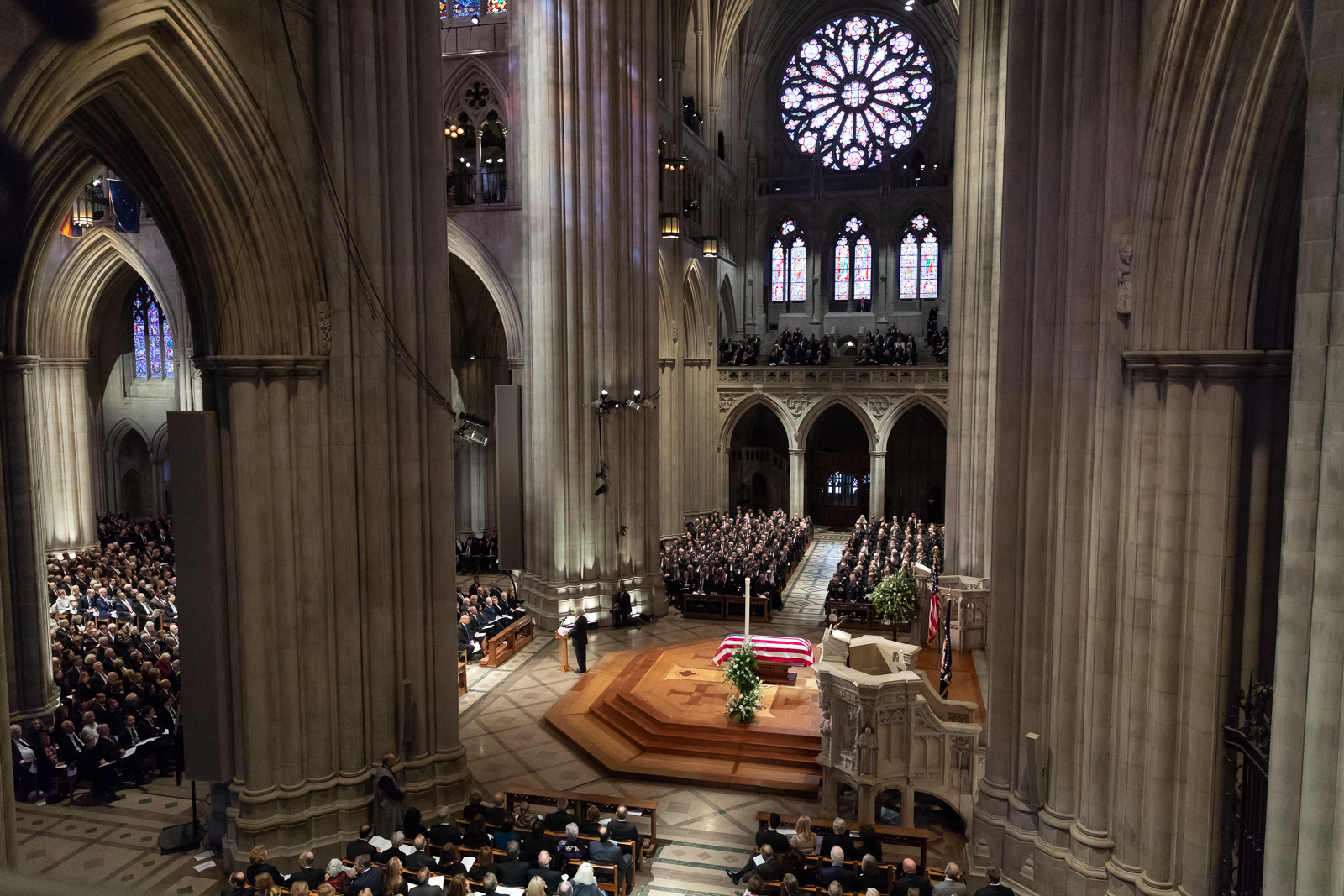
The casket in the National Cathedral on December 5, 2018

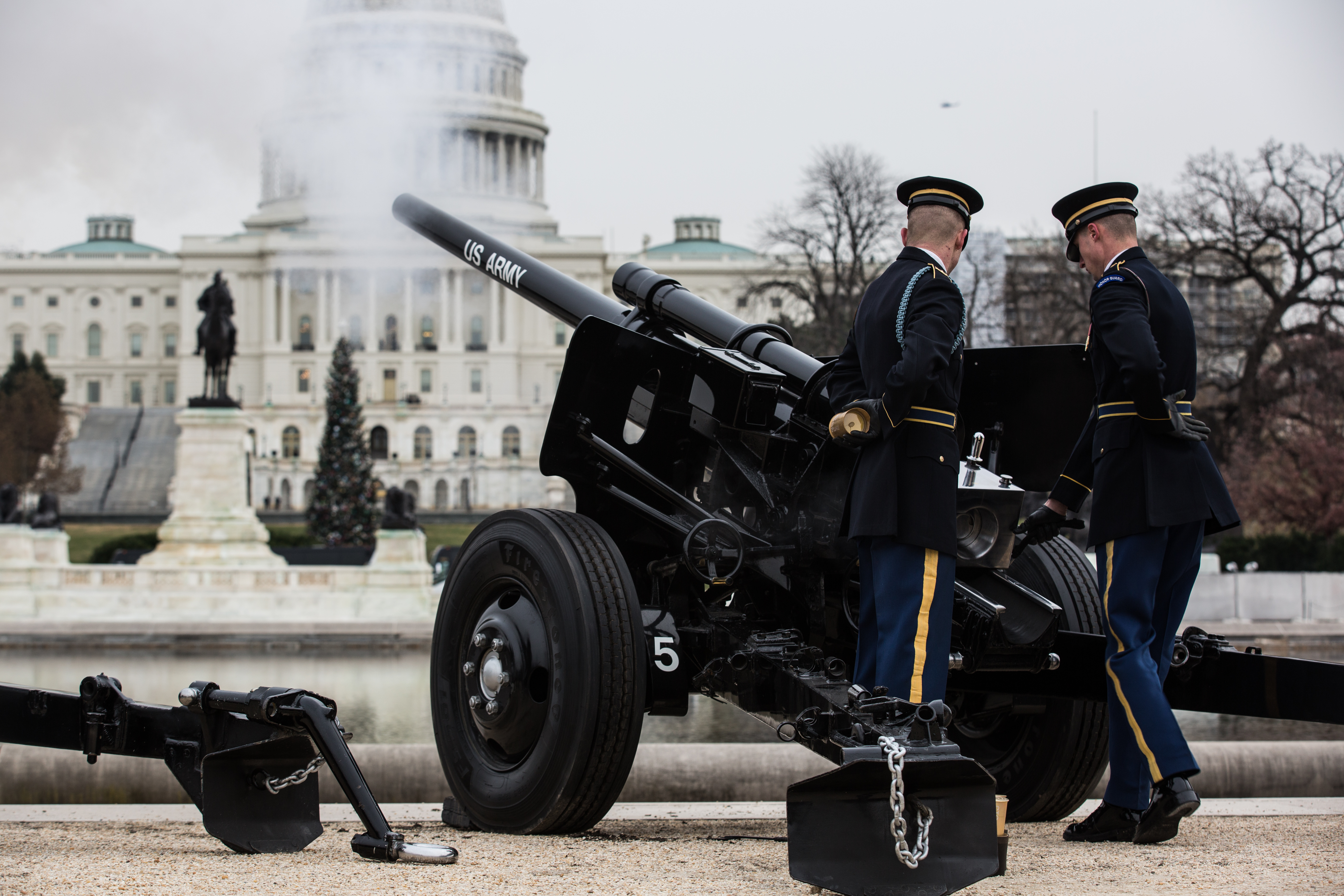
The Presidential Salute Battery fires a 21 gun salute on December 5, 2018.

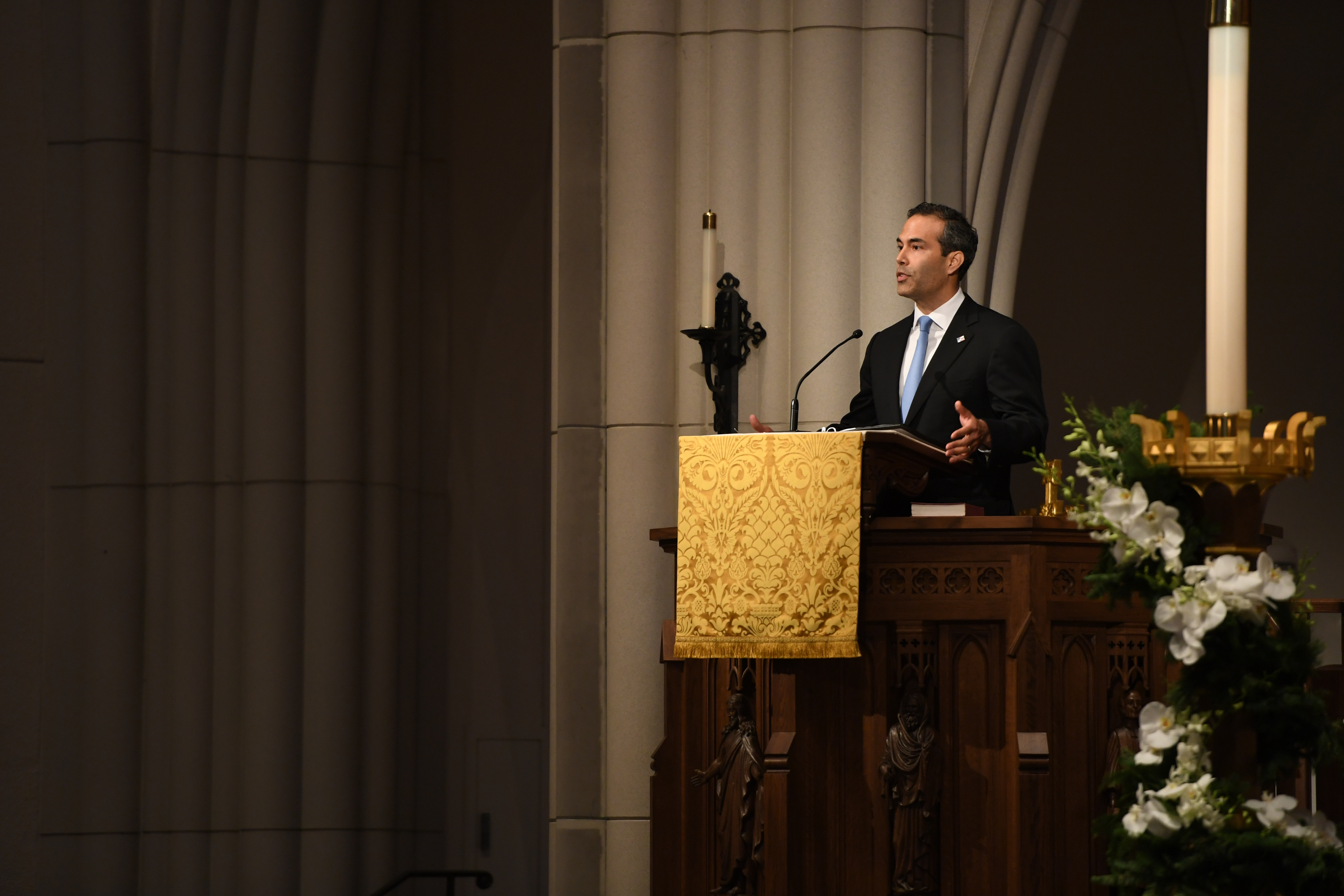
Grandson George P. Bush speaks during the church service in Houston on December 6, 2018.

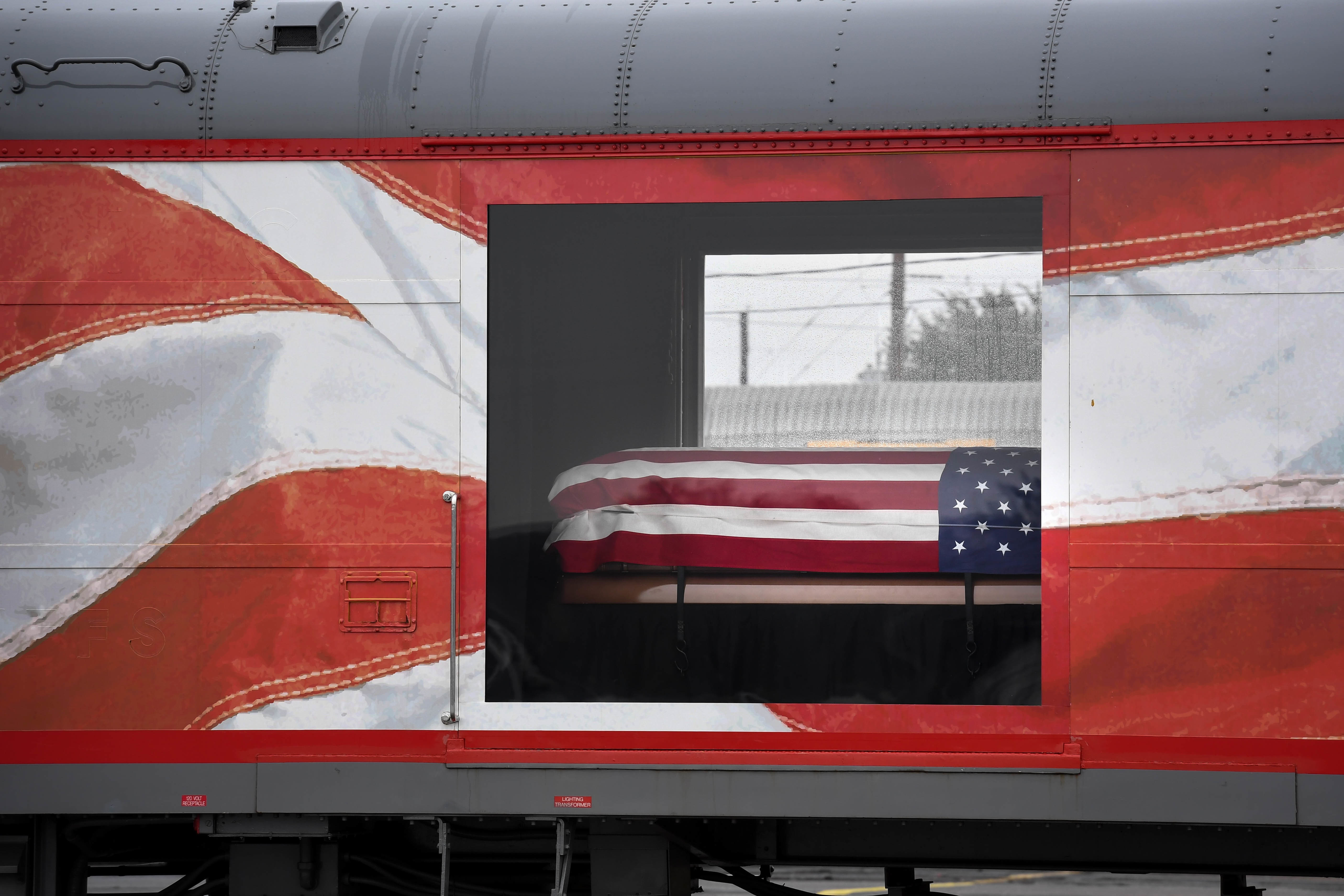
The remains of President Bush were transported by a specially painted Union Pacific funeral train from Spring, Texas to College Station, Texas on December 6, 2018.

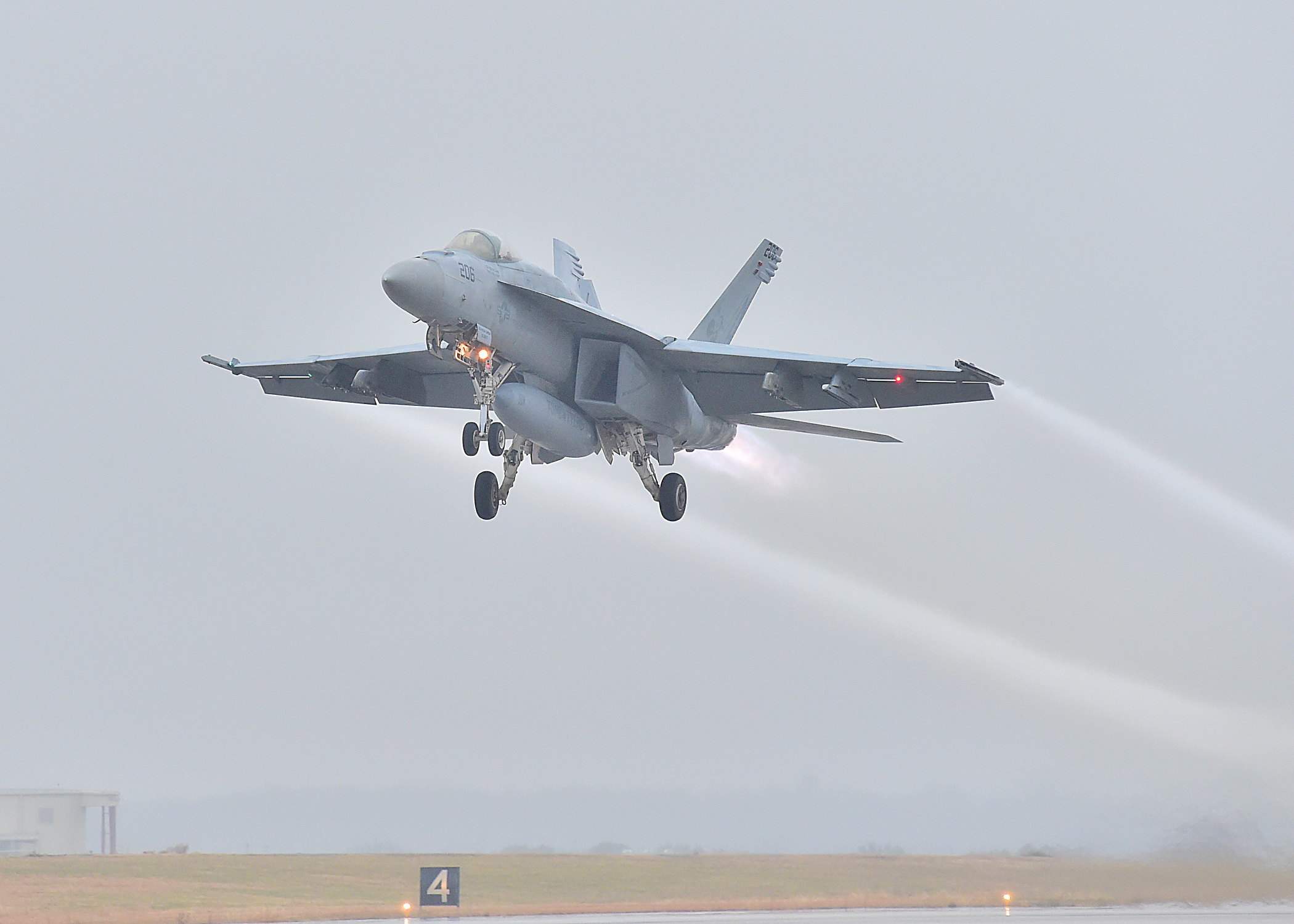
A Strike Fighter Wing Atlantic F/A-18 takes off from Naval Air Station Fort Worth Joint Reserve Base for the memorial flyover on December 6, 2018.

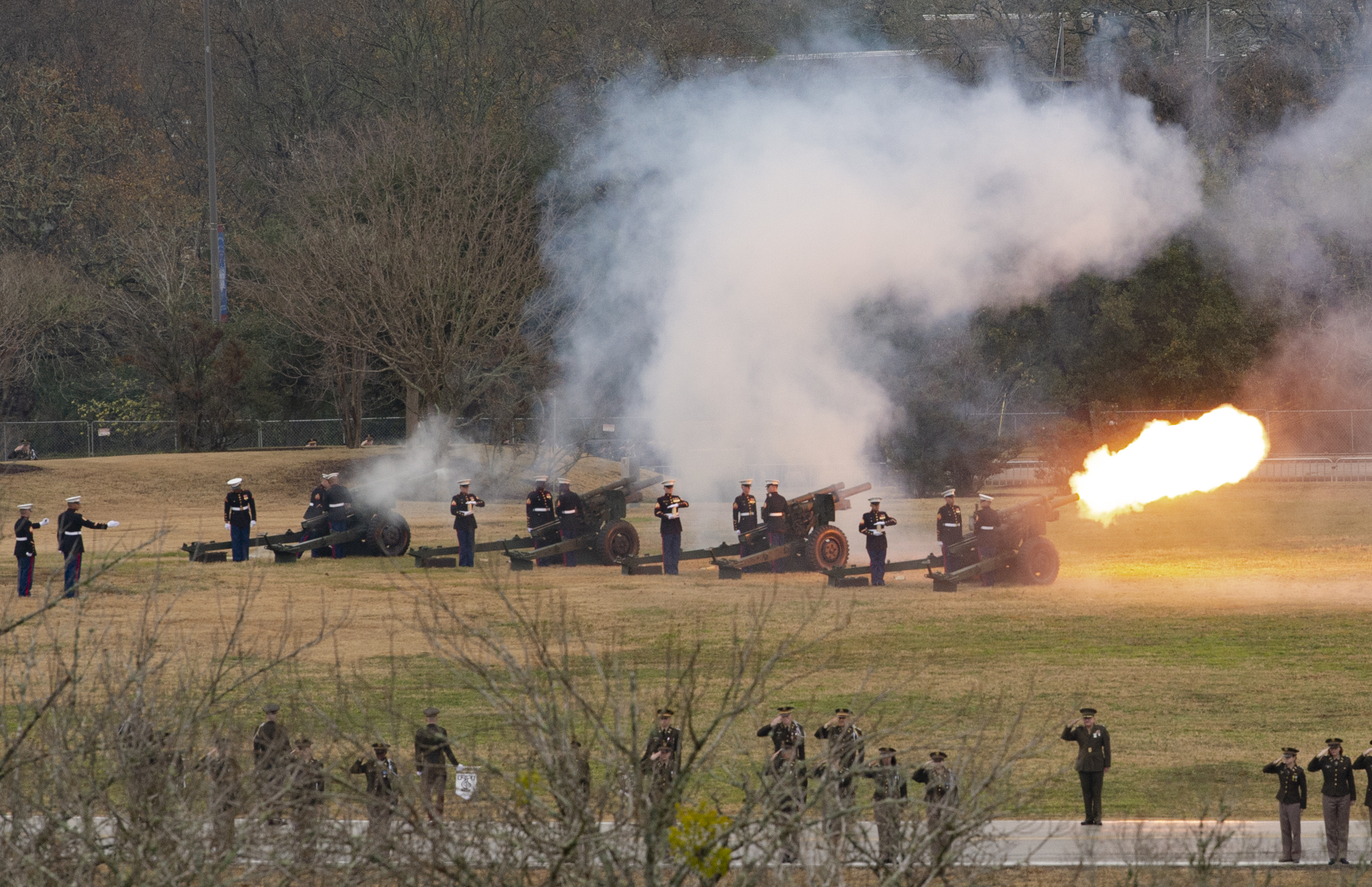
A U.S. Marine Corps artillery battery at the George Bush Presidential Library Center at Texas A&M University fires a 21 gun salute on December 6, 2018.

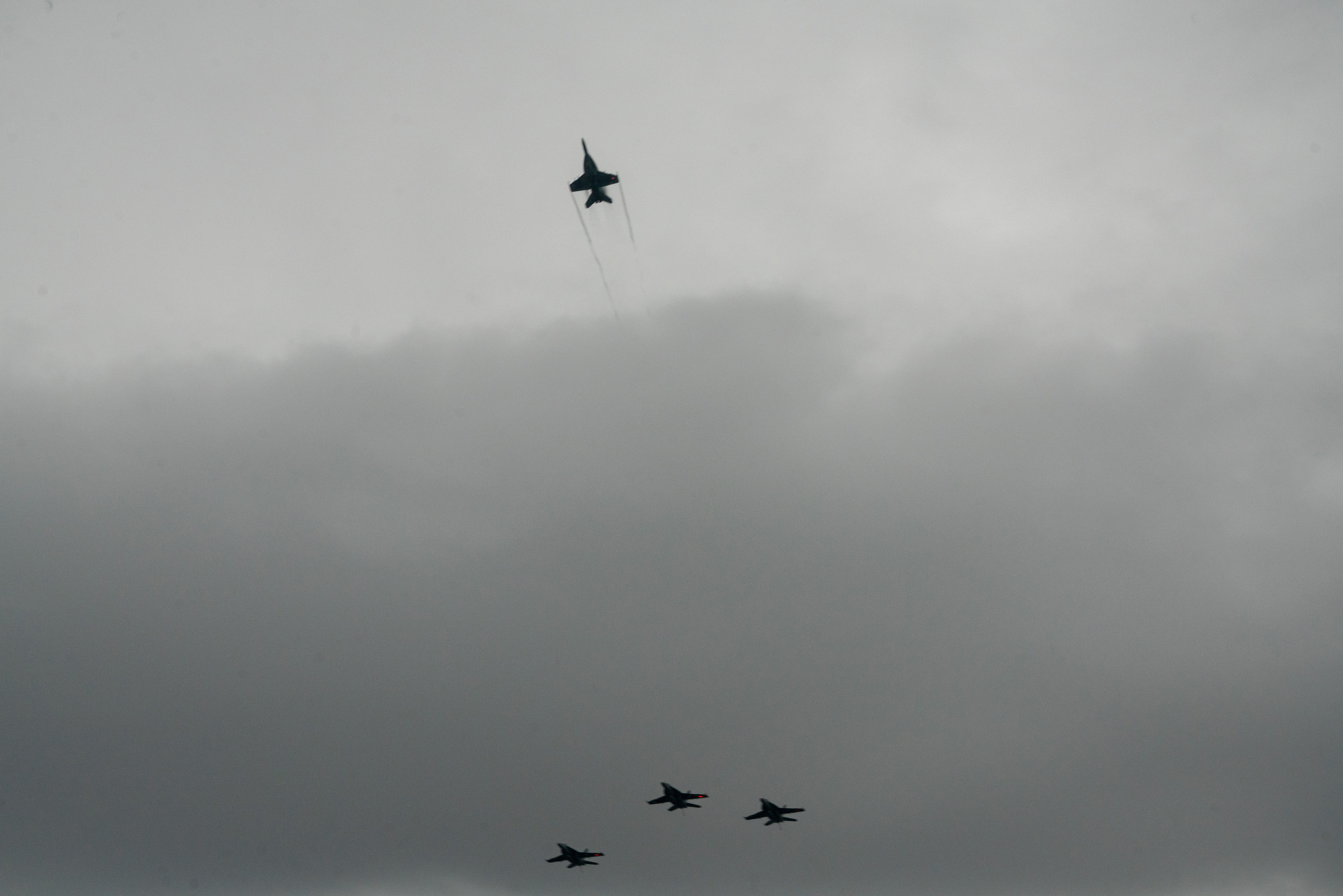
U.S. Navy aviators execute a missing man formation during the memorial flyover of the George Bush Presidential Library Center on December 6, 2018.

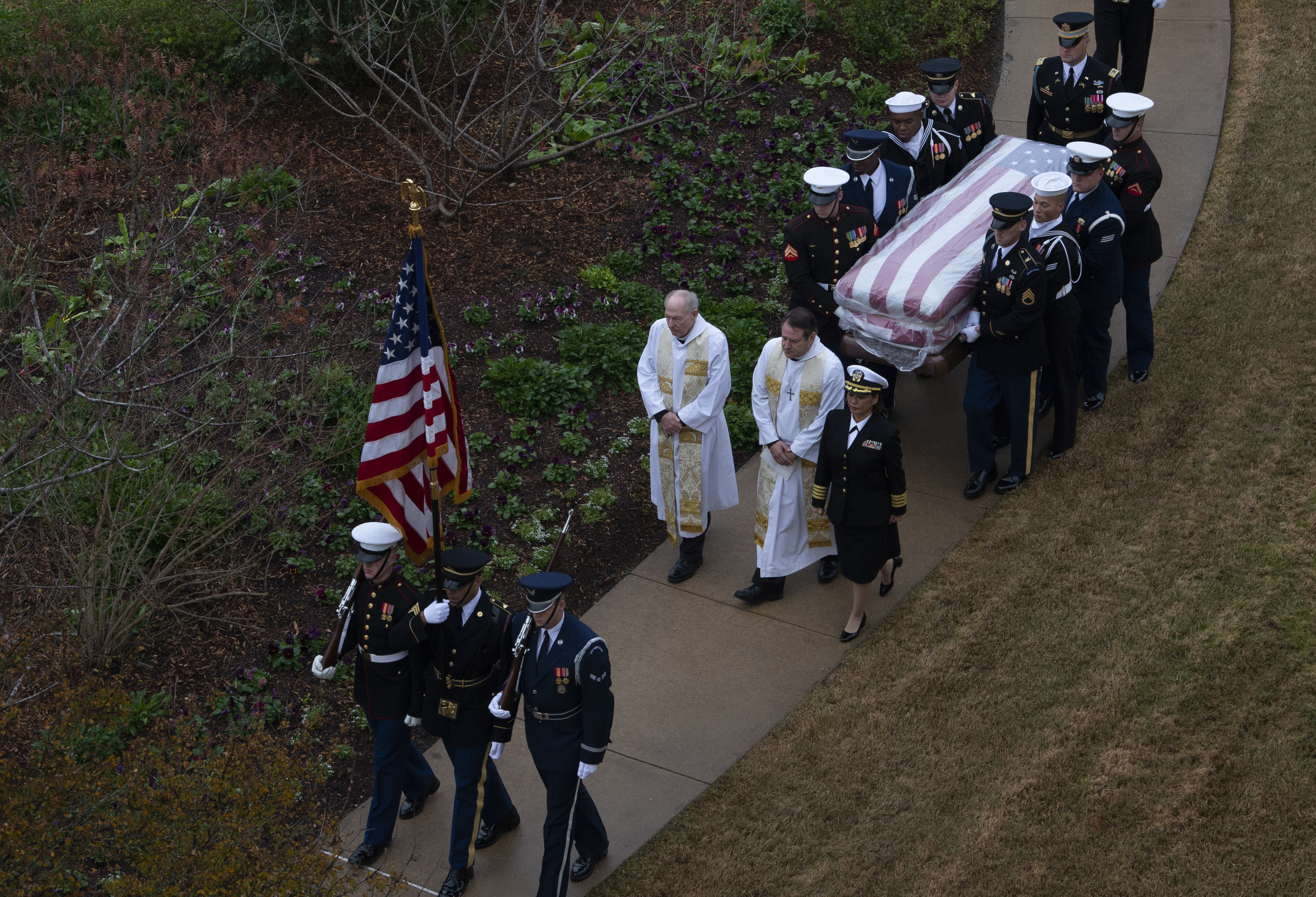
Joint forces honor guard and religious ministers process with the casket to the site of the private family graveside service on December 6, 2018.

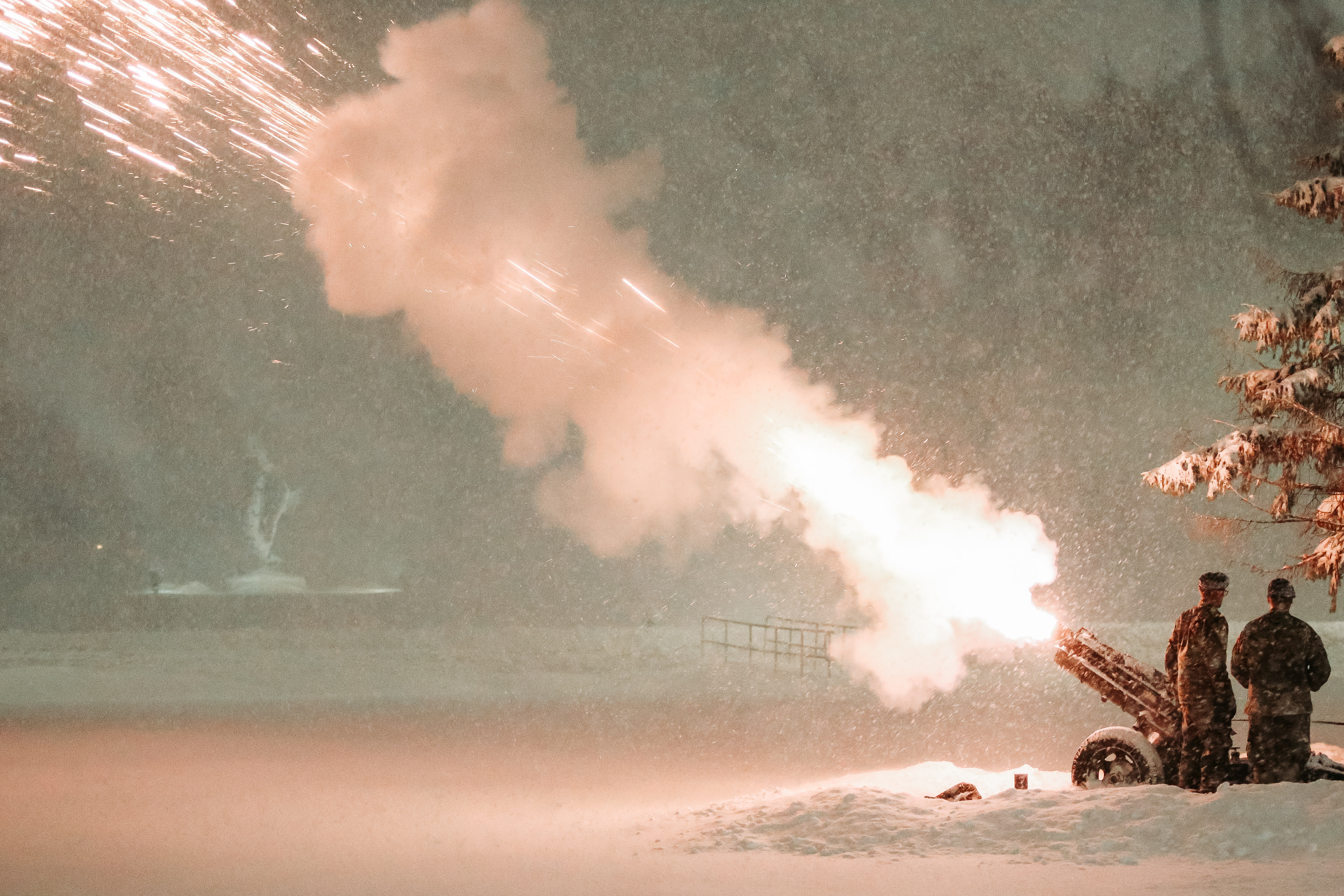
Artillery at Fort Drum, New York, fires the Salute to the Union – 50 successive artillery rounds – marking the end of the burial day on December 6, 2018.

== Dignitaries ==
=== United States ===
- Donald and Melania Trump, president and first lady of the United States
- Barack and Michelle Obama, 44th president of the United States and former first lady of the United States
- George W. (Bush's eldest son) and Laura Bush (Bush's daughter-in-law), 43rd president of the United States and former first lady of the United States
- Bill (Bush's 1992 election opponent) and Hillary Clinton, 42nd president of the United States and former first lady of the United States
- Jimmy and Rosalynn Carter, 39th president of the United States and former first lady of the United States
- Mike and Karen Pence, vice president and second lady of the United States
- Joe and Jill Biden, former vice president of the United States and former second lady of the United States
- Dick (Bush's secretary of defense) and Lynne Cheney, former vice president of the United States and former second lady of the United States
- Al Gore, former vice president of the United States
- Dan (Bush's vice president) and Marilyn Quayle, former vice president of the United States and former second lady of the United States

=== Foreign ===
International leaders attending these services include:

- Governor-General of Australia Peter Cosgrove
- (Bahrain) Prince Abdullah bin Hamad bin Isa Al Khalifa
- Former premier of Bermuda John Swan
- Former prime minister of Canada Brian Mulroney
- Former president of Colombia César Gaviria
- Former president of Estonia Toomas Hendrik Ilves
- Former minister of foreign affairs of France Hubert Védrine
- Chancellor of Germany Angela Merkel
- (Israel) Finance Minister Moshe Kahlon
- Former prime minister of Japan Yasuo Fukuda
- King of Jordan Abdullah II and Queen Rania of Jordan
- Former prime minister of Kuwait Nasser Al-Mohammed Al-Sabah
- Former president of Mexico Carlos Salinas de Gortari
- President of Poland Andrzej Duda and former president Lech Wałęsa
- Former president of Portugal Aníbal Cavaco Silva
- Former emir of Qatar Hamad bin Khalifa Al Thani
- (Taiwan) President of the Legislative Yuan Su Jia-chyuan
- Charles, Prince of Wales; former prime minister of the United Kingdom John Major, and wife Norma Major
- Secretary-General of the United Nations António Guterres

== See also ==
- State funerals in the United States
