= NMAA =

NMAA may refer to:

- National Military Academy of Afghanistan
- National Museum of African Art, a Smithsonian Institution museum
- Navy Mutual Aid Association
- New Mexico Activities Association
