= Navy Mutual =

Navy Mutual Aid Association
- Company type: Nonprofit organization
- Industry: Insurance and Financial services
- Founded: 1879
- Headquarters: Henderson Hall, Arlington, Virginia, United States
- Key people: Brian E. Luther (President, and CEO)
- Products: Life insurance, Annuities, Education
- Revenue: $250 million (2019)
- Total assets: $3 billion (2019)

Navy Mutual, originally established as Navy Mutual Aid Association (NMAA), is a nonprofit, federally tax-exempt, mutual-benefit Veterans Service Organization (VSO) It was established in 1879 by naval officers for the purpose of providing life insurance and annuities to members of the sea services (United States Navy, United States Marine Corps, United States Coast Guard, U.S. Public Health Service, and the National Oceanic and Atmospheric Administration), and their families. Membership for the past decade has averaged 105,000 members. In 2016, Navy Mutual had over 141,000 military members (active, reserve, and retired) and families insured under various plans; by 2019, the number of insurance plans increased to over 145,000 with a member retention rate of 98.4%. For seventeen consecutive years through 2020, Navy Mutual has earned a Fitch Insurer Financial Strength (IFS) rating of A+, with a Stable Rating Outlook.

== History ==
Navy Mutual was established on July 28, 1879, during a meeting of U.S. Navy officers at the Navy Department in Washington, D.C.

Until 1920, only those officers of the Navy and Marine Corps on the active list were eligible for membership. Temporary and reserve officers under 45 years of age – both active and inactive – became eligible in 1920. Membership was extended to officers of the U.S. Coast Guard in 1925. Female officers of the United States Navy became eligible in 1947. Eligibility was later expanded to include commissioned officers of the U.S. Public Health Service (1963) and the National Oceanic and Atmospheric Administration (1972); enlisted personnel of the United States Navy, United States Marine Corps, and United States Coast Guard (1980); and retired personnel of the sea services (1993). In 2020, Navy Mutual expanded their bylaws to extend membership eligibility to active duty, retired, reserve, and honorably discharged personnel of the U.S. Army and the U.S. Air Force as well as their families. Only twice in Navy Mutual history – in 1942 and 1950 – membership was temporarily halted. This was due to the entrance of the United States into both World War II and the Korean War, respectively. Membership restrictions were removed shortly after both wars ended. Navy Mutual is headquartered at Joint Base Myer-Henderson Hall in Arlington, Virginia.

== Membership Eligibility ==
To qualify to become a member of Navy Mutual Aid Association the person must on active duty, in the Reserve Component, or retired from the following U.S. military branches,

- U.S. Navy (USN)
- U.S. Marine Corps (USMC)
- U.S. Coast Guard (USCG)
- U.S. Air Force (USAF)
- U.S. Public Health Service Commissioned Corps (USPHSCC)
- National Oceanic and Atmospheric Administration (NOAA)

or be an honorably discharged veteran of the Navy, Marine Corps, Army, Air Force, Coast Guard, NOAA, or USPHSCC who resides in Virginia, Hawaiʻi, Maryland, North Carolina, South Carolina, Arizona, Connecticut, Florida, Texas, Oregon, & Rhode Island.

== Services ==
Navy Mutual Aid Association offers Life insurance and Annuities services to its members.

=== Life Insurance ===
Navy Mutual Aid Association offers these types of life insurance:

- Flagship Whole Life (Whole Life Insurance)
- Level II 'Plus' (Level Term Life Insurance for individuals aged 40+)
- Flex Term (Group priced Term Life Insurance for individuals under age 40)

=== Annuities ===
Navy Mutual Aid Association offers these types of annuities:

- Single Premium Deferred Annuities
- Flexible Premium Retirement Annuity
- Single Premium Immediate Annuity

== Staff ==
The current President and CEO of Navy Mutual is retired Rear Admiral Brian E. Luther, USN, who has served in that role since October 2020. He was preceded by retired Rear Admiral Bruce Engelhardt, USN. The current Chair of the Board is retired Vice Admiral Stanley R. Szemborski, USN, who assumed the position in April 2020.
