= Brian E. Luther =

US Navy admiral (born 1962)

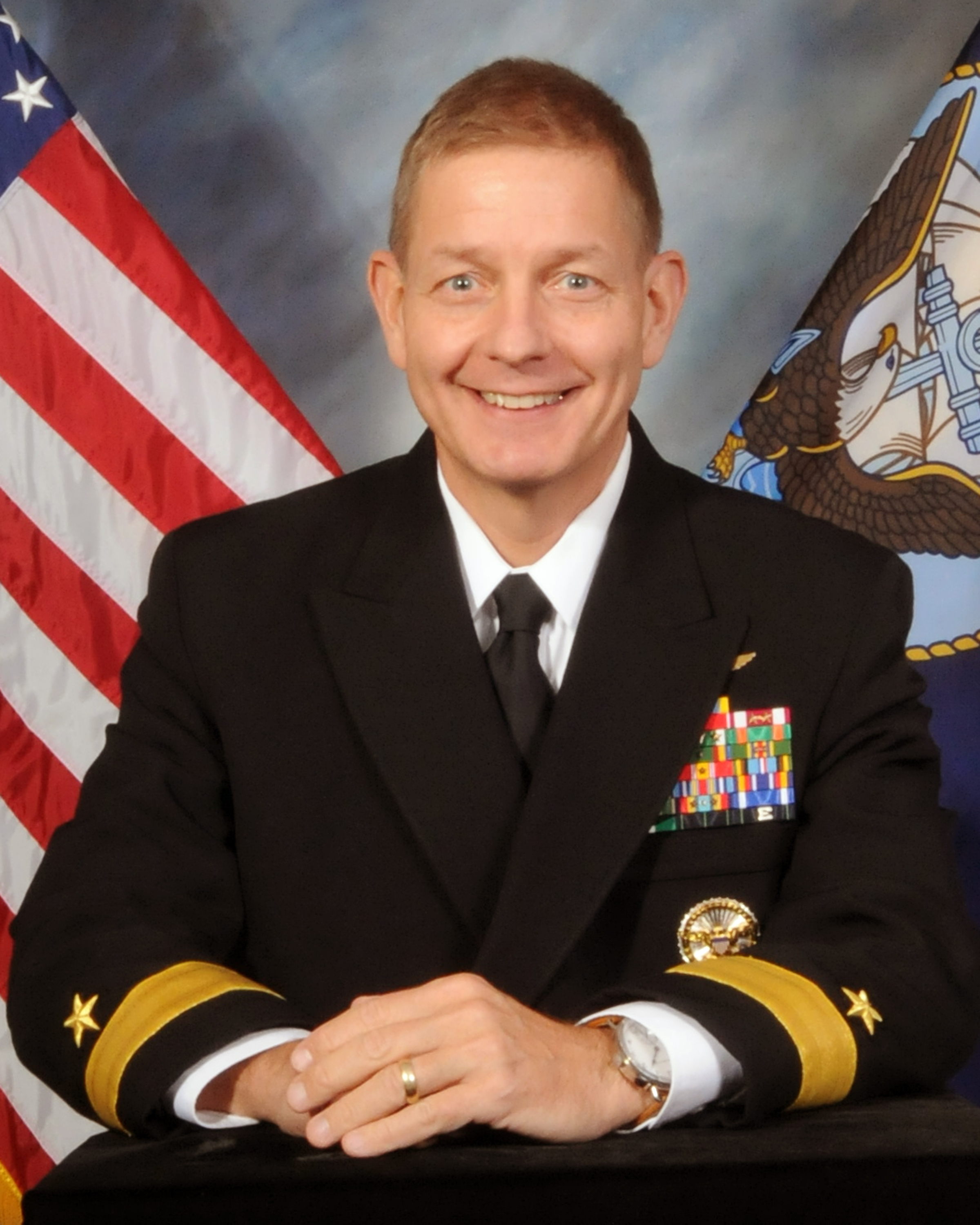
- Born: Brian Eugene Luther; 1962 (age 63–64)
- Military career
- Allegiance: United States
- Branch: United States Navy
- Rank: Rear Admiral
- Commands: Carrier Strike Group 2 USS George H. W. Bush (CVN-77); USS Tarawa (LHA-1); VS-24
- Conflicts: Gulf War; War in Afghanistan

Brian Eugene Luther (born 1962) is a rear admiral in the United States Navy.

Luther is a native of Trumbull, Connecticut. He graduated from Marquette University and George Mason University.

== Career ==
After serving in the War in Afghanistan (2001–2021), Luther commanded the USS Tarawa (LHA-1) on her final deployment. Later, he became commander of the USS George H. W. Bush (CVN-77), commanding the ship on her maiden deployment in 2011.

Previously, Luther served in The Pentagon during the Gulf War. Additionally, he has been assigned to the Assistant Secretary of the Navy (Financial Management and Comptroller) and the Chief of Naval Operations. He also served as XO of The USS Nimitz CVN 68.

Awards he has received include the Defense Superior Service Medal, the Legion of Merit, the Bronze Star Medal and the Meritorious Service Medal.

Rear Adm. Brian Luther is a native of Trumbull, Connecticut. He is a 1984 graduate of Marquette University of Milwaukee, Wisconsin, where he received a Bachelor of Science in Computer Science. He holds a Master of Business Administration (MBA) from George Mason University in Fairfax, Virginia.

Luther commanded the Scouts of Sea Control Squadron (VS) 24, which participated in Operation Enduring Freedom and was awarded the Battle "E", Chief of Naval Operations (CNO) Safety "S" and the Golden Anchor retention excellence award. He commanded USS Tarawa (LHA-1) for her final deployment where her crew earned the Department of the Navy Safety Award, the Admiral Flatley Memorial Award for Aviation Safety, Battle "E" and Golden Anchor. He commanded USS George H. W. Bush (CVN-77) for her maiden deployment where her crew earned the Battenberg Cup as the best all-around ship in the U.S. Atlantic fleet, the "Jig Dog" Ramage award for excellence in carrier operations, the Admiral Flatley Award, Battle "E" and Golden Anchor. He most recently served as commander, Carrier Strike Group 2.

Prior to squadron command, his afloat tours included service as a pilot and air wing staff officer aboard various aircraft carriers on the east coast. Following nuclear power training, Luther served as the executive officer of the USS Nimitz (CVN 68).

Ashore, Luther was introduced to the Pentagon as a Joint Staff intern (J6K) and watchstander in the National Military Command Center during Operation Desert Storm, followed by assignments as the tactical air analyst for the Director, Strike and Amphibious Warfare Division (OP-74) on the staff of the chief of naval operations and program analyst at the S-3 Class Desk, Naval Air Systems Command. Luther later served two tours on the staff of the assistant secretary of the Navy, Financial Management and Comptroller as a budget analyst and as assistant director, Office of Budget. He also served as congressional liaison to the House and Senate Appropriations Committees in the Office of the Secretary of Defense (Comptroller) and as the Chief of Naval Operations director for Operations and Plans (N31).

Luther's awards include the Defense Superior Service Medal, Legion of Merit, Bronze Star, Meritorious Service Medal, and various campaign, unit and service awards including the Sea Control Wing Atlantic Pilot of the Year. In addition, he was recognized as the honor graduate for his MBA program. He has flown over 3,400 flight hours and has accumulated 825 carrier landings.
