= Deaths in October 2018 =

The following is a list of notable deaths in October 2018.

Entries for each day are listed alphabetically by surname. A typical entry lists information in the following sequence:

- Name, age, country of citizenship at birth, subsequent country of citizenship (if applicable), reason for notability, cause of death (if known), and reference.

== October 2018 ==
=== 1 ===
- Shirin Aliabadi, 45, Iranian visual artist, cancer.
- Charles Aznavour, 94, French-Armenian singer ("La Bohème", "She"), lyricist and actor (Shoot the Piano Player), complications from pulmonary edema.
- Peter C. Bjarkman, 77, American baseball historian and author.
- John H. Bryan, 81, American business executive and philanthropist (Millennium Park), CEO of Sara Lee (1975–2001), complications from lung cancer.
- Mario Castellazzi, 82, Italian footballer (Spezia, Catania, Livorno).
- Caroline Charrière, 57, Swiss composer, conductor and flautist.
- Stelvio Cipriani, 81, Italian composer, complications from a stroke.
- Ben Daglish, 52, British composer (The Last Ninja), lung cancer.
- Đỗ Mười, 101, Vietnamese politician, General Secretary of the Communist Party (1991–1997), Prime Minister (1988–1991), respiratory and kidney failure.
- Carlos Ezquerra, 70, Spanish comics artist (Judge Dredd, Preacher, Strontium Dog), lung cancer.
- Michael Freedland, 83, British journalist and biographer.
- Jerry González, 69, American bandleader and trumpeter, heart attack.
- Terry Gooding, 87, British Olympic boxer.
- Francesco Greco, 75, Italian politician, Senator (1983–1994).
- Darryl Greenamyer, 82, American aviator and record holder.
- Ronnie Leitch, 64, Sri Lankan singer and actor (Mother Teresa: In the Name of God's Poor, Re Daniel Dawal Migel, Onna Babo), heart attack.
- M. V. V. S. Murthi, 76, Indian academic, businessman and politician, founder of GITAM, MP for Visakhapatnam (1991–1996, 1999–2004), traffic collision.
- Donald Read, 88, British historian.
- Graciano Rocchigiani, 54, German boxer, WBC (1988–1989) and IBF world champion (1998–2000), traffic collision.
- Johnny Rogers, 78, British basketball coach.
- Gord Rowland, 88, Canadian football player (Winnipeg Blue Bombers).
- Meeri Saari, 93, Finnish Olympic shot putter.
- Franco Sar, 84, Italian Olympic decathlete (1960, 1964), heart attack.
- Antoine Sfeir, 69, Lebanese journalist and professor.
- María Teresa Sosa, 88, Guatemalan politician and activist, First Lady (1982–1983).
- Chris Wilkins, 74, South African cricketer (Border, Derbyshire, Natal).
- Élaine Zakaïb, 59, Canadian politician, brain cancer.

=== 2 ===
- Wendy Atkin, 71, British epidemiologist.
- Smilja Avramov, 100, Serbian academic and educator.
- Balabhaskar, 40, Indian violinist, composer and record producer, heart attack.
- Ron Casey, 89, Australian broadcaster and sports journalist.
- Geoff Emerick, 72, English recording engineer (Abbey Road Studios, The Beatles), multi-Grammy winner, heart attack.
- William H. Helfand, 92, American writer.
- Dorothy Hukill, 72, American politician, member of the Florida House of Representatives (2004–2012) and Senate (since 2012), cancer.
- Bob Jones, 91, American cartoonist and illustrator, pulmonary fibrosis.
- Thampi Kannanthanam, 64, Indian film director (Bhoomiyile Rajakkanmar).
- Roman Kartsev, 79, Russian actor (Heart of a Dog, Promised Heaven, Old Hags).
- Jamal Khashoggi, 59, Saudi Arabian journalist, strangled.
- Józef Kokot, 89, Polish footballer.
- Barry Linton, 71, New Zealand cartoonist.
- Wilhelmus Luxemburg, 89, Dutch mathematician.
- Utu Abe Malae, American Samoan businessman, banker and politician.
- Cosimo Ennio Masiello, 88, Italian politician, Mayor of Brindisi (1987–1989) and Senator (1992–1994).
- Ceri Peach, 78, Welsh geographer.
- Hermenegildo Sábat, 85, Uruguayan comic book artist.
- José Lorenzo Sartori, 86, Argentine Roman Catholic prelate, Bishop of San Roque de Presidencia Roque Sáenz Peña (1994–2008).
- Jiggy Smaha, 72, American football player (BC Lions).
- Ole E. Storlien, 83, Norwegian politician.
- Geoffrey Tudor, 94, British Olympic runner.
- Burhan Uray, 87, Chinese-Indonesian timber tycoon and philanthropist.

=== 3 ===
- Elisabeth Andersen, 98, Dutch actress.
- Jiří Bis, 77, Czech politician, Senator (2008–2014).
- Julien Bogaert, 94, Belgian Olympic sprint canoeist (1948).
- Fang Nanjiang, 75, Chinese novelist and major general of the People's Armed Police.
- David Fergusson, 74, British-born New Zealand psychologist, lung cancer.
- Wen Fong, 88, Chinese-American art historian, leukemia.
- Sir Roger Gibbs, 83, British financier.
- Heo Su-gyeong, 54, South Korean poet.
- Ludie Jones, 102, American dancer.
- Joseph Kamaru, 79, Kenyan benga musician and political activist, complications from Parkinson's disease.
- Saak Karapetyan, 58, Russian attorney, Deputy Attorney General, helicopter crash.
- Jay I. Kislak, 96, American businessman.
- Leon M. Lederman, 96, American experimental physicist, Nobel Prize laureate (1988), dementia.
- Bent Lorentzen, 83, Danish composer.
- Marty Pattin, 75, American baseball player (Milwaukee Brewers, Boston Red Sox, Kansas City Royals).
- Hollie Pihl, 90, American judge.
- Hugo Raspoet, 77, Belgian singer and guitarist ("Helena", "Evviva Il Papa").
- Agnes Scanlon, 94, American politician.
- Felix Smith, 100, American aviator.
- Bror Stefenson, 89, Swedish navy admiral.
- Keiichiro Takahara, 87, Japanese businessman, founder of Unicharm.
- Antonio Valero, 86, Spanish footballer.
- John Von Ohlen, 77, American jazz drummer (Blue Wisp Big Band).
- Peter Wales, 89, English cricketer.
- Prosper Weil, 92, French lawyer.
- Edward E. Williams, 73, American economist.

=== 4 ===
- Dave Anderson, 89, American sportswriter (The New York Times), Pulitzer Prize winner (1981).
- Jeanne Ashworth, 80, American speed skater, Olympic bronze medalist (1960), pancreatic cancer.
- Jack Avina, 89, American college basketball coach (Portland Pilots).
- Jinx Beers, 84, American activist and newspaper editor, renal failure.
- Hamiet Bluiett, 78, American jazz saxophonist, complications from a series of strokes.
- Penny Bright, 64, New Zealand political activist, ovarian cancer.
- Jeannine Smith Clark, 89, American educator and activist.
- Kevin Ellison, 31, American football player (San Diego Chargers, Spokane Shock), traffic collision.
- Barrie Frost, 79, New Zealand-born Canadian psychologist and neuroscientist.
- Takumi Furukawa, 101, Japanese film director (Season of the Sun, Cruel Gun Story), heart failure.
- José Lluis, 80, Spanish Olympic basketball player (1960).
- Kurt Malangré, 84, German politician, Lord Mayor of Aachen (1973–1989) and MEP (1979–1999).
- Karl Mildenberger, 80, German boxer, European heavyweight champion (1964–1968).
- Lewis V. Morgan, 88, American politician.
- Walter Paine, 95, American journalist and publisher (Valley News).
- Bert Romp, 59, Dutch equestrian, Olympic champion (1992), kicked by horse.
- José Sacal, 74, Mexican surrealist sculptor.
- Neville Sayers, 91, Australian Olympic modern pentathlete (1956, 1960) and sports shooter (1960).
- Sir John Swinton, 93, British military officer.
- John Tyrrell, 76, British musicologist.
- Will Vinton, 70, American animator (The California Raisins, The Adventures of Mark Twain, Return to Oz), Oscar winner (1974), multiple myeloma.
- Scott Weir, 65, Scottish cricketer.
- Audrey Wells, 58, American film director and screenwriter (Under the Tuscan Sun, The Hate U Give, The Truth About Cats & Dogs), cancer.
- Raymond L. White, 74, American geneticist.
- Konisi Yabaki, 77, Fijian politician, Minister for Fisheries and Forests (2001–2006).

=== 5 ===
- Wayne Berry, 86, American football player (New York Giants).
- John Deeble, 87, Australian health economist.
- Louis A. DeSimone, 96, American Roman Catholic prelate, Auxiliary Bishop of Philadelphia (1981–1997).
- Frank Drum, 87, Australian footballer (Richmond).
- Jimmy Duquennoy, 23, Belgian racing cyclist, heart attack.
- Ray Galton, 88, British scriptwriter (Hancock's Half Hour, Steptoe and Son), dementia.
- Richard Horden, 73, British architect.
- Ed Kenney, 85, American singer and actor (Flower Drum Song).
- Grigorij Khizhnyak, 44, Ukrainian basketball player (Kyiv, Makedonikos, Dnipro), heart attack.
- Herbert Kleber, 84, American psychiatrist.
- Lin Xiao, 97, Chinese politician, Chairman of Henan People's Congress.
- Greg Marx, 68, American football player (Atlanta Falcons).
- Bobby Notkoff, 77, American violinist.
- Ivar Odnes, 55, Norwegian politician, MP (since 2017), cancer.
- Víctor Pey, 103, Spanish-Chilean engineer, counselor of Salvador Allende.
- Hege Skjeie, 63, Norwegian political scientist.
- Rudy Wowor, 74, Indonesian actor, prostate cancer.
- Luis Zuñiga, 79, Chilean boxer.

=== 6 ===
- Don Askarian, 69, Armenian filmmaker.
- John Nicholson Black, 96, British academic and university administrator, Principal of Bedford College, London (1971–1981).
- Eef Brouwers, 79, Dutch journalist and spokesman, Director-general of the RVD (1995–2004).
- Montserrat Caballé, 85, Spanish opera singer, Grammy winner (1968), gallbladder infection.
- Tahir Chaudhry, Pakistani chef, cardiac arrest.
- Edwin-Michael Cortez, 66, American library science professor.
- James Cowan, 76, Australian author.
- Encosta De Lago, 25, Australian racehorse and sire.
- Lorna Cooke deVaron, 97, American choral conductor.
- Boyd Elder, 74, American artist.
- Ira Gasman, 76, American playwright and lyricist, heart failure.
- Paul James, 87, American sportscaster (Utah Utes, BYU Cougars).
- George Kaftan, 90, American basketball player (Boston Celtics).
- Quentin Kenihan, 43, Australian disability advocate and actor (Mad Max: Fury Road), asthma attack.
- Wilf Malcolm, 84, New Zealand pure mathematician, vice-chancellor of the University of Waikato (1985–1994).
- Victoria Marinova, 30, Bulgarian journalist and television presenter, strangled.
- Bert Nederlof, 72, Dutch journalist and radio sports commentator.
- Ramon Neto da Costa, 31, Brazilian footballer (Figueirense), heart attack.
- Robert Pitofsky, 88, American legal scholar.
- Don Sandburg, 87, American actor (Bozo's Circus), complications from Alzheimer's disease.
- Michel Vovelle, 85, French historian.
- Scott Wilson, 76, American actor (The Walking Dead, In Cold Blood, CSI: Crime Scene Investigation), complications from leukemia.

=== 7 ===
- David Barker, 83, British Olympic equestrian.
- René Bouin, 81, French politician, Deputy (2002–2007), Mayor of Chenillé-Changé (1977–2001).
- Boris Braun, 98, Croatian professor and Holocaust survivor.
- Silvester Brito, 81, American poet and academic.
- John Gagliardi, 91, American Hall of Fame college football coach (Saint John's Johnnies).
- Gibba, 93, Italian animator (Il nano e la strega).
- Betty Grissom, 91, American plaintiff winner against NASA contractor.
- Paul Henle, 68, American politician, member of the New Hampshire House of Representatives (2012–2018), brain injury.
- Brian Hughes, 80, Welsh footballer (Swansea City, Atlanta Chiefs).
- Eija Krogerus, 86, Finnish bowler.
- Patrice L'Heureux, 46, Canadian boxer, heart attack.
- Kurt Leitner, 72, Austrian footballer.
- Nino Lombardo, 91, Italian politician, Deputy (1976–1994), heart failure.
- Peggy McCay, 90, American actress (Days of Our Lives, Love of Life, Murphy's Romance).
- Moi-Yo Miller, 104, Australian actress and illusionist, dementia.
- Ludo Monset, 72, Belgian politician, Senator (1991–1995), Mayor of Blankenberge (1995–2011).
- Peter Nyombi, 64, Ugandan politician, Attorney General (2011–2015), heart failure.
- John Odey, 58, Nigerian politician, Minister of Environment (since 2008), cancer.
- Moses Olaiya, 82, Nigerian actor, complications from a stroke.
- Oleg Pavlov, 48, Russian writer, heart attack.
- Ken Rickards, 89, English footballer (Hull City, Darlington).
- Marie M. Runyon, 103, American political activist and politician, member of the New York State Assembly (1975–1976).
- Natwar Thakkar, 86, Indian social worker.
- John Wicks, 65, British singer and songwriter (The Records).
- Tamio Yamakawa, 96, Japanese biochemist.
- Celeste Yarnall, 74, American actress (Eve, The Mechanic, Star Trek), ovarian cancer.

=== 8 ===
- Fernando Albán, 56, Venezuelan lawyer and politician, Libertador Bolivarian Municipality councilman (since 2012).
- Shibly Aziz, 75, Sri Lankan lawyer and politician, Attorney General (1995–1996).
- Neville Chamberlain, 78, British Anglican prelate, Bishop of Brechin (1997–2005).
- Tim Chandler, 58, American rock bassist (Daniel Amos, The Swirling Eddies, The Choir).
- Chris Curran, 44, Australian footballer (Collingwood).
- Luther F. Hackett, 85, American politician.
- Dina Haroun, 44, Syrian actress (Maraya), lung infection.
- Alfred Holland, 91, British-born Australian Anglican bishop.
- Juan Heredia, 76, Spanish footballer (Mallorca).
- Arnold Kopelson, 83, American film producer (Platoon, The Fugitive, Seven), Oscar winner (1987).
- John Quinn, 85, American theoretical physicist.
- Geoff Smith, 76, Australian sprint cyclist, Olympic tandem (1960).
- George Taliaferro, 91, American professional (Baltimore Colts) and college Hall of Fame football player (Indiana Hoosiers), first African-American selected in an NFL draft.
- Joseph Tydings, 90, American lawyer (Eisenstadt v. Baird) and politician, U.S. Senator from Maryland (1965–1971).
- Hiroshi Wajima, 70, Japanese sumo yokozuna (Hanakago stable) and professional wrestler (AJPW), throat cancer.
- David Wise, 88, American journalist (New York Herald-Tribune), pancreatic cancer.

=== 9 ===
- Carolyn Blanchard Allen, 97, American politician, Member of the Wisconsin State Assembly (1963–1970).
- Heiki Arike, 53, Estonian politician, Minister of the Interior (1993–1994).
- Robert Bausch, 73, American author, multiple myeloma.
- Tanvir Chowdhury, 41, Bangladeshi footballer (Abahani Ltd. Dhaka, Sheikh Russel KC).
- Robert W. Cox, 92, Canadian political scientist.
- Pat Gorman, 85, British actor (Doctor Who, The Nightmare Man).
- Thomas M. Hannigan, 78, American politician, member of the California State Assembly (1978–1996).
- Anna Harvey, 74, British fashion editor (Vogue) and stylist (Princess Diana).
- Tony Hopper, 42, English footballer (Carlisle United), motor neurone disease.
- Diane Jergens, 83, American actress (The Adventures of Ozzie and Harriet, The Bob Cummings Show, Walt Disney's Wonderful World of Color).
- George W. Landau, 98, American diplomat.
- Larry Larrañaga, 80, American politician, member of the New Mexico House of Representatives (1995–2018), Creutzfeldt-Jacob disease.
- Lü Junchang, 53, Chinese palaeontologist (Tongtianlong, Qianzhousaurus, Darwinopterus).
- Frank Padavan, 83, American politician, member of the New York Senate (1973–2010), heart attack.
- José Santiago, 90, Puerto Rican baseball player (Cleveland Indians, Kansas City Athletics).
- Warner Saunders, 83, American news anchor (WMAQ-TV, WBBM-TV).
- Werner Scheler, 95, German physician and pharmacologist, president of the East German Academy of Sciences (1979–1990).
- William Shearer, 81, American immunologist (David Vetter).
- Alex Spanos, 95, American real estate developer and football team owner (Los Angeles Chargers), dementia.
- Thomas A. Steitz, 78, American biochemist, Nobel Prize laureate (2009), pancreatic cancer.
- Aranka Szabó-Bartha, 92, Hungarian Olympic sprinter.
- Venantino Venantini, 88, Italian actor (Seven Deaths in the Cat's Eye, City of the Living Dead, Cannibal Ferox), complications from surgery.
- Carolyn Warner, 88, American politician, Arizona Superintendent of Public Instruction (1975–1987).
- William Wilbanks, 78, American criminologist.
- Roman Zabzaliuk, 58, Ukrainian politician, MP (2006–2014), cancer.

=== 10 ===
- Andie Airfix, 72, British graphic designer and album artist (Def Leppard, Metallica).
- Malcolm Andrews, 73–74, Australian writer.
- Yvan Blot, 70, French politician, MEP (1989–1994).
- Louis Brouillard, 97, American Roman Catholic priest.
- Achille Cutrera, 89, Italian politician, Senator (1987–1994).
- Raymond Danon, 88, French film producer (The Gardener of Argenteuil, Someone Behind the Door, Lovers Like Us).
- Denzil Davies, 80, British politician, MP (1970–2005).
- Frank Deem, 90, American politician, member of the West Virginia House of Delegates (1954–1962, 1988–1990, since 2014) and Senate (1964–1978, 1994–2010), pneumonia.
- Don Eddy, 71, American baseball player (Chicago White Sox), pancreatic cancer.
- Laurence Forristal, 87, Irish Roman Catholic prelate, Bishop of Ossory (1981–2007).
- Zíbia Gasparetto, 92, Brazilian spiritualist writer, pancreatic cancer.
- Theresa Hightower, 64, American jazz singer, colon cancer.
- Angelo Marino, 62, Italian art curator.
- Mary Midgley, 99, British moral philosopher.
- Raye Montague, 83, American naval engineer (Oliver Hazard Perry class), heart failure.
- Richard T. Morgan, 66, American politician, member of the North Carolina House of Representatives (1990–2006).
- Peter Ramseier, 73, Swiss footballer (Basel, national team).
- Greg Stafford, 70, American game designer (White Bear and Red Moon, King of Dragon Pass, HeroQuest).
- Bruce N. Whitman, 85, American aviation executive.
- Tex Winter, 96, American Hall of Fame basketball coach (Kansas State Wildcats, Chicago Bulls), innovator of the triangle offense.

=== 11 ===
- G. D. Agrawal, 86, Indian environmental activist, starvation following hunger strike.
- Ireneo A. Amantillo, 83, Filipino Roman Catholic prelate, Auxiliary Bishop of Cagayan de Oro (1976–1978) and Tandag (1978–2001), prostate cancer.
- Paul Andreu, 80, French architect (Charles de Gaulle Airport, National Grand Theatre of China).
- Fatos Arapi, 89, Albanian poet.
- Leif Axmyr, 80, Swedish double murderer.
- Marie Bignold, 91, Australian politician, member of the New South Wales Legislative Council (1984–1991).
- Eileen Boardman, 76, American statistician.
- Richard Brookins, 96, American corporal.
- Charlie Crickmore, 76, English footballer (Hull City, Bournemouth, Notts County).
- Robert Dean, 89, American ufologist.
- Sir Doug Ellis, 94, English entrepreneur and football club chairman (Aston Villa).
- Milton Gendel, 99, American-Italian photographer and art critic (ARTnews).
- Carol Hall, 82, American composer and lyricist (The Best Little Whorehouse in Texas), complications from primary progressive aphasia.
- Labinot Harbuzi, 32, Swedish footballer (Malmö FF, S.B.V. Excelsior, Gençlerbirliği), heart attack.
- Duncan Johnson, 80, Canadian-born British DJ, complications from Parkinson's disease.
- Dieter Kemper, 81, German racing cyclist.
- Carlo Montemagno, 62, American biomedical engineer, complications from cancer.
- Anatoli Levitin, 96, Russian painter and art educator.
- Pran Nevile, 95, Indian art historian.
- P. Chandrasekhara Rao, 82, Indian jurist.
- Yoshito Sengoku, 72, Japanese politician, Minister of Justice (2010–2011), lung cancer.
- Engelbert Siebler, 81, German Roman Catholic prelate, Auxiliary Bishop of Munich and Freising (1986–2012).
- Jimbo Simpson, 60, Northern Irish paramilitary (UDA), lung cancer.
- Hebe Uhart, 81, Argentine writer.

=== 12 ===
- Pik Botha, 86, South African politician, Minister of Foreign Affairs (1977–1994).
- George Castledine, 72, British nursing educator.
- Chang Chun-yen, 81, Taiwanese engineer, President of National Chiao Tung University, member of Academia Sinica, cancer.
- Colleen Conway-Welch, 74, American academic administrator (Vanderbilt School of Nursing), Nursing Living Legend, pancreatic cancer.
- Rudy Horn, 85, German juggler.
- Tom Jago, 93, British liquor executive and distiller, creator of Baileys Irish Cream.
- Kim Chang-ho, 49, South Korean mountaineer, fall.
- Takehisa Kosugi, 80, Japanese composer and violinist, esophageal cancer.
- Pat Leane, 88, Australian athlete, Olympic decathlon (1952 and 1956).
- Helen Neville, 72, Canadian-born American psychologist and neuroscientist.
- Hugh Poulin, 87, Canadian politician and judge.
- A. G. Russell, 85, American knife maker.
- Ben Skora, 81, American roboticist and inventor.
- Jan Jakob Tønseth, 71, Norwegian author.
- Claude Zilberberg, 80, French semiotician.

=== 13 ===
- Jockin Arputham, 71, Indian urban planner and social worker.
- Chakra Prasad Bastola, 74, Nepalese politician.
- Marshall Bennett, 97, American real estate developer.
- Jean Bienvenue, 90, Canadian politician.
- Fabien Eboussi Boulaga, 84, Cameroonian philosopher.
- Naomi Breslau, 86, American sociologist and psychiatric epidemiologist.
- François Jacques Bussini, 82, French Roman Catholic prelate, Bishop of Amiens (1985–1987).
- William Coors, 102, American brewer (Coors Brewing Company).
- Annapurna Devi, 91, Indian classical surbahar player.
- Robert W. Doran, 73, New Zealand computer scientist.
- Vic Emerson, 69, English musician (Mandalaband, Sad Café), pancreatic cancer.
- Edgar S. Harris Jr., 93, American Air Force lieutenant general.
- Patricia Hollis, Baroness Hollis of Heigham, 77, British politician.
- Sue Hubbell, 83, American author, dementia.
- Parithi Ilamvazhuthi, 58, Indian politician, heart attack.
- Don Leo Jonathan, 87, American-Canadian Hall of Fame professional wrestler (NWA).
- Meher Kabir, 97, Bangladeshi academic and litterateur.
- János Konkoly, 78, Hungarian Olympic diver.
- Nikolai Pankin, 69, Russian breaststroke swimmer, Olympic bronze medalist (1968) and swimming coach.
- Georgeta Pitica, 88, Romanian table tennis player, world champion (1961).
- Gerhard Prinzing, 75, German Olympic alpine skier (1968).
- Jim Taylor, 83, American Hall of Fame football player (Green Bay Packers, New Orleans Saints).
- Johannes Weertman, 93, American geophysicist.
- Sylvia Weir, 93, South African pediatrician.

=== 14 ===
- Vicente Almeida d'Eça, 100, Portuguese military officer, Governor of Cape Verde (1974–1975).
- Eduardo Arroyo, 81, Spanish painter, set designer and writer.
- Enrique Baliño, 90, Uruguayan basketball player, Olympic bronze medalist (1952).
- Patrick Baumann, 51, Swiss basketball executive, Secretary General of FIBA (since 2003), heart attack.
- Ahmed Boustila, 74, Algerian military officer, Commander of the Gendarmerie Nationale (2000–2015).
- Peter Brackley, 67, British football commentator, heart attack.
- William Roy Branch, 72, British-born South African herpetologist.
- Robert Bushby, 91, American aircraft designer (Mustang Aeronautics Mustang II).
- Tom Delahunty, 83, British-born New Zealand football referee, FIFA list (1969–1984).
- Milena Dravić, 78, Serbian actress (Destination Death, Special Treatment, St. George Shoots the Dragon).
- Per Theodor Haugen, 86, Norwegian actor (The Pinchcliffe Grand Prix, Støv på hjernen).
- Germ Hofma, 93, Dutch footballer (Heerenveen, national team).
- Abdulaziz Jassim, 61, Qatari actor.
- H. G. Jones, 94, American archivist.
- Brian Kinsella, 64, Canadian ice hockey player (Washington Capitals).
- Donald Stovel Macdonald, 86, Canadian politician and diplomat, MP (1962–1978), Government House Leader (1968–1970), and High Commissioner in the UK (1988–1991).
- R. Burnett Miller, 95, American politician, Mayor of Sacramento, California (1982).
- Bengt Harding Olson, 81, Swedish politician, MP (1985–1998).
- Mel Ramos, 83, American artist, heart failure.
- Valeriy Shmarov, 74, Ukrainian politician, Minister of Defence (1994–1996).
- Gösta Svensson, 88, Swedish Olympic high jumper.
- Dick Tinkham, 86, American basketball executive, co-founder of the American Basketball Association, muscular dystrophy.
- Wu Zhaonan, 92, Taiwanese xiangsheng comedian, multiple organ failure.

=== 15 ===
- Paul Allen, 65, American businessman and sports team owner (Seattle Seahawks, Portland Trail Blazers), co-founder of Microsoft, septic shock.
- William Edwin Beckel, 92, Canadian academic administrator, President of University of Lethbridge (1972–1979) and Carleton University (1979–1989).
- Cicely Berry, 92, British theatre director and voice coach.
- Mario Buatta, 82, American interior designer, pneumonia.
- Maximira Figueiredo, 79, Brazilian actress and voice actress, lung cancer.
- Vincent Giblin, 73, American labor union leader.
- Shelley Hamlin, 69, American professional golfer, breast cancer.
- Eugeniusz Kamiński, 86, Polish actor.
- John Knox, 90, British chemist.
- Cindy Li, 43, American web designer, cancer.
- Horst Mann, 91, German Olympic sprinter.
- Ramón Darío Molina Jaramillo, 83, Colombian Roman Catholic prelate, Bishop of Montería (1984–2001) and Neiva (2001–2012), fall.
- Michael H. O'Brien, 64, American politician, member of the Pennsylvania House of Representatives (since 2007), heart attack.
- Arto Paasilinna, 76, Finnish novelist (The Year of the Hare), complications from a stroke.
- Nancy-Lou Patterson, 89, Canadian artist.
- Devarick Scandrett, 34, American football player (Green Bay Packers).
- Fernando Serena, 77, Spanish footballer (Real Madrid, Sant Andreu, national team).
- Bob Spoo, 80, American football coach (Eastern Illinois Panthers).
- Joe Stanka, 87, American baseball player (Chicago White Sox, Nankai Hawks).
- William Thompson, 96, American admiral, led development of United States Navy Memorial, complications from cancer.
- Ray Truant, 88, American-born Canadian football player (Hamilton Tiger-Cats).
- Jim Wiechers, 74, American professional golfer.

=== 16 ===
- Thomas Aisu, 64, Ugandan physician and educator, heart attack.
- Ismail Amat, 83, Chinese politician, Chairman of Xinjiang (1979–1985), State Councillor (1993–2003).
- Pierre Barlaguet, 86, French football player and manager (Nîmes).
- Oleh Bazylevych, 80, Ukrainian football player (Dynamo Kyiv) and manager (national team).
- María Cervera, 62, Peruvian Olympic volleyball player.
- Joseph R. Cistone, 69, American Roman Catholic prelate, Bishop of Saginaw (since 2009), lung cancer.
- Pita Elisara, 41, American football player (San Francisco Demons).
- Patricia Wright Gwyn, 89, Canadian-born American politician.
- David Helwig, 80, Canadian poet.
- Dave Hill, 80, American baseball player (Kansas City Athletics), cancer.
- Dennis Hof, 72, American brothel owner (Moonlite BunnyRanch) and reality show personality (Cathouse: The Series).
- Even Hovdhaugen, 77, Norwegian linguist.
- Walter Dee Huddleston, 92, American politician, U.S. Senator from Kentucky (1973–1985).
- Sid Michaels Kavulich, 62, American sportscaster (WBRE-TV) and politician, member of the Pennsylvania House of Representatives (since 2011), complications from heart surgery.
- Ian Kiernan, 78, Australian yachtsman and environmental campaigner (Clean Up Australia), cancer.
- Wayne Krenchicki, 64, American baseball player (Cincinnati Reds, Baltimore Orioles).
- Berthold Leibinger, 87, German engineer and philanthropist.
- Albert Lexie, 76, American philanthropist.
- Dale Linderman, 94, American politician.
- Giovanni Moretti, 94, Italian Roman Catholic prelate, Archbishop of Vartana (since 1971), Apostolic Nuncio (1971–1999).
- Paul O'Brien, 64, British chemist.
- Aldo Pedrana, 84, Italian Olympic skier.
- Dimitar Petrov, 93, Bulgarian film director (Porcupines Are Born Without Bristles, With Children at the Seaside, A Dog in a Drawer).
- Siona Shimshi, 79, Israeli artist.
- Lidija Sotlar, 89, Slovenian ballerina and teacher.
- Margaret Thorsborne, 91, Australian conservationist.
- Jacob Weinroth, 71, Israeli lawyer, cancer.
- Chuck Wilson, 70, American jazz saxophonist, liver failure.

=== 17 ===
- Denis Adam, 94, German-born New Zealand businessman.
- Margaret Becklake, 96, Canadian epidemiologist and academic.
- Charlie Blanton, 82, American racecar driver.
- Enrique Bolín, 78, Spanish industrialist and politician, Mayor of Benalmádena (1966–1984, 1984, 1995–2007) and Senator (1986–1989).
- Carlos Boloña, 68, Peruvian economist and politician, Minister of Economy and Finance (1991–1993, 2000).
- Elizabeth Fee, 71, Northern Irish-born American historian, complications from amyotrophic lateral sclerosis.
- Sebastian Fischer, 90, German actor (The Dragon's Blood).
- Valters Frīdenbergs, 30, Latvian singer (Valters and Kaža), contestant in Eurovision Song Contest 2005, cancer.
- Leone Frollo, 87, Italian comic book artist (Biancaneve).
- Cornelius Gallagher, 97, American politician, member of the U.S. House of Representatives from New Jersey's 13th district (1959–1973).
- Ara Güler, 90, Turkish photojournalist, heart attack.
- Pauline Knowles, 50, Scottish actress, heart attack.
- Sir Ngātata Love, 81, New Zealand Māori leader.
- Jacques Monory, 94, French painter and filmmaker.
- Geoff Scott, 61, English football player (Stoke City, Leicester, Birmingham) and manager, cancer.
- Derrick Sherwin, 82, English television producer (Doctor Who, Paul Temple) and actor.
- Abbondio Smerghetto, 87, Italian Olympic rower.
- Sir Thomas Thorp, 92, New Zealand jurist, judge of the High Court (1979–1996).
- Kōji Tsujitani, 56, Japanese voice actor (Inuyasha, Mobile Suit Gundam 0080: War in the Pocket, The Irresponsible Captain Tylor), stroke.
- Robert J. Walsh, 70, American television composer (The Transformers, G.I. Joe: A Real American Hero, Muppet Babies).
- Fritz Wittmann, 85, German politician, MP (1971–1994, 1996–1998), president of the Federation of Expellees (1994–1998).

=== 18 ===
- Elihu Abrahams, 91, American theoretical physicist.
- Abdul Raziq Achakzai, 39, Afghan police officer, shot.
- Ayub Bachchu, 56, Bangladeshi singer-songwriter (Love Runs Blind), heart attack.
- Anthea Bell, 82, British literary translator (Asterix).
- Todd Bol, 62, American teacher and public bookcase proponent, creator of Little Free Library, pancreatic cancer.
- Dick Cole, 92, American baseball player (Pittsburgh Pirates).
- Abdel Rahman Swar al-Dahab, 83, Sudanese military officer and politician, President (1985–1986).
- David J. Gleneck, 84, American politician.
- Jeff Hallebone, 89, Australian cricketer.
- Randolph Hokanson, 103, American classical pianist.
- Danny Leiner, 57, American film director (Harold & Kumar Go to White Castle, Dude, Where's My Car?, The Great New Wonderful), lung cancer.
- Li Lianda, 84, Chinese pharmacologist, academician of the Chinese Academy of Engineering.
- Pat Lupoff, 81, American magazine editor (Xero).
- Judit Magos-Havas, 67, Hungarian table tennis player.
- Izumi Maki, 49, Japanese Olympic long-distance runner (1992, 1996), breast cancer.
- Åke Ortmark, 89, Swedish radio journalist, author and television presenter.
- Hideo Osabe, 84, Japanese author, heart failure.
- Lisbeth Palme, 87, Swedish child psychologist and philanthropist.
- Harrison E. Rowe, 91, American electrical engineer.
- Dick Slater, 67, American professional wrestler (WCW, WWF, Mid-South).
- Darren Stewart, 52, Australian soccer player (Newcastle Breakers, Johor) and manager (Maldives national team).
- U Thuzana, 71, Burmese Buddhist monk, leader of the Democratic Karen Buddhist Army (1994–2010).
- N. D. Tiwari, 93, Indian politician, Minister of External Affairs (1986–1987) and Finance (1987–1988), multiple organ failure.
- Frank Young, 89, Canadian Olympic rower.

=== 19 ===
- Werner Cohn, 91–92, German-born Canadian sociologist.
- Charles Y. Glock, 99, American sociologist.
- Åge Hovengen, 90, Norwegian politician, MP (1977–1989).
- Takanobu Hozumi, 87, Japanese actor (The Demon, Mr. Baseball, The X from Outer Space), gallbladder cancer.
- William N. Jones, 98, American politician.
- Walter Knödel, 92, Austrian mathematician and computer scientist.
- Victor Marchetti, 88, American CIA agent and author (The CIA and the Cult of Intelligence), complications from dementia.
- Sir John McGrath, 73, New Zealand jurist, judge of the Supreme Court (2005–2015).
- Tom Meehan, 92, Australian footballer (St Kilda, Fitzroy).
- Dick Modzelewski, 87, American football player (Cleveland Browns, New York Giants).
- Tom Neville, 78–79, Irish hurler (Wexford).
- Patsy Dan Rodgers, 74, Irish painter and musician, King of Tory.
- Osamu Shimomura, 90, Japanese organic chemist, Nobel Prize laureate (2008).
- Bhola Singh, 79, Indian politician, MP (since 2014).
- Diana Sowle, 88, American actress (Willy Wonka & the Chocolate Factory, Fallout 3, Clear and Present Danger).
- Dena Vane-Kirkman, 74, British magazine editor (Woman's World), heart failure.

=== 20 ===
- Jane Actman, 69, American actress (The Paul Lynde Show).
- Frederick C. Aldrich, 94, American politician.
- Jun Ashida, 88, Japanese fashion designer, pneumonia.
- Bruno Bertotti, 87, Italian physicist.
- Martin Bott, 92, British geologist.
- Gaétan Gervais, 74, Canadian historian and author, co-designer of the Franco-Ontarian flag.
- Gerard Houlton, 79, English cricketer.
- Marie Jepsen, 78, Danish politician, MEP.
- Wim Kok, 80, Dutch politician and trade union leader, deputy prime minister (1989–1994), prime minister (1994–2002), heart failure.
- Walter Kwok, 68, Hong Kong real estate developer (Sun Hung Kai Properties), complications from a stroke.
- Aubrey Manning, 88, English zoologist and broadcaster.
- Jon McMurray, 34, Canadian rapper and freeskier, fall.
- P. B. Abdul Razak, 63, Indian politician, MLA (since 2011).
- John Savage, 82, Canadian politician.
- Pedro Luís Guido Scarpa, 93, Italian-born Angolan Roman Catholic prelate, Bishop of Ndalatando (1990–2005).
- José Silva, 93, Portuguese Olympic sailor.
- István Talabos, 62, Hungarian Olympic sports shooter.
- Charles Turbiville, 75, American politician, member of the South Dakota House of Representatives (2005–2013, since 2017), stroke.
- Peter Velappan, 83, Malaysian football administrator and manager (national team).
- C. W. Vrtacek, 65, American musician.
- Yueh Hua, 76, Hong Kong actor (Come Drink with Me, Death Duel, Looking Back in Anger).
- Zheng Xiaosong, 59, Chinese politician and diplomat, Director of the Macau Liaison Office (since 2017), Vice-Governor of Fujian Province, fall.

=== 21 ===
- Earl Bakken, 94, American pacemaker inventor (Medtronic) and museum founder (Bakken Museum).
- Ilie Balaci, 62, Romanian football player (Universitatea Craiova, Dinamo București, national team) and manager, heart attack.
- Seymour Crawford, 74, Irish politician, TD for Cavan–Monaghan (1992–2011).
- Matityahu Drobles, 87, Israeli politician, Knesset member (1972–1977).
- Harry L. Ettlinger, 92, American engineer, member of the Monuments Men, Congressional Gold Medal recipient.
- Robert Faurisson, 89, British-born French academic and Holocaust denier.
- Dee Hartford, 90, American actress.
- John Hill, 68, American football player (New Orleans Saints, New York Giants), pancreatic cancer.
- Idris Legbo Kutigi, 78, Nigerian lawyer, Chief Justice (2007–2009).
- François Montmaneix, 80, French poet and writer.
- Benedetto Vincenzo Nicotra, 85, Italian politician, Deputy (1983–1994).
- Jun-ichi Nishizawa, 92, Japanese electrical engineer.
- Joachim Rønneberg, 99, Norwegian broadcaster (NRK) and military officer (Commander of Operation Gunnerside).
- Harold Stevenson, 89, American painter.
- Tan Chin Nam, 92, Malaysian property developer and racehorse owner.
- Charles Wang, 74, Chinese-born American software developer (CA Technologies), philanthropist (Smile Train) and sports team owner (New York Islanders), lung cancer.
- Eleanor Witcombe, 95, Australian screenwriter (My Brilliant Career, The Getting of Wisdom).

=== 22 ===
- Gilberto Benetton, 77, Italian businessman, co-founder of Benetton Group, pneumonia.
- Frank Branch, 74, Canadian politician, Speaker (1987–1991) and member (1970–1995) of the Legislative Assembly of New Brunswick, cancer.
- Terēzija Broka, 93, Latvian conductor and educator.
- Horacio Cardo, 74, Argentine painter and illustrator.
- Eric Clark, 81, British author and investigative journalist.
- Nikola Čupin, 79, Croatian Olympic rower.
- Anne Fairbairn, 90, Australian poet and journalist.
- Raymond Fraser, 77, Canadian writer.
- Hank Greenwald, 83, American sportscaster (San Francisco Giants).
- Boris Kokorev, 59, Russian pistol shooter, Olympic champion (1996).
- Mahamadou Djeri Maïga, 46, Malian politician and Azawad separatist.
- Sarah Nyendwoha Ntiro, 93, Ugandan educator and activist.
- Friedrich Ostermann, 86, German Roman Catholic prelate, Auxiliary Bishop of Münster (1981–2007).
- Silvio Palmieri, 60, Canadian composer.
- Eugene H. Peterson, 85, American clergyman and biblical scholar.
- Milad Petrušić, 85, Yugoslav Olympic hurdler.
- Alan Raphael, 86, Canadian Olympic field hockey player.
- Robert Saladrigas, 78, Spanish writer, journalist and literary critic.
- Arthur Schnabel, 70, German judoka, Olympic bronze medalist (1984).
- José Varacka, 86, Argentine football player (River Plate, national team) and manager (Boca Juniors).
- Jim Webb, 73, American poet.

=== 23 ===
- Eladio Benítez, 79, Uruguayan footballer (Deportes Temuco, Rangers de Talca, national team).
- Mary Burrows, 86, American politician.
- Lawrence Butler, 61, American basketball player.
- Skip Campbell, 69, American politician, member of the Florida Senate (1996–2006), mayor of Coral Springs, Florida (since 2014).
- Melvin Cohn, 96, American immunologist, co-founder of the Salk Institute.
- Daniel Contet, 74, French tennis player.
- Elyse Dodgson, 73, English theatre producer, heart failure.
- Tony Hoagland, 64, American poet, pancreatic cancer.
- John Hostettler, 93, English author.
- James Karen, 94, American actor (Poltergeist, The Return of the Living Dead, Nixon), cardiorespiratory arrest.
- Nicola Lapenta, 92, Italian politician, MP (1972–1987), President of the Antimafia Commission (1983).
- Mighty Shadow, 77, Trinidadian calypsonian, stroke.
- Francisco Nitsche, 87, Chilean footballer.
- Louis O'Neill, 93, Canadian writer, professor and politician, MNA (1976–1981).
- Rein Põder, 75, Estonian writer and publisher.
- Laurens van Ravens, 96, Dutch football referee.
- Alojz Rebula, 94, Italian-born Slovenian writer, playwright and essayist.
- Todd Reid, 34, Australian tennis player.
- Roberto Renzi, 95, Italian cartoonist (Tiramolla, Akim) and journalist.
- Rod Rust, 90, American football coach (New England Patriots, Montreal Alouettes).
- Max Webb, 101, Polish-born American real estate developer and philanthropist.

=== 24 ===
- Carmen Alborch, 70, Spanish feminist, writer and politician, Minister of Culture (1993–1996), cancer.
- Dame Beryl Beaurepaire, 95, Australian political activist.
- Pat Farrelly, 83, Canadian Olympic athlete.
- Rudolf Gelbard, 87, Austrian Holocaust survivor.
- Anatoly Gladilin, 83, Russian writer.
- Betty Gough, 98, American foreign service officer.
- Patricia Herlihy, 88, American historian.
- Keith Hunter, 66, New Zealand marine and freshwater chemist (University of Otago).
- John D. Lamond, 71, Australian film director (Australia After Dark, Felicity, Breakfast in Paris), complications from Parkinson's disease.
- Na. Muthuswamy, 82, Indian theatre artist and playwright.
- Michael J. O'Connor, 89, American politician, member of the South Dakota House of Representatives (1971–1972) and Senate (1973–1977, 1981–1982).
- Hip Hop Pantsula, 38, South African rapper, suicide by hanging.
- Don Rogers, 90, American politician.
- Pellegrino Tomaso Ronchi, 88, Italian Roman Catholic prelate, Bishop of Porto-Santa Rufina (1984–1985) and Città di Castello (1991–2007).
- Horst Schulze, 97, German actor and opera singer.
- Christine Stix-Hackl, 60, Austrian jurist, Advocate General at the European Court of Justice (2000–2006).
- Billye Talmadge, 88, American activist and educator.
- Galeai Moaaliitele Tuufuli, 81, American Samoan politician, member of the American Samoa Senate (since 2013).
- Benny Valenzuela, 85, Mexican baseball player (St. Louis Cardinals), renal failure.
- Wah Wah Watson, 67, American guitarist (The Funk Brothers).
- Tony Joe White, 75, American singer-songwriter ("Polk Salad Annie", "Rainy Night in Georgia"), heart attack.
- Haider Zaman Khan, 82, Pakistani politician.

=== 25 ===
- Sara Anzanello, 38, Italian volleyball player (national team), leukemia.
- Cheam Channy, 57, Cambodian politician, MP (1998–2005), brain tumour.
- Chen Tiemei, 83, Chinese archaeologist.
- Joyce Crouch, 83, American politician.
- Lindon Crow, 85, American football player (New York Giants, Chicago Cardinals, Los Angeles Rams), stroke.
- Martin Dalby, 76, Scottish composer.
- Sylvia Edwards, 81, American abstract artist.
- Sonny Fortune, 79, American jazz saxophonist, stroke.
- Ruth Gates, 56, British biologist, brain cancer.
- John Taylor Gatto, 82, American author and teacher, heart failure.
- Tyrone Gayle, 30, American political campaign staffer, colon cancer.
- Thomas Keating, 95, American Trappist monk.
- Dorothea Kreß, 94, German Olympic athlete.
- Li Yong, 50, Chinese television host (Lucky 52), cancer.
- Michael Metcalf, 85, British numismatist, heart attack.
- Borislav Pelević, 61, Serbian politician.
- Bradley Roberts, 74, Bahamian politician.
- Norman Sheil, 86, English racing cyclist.
- Shivinder Singh Sidhu, 89, Indian politician, Governor of Meghalaya (2007–2008) and Goa (2008–2011).
- Rodolfo Soracco, 91, Peruvian Olympic basketball player.
- Ulysses S. Washington, 98, American college football player (Virginia State) and coach (Delaware State).
- Elder Roma Wilson, 107, American gospel harmonica player and singer.
- John Ziegler Jr., 84, American ice hockey executive, President of the NHL (1977–1992).

=== 26 ===
- Marc Francina, 70, French politician, Deputy (2007–2017), Mayor of Évian-les-Bains (since 2014).
- Ana González de Recabarren, 93, Chilean human rights activist.
- Warren B. Hamilton, 93, American geologist.
- Nikolai Karachentsov, 73, Russian actor (Juno and Avos, The Dog in the Manger, A Man from the Boulevard des Capucines), People's Artist of the RSFSR (1989), kidney failure.
- György Károly, 65, Hungarian poet and writer, brain tumor.
- Bernard Kester, 90, American artist.
- Zenon Mazurkevich, 79, Ukrainian-born American architect, head injury sustained in fall.
- Kiyoko Miki, 99, Japanese politician.
- Valentin Masengo Mkinda, 77, Congolese Roman Catholic prelate, Bishop of Kabinda (since 1995).
- Russ Mobley, 84, American politician, member of the Kentucky General Assembly (2001–2009).
- Richard Murunga, 65, Kenyan boxer, Olympic bronze medalist (1972).
- Gene Sykes, 76, American football player (Buffalo Bills, Denver Broncos).
- Risto Talosela, 93, Finnish Olympic wrestler.
- Phillip H. Wiebe, 73, Canadian philosopher, cancer.

=== 27 ===
- Yū Asagiri, 62, Japanese manga artist (Golden Cain), pneumonia.
- Martin Badoian, 90, American mathematician.
- Angela Bianchini, 97, Italian author and literary critic.
- Richard L. Bloch, 89, American businessman and sports team owner (Phoenix Suns).
- Daniel Correa Freitas, 24, Brazilian footballer (Botafogo, São Paulo), stabbed.
- Perry Lee Dunn, 77, American football player (Atlanta Falcons, Ole Miss Rebels, Dallas Cowboys).
- Kyoko Enami, 76, Japanese actress (Gamera vs. Barugon), pulmonary emphysema.
- Enrique Granados, 84, Spanish Olympic swimmer (1952).
- Freddie Hart, 91, American country musician and songwriter ("Easy Loving", "My Hang-Up Is You", "Got the All Overs for You (All Over Me)"), pneumonia.
- Fred Hess, 74, American tenor saxophonist.
- Sibtain Kassamali, 55, Kenyan cricketer.
- Murray Khouri, 77, New Zealand-Australian clarinetist, complications of heart surgery.
- Madan Lal Khurana, 82, Indian politician, Chief Minister of Delhi (1993–1996), Governor of Rajasthan (2004).
- James Bruce Lockhart, 77, British diplomat and intelligence officer.
- Denis Miéville, 72, Swiss mathematician and philosopher.
- Antônio Possamai, 89, Brazilian Roman Catholic prelate, Bishop of Ji-Paraná (1983–2007).
- Herb Remington, 92, American lap steel guitarist.
- William Salmon, 90, Australian painter.
- Mario Segale, 84, American real estate developer, namesake of Nintendo's Mario.
- Ntozake Shange, 70, American poet and playwright (For Colored Girls Who Have Considered Suicide / When the Rainbow Is Enuf).
- Vichai Srivaddhanaprabha, 60, Thai duty-free retailer (King Power) and football club owner (Leicester City), helicopter crash.
- Yang Ziyuan, 90, Chinese politician, Mayor of Guangzhou (1988–1990).
- Todd Youth, 47, American punk and metal guitarist (Warzone, Murphy's Law, Danzig).

=== 28 ===
- Anthony Anenih, 85, Nigerian politician, Minister of Works and Housing (1999–2003).
- Mick Archer, 75, Irish hurler (St. Finbarr's) and Gaelic footballer (Cork).
- Colm Christle, 84–85, Irish cyclist.
- Luis Miguel Enciso Recio, 88, Spanish historian and politician, Senator (1977–1982).
- Peter Everwine, 88, American poet.
- David Fieldhouse, 93, English historian of the British Empire.
- Priscilla Galloway, 88, Canadian author.
- Philippe Gildas, 82, French television and radio presenter.
- Richard Gill, 76, Australian conductor, colorectal and peritoneal cancer.
- I. John Hesselink, 90, American theologian.
- Konstantīns Konstantinovs, 40, Latvian powerlifter.
- Eldridge M. Moores, 80, American geologist.
- Vera Micaelsen, 43, Norwegian journalist and author, cervical cancer.
- Erno Polgar, 64, Hungarian writer, heart attack.
- Barbara Ronson, 75, British politician.
- Colin Sylvia, 32, Australian footballer (Melbourne, Fremantle), traffic collision.
- Del Thachuk, 82, Canadian football player (Edmonton Eskimos).
- Bill Trumbo, 79, American college basketball coach, complications from Alzheimer's disease.
- Don S. Williams, 80, Canadian actor (The X-Files, Reindeer Games) and television producer (The Beachcombers).

=== 29 ===
- Germán Aceros, 80, Colombian football player (national team) and manager.
- William F. Bernhard, 93, American cardiovascular surgeon, pneumonia.
- Gérald Bloncourt, 91, Haitian painter and photographer.
- Tom Boutis, 96, American artist.
- Peter Brace, 94, British actor and stuntman (Raiders of the Lost Ark, Batman, Highlander).
- Bernard Bragg, 90, American actor, co-founder of the National Theatre of the Deaf.
- Sir Nigel Broomfield, 81, British diplomat, Ambassador to Germany (1993–1997).
- Klaas Bruinsma, 87, Dutch translator.
- Herbert Doussant, 87, American operatic tenor.
- Dave Duncan, 85, Scottish-born Canadian fantasy and science fiction author (West of January, The Cutting Edge), brain hemorrhage.
- Jimmy Farrar, 67, American rock singer (Molly Hatchet, Gator Country), heart attack.
- Franco Franchi, 95, Italian racing cyclist.
- Jason Franci, 75, American football player (Denver Broncos).
- Lodi Gyari, 69, Tibetan diplomat, liver cancer.
- Peter Hawes, 71, New Zealand playwright and author.
- Werner Holzer, 81, American Olympic wrestler.
- Mariama Keïta, 72, Nigerien journalist and feminist activist.
- June Kerr, 86, English-born New Zealand ballerina.
- Li Xifan, 90, Chinese literary scholar and redologist.
- Andrea Manfredi, 26, Italian racing cyclist, plane crash.
- M. S. Rajashekar, 75, Indian film director (Dhruva Thare, Hrudaya Hrudaya, Dakota Express), lung infection.
- John Roselius, 74, American actor (This Is Your Brain on Drugs, Con Air, JAG).
- Larry Snyder, 76, American jockey, cancer.
- Theodore W. Thorson, 96, American politician.
- Tuti Tursilawati, 34, Indonesian housekeeper and killer, executed by beheading.
- Wang Guangying, 99, Chinese entrepreneur and politician, founder of China Everbright Group, Vice-Chairman of the National People's Congress.
- Young Greatness, 34, American rapper ("Moolah"), shot.

=== 30 ===
- David Azulai, 64, Israeli politician, Minister of Religious Services (since 2015), member of the Knesset (1996–2018), cancer.
- Tom Braatz, 85, American football player (Washington Redskins, Dallas Cowboys, Los Angeles Rams).
- Whitey Bulger, 89, American gangster (Winter Hill Gang) and convicted murderer, beaten.
- Heinz Otto Cordes, 93, German-born American mathematician.
- Yashwant Dev, 91, Indian poet and composer, pneumonia.
- Bill Fischer, 88, American baseball player (Chicago White Sox, Washington Senators, Kansas City Athletics).
- María Irene Fornés, 88, Cuban-American playwright (Sarita, Fefu and Her Friends).
- Hardy Fox, 73, American composer and musician (The Residents).
- Jin Yong, 94, Hong Kong novelist (Demi-Gods and Semi-Devils), essayist and newspaper proprietor (Ming Pao).
- Rae Ann Kelsch, 58, American politician, member of the North Dakota House of Representatives (1991–2012), bacterial infection.
- Tadeusz Kraus, 86, Czech football player (Sparta Prague, national team) and manager (Aris Limassol).
- Frank Litsky, 92, American sports columnist (The New York Times).
- Erika Mahringer, 93, Austrian alpine skier, double Olympic bronze medalist (1948).
- Beverly McClellan, 49, American singer and reality talent show finalist (The Voice), endometrial cancer.
- Emil Paleček, 88, Czech chemist, discovered nucleic acids electrochemistry.
- Rico J. Puno, 65, Filipino pop singer, heart failure.
- Sangharakshita, 93, British Buddhist teacher and writer, founder of the Triratna Buddhist Community, pneumonia and sepsis.
- Set Them Free, 28, American racehorse.
- Götz Schulze, 54, German jurist and judge, heart attack.
- Bob Skoronski, 84, American football player (Green Bay Packers), complications from Alzheimer's disease.
- Jerry O. Tuttle, 83, American vice admiral.
- Steven L. Zinter, 68, American judge (South Dakota Supreme Court), complications from surgery.
- Edward Zuber, 86, Canadian artist.

=== 31 ===
- Enzo Apicella, 96, Italian cartoonist and designer.
- Preston Bynum, 79, American politician, member of the Arkansas House of Representatives (1969–1980), heart failure.
- Chen Chuangtian, 81, Chinese materials scientist (Academy of Sciences), discovered BBO and LBO.
- Louise DeSalvo, 76, American writer and literary scholar, breast cancer.
- Colin Edwynn, 85, British actor (Coronation Street, Emmerdale).
- Sir Thomas Eichelbaum, 87, German-born New Zealand jurist, Chief Justice (1989–1999).
- Esquerdinha, 46, Brazilian footballer (Vitória, FC Porto, Real Zaragoza), heart attack.
- Johnny Graham, 73, Scottish footballer (Falkirk, Hibernian, Ayr United).
- Hou Fusheng, 94, Chinese petroleum engineer, member of the Chinese Academy of Engineering.
- Yammie Lam, 55, Hong Kong actress (Witch from Nepal, The Greed of Man, Looking Back in Anger).
- Kenny Marks, 67, American Christian music singer, heart attack.
- George Mastics, 86, American politician.
- Willie McCovey, 80, American Hall of Fame baseball player (San Francisco Giants, Oakland Athletics, San Diego Padres), infection.
- Dana G. Mead, 82, American businessman.
- Jack Patera, 85, American football player (Dallas Cowboys, Chicago Cardinals) and coach (Seattle Seahawks), pancreatic cancer.
- Teodoro Petkoff, 86, Venezuelan journalist and politician, Minister of the Central Office of Coordination and Planning (1996–1999).
- Hamdi Qandil, 82, Egyptian journalist.
- Ken Shellito, 78, English football player (Chelsea) and manager.
- Roger Bootle-Wilbraham, 7th Baron Skelmersdale, 73, British politician, member of the House of Lords (since 1974).
- Mariasilvia Spolato, 83, Italian academic, LGBT activist and author, complications from a stroke.
- Tony Streather, 92, British army officer and mountaineer.
- Wolfgang Zuckermann, 96, German-born American harpsichord maker and sustainability activist.
