= Paris Underground =

Paris Underground may refer to:

- Paris Metro, the rail network of Paris
- The Parisian branch of the French Resistance during the Second World War
- Paris Underground (book), 1943 memoir by Etta Shiber
- Paris Underground (film), a 1945 war film starring Constance Bennett and Gracie Fields
- Paris Underground: The Maps, Stations, and Design of the Metro, a book by Mark Ovenden
- Sous-Sols de Paris (Paris Underground), a documentary film by Gordon Matta-Clark
- Paris Underground, the pseudonymous author of a 1978 mathematics paper concerning Fleischner's theorem
- Paris Underground, a musical group whose members included Colm Farrelly
- Mines of Paris, a 280km network of abandoned mines under the city of Paris
- Catacombs of Paris, an ossuary in part of the Mines of Paris
