= Juan Heredia =

Juan Heredia is the name of:

- Juan Carlos Heredia (born 1952), Argentine-Spanish footballer
- Juan Francisco Heredia (born 1989), Spanish footballer
- Juan Heredia Moreno (1942–2018), Spanish footballer
