= Scandrett =

Scandrett is a surname and occasional given name. Notable people with this name include:

- Devarick Scandrett (1984–2018), American football player
- Harry Scandrett (1892–1977), British flying ace
- John Scandrett (1915–2006), New Zealand cricketer
- Stephen Scandrett (1631?–1706), English nonconformist minister
- William Benjamin Scandrett (1840–1917), British-born mayor of Invercargill, New Zealand
- John Scandrett Harford (1785–1866), British banker, benefactor and abolitionist

== See also ==
- Scandrett Regional Park, near Auckland, New Zealand, named after the Scandrett family
