= Siebler =

Siebler is a surname of South German origin. Notable people with the surname include:

- Dwight Siebler (1937–2021), American baseball player
- Engelbert Siebler (1937–2018), German Roman Catholic bishop
- Michael Siebler (born 1956), German journalist and classical archaeologist
