= Castellazzi =

Castellazzi is an Italian surname. Notable people with the surname include:

- Armando Castellazzi (1904–1968), Italian footballer
- Luca Castellazzi (born 1975), Italian footballer
- Mario Castellazzi (1935–2018), Italian footballer
- Paolo Castellazzi (born 1987), Italian footballer
