= Hotel Beacon =

Building in Manhattan, New York

The Hotel Beacon
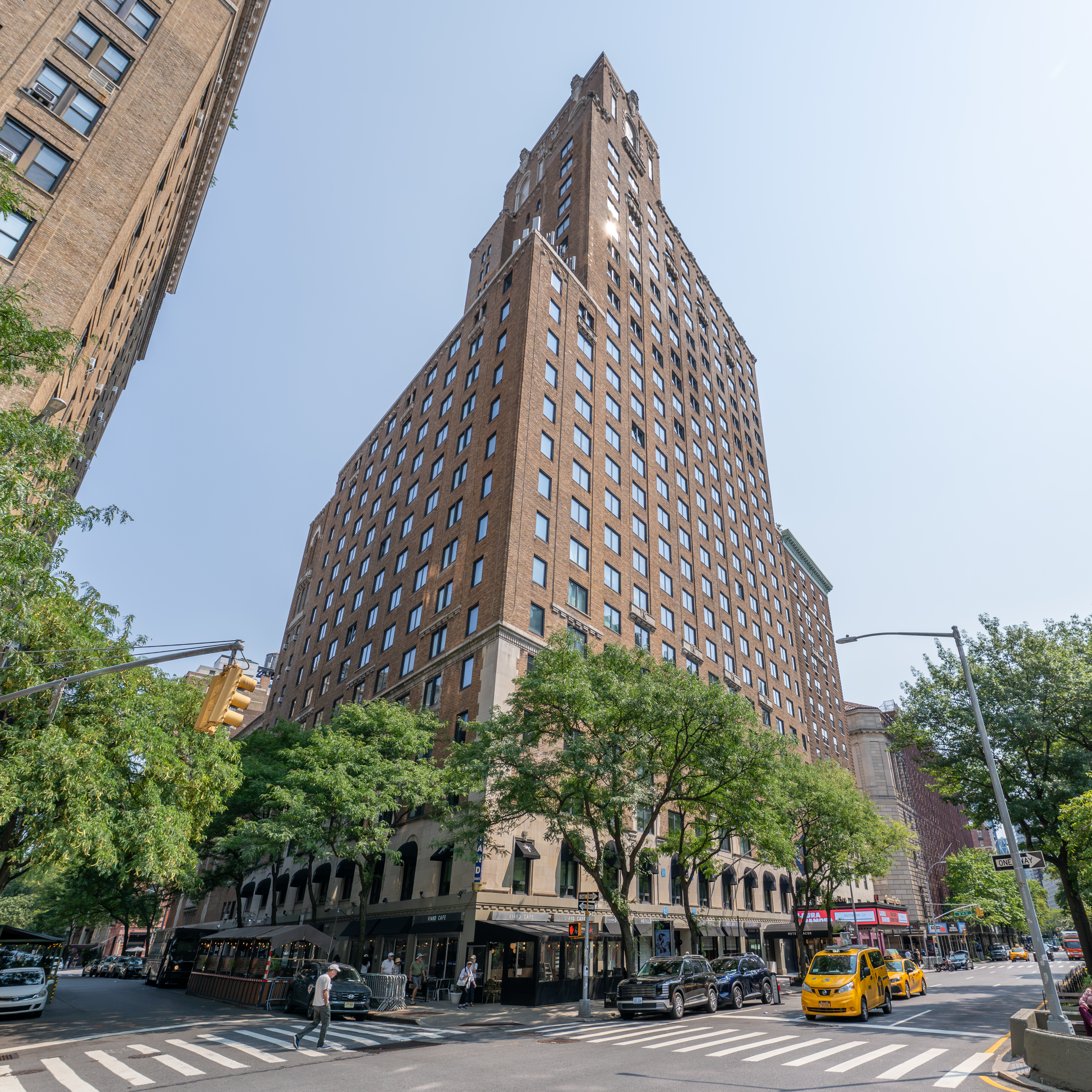
- The Hotel Beacon (2026)

General information
- Status: Open
- Type: Hotel
- Location: 2130 Broadway; New York, NY 10023; United States
- Coordinates: 40.7806402°N 73.9810592°W
- Construction started: 1928
- Completed: 1928
- Opening: November 1928
- Cost: $8,000,000

Design and construction
- Architect: Walter W. Ahlschlager
- Main contractor: Havemeyer Construction Co.

The Hotel Beacon is a Beaux-Arts, 24-story building on the Upper West Side of Manhattan in New York City, designed by Walter W. Ahlschlager. It was built in 1928 at 2130 Broadway, at the corner with 75th Street, on the site of the Tilden Club House and the Dakota Stables.

At the time of its opening, apartments could be leased unfurnished with maid service or furnished with full hotel service. They featured one, two or three bedrooms, each with bath and kitchenette. Kitchenette were described as 'almost' kitchen size and equipped with silent electric refrigeration. The hotel featured a gymnasium, rooftop gardens on the setbacks, the Cafe of the Beacon in the lobby, located back then on the second floor mezzanine, that could seat 250 and the Restaurant Grill in the basement seating 200. Also in the basement was a barber shop and a beauty salon.

As of 2017, the hotel features 278 transient hotel rooms but still hosts a few permanent tenants.

== Development and construction (1927–1928) ==
On January 24, 1927, the Havemeyer Construction Company headed by J. Henry Small, purchased from the Chanin Construction Company the plot of ground on the south side of 75th Street between Broadway and Amsterdam Avenue with the intention of erecting a building that will be a combination of hotel and theater at the cost of eight million dollars. The building was to be 23 stories high and the Beacon Theatre was to have a capacity of 4,000. Havemeyer Construction Co. promptly issued a press release. The Hotel Midway, now 24 stories high, would be fireproof, featuring every modern improvement such as serving pantries, electric refrigeration, baths and showers, and would tower over all the immediate structures in the neighborhood including the Ansonia.

Construction was underway when J. Henry Small falls for the short lived "beacon craze" sweeping through the city. An airway beacon and a penthouse with illuminated panels was to be placed on top of the Midway Hotel and the name was changed to Midway Beacon Hotel, a name that would be kept through construction as late as June 1928. The Hotel St. George in Brooklyn which opened in February of that year and the Hotel McAlpin in Manhattan already had beacons in operation.

When the hotel was christened on July 12, 1928, Midway was dropped from the name and it was now the Hotel Beacon.

== The Airway Beacon (1928–1931) ==
Built by the Sperry Gyroscope Company and installed on a high steel tower on the roof, the five foot in diameter, 1.2 billion candles in power, airway beacon is officially lit by Clarence D. Chamberlin, transatlantic flier and the city's airport engineer, at 10 pm on July 12, 1928 to christen the building.

In an elaborate ceremony, Lieutenant Orville Stephens from the Army Reserve Air Corps flies a plane in a storm, above New York City harbor and lower Brooklyn to Flatbush, then passing directly over the light, while Chamberlin is giving the dedicatory address. The plane had taken off from Roosevelt Field on Long Island, which became famous in 1927 as the starting point for Charles Lindbergh's solo transatlantic flight. Stephens reported that the light could be seen at a reasonable height while Chamberlain praised the light and said it would be of great value for mail fliers who pass near New York City on their routes. A somewhat ironic statement since he was quoted just 5 days earlier in the Brooklyn Daily Eagle saying he had not heard of any flier who found the St. George beacon (another city hotel with a beacon) useful in night flying, adding 'I haven't done any night flying abound New York myself recently'. The Assistant Manager of the St. George was at least honest enough to say 'a couple of fliers recently flew from Boston using our beacon all the way, but of course it's for the advertising'

The Beacon itself will be dedicated in a separate ceremony August 1, 1929. It was said to be the largest candle-powered light in the world at the time, which light could be seen on clear nights as far as seventy miles away by planes and visible on the ground as far as twenty-five miles from the hotel.

On February 25, 1931, the lighthouse division of the Department of Commerce has ruled that only actual airway beacons could use white light. Experiments are conducted with colored lenses but prove unfeasible. The beacons on top of the McAlpin, the St. George and the Beacon went dark, never to be lit again.

== Early years (1928–1933) ==
Following the christening of the building in July 1928 and under the leadership of its first General Manager, Gus Schult, leasing at the Hotel Beacon seems to be off to an auspicious start. On August 26, J. Henry Small was quoted saying "We have been somewhat surprised at the rental Interest shown during the hot weather of this month when people are supposedly away from town and not interested in actually signing leases. Even on sweltering days we rented as many as six apartments a day and when the weather was cooler we ran as high as 10."

Gus Schult was an experienced professional, a native of Sweden, and he managed the Hermitage Hotel only to become the resident Manager of Reisenweber's. He then purchased the Ben Hur Restaurant on City Island, which he operated for several years before going back to the hotel business as Manager of the Beacon.

April 4, 1930: The Chanin Realty Company who had sold the land of the Beacon to J. Henry Small in 1927 buys the Hotel Beacon from the Beacon & Midway Corporation Presided by John L. Lann.

== Notable tenants ==
- A.H. Woods: Broadway producer
- Aristodimos Kaldis: Figurative painter
- Richard Dey de Ribcowsky: American artist born in Bulgaria, famous for his paintings of "Old Ironsides"
- Gerard Alessandrini: American playwright, parodist, actor and theatre director, creator of Forbidden Broadway
- Grete Stückgold: Soprano Opera singer
- Herbert Doussant: Tenor Opera Singer
- Gusti Brandt: Philanthropist
- Bertha Vorzimer: Dress designer who introduced many Paris fashions to New York
- Etta Shiber: Best selling writer, author of 'Paris Underground'
- Francis Miller: American painter and illustrator. Painted several covers of the Saturday Evening Post
- Nathaniel Edward Reeid: Ayn Rand's editor.
- David Holdgreiwe: Broadway choreographer and author

== General managers ==
- Gus Schult (1928–1933)
- Harry G. Yurdin (1933–1945)
- John Newton (1945–1947)
- Harry G. Yurdin (1947–1953)
- Oscar Wintrab (1953–1963)
- A. David Alpert (1976–1987)
- Elizabeth Dashiff (1987–1990)
- Thomas J. Travers (1990–2020)
