= Beacon Hotel =

Beacon Hotel may refer to:

- Beacon Hotel, in Sandyford, Dublin
- Hotel Beacon on the Upper West Side of Manhattan
