= Morseth =

Brand of knife

The Morseth brand of knives was founded by Harry Morseth, a native of Norway who immigrated to the United States at age 17. After his death his grandson, Steve Morseth continued making knives under the Morseth name. AG Russell bought the rights to the name and the equipment in 1971.

== Harry Morseth ==
Harry Morseth (1889-1967) began making knives in 1936 in Everett, Washington. Morseth primarily used A2 steel and for the most part made hunting knives. After a trip to Norway in 1938, Morseth stopped using A2 planer blades, and began importing Brusletto laminated blades. He ground the bevel of these blades to provide the desired edge and attached his own custom-made handles. In 1953 he patented the "Safe-lok" sheath system and in 1956 moved the factory to Clinton, Washington.

== Steve Morseth ==
After his death in 1967, Morseth's work was carried on by his grandson, Steve Morseth, who had been making knives since 1961 at the factory. The younger Morseth continued the business until December 1971, when he sold the equipment, supplies, and brand name "Morseth" to A. G. Russell of Springdale, Arkansas; Russell sold the majority of these as kits, for collectors and beginning knifemakers to assemble themselves. Steve Morseth relocated to Redmond, Washington and made knives marked "S. Morseth" until his death in 1995.
