= École secondaire Gaétan-Gervais =

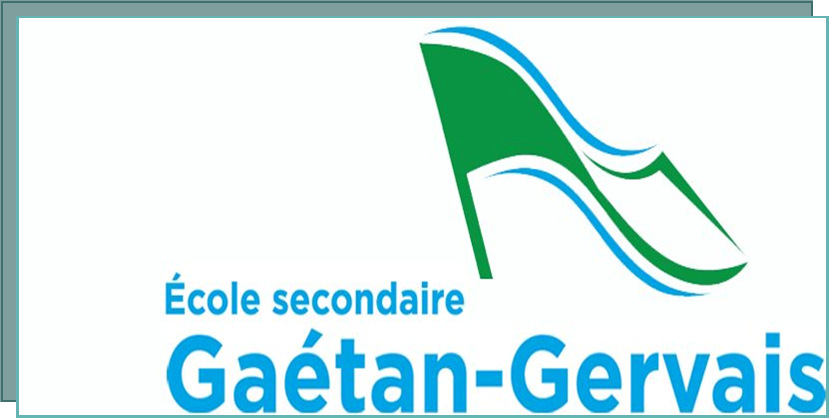

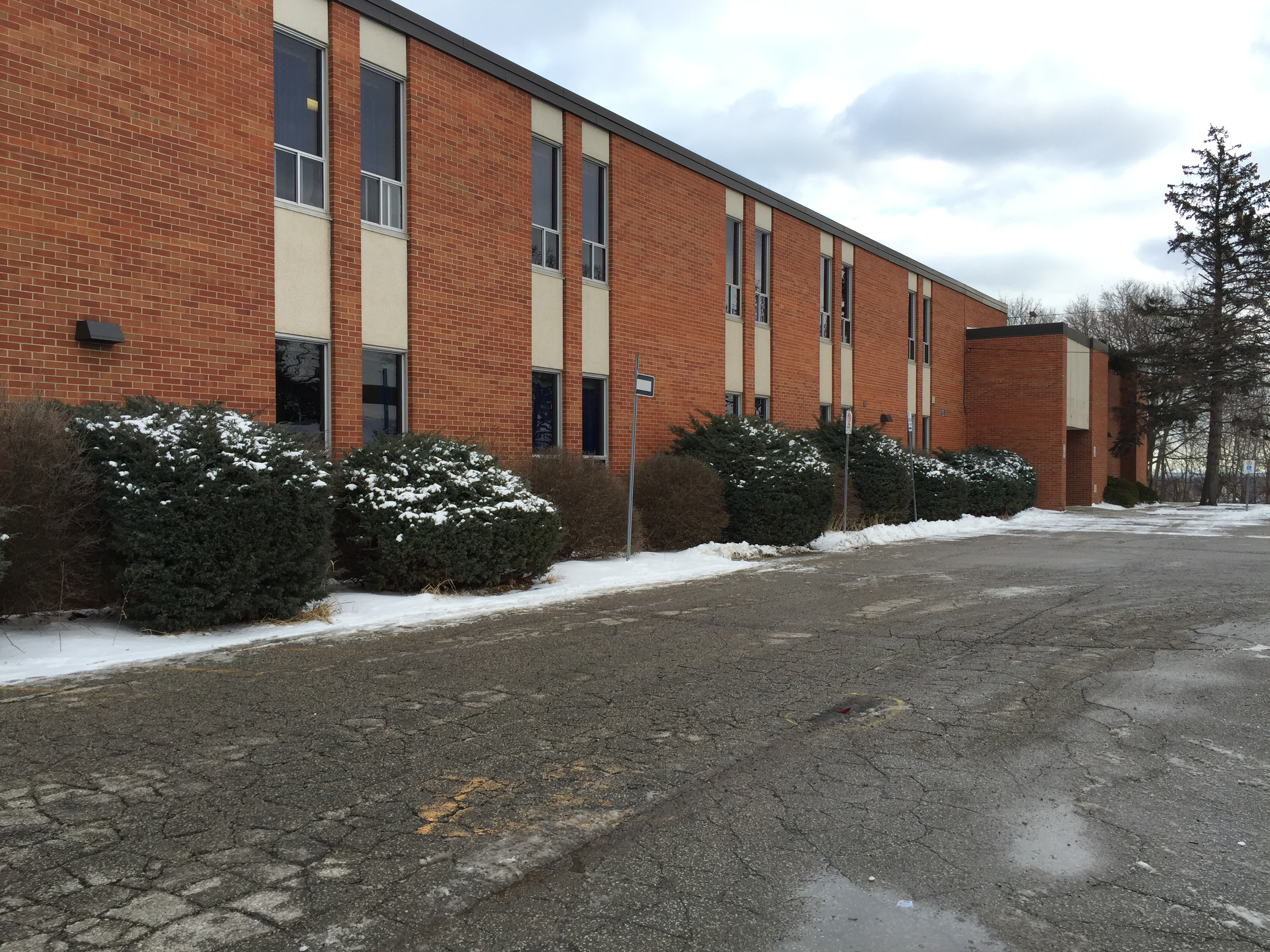

Location
- 150 promenade Ridge; Oakville, Ontario, L6H 1B8; Canada; 43.460608°N 79.693413°W

Information
- School type: Public High school
- Opened: 2011
- School board: Conseil scolaire Viamonde
- Principal: Josée Landriault
- Grades: 7-12
- Enrollment: 135 (2015–16)
- Language: French
- Colours: Green and White
- Affiliation: Conseil scolaire Viamonde (public et laïc)
- Website: gaetangervais.csviamonde.ca

École secondaire Gaétan-Gervais, previously known as École secondaire Oakville, is a French language high school in Oakville, Ontario, Canada. It was the town's first French language high school. This school is one of 47 schools in the Conseil Scolaire Viamonde school board.

== History ==
École secondaire Gaétan-Gervais opened its door to 75 students on 6 September 2011 under the temporary name of École secondaire Oakville. It was on 24 February 2012, during the official celebration of the school's 1 year anniversary, that the winning name of the school naming student vote was announced : École secondaire Gaétan-Gervais. The school was named after one of the men who created the Franco-Ontarian flag, Gaétan Gervais.

The school is temporarily sharing a building with École élémentaire du Chêne. The secondary school students have requested more suitable amenities and a new building numerous times since its establishment. On 30 October 2015, M.P.P. Kevin Flynn, announced the construction of a new building at McCraney street East. The new building will be open for the 2017–2018 school year.

== Feeder schools ==
- École élémentaire du Chêne, which shares a building with École secondaire Gaétan-Gervais
- École élémentaire Patricia-Picknell in Oakville (1257 Sedgewick crescent)
- École élémentaire Horizon Jeunesse in Mississauga (1445 Lewisham drive)

== School zone ==
The school welcomes students from Oakville and Mississauga

== Extracurricular activities ==
The following École secondaire Gaétan-Gervais sports teams are a part of the Halton Secondary School Athletic Association (HSSAA):

- Guys and Girls Senior and Junior soccer teams
- Guys and Girls Senior and Junior basketball teams
- Guys and Girls Senior and Junior volleyball teams
- Guys and Girls Senior and Junior hockey teams

Since 2013, the students have had the opportunity to participate in La Grande Traversée (LGT), a cycling relay from Montreal, Quebec to Vancouver, B.C.

École secondaire Gaétan-Gervais also has many clubs:

- Improv Club
- DJ Club
- Gay-Straight Alliance
- The Eco-Griffons
- Yearbook Club
- Mathematics Club
- Chess Club
- Humanitarian Club

== Available programs ==
Since September 2014,École secondaire Gaétan-Gervais offered the Baccalauréat International diploma to its 11th and 12th grade students.

The school also offers the Specialist High Skills Major (SHMS) program in sports to its 11th and 12th grade students. The goal of this program is to teach students indispensable skills needed to succeed in the world of sports, sport management and sports medicine thanks to workshops, certifications, and local sports competitions.

== School trips ==
In 2013, eleven 9th and 10th grade students had the chance to participate in an international trip to Europe as part of their history class. They visited the Netherlands, Belgium, France, and Germany. They got to see many historical European cities: Amsterdam, Berlin, Ypres, Paris, Normandy, Dieppe, Vimy, etc.

In May 2015, the students of the 8th grade went to Camp Muskoka in Ontario to develop their leadership skills. They participated in many activities including soccer, hiking, and a camp fire.

== Technology ==
École secondaire Gaétan-Gervais has many technologies to assist students :

- Laptops
- Computer Lab
- electronic tablets (Apple iPad, Microsoft Surface)
- Interactive white boards (SMART boards)

== Provincial test results ==
Four cohorts (2012, 2013, 2014, 2015) have passed the Ontario Secondary School Literacy Test (OSSLT) with a 100% passing rate.
