= Ficlets =

Defunct flash fiction website

- Screenshot of Ficlets.com as of 15 December 2008
- Website type: Flash fiction literature website
- Dissolved: 15 January 2009
- Owner: AOL
- Creator: Kevin Lawver
- Website: ficlets.com
- Commercial: No
- Registration: Optional
- Launched: 31 October 2006
- Current status: Offline

Ficlets was a non-commercial AOL community website dedicated to publishing and archiving ficlets, which are similar to flash fiction. It was founded on 31 October 2006 by Kevin Lawver, although it did not become fully operational until early to mid-March 2007. On 6 June 2008, Lawver severed his employment from AOL and, in turn, departed as system administrator for Ficlets. No new administrator was announced to replace Lawver, leaving the respective duties for the site unmaintained.

On 2 December 2008, it was announced on the People Connection Blog that Ficlets would permanently be closed, as of 15 January 2009. On 6 December 2008, a banner was placed at the header of Ficlets pages that announced the closure of the site and a pop-up window was added to the main page that read "Ficlets is going away soon :(". Lawver attempted to save the site to no avail, so he began a "Ficlets Graveyard" to archive all the ficlets written prior to the closing of the site.

Lawver announced on 10 January 2009 that, with the help of Ficlets.com programmer Jason Garber and design team Viget Labs, a replacement site entitled Ficly.com would be launched. At the time of the announcement, the Ficly front page consisted of a logo (subtitling the format "A better, shorter story"), a statement of not being active yet, and a form to sign up an e-mail address for notification of the official launch. Lawver stated that the Ficly.com team is "slowly making progress" in constructing the site, referencing the possible launch date as "maybe by ficlets' 2nd birthday at the beginning of March".

All content on ficlets.com was licensed under the Creative Commons Attribution-Share Alike 2.5 license and viewable to any patron of the site. Users who completed the free registration process could submit their own ficlets (either completely original, inspired by a Creative Commons-licensed Flickr image, or as a prequel or sequel to another's ficlet), host a draft of a ficlet in progress which was not viewable by others, maintain a user profile, comment on and rate other's stories, contact other users via private messages, and maintain a list of favorite ficlet authors and stories. There was also a Ficlets blog wherein Lawver and science fiction author John Scalzi posted entries in an assortment of categories, including Book Tour Diaries, a Ficlets Spotlight, and interviews with published authors. For registration, the site accepted OpenID and AOL/AIM screen names.

== Creation ==
The site was created in late 2006 by AOL system architect and lead developer Kevin Lawver, who handled the back end website programming, as a repository for ficlets. The concept for the site originated with Lawver being a "frustrated writer", unable to find the time to complete a fictional work; as an alternative, he conceived ficlets – a format that allowed a work to be written in "five or ten minutes at work during lunch or [during] a break" and the site was to provide "inspiration" via "pictures, phrases or other stories" as well as circumventing, through the prequel or sequel option, having "to start from scratch when I had time to write". The name of the site and fiction form were derived from a unison of words: fiction and chiclets, specifically the "lets" part of the later meant to indicate "a small version of".

An additional four-person AOL developer team provided time and effort in the creation of the website:

- Jason Garber, who handled the front end website programming.
- Ari Kushimoto, who assisted with the user interface design and programming.
- Cindy Li, who assisted with the user interface design and programming as well as aiding in the promotion of the site.
- Jenna Marino, who handled the website and logo design.

Science fiction author John Scalzi was a principal contributor to the site from its launch as a blogger, though he departed that position at the end of 2007.

== Content ==
The site hosted "ficlets", not strictly linear very short stories between 64- and 1,024-bytes in length. Ficlets are modular in that each is intended, but not required, to be a stand-alone story but once posted any registered user could continue the narrative thread by writing an indefinite number of prequels or sequels to the ficlet. All ficlets are licensed under the Creative Commons Attribution-Share Alike 2.5 License.

Mature Content was allowed within ficlet stories, but explicit pornography, obscenity and "hate speech" were banned. Ficlet stories with mature content were required to be designated as such, thus allowing only registered users who opted to view mature content the ability to read the stories. The use of the intellectual property of others, such as fan fiction allow, was likewise banned from Ficlets. The use of real people was also forbidden in ficlet stories, unless they were public figures, although slanderous or libelous remarks directed at those public figures were prohibited.

As of 4 January 2009, the site hosted almost 49,000 ficlet stories, over 80,000 comments on those stories, and had in excess of 10,000 registered members.

=== Notable contributors ===
Several published authors, aside from blog contributor and science fiction author John Scalzi, participated on the site with original content. These included:

- Science fiction and fantasy author Rachel Swirsky, who contributed four pieces (entitled: "Whistbone's Chase", "DNA Designs", "My Way Out", and "Falling Further In").
- Science fiction author Brian Francis Slattery, who contributed three pieces (entitled: "Asbestos", "Invisible Wars", and "Telescope")
- Star Trek acting alumni Wil Wheaton, who contributed nine pieces (entitled: "The Fifteenth", "They Don't Come Out at Night", "Nevermore", "Snowfall", "A Godawful Small Affair", "Wallace", "Real Life", "An Unremarkable Factory", and "Hunter and Hunted").

== Awards ==
In 2008, Ficlets was a Gold Award Winner in the category of Social/Networking from W3 Awards.

In March 2008, Ficlets won the CSS category and was nominated for the Community category of the SxSW Web Awards.

== Critical reception ==
Within the site's first week of operation it had received nearly 400 blog posts regarding it, including a solicitation for new users from Boing Boing. Mike Linksvayer of Creative Commons was particularly "excited" with the creation and usage of the site. On 6 and 9 February 2008, the CBC Radio show Spark ran a profile on Ficlets, including an interview with Kevin Lawver and the reading of two ficlets from the site.
