= Ken Rickards (footballer) =

English footballer (1929–2018)

Personal information
- Full name: Kenneth Rickards
- Date of birth: 22 March 1929
- Place of birth: Middlesbrough, England
- Date of death: 7 October 2018 (aged 89)
- Place of death: Middlesbrough, England
- Position: Midfielder

Youth career
- 1943–1945: Middlesbrough Wesley
- 1946–1947: Middlesbrough Park

Senior career*
Years	Team	Apps	(Gls)
1947–1950	Hull City	0	(0)
1950	Darlington	8	(0)
–	Stockton		
- * Club domestic league appearances and goals

Kenneth Rickards (22 March 1929 – 7 October 2018) was an English footballer who played as an inside forward in the Football League for Darlington, in non-league football for Stockton, and was on the books of Hull City without playing first-team football. He played youth football for teams in his native Middlesbrough, and represented the North Riding of Yorkshire in the English Counties (16–18) League.
