= A. G. Russell =

American knife maker (1933–2018)

- Born: August 27, 1933; Eudora, Arkansas, U.S.
- Died: October 12, 2018 (aged 85)
- Occupation(s): Knifemaker, CEO
- Spouse: Goldie Russell
- Awards: Blade Cutlery Hall of Fame

A. G. Russell (August 27, 1933 – October 12, 2018) was an American knife maker.

He was born in Eudora, Arkansas where his great-grandfather taught him how to make knives when he was nine. Russell went on to make knives as a hobby and profession. In 1964, Russell switched his focus to selling Arkansas whetstones and a year later began selling knives. In 1968 he started the first forum for selling aftermarket knives, the A. G. Russell List of Knives for Immediate Delivery, which later became The Cutting Edge. His mailing list was used as a basis for the first two knife magazines, Knife World, and The American Blade, now known as Blade. In 1970 he co-founded the Knife Collectors Club and the Knifemakers' Guild, both of which are the oldest continuously functioning organizations of their types.

Russell was the first member of the Knife Digest Cutlery Hall of Fame and produced the first commemorative pocket knife. Russell designed and produced the first linerless pocket knife with all-plastic handles in 1970. In 1975, he designed a unique boot knife he called the "Sting", a small knife intended for hunting and personal defense. In 1987, he introduced the "A. G. Russell One Hand Knife" which was one of the first production knives to use a blade thumbstud for one-handed opening. In 1988 he was inducted into the Blade Magazine Cutlery Hall of Fame.

== A. G. Russell Knives ==
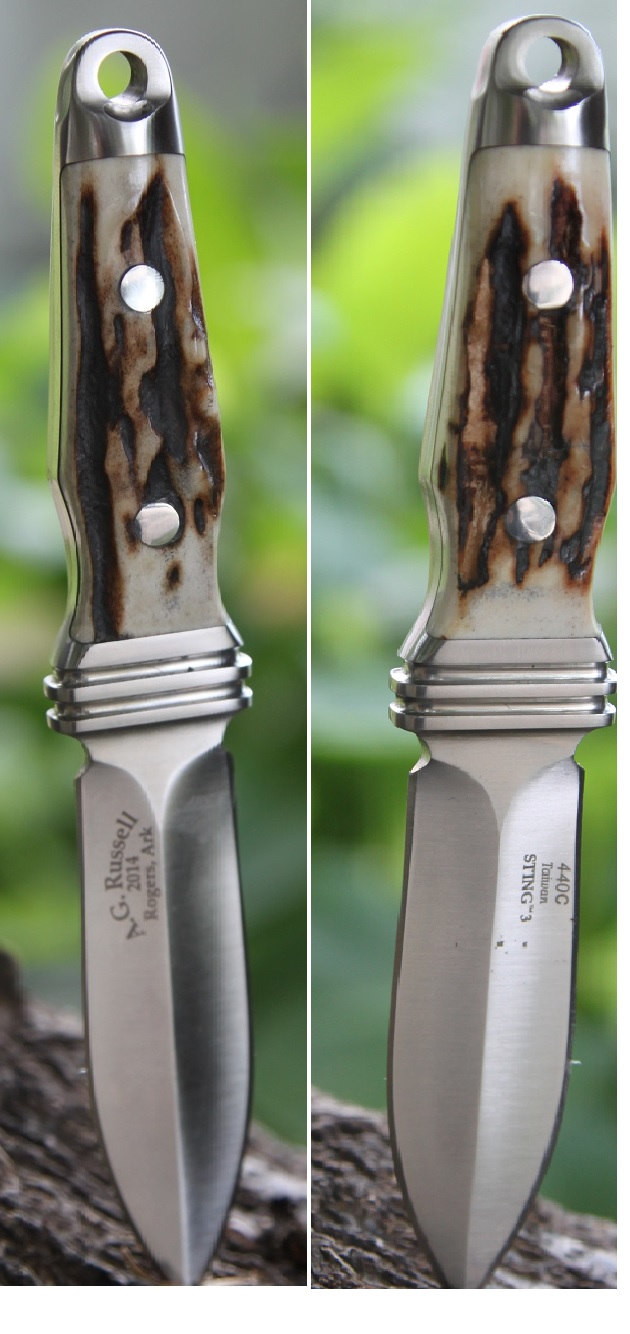
A. G. Russell third variant of the Sting boot knife

In 1964 Russell founded "A. G. Russell Knives", the largest reseller of aftermarket knives. The company began selling Arkansas Whetstones and moved on to sell Randall Made Knives, Morseth Knives, and what were becoming collectible custom knives. By the 1970s, Russell was hiring knifemakers to assemble in-house designs.
