= Ludo Monset =

Belgian politician (1946–2018)

Ludo Monset (7 October 1946 – 7 October 2018) was a Belgian politician representing Open VLD who served as a Senator from 1991 to 1995, and as Mayor of Blankenberge from 1995 to 2011.
