= Eugeniusz Kamiński =

Polish actor (1931–2018)

Eugeniusz Kamiński (8 November 1931, Bydgoszcz – 15 October 2018) was a Polish actor. In 1956, he graduated from the National Film School in Łódź. In the same year, he made his debut in the New Theatre in Łódź. Nine years later, he received the Plaque of Honour in Lodz.
