= Gaétan Gervais =

Canadian author (1944–2018)

Gaétan Gervais CM
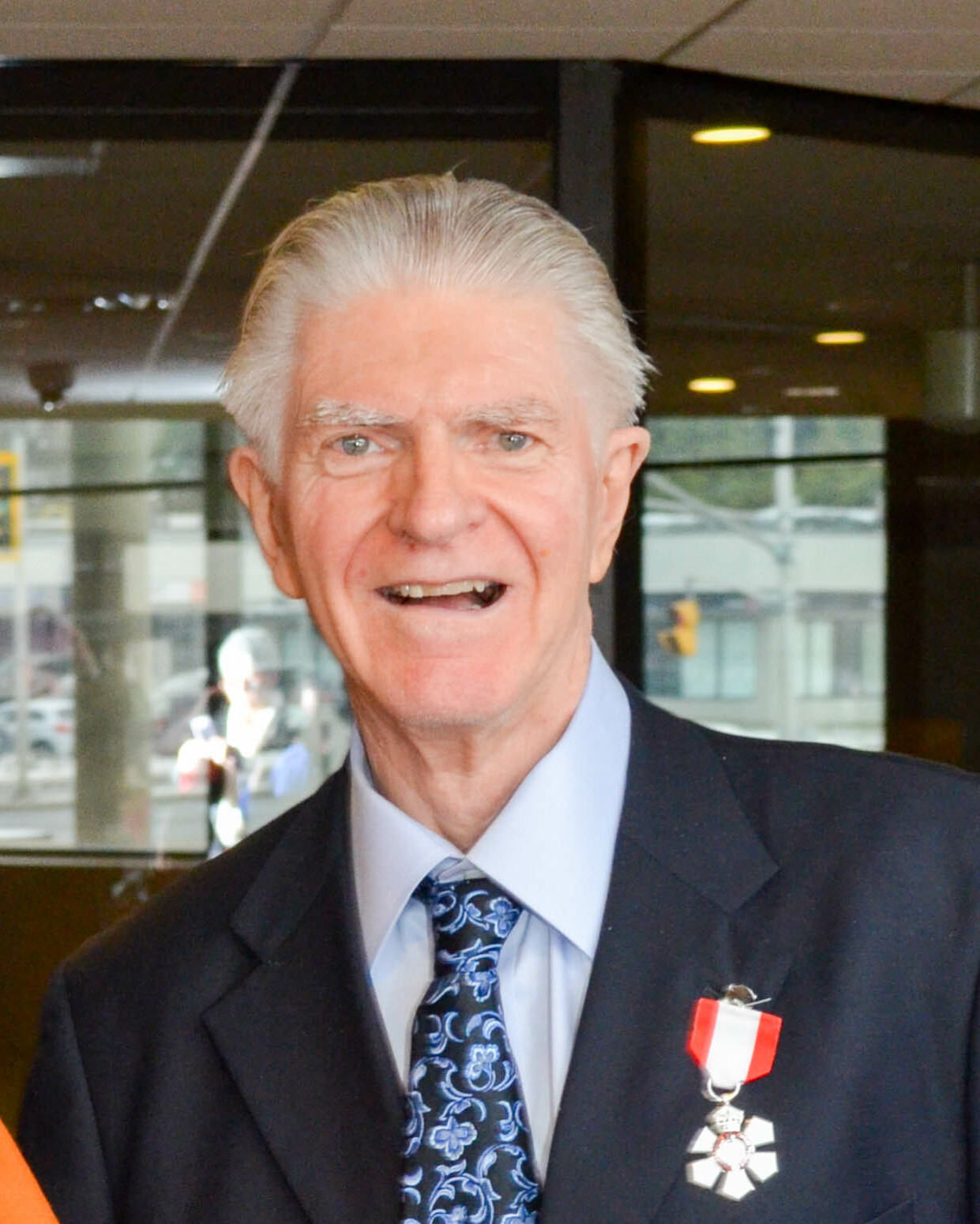
- Gaétan Gervais in 2014
- Born: August 10, 1944; Sudbury, Ontario, Canada
- Died: October 20, 2018 (aged 74); Sudbury, Ontario, Canada
- Occupations: historian, author, flag designer
- Known for: Co-creator of the Franco-Ontarian flag
- Notable work: Dictionnaire des écrits de l'Ontario français : 1613–1993

Gaétan Gervais, CM (August 10, 1944 – October 20, 2018) was a Canadian author, historian and university professor, most noted as a prominent figure in Franco-Ontarian culture. With a group of students at Laurentian University, he designed the Franco-Ontarian flag, and was a founding member of the Franco-Ontarian Institute.

== Biography ==
Born on August 10, 1944, in Sudbury, Ontario, Gervais graduated from Laurentian University in 1965. He also obtained a master's degree and a doctorate from the University of Ottawa in 1968 and 1979. From 1972, he was a professor at Laurentian University.

== Publications ==
- 2010 – Avec Jean-Pierre Pichette (dir.), Dictionnaire des écrits de l'Ontario français : 1613–1993, Ottawa, Presses de l'Université d'Ottawa, 1097 p. (ISBN 978-2-7603-0757-5)
- 2003 – Des gens de résolution : le passage du Canada français à l'Ontario français, Sudbury (Ontario), Éditions Prise de parole, 230 p. (ISBN 978-2-8942-3159-3)
- 2000 – Les jumelles Dionne et l'Ontario français, 1934–1944, Sudbury (Ontario), Éditions Prise de parole, 246 p. (ISBN 978-2-8942-3117-3), Prix Christine-Dumitriu-Van-Saanen
- 1985 – Bibliographie : histoire du nord-est de l'Ontario / Bibliography : history of North-Eastern Ontario, Sudbury (Ontario), Société historique du Nouvel-Ontario, 112 p. (ISBN 978-2-8942-3159-3)

== Awards and recognition ==
- 2013 – Member of the Order of Canada
- 2012 – A high school in Oakville, Ontario, is named after him as Gaétan-Gervais Secondary School.
- 2005 – Award of Merit Horace-Viau
- 1994 – Franco-Ontarian Order of Merit by the Association canadienne-française de l'Ontario, ACFO (now Ontario Francophonie Assembly, AFO)
