= Ramón Darío Molina Jaramillo =

Colombian Roman Catholic bishop (1935–2018)

Ramón Darío Molina Jaramillo OFM
- Bishop of Neiva
- Church: Catholic Church
- Diocese: Diocese of Neiva
- In office: 19 January 2001 – 4 February 2012
- Predecessor: Hernando Rojas Ramirez
- Successor: Froilán Casas Ortiz
- Previous posts: Bishop of Montería (1984-2001); Titular Bishop of Timici (1977-1984); Auxiliary Bishop of Bogotá (1977-1984)

Orders
- Ordination: 26 October 1961
- Consecration: 29 June 1977 by Aníbal Muñoz Duque

Personal details
- Born: 31 August 1935 Envigado, Antioquia Department, Colombia
- Died: 15 October 2018 (aged 83)

Ramón Darío Molina Jaramillo (31 August 1935 – 15 October 2018) was a Colombian Roman Catholic bishop.

Molina Jaramillo was born in Colombia and was ordained to the priesthood in 1961. He served as titular bishop of Timici and auxiliary bishop of the Roman Catholic Archdiocese of Bogotá, Colombia, from 1977 to 1984. He then served as bishop of the Roman Catholic Diocese of Montería from 1984 to 2001. He then served as bishop of the Roman Catholic Diocese of Neiva from 2001 to 2012.
