= Józef Kokot =

Polish footballer

Personal information
- Date of birth: 24 August 1929
- Place of birth: Lipiny, Poland
- Date of death: 2 October 2018 (aged 89)
- Height: 1.72 m (5 ft 8 in)
- Position: Forward

Senior career*
Years	Team	Apps	(Gls)
1943–1945	TuS 1883 Lipine		
1945–1950	Naprzód Lipiny		
1951–1952	CWKS Warsaw		
1952–1954	ŁKS-Włókniarz Łódź		
1955–1958	Naprzód Lipiny		
1959	Górnik Radlin		
1960–1962	BKS Stal Bielsko-Biała		

International career
1954	Poland	1	(0)
- * Club domestic league appearances and goals

Józef Kokot (24 August 1929 – 2 October 2018) was a Polish footballer who played as a forward.

He played in one match for the Poland national team in 1954.
