= Götz Schulze =

German jurist and judge

- Born: 8 October 1964; Karlsruhe, Baden-Württemberg, Germany
- Died: 30 October 2018 (aged 54); Potsdam, Brandenburg, Germany
- Citizenship: German
- Education: Heidelberg University
- Scientific career
- Fields: Private law, Civil procedure, Private international law, Sports law
- Workplaces: University of Potsdam

Götz Schulze (8 October 1964 in Karlsruhe – 30 October 2018 in Potsdam) was a German jurist and judge.

== Academic life ==
Schulze was born in 1964 in Karlsruhe where he took his Abitur in 1984 at the Max-Planck-Gymnasium (Karlsruhe). Afterwards he studied philosophy and law at the University of Würzburg, University of Lausanne (1988/1989) and the University of Heidelberg (Staatsexamen in 1992). He was a member of the student fraternity Wingolf Chattia zu Würzurg and the Société d’Étudiants Germania Lausanne.

He worked as scientific assistant (wissenschaftlicher Mitarbeiter) for Fritz Sturm at the Chaire de droit allemand (CDA) at the University of Lausanne. In 1997 he received a doctor's degree for his thesis Bedürfnis und Leistungsfähigkeit im Internationalen Unterhaltsrecht – Zum Anwendungsbereich von Art. 11 Abs. 2 des Haager Unterhaltsstatutsabkommens. In the same year he passed the German Second State Examination (Zweites Staatsexamen) after having articled as a Referendary at the Kammergericht in Berlin. From 1998 to 2003 he worked as scientific assistant (wissenschaftlicher Assistent) at the University of Heidelberg for Erik Jayme at the Institut for Foreign Law, Private International Law and International Commercial Law. Besides he worked as an assistant for Rudolf Nirk und Norbert Gross (barristers at the Bundesgerichtshof) from 1997 to 2001 and was called to the bar in 2001. In 2008 he habilitated with Die Naturalobligation – Rechtsfigur und Instrument des Rechtsverkehrs einst und heute (The Natural Obligation–Concept And Instrument of Legal Dealings Once And Today) in Heidelberg. The publication was considered as "masterpiece" and "having no equal concerning detail and conciseness".

Schulze went on to become a professor at the Chaire de droit allemand at the University of Lausanne and at the University of Potsdam at the chair for Private law, European Private law, Private International Law and Comparative Law in 2010. Since 2013 he is a judge at the Oberlandesgericht of Brandenburg. In 2014 he was invited to lecture at the Summer Courses of the Hague Academy of International Law (Private International Law—Sports law).

== Academic work (selection) ==
- Die Naturalobligation – Rechtsfigur und Instrument des Rechtsverkehrs einst und heute. Zugleich Grundlegung einer Forderungslehre im Zivilrecht. (The Imperfect Obligation—Concept and Instrument Of Legal Dealings Once and Today). Habilitation, Heidelberg 2008.
- Bedürfnis und Leistungsfähigkeit im Internationalen Unterhaltsrecht – Zum Anwendungsbereich von Art. 11 Abs. 2 des Haager Unterhaltsstatutsabkommens (= Art. 18 Abs. 7 EGBGB) und ihrer Bedeutung als narrativer Norm. (Needs and Resources In International Maintenance Law—The Scope of Art 11 Convention on the Law Applicable to Maintenance Obligations). (Dissertation, Heidelberg 1997).
