= Diocese of Neiva =

Diocese of the Catholic Church in Colombia

Diocese of Neiva Dioecesis Neivensis

Catholic

Location
- Country: Colombia
- Ecclesiastical province: Ibagué

Statistics
- Area: 10,523 km^{2} (4,063 sq mi)
- Population: Total; Catholics: (as of 2023); 550,450; 522,170 (94.9%)
- Parishes: 65

Information
- Denomination: Catholic Church
- Sui iuris church: Latin Church
- Rite: Roman Rite
- Established: 24 July 1972; 54 years ago
- Cathedral: Catedral de La Inmaculada Concepción
- Secular priests: 87 (73 Diocesan, 14 Religious Orders)

Current leadership
- Pope: Leo XIV
- Bishop: Marco Antonio Merchán Ladino
- Metropolitan Archbishop: Orlando Roa Barbosa
- Bishops emeritus: Froilán Casas Ortiz

Map

Website
- www.diocesisdeneiva.org

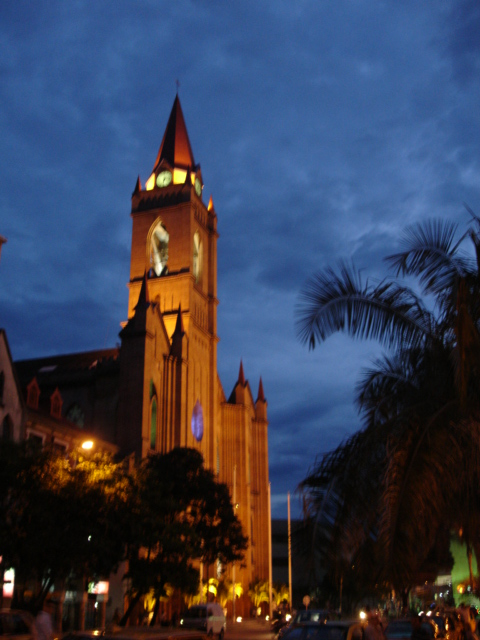
Cathedral of the Immaculate Conception

The Roman Catholic Diocese of Neiva (Latin: Neivensis) is a diocese located in the city of Neiva in the ecclesiastical province of Ibagué in Colombia.

== History ==
- 24 July 1972: Established as Diocese of Neiva from the Diocese of Garzón-Neiva

== Ordinaries ==
Bishops of Neiva (Roman rite)

- Rafael Sarmiento Peralta (1972.07.24 – 1985.01.12), appointed Archbishop of Nueva Pamplona
- Hernando Rojas Ramirez (1985.07.01 – 2001.01.19), retired
- Ramón Darío Molina Jaramillo, O.F.M. (2001.01.19 – 2012.02.04), retired
- Froilán Casas Ortiz (2012.02.04 – 2023.04.14), retired
- Marco Antonio Merchán Ladino (2023.04.14 – Present)

== See also ==
- Roman Catholicism in Colombia
- Immaculate Conception Cathedral, Neiva
