= Naomi Breslau =

Epidemiologist

Naomi Breslau (April 9, 1932 – October 13, 2018) was an American sociologist, psychiatric epidemiologist, and professor at Michigan State University. Much of Breslau's work focused on the psychological impact of trauma.

== Early life ==
Born in Afula in the British Mandate of Palestine, Breslau was the daughter of Ukrainian immigrants Shlomo Zeidel and Shoshana Fleischman Zeidel. She later moved to Hadera with her parents, brother and sister. Breslau graduated from law school at the Hebrew University of Jerusalem in 1954. Two years later, she came to New York University with the intention of studying the administration of justice, but she became more interested in sociology, earning a master's degree in 1963. She completed a Ph.D. at Case Western Reserve University in 1972.

== Career ==
Beginning in 1987, Breslau held a research director position in the Henry Ford Health System in Detroit. In 2003, she became a Michigan State University professor.

Breslau studied the psychological effects of traumatic events, and she found that traumatic events involving interpersonal violence were more likely to lead to PTSD than events not involving interpersonal violence. She also discovered that certain personal characteristics – such as male gender, black race, a history of behavior problems in childhood, a family history of psychiatric problems, extraversion, neuroticism and the lack of a college education – correlated with the likelihood of exposure to traumatic situations. She also discovered a correlation between migraines and suicide attempts.

Breslau was included on the Institute for Scientific Information's Highly Cited Researchers list in 2001. She once won the Harvard Award in Psychiatric Epidemiology and Biostatistics. She won the 2008 Robert S. Laufer, PhD, Memorial Award for Outstanding Scientific Achievement from the International Society for Traumatic Stress Studies and the 2011 Hoch Award from the American Psychopathological Association.

== Later life ==
Breslau died in hospice of uterine cancer on October 13, 2018. She was survived by her husband, psychiatrist Glenn Davis, whom she had married in 1990. Davis and Breslau lived in East Lansing, Michigan, before moving to North Carolina in 2015. She was also survived by three sons from her marriage to psychiatrist Lawrence Breslau.

== Representative papers ==
- Breslau, N., Chilcoat, H. D., Kessler, R. C., & Davis, G. C. (1999). Previous exposure to trauma and PTSD effects of subsequent trauma: Results from the Detroit Area Survey of Trauma. American Journal of Psychiatry, 156(6), 902–907.
- Breslau, N., Davis, G. C., Andreski, P., & Peterson, E. (1991). Traumatic events and posttraumatic stress disorder in an urban population of young adults. Archives of General Psychiatry, 48(3), 216–222.
- Breslau, N., Davis, G. C., Andreski, P., Peterson, E. L., & Schultz, L. R. (1997). Sex differences in posttraumatic stress disorder. Archives of General Psychiatry, 54(11), 1044–1048.
- Breslau, N., Kessler, R. C., Chilcoat, H. D., Schultz, L. R., Davis, G. C., & Andreski, P. (1998). Trauma and posttraumatic stress disorder in the community: The 1996 Detroit Area Survey of Trauma. Archives of General Psychiatry, 55(7), 626–632.
- Breslau, N., Roth, T., Rosenthal, L., & Andreski, P. (1996). Sleep disturbance and psychiatric disorders: A longitudinal epidemiological study of young adults. Biological Psychiatry, 39(6), 411–418.
