= Dale Linderman =

American politician

Member of the North Dakota House of Representatives from the 14th district
- In office 1963–1966
- In office 1969–1974

Personal details
- Born: March 20, 1924
- Died: October 16, 2018 (aged 94)
- Party: Democratic

Dale Linderman (March 20, 1924 – October 16, 2018) was an American politician who was a member of the North Dakota House of Representatives. He represented the 14th district from 1963 to 1966 and 1969 to 1974 as a member of the Democratic party. He is a farmer.
