= Kiyoko Miki =

Japanese politician (1919–2018)

- 三木 キヨ子

Member of the House of Representatives
- In office 10 April 1946 – 31 March 1947
- Preceded by: Constituency established
- Succeeded by: Constituency abolished
- Constituency: Osaka 1st

Personal details
- Born: 8 April 1919 Osaka, Japan
- Died: 26 October 2018 (aged 99)
- Party: Liberal
- Other party: DLP (1948–1950)

Kiyoko Miki (Japanese: 三木キヨ子; 8 April 1919 – 26 October 2018) was a Japanese politician. She was one of the first group of women elected to the House of Representatives in 1946.

== Biography ==
Born in Osaka, Miki attended Osaka Municipal High School for Housekeepers and subsequently ran a café and apartment block. She married during World War II, but divorced shortly afterwards.

Miki contested the 1946 general elections, the first in which women could vote, as a Minponto (People's Party) candidate in Osaka 1st district, and was elected to the House of Representatives, becoming its youngest female member. However, after being elected, she was charged with falsifying her educational records on her nomination form, having claimed to have attended Osaka Prefectural Women's College. She was sentenced to two months in jail and later expelled from the House of Representatives. During her time in parliament she also began a relationship with fellow MP Kiyoshi Kawanishi, announcing in December 1946 that they would marry after Kawaishi divorced his wife. However, his wife refused the divorce. Miki subsequently ran unsuccessfully as a Liberal Party candidate in the 1947 elections and as a Democratic Liberal Party candidate in the 1949 elections.

She later married a reporter from Asahi Shimbun and lived in Takarazuka. She died in 2018.
