= Tahir Chaudhry =

Pakistani chef and culinary expert

- Born: 24 October 1965; Lahore, Pakistan
- Died: 7 October 2018 (aged 52); Karachi, Pakistan

Tahir Chaudhry (born on 24 October 1965) (died 7 October 2018) was a Pakistani chef and culinary expert. Prior to working in Pakistan he has worked in Italy, France, and UAE. He was regarded as one of the top chefs in Pakistan. He had worked on Masala TV. He died of a cardiac arrest on 7 October 2018.
