= Edward E. Williams =

American economist (1945–2018)

Edward E. Williams (August 21, 1945 – October 3, 2018) was an American economist.

Edward Williams was raised in Houston by his parents Edward Earl Williams and Doris Jones Williams. His father worked for Southern Pacific Railroad. As a child, Williams sold old magazines door-to-door, and small items to other children while on field trips. Summer jobs Williams took on included work at the Magnet Cove Barium Corporation and the University State Bank. While in high school, Williams met Robert L. Waltrip, who later founded Service Corporation International. Williams graduated from Waltrip High School and attended the Wharton School before completing a doctorate at the University of Texas. Williams began his teaching career at Rutgers University, and moved to McGill University two years later. Following three years in Canada, Williams joined Service Corporation International. He returned to academia in 1978, accepting a position at Rice University. Williams was later appointed the Henry Gardiner Symonds Professor of Management and retired in 2014.
