= Scott Weir =

Scottish cricketer (1953–2018)

Personal information
- Full name: Robert Scott Weir
- Born: 1 May 1953; Glasgow, Scotland
- Died: 4 October 2018 (aged 65); Glasgow, Scotland
- Source: Cricinfo, 29 April 2021

Robert Scott Weir (1 May 1953 – 4 October 2018) was a Scottish cricketer. He played in four first-class and ten List A matches for the Scotland cricket team from 1975 to 1984. He was also a helicopter pilot for the RAF, and was awarded with the Air Force Cross in 1993.
