= P. Chandrasekhara Rao =

Indian jurist (1936–2018)

Patibandla. Chandrasekhara Rao (22 April 1936 – 11 October 2018) was an Indian jurist. He was from Veerullapadu village, Guntur-Krishna District of coastal Andhra Pradesh of what was then called Madras Presidency.

From October 1996 until 2017 he was a judge at the International Tribunal for the Law of the Sea (ITLOS). He was the president of ITLOS from 1999 to 2002. He was also an honorary visiting professor at Damodaram Sanjivayya National Law University, Visakhapatnam.

== Studies ==
Rao graduated from the University of Madras in two subjects, with a double bachelors in Arts as well as Law. Thereafter he did further studies, on completion of which he was awarded a Masters in Law and subsequently a doctorate.

== Career ==
Chandrasekhara Rao initially worked as a researcher for the Indian Society of International Law from 1963 to 1967. He then joined the Ministry of External Affairs (India) where he worked as a Law Officer (1967–1971) and subsequently Assistant Legal Adviser (1971–1976) in the Legal and Treaties Division. During this time, he acted as counsel for the Government of India in the case concerning an Appeal relating to the Jurisdiction of the ICAO (India v. Pakistan) before the International Court of Justice in 1972.

Thereafter Rao was appointed Legal Adviser to the Permanent Mission of India at the United Nations (New York City) from 1972 to 1976. He continued to hold high level posts in the Indian government's Ministry of Justice, including Deputy Legislative Counsel, Additional Legal Adviser, Joint Secretary and Legal Adviser, Additional Secretary (1976–1988), Secretary (1988–1996), Union Ministry of Law and Sole Arbitrator in Government contracts (1979–1983). He was the Secretary-General of the International Center for Alternative Dispute Resolution, New Delhi (1995–1996).

Since 1 October 1996, Rao has been a judge at the International Tribunal for the Law of the Sea.

Rao has also been a visiting professor from 1994 to 1995 at Osmania University, Hyderabad; Kakatiya University (Warangal) and University of Madras in 1995–96. From 1994 to 2000 he was president of the Indian Society of International Law.

== Awards ==
Rao was awarded the Padma Bhushan by the Government of India on 25 January 2012 for his contribution to the area of public affairs.

== Books ==
Rao has authored several books on International law including

- The New Law of Maritime Zones, 1982
- The Indian Constitution and International Law, 1993
- The Arbitration and Conciliation Act, 1996: A Commentary, 1997
- Alternative Dispute Resolution: What it means and how it works (ed.), 1996
- The International Tribunal for the Law of the Sea: Law and Practice (co-ed.), 2000
- The Rules of the International Tribunal for the Law of the Sea: A Commentary (co-ed.), 2006
