= Sylvia Weir =

- Born: July 1, 1925; Benoni, Gauteng, South Africa
- Died: October 13, 2018 (aged 93)
- Education: University of the Witwatersrand
- Scientific career
- Workplaces: University of Edinburgh; Massachusetts Institute of Technology

Sylvia Weir (1925–2018) was a paediatrician who worked on artificial intelligence. She pioneered the use of robotics in autism therapy.

== Early life and education ==
Weir was born in Benoni, Gauteng, South Africa. Her parents, Rachel Smith and Abraham Leiman, ran a shop. Weir studied medicine at the University of the Witwatersrand, graduating with a degree in medicine in 1950. She was a resident in Coronation Hospital, specialising in internal medicine and paediatrics. She worked as a paediatrician in South Africa. She became an activist and protested against apartheid, and left South Africa for the UK.

== Career ==
Weir was a medical resident in Scotland, joining the University of Edinburgh in 1974 as a researcher working on artificial intelligence. She moved to Massachusetts Institute of Technology in 1978 to work with Seymour Papert. Here she looked at initiatives to bring computers to education, particularly for exceptional children; the physically handicapped, autistic and those with specific learning disabilities. She was a pioneer in how robotics can be used for autism therapy. She demonstrated that the communication of a seven year old autistic child was catalysed by using a LOGO programmed remote control device. She worked with MIT and the Technical Education Research Centers. She looked at the Brookline LOGO Project, a computer based learning system for people with disabilities, and how children used it in elementary schools. From 1985 to 1986 she held weekly meetings to look at how young people could study fractions. She looked at how children with cerebral palsy could use computer based learning. One of the non-verbal students she helped went on to study at the University of Massachusetts Boston. She was a member of the Cerebral Palsy project, looking at how to maximise spatial and linguistic skills.

She met Aaron Motsoaledi and discussed opening the Mathematics, Science and Technology Education College for South African teachers. Weir moved back to Pietersburg at the age of 76. She was present for the first graduation of teachers. She retired to East Sussex. Weir established the charity Friends of Mponegele AIDS Orphans (FOMAO).
