= Tuti Tursilawati =

Indonesian housekeeper (1984–2018)

Tuti Tursilawati (6 June 1984 in Cikeusik, West Java, Indonesia – 29 October 2018 in Ta'if) was an Indonesian housekeeper who was executed on October 29, 2018 in Saudi Arabia. In 2011 she was convicted of the murder of her employer Suud Malhaq Al Utaibi, who she had been serving since 2009 and who had allegedly raped her. According to her, on May 11, 2010 she killed him in self-defense when he tried to rape her, she was 34 years old when she was executed.

Former president of Indonesia Bacharuddin Jusuf Habibie and high-ranking personalities were committed to the pardon of Tursilawati. Indonesia's government submitted both legal forms and a letter to King Salman of Saudi Arabia objecting to the death sentence, but was not informed about the upcoming execution. President Joko Widodo protested in a telephone conversation with Saudi Arabia's foreign minister Adel al-Jubeir against the execution. He also ordered the Saudi Ambassador to Jakarta. The Indonesian organization Migrant CARE called for the termination of agreements on Indonesian labor between Indonesia and Saudi Arabia. Local and international human rights organizations called for better protection for guest workers in Saudi Arabia. Tursilawati was already the third housekeeper to be executed in 2018 in Saudi Arabia.

== See also ==
- Capital punishment in Saudi Arabia
- Flor Contemplacion
- Sarah Balabagan
