= Bob Jones (illustrator) =

American artist and illustrator

- Born: Robert Goodhue Jones; October 27, 1926; Beverly Hills, California, U.S.
- Died: October 2, 2018 (aged 91)
- Occupations: Artist, illustrator
- Children: 5 (3 deceased)

Robert Goodhue Jones (October 27, 1926 – October 2, 2018) was an American artist and illustrator. Jones is best known for creating illustrations for the American gasoline company Exxon's "Put a tiger in your tank" campaign. He has also had works published in The Saturday Evening Post and MAD.

== Biography ==
Jones was born October 27, 1926, in Beverly Hills, California. While still in high school, Jones got his first professional cartooning work at Warner Bros. Cartoons, where he did inbetweening as a summer job. He then served in the United States Navy from 1944 to 1946, when he was honorably discharged. Using benefits from the G. I. Bill, Jones studied art at University of Southern California and then ArtCenter College of Design, from which he graduated cum laude with a Bachelor of Fine Arts in 1949.

After moving to Hastings-on-Hudson, New York, in the early 1950s, Jones began working as an illustrator primarily for the Charles Cooper Studios. His works appeared in the magazines McCall's, The Saturday Evening Post, and Good Housekeeping. By the 1960s, Jones had begun working as a freelance artist, primarily in the field of advertising. From 1964 to 1982, his work was used by the gasoline company Esso (now Exxon) for their advertising campaign "put a tiger in your tank", which featured Jones's illustrations of a cartoon tiger. In 1976, he began working for MAD after editor Nick Meglin chose him to illustrate a cover. Jones continued to serve at MAD for over twenty years, doing cover art, articles, and paperback books for the publication.

== Personal life ==
After retiring from the art industry, Jones held a summer residence on Block Island, where he pursued his pastimes of fishing and boating, in addition to painting.

Jones was married to Ann Burton from c. 1949 to 1974. The couple had five children: Robert A., Timothy, Peter, Linda, and Martha. Timothy died in infancy, while Robert A. died in 1976 and Peter in 2016. Jones died from complications of pulmonary fibrosis at age 91 in 2018. He is survived by his daughters and ex-wife.
