= María Cervera =

Peruvian volleyball player (1956–2018)

Personal information
- Full name: María Amelia Cervera Cevedón
- Nickname: La Gata
- Nationality: Peruvian
- Born: 26 February 1956
- Died: 16 October 2018 (aged 62)
- Height: 1.68 m (5 ft 6 in)

Volleyball information
- Number: 11

National team
1973–1976	Peru
Honours
Women's volleyball
Representing Peru
Pan American Games
Silver medal – second place	1975 Mexico City	Team
CSV South American Championship
Gold medal – first place	1973 Bucaramanga

María Cervera (26 February 1956 – 16 October 2018) was a Peruvian volleyball player. Cervera competed in the women's tournament at the 1976 Summer Olympics in Montreal, where she finished in seventh place. She won a silver medal at the 1975 Pan American Games in Mexico City.
