= Frank Litsky =

American sports columnist (1926–2018)

- Born: August 15, 1926; Waterbury, Connecticut, U.S.
- Died: October 30, 2018 (aged 92)
- Occupation: Sports journalism
- Employer: The New York Times

Frank Litsky (August 15, 1926 – October 30, 2018) was an American sports columnist for The New York Times. Litsky started with the Times in 1958 and wrote more than 3,700 articles for the newspaper. He covered multiple sports, including track and field, and also served as the president of the New York Track Writer's Association from 1969 until his retirement in 2009.

Born in Waterbury, Connecticut, Litsky graduated from the University of Connecticut in 1946 at the age of 19.
