= Cosimo Ennio Masiello =

Italian lawyer and politician (1929–2018)

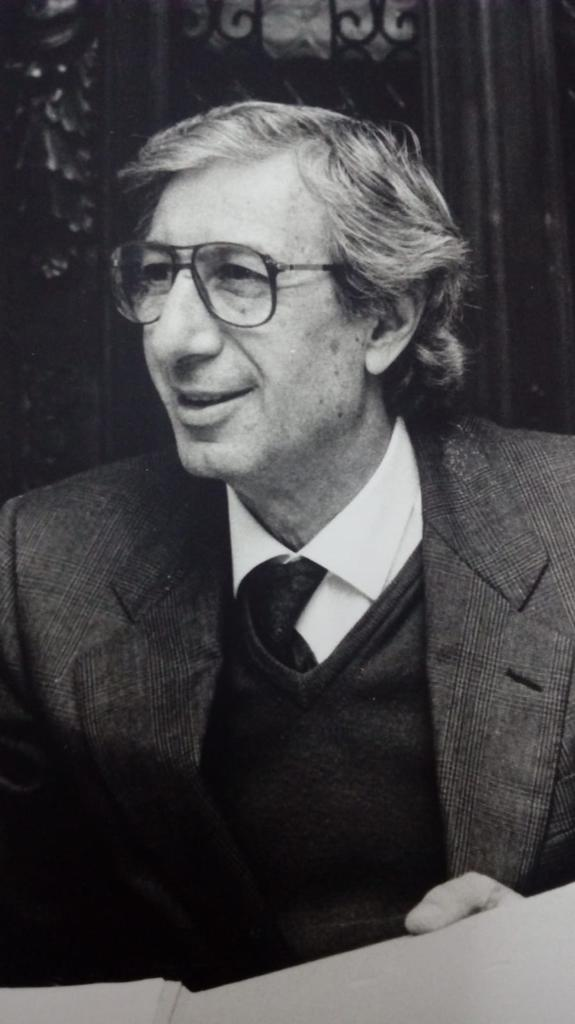
Cosimo Ennio Masiello

Cosimo Ennio Masiello (2 November 1929 – 2 October 2018) was an Italian lawyer and politician.

A native of Brindisi born on 2 November 1929, Masiello was trained as a lawyer. He served as mayor of his hometown from 16 December 1987 to 21 December 1988, and was elected to the Senate of the Republic on the Democrats of the Left ballot in 1992. Masiello sought another term as mayor of Brindisi in 1996, losing the office to Lorenzo Maggi. One of his children, Mauro, later served on the Brindisi municipal council. Masiello died at the age of 89 on 2 October 2018.
