= Rudy Horn =

German juggler (1933–2018)

Rudy Horn (14 February 1933 – 12 October 2018) was a well-regarded juggler.

== Information ==
He began at age 7 and later toured around the world. He appeared on The Ed Sullivan Show four times. He retired from juggling in 1975 and became a tennis coach. He is an inductee of the Juggling Hall of Fame.

== Background ==
Rudy Horn was born and grew up in Nuremberg, Germany during the time of World War II. On Christmas Eve in the year of 1940, Rudy Horn was given three apples from his father. It was then that his father had encouraged him to start juggling them. He continued with this talent since this day on. Two years after he was given these apples from his father, he gave his first performance in the WIntergarden. In the next five years that followed the war, he entertained the troops from the United States that were located in Germany. Since the currency in Germany was basically worthless at the time, he would work for cigarettes and chocolate that he would barter for food. One of the stunts that he was known for other than juggling is that he would be able to stack up teacups and their saucers on his head from kicking them up from his foot. He also had the skill of continuously bouncing seven balls off of a drum. In the year of 1949, Horn had joined the Circus Krone. Once he joined the circus, he was able to obtain a unicycle that he learned how to ride within a week. Once he incorporated the unicycle into his teacup act, he became even more popular. He traveled to America to perform in Las Vegas, Reno, Chicago, and San Francisco, but eventually in the year of 1955 he went back to Germany. The German government awarded Rudy Horn the Bundesverdienstkreuz, which is a high achievement award. In the year of 1973, he also was awarded the Rastelli award, which is the highest honor for a juggler. He finally retired in the year of 1975 in the Bertchesgaden, which is located in the Bavarian Alps. This is when he took up his second job of being a tennis coach.

He died on 12 October 2018.

== Performances ==
Rudy Horn was hired to entertain for the following:

- Circus Krone
- Bertram Mills Circus in England
- London's Olympia Hall
- Savoy
- Palladium
- Lido in Paris
- Ed Sullivan Show
