= Edwin-Michael Cortez =

American librarian and educator

- Ed Cortez
- Born: December 16, 1951; New York City, New York, U.S.
- Died: October 6, 2018 (aged 66)
- Education: Wagner College; University of Arizona; University of Southern California

Edwin-Michael Cortez (December 16, 1951 – October 6, 2018) was a library science professor and director of the School of Information Sciences at the University of Tennessee.

== Early life ==
Cortez was born in New York City the son of Michael and Cecilia (Vasquez) Cortez. He graduated from Wagner College in 1972, received his Master of Library Science from University of Arizona in 1973 and Doctor of Philosophy in Information Science and Management Communication from the University of Southern California in 1980.

== Professional life ==
Cortez was a professor at University of Wisconsin–Madison for 17 years and was acting dean of Catholic University of America. He joined the University of Tennessee faculty in 2005 where he served as professor and Director for 11 years, retiring at the end of 2016.

He was an early automation consultant, helping library systems such as Ann Arbor Public Library, California State Library and the Connecticut State University System, evaluate and implement circulation, database and online catalog systems in the 1980s.

== Research ==
Cortez worked on the overlapping of information technology, organizational communication, and organizational effectiveness. He used ethnographic and social network theories to inform information technology design and management. He was the principal investigator for three years on the USDA's project, the REEIS initiative (Research, Education & Economic Information Systems) which aimed to "build a comprehensive web-based information system in the field of agriculture."
