= Sylvia Edwards =

American abstract artist (1937 – 2018)

- Fragmented Joy, Water colour
- Born: 30 January 1937; Boston, Massachusetts, United States
- Died: 25 October 2018 (aged 81); London, United Kingdom
- Education: Massachusetts College of Art
- Known for: Painting
- Spouse: Sadredin Golestaneh
- Children: 3

Sylvia Anne Edwards (January 30, 1937 – October 25, 2018) was an American abstract artist. Edwards first exhibited her work in 1975 and went on to hold over thirty solo exhibitions in the United States, Europe, the Middle East, and North Africa during her lifetime.

== Biography ==
Sylvia Edwards was born in Boston, Massachusetts, to Junius and Sylvia (née Mailloux) Edwards. Her father was a music promoter and manager. Edwards’s future career began at home, where her mother instilled in her a love for art.

Edwards attended Massachusetts College of Art from 1954 to 1957. There, she was influenced by Lawrence Kupferman, a Modernist painter who introduced his students to the work of artists Georges Braque, Piet Mondrian, and to the dynamics of cityscapes.

Edwards left college to marry an Iranian international student. They had their first daughter, Shirin, in 1958. Edwards continued her education at the Boston Museum of Fine Arts during this time. In 1960, they moved to Philadelphia, where they had their second child, Nader. The family relocated to Tehran, Iran, in 1961. In 1966, Edwards gave birth to her third child, Leila, in Southern Iran.

Edwards moved to Switzerland in 1975 before settling in London in 1977. She completed her postgraduate studies at the Modern Art Studies in London in 1980-1981. She spent summers painting in her studio on Cape Cod, Massachusetts. She resided in England until her death in 2018 at Chelsea Westminster Hospital.

The biographers Mel Gooding and David Elliott chronicled her life and work in an eponymously named book Sylvia Edwards: A Monograph, released in 2002.

== Art ==
Sylvia Edwards is an abstract watercolor painter. She was influenced by Matisse, Klee, Milton Avery, and Mark Rothko.

== Solo exhibitions ==
- London, England, Grosvenor Gallery, 2003
- London, England, Chelsea Arts Club, 2000
- Boca Grande, Florida, The Galleria, 2000
- Falmouth, Massachusetts, Gallery Szent-Györgyi, 1998
- Boca Grande, Florida, The Galleria, 1998
- Oxford, England, CCA Gallery, 1996
- Provincetown, Massachusetts, Sola Gallery, 1993
- Vero Beach, Florida, Munson Gallery, 1992
- Braunschweig, Germany, Jaeshke Gallery, 1991
- Chatham, Massachusetts, Munson Gallery, 1991
- Johannesburg, South Africa, Natalie Knight Gallery, 1991
- Tokyo, Japan, Bankamura, 1991
- Tokyo, Japan, Gallery K. Hyazaki Prefecture, 1991
- Tokyo, Japan, Mitsukoshi Mihonbashi Branch, 1991
- London, England, Berkley Square Gallery, 1991
- Tokyo, Japan, Sony Plaza, 1991
- Sarasota, Florida, The Salon Gallery, 1990
- London, England, CCA Gallery, 1990
- Singapore, Art Base Gallery, 1989
- Tokyo, Japan, CCA Gallery, 1989
- Osaka, Japan, The Nii Gallery, 1989
- London, England, The Berkeley Square Gallery, 1988
- Guernsey, Channel Isles, Coach House Gallery, 1986
- London, England, Christopher Hull Gallery, 1985
- London, England, Hamiltons Gallery, 1982
- Chapel Hill, North Carolina, Morehead Planetarium (UNC), 1982
- Boston, Massachusetts, Parkman House, 1982
- Boston, Massachusetts, Boston City Hall, 1981
- London, England, Hamiltons Gallery, 1980
- Alexandria, Egypt, Museum of Fine Arts, 1980
- Martha's Vineyard, Massachusetts, Old Sculpin Gallery, 1979
- London, England, Belgrave Gallery, 1978
- Geneva, Switzerland, CERN, 1977
- Rolle, Switzerland, CH Gallery, 1976
- Tehran, Iran, Iran American Society, 1975

== Public collections ==
- Tate Britain, London, United Kingdom
- Cape Museum of Fine Arts (Cape Cod), Dennis, Massachusetts
- Museum of Fine Arts, Alexandria, Egypt
- London Lighthouse, London, United Kingdom
- Midwest Museum of American Art, Elkhart, Indiana
