= Silvester Brito =

American poet and academic

Silvester John Brito (September 26, 1937 - October 7, 2018) was an American poet and academic. He was an associate professor of anthropology and folklore at the University of Wyoming.

== Early life and education ==
Brito was born September 26, 1937, in Delta, Colorado. He was of Comanche and Purépecha descent. Brito completed a Ph.D. in folklore at Indiana University Bloomington in 1975.

== Career ==
Brito was an associate professor for the University of Wyoming, teaching anthropology, American folklore studies, Chicano, and religious studies. Brito was a member of M.E.C.h.A. and Keepers of the Fire.

Brito published several books of poetry, Man From a Rainbow, Looking Through A Squared Off Circle, and Red Cedar Warrior, and an ethnography, The Way of A Peyote Roadman. His poetry has appeared in CALLALOO (a creative writing publishing forum at the Texas A&M University in College Station), in the American Indian anthology, Studies In American Indian Literature: Returning The Gift (University of Arizona Press), and in The Blue Cloud Quarterly Volume 28, Number 4 .

== Personal life ==
Brito was married to Carol (Coble) Brito for 56 years and had four children: Desiree, Michael, Juan and Jude. His parents Benjamin and Jessie Brito predeceased him. Brito died October 7, 2018, in Cheyenne, Wyoming.
