= Cindy Li =

- Born: September 5, 1975; Taiwan
- Died: October 15, 2018 (aged 43); Fox Chapel, Pennsylvania, U.S.
- Education: University of Florida (BFA)
- Awards: In 2012, she was listed as one of .net magazine's 20 Leading Web Designers.
- Website: cindyli.com

Cindy Sang-Ching Li (September 5, 1975 – October 15, 2018) was a Taiwanese-American web designer, author, and speaker known for her expertise in CSS, user experience, and accessibility. She was a member of the CSS Working Group created by the World Wide Web Consortium.

Li died of cancer at the age of 43 on October 15, 2018.

== Career ==
Li began her design career in 1995 when she was selected to typeset the 1996 Atlanta Olympics wall. She worked for NetChannel—an internet television startup in Norcross, GA, until it was bought out in by AOL in 1998.

Li's work at AOL included the AOLTV project, launched in 2000. She also worked on the AOL Channels: Health and Fitness, Personal Finance, Shopping, AIM Pages, AIM Lite, AOL.com, Ficlets, and Mac Development. In June 2005, Li was the designer of AOL's coverage of the Live 8. She won the first Broadband Emmy Award in 2006 for her work on Live 8 on AOL.

Li worked for Yahoo! after AOL, and was the lead designer for the relaunch of Flickr for iOS in 2012.

She was an author of a web design blog, several articles for net, and co-author of Professional CSS: Cascading Style Sheets for Web Design, 2nd ed.

== Awards and recognitions ==
In 2006, Li won the Broadband Emmy Award for her work on Live 8 on AOL, the first time that a multi-city, around-the-planet event had been broadcast live through the internet without any breaks.

In 2012, she was listed as one of .net magazine’s 20 Leading Web Designers.

== Books and articles ==
- Li co-authored the second edition (2008) of Professional CSS: Cascading Style Sheets for Web Design, a guide to using CSS for web design using web standards(ISBN 9780470177082).
- Li's net article Find the perfect colour for your website is a guide to using color to improve the attractiveness and usability of a website while remaining accessible. It was published in 2014.

== Public speaking ==
Cindy Li gave opening keynotes at web design and user experience conferences, and was a frequent speaker at design and interaction conferences, most notably An Event Apart, Future of Web Design, Open Web Camp, and South by Southwest Interactive.

== Other work ==
- Book cover designer of The Whuffie Factor
- Ficlets – user interface design and programming
