= William Shearer (immunologist) =

American immunologist (1937–2018)

William Thomas Shearer (August 23, 1937 – October 9, 2018) was an American immunologist who is best known for his treatment of David Vetter (1971–1984), the "boy in the bubble".

He graduated from Washington University School of Medicine, trained at St. Louis Children's Hospital and Barnes Hospital, the medical school's affiliated hospitals, before joining the Washington University in St. Louis faculty. In 1978 he moved from St. Louis to Houston in order to take over David's care. He spent the next 40 years at Baylor College of Medicine and Texas Children's Hospital, where he founded the Allergy and Immunology Section of the Department of Pediatrics and served as chief for 34 years until his death.
