= Paris Underground (film) =

1945 film by Gregory Ratoff

- Directed by: Gregory Ratoff
- Written by: Boris Ingster; Gertrude Purcell
- Produced by: Constance Bennett
- Starring: Constance Bennett; Gracie Fields
- Cinematography: Lee Garmes; Edward Cronjager
- Edited by: James E. Newcom
- Music by: Alexander Tansman
- Production company: Constance Bennett Productions
- Distributed by: United Artists
- Release date: October 19, 1945
- Running time: 97 minutes
- Country: United States
- Language: English
- Budget: $1 million

Paris Underground, also known as Madame Pimpernel, is a 1945 film directed by Gregory Ratoff, and based on the memoir of the same title by Etta Shiber.

The film stars Constance Bennett and Gracie Fields as an American and an Englishwoman trapped in Paris when Nazi Germany invades in 1940, who rescue British airmen shot down in France and help them escape across the English Channel. It was Bennett's only producing credit. The film's sets were designed by the art director Nicolai Remisoff.

Alexandre Tansman was nominated for the Academy Award for Best Original Score (one of 21 nominations that year).

== Plot ==
American Kitty de Mornay quarrels with her French husband Andre over her lack of concern over the imminent fall of Paris to the Germans. She is so ignorant of the danger she is in that she flees with her English friend Emmeline "Emmy" Quayle too late. They end up at the country inn of Pappa Renard. After serving them a meal, he reveals that an English flyer, Flight Lieutenant William Gray, is hiding out there. Since Renard is unwilling to continue sheltering Gray, the women decide to take him back to Paris with them. When their car has a flat, German Captain Kurt von Weber happens by and has one of his men change the tire. Since he is going to Paris too, von Weber personally drives them back, past all the German patrols and checkpoints. When he leaves, he gives Kitty his card, revealing that he is assigned to the military department of the Gestapo. They sneak Gray past Madame Martin, Emmy's concierge, and into her apartment.

A week later, Gray decides he has to leave, as anyone caught sheltering an enemy serviceman will be executed. Before he can, the Germans surround and search the building. The timely arrival of von Weber, with a bouquet of flowers, ensures that the search is cut short. Kitty suggests going out to a nightclub to get the German out of the apartment. At the club, they encounter Andre. While dancing, Kitty apprises Andre of her situation and asks for his help in getting Gray out.

Following Andre's instructions, they contact Tissier, a baker. By bad luck, a German patrol happens by, and Emmy is taken in for questioning. After seeing Gray off, Kitty goes back to see what she can do for her friend. To her surprise, she finds Emmy at Tissier's place.

Kitty is persuaded to help others escape with them. Emmy reluctantly decides to get involved too, just to keep Kitty out of trouble. They contact Father Dominique. Expecting to sneak one man into unoccupied France, they are surprised to find the priest hiding about a dozen in his crypt. The women take two with them, but when they reach Tissier's bakery, they learn that he has been shot. When they discover that the local cemetery is across the border, Kitty decides to use a funeral to get the men. The undertaker, however, informs them that the Germans are on guard against such attempts. However, he expects the aged Marquise de Montigny to pass away soon; when she does, the undertaker is glad to be able to give the worthy, yet poverty-stricken woman a lavish funeral procession, with the soldiers disguised as mourners. At the last moment, Kitty and Emmy decide to go back to continue smuggling.

By 1942, the occupying Germans are frustrated that so many Allied soldiers are eluding them. Von Weber comes up with a plan to destroy the smuggling network. He arranges for a fake Allied pilot to be "shot down". The man is brought to Emmy's antique shop hidden inside a chest. She is warned, but he becomes suspicious and pulls a gun and calls the Gestapo. She is able to strike him on the head (fatally) with a candlestick when he is distracted. However, too much is overheard over the phone, and the Germans, led by von Weber, come for them; Andre is there as well, back from England on a mission for the Free French. Emmy is captured, but the others evade the first sweep, hiding in the basement. When they overhear that von Weber will not stop searching, utterly convinced Kitty is still in the building, she knocks Andre out and gives herself up to save him.

They survive to be liberated by the Allies, though Emmy is so unhinged by her ordeal that she at first does not even recognize her friend.

== Cast ==
- Constance Bennett as Kitty de Mornay
- Gracie Fields as Emmeline Quayle
- Kurt Kreuger as Capt. Kurt von Weber
- Charles Andre as Father Dominique
- Leslie Vincent as Lt. William Gray
- Eily Malyon as Madame Martin
- Gregory Gaye as Tissier
- George Rigaud as Andre de Mornay
- Vladimir Sokoloff as Undertaker
- Richard Ryen as Mons. Renard
- Maurice Cass as Patriot
- Adrienne D'Ambricourt as Margot
- Andrew McLaglen as Sgt. McNair

== Reception ==
Philip K. Scheuer of the Los Angeles Times wrote that it was unlikely "that the film will cause more than a ripple of interest, although the moviegoer who chances inside should still find it possible to drum up some vicarious excitement over the fate of the two ladies and their rapid turnover of proteges."

Bosley Crowther of The New York Times was unenthusiastic, writing, "it is hard to imagine that the actual participants in that work [smuggling downed airmen to safety] were as la-de-da and frolicsome about it as are Miss Bennett and Miss Fields."

In The Nation in 1945, critic James Agee stated, "Good performance by Bennett except in any attempt to portray actions requiring a heart. Excellent performance by Gracie Fields. Otherwise mainly trash, involving enough handsome young men, in various postures of gallant gratitude, to satisfy Mae West in her prime."

Glenn Erickson gave the movie an unfavorable review, calling it a "rather undistinguished spy thriller. It has reasonable production values but lacks a strong script and is shaky in the credibility department."
