= Germ Hofma =

Dutch footballer (1925–2018)

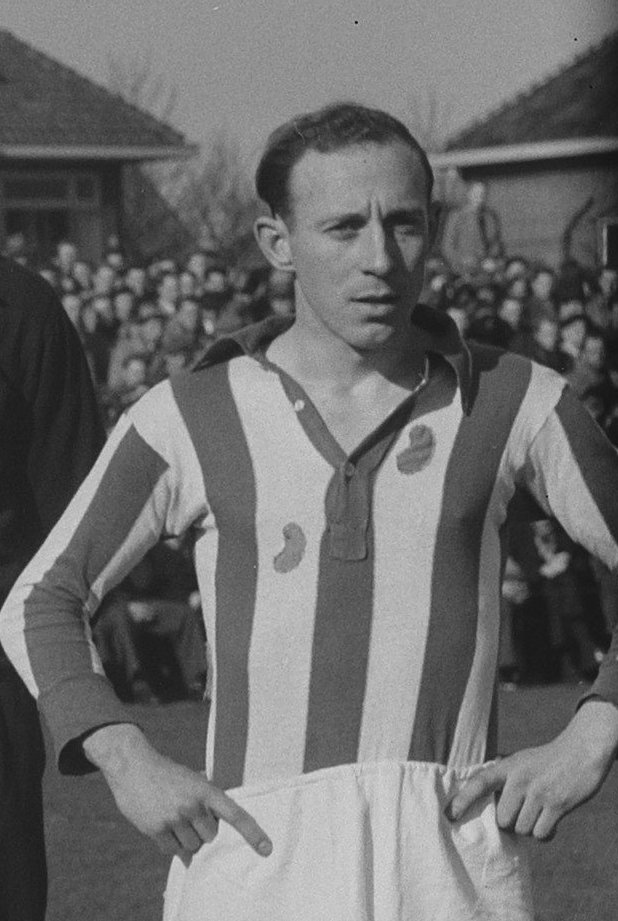
- Germ Hofma (1951)

Personal information
- Full name: Gerben Hofma
- Date of birth: 19 April 1925
- Place of birth: Sittard, Netherlands
- Date of death: 14 October 2018 (aged 93)
- Place of death: Doetinchem, Netherlands
- Position: Striker

Senior career*
Years	Team	Apps	(Gls)
1940–1945	DIO Oosterwolde		
1945–1954	Heerenveen		(82)
1956-1959	Heerenveen	48	(9)

International career
1950	Netherlands	2	(0)
- * Club domestic league appearances and goals

Gerben 'Germ' Hofma (19 April 1925 – 14 October 2018) was a Dutch football player in the 1940s and 1950s. He most notably played for Heerenveen.

He died in Doetinchem as the then oldest living Dutch international player in 2018.

== Club career ==
Hofma was born in Limburg but grew up in Friesland and at Heerenveen he formed a prolific partnership with club legend Abe Lenstra, winning 5 successive Eerste Klasse North titles.

== International career ==
Hofma was capped twice by the Netherlands in 1950.
