= Paul Henle =

American politician

Member of New Hampshire House of Representatives for Merrimack 12
- In office 2012–2018
- Succeeded by: Connie Lane

Personal details
- Born: November 30, 1949 Arlington, Virginia
- Died: October 7, 2018 (aged 68) Concord, New Hampshire
- Party: Democratic
- Education: Manhattan School of Music
- Alma mater: University of Rochester; University of Massachusetts Amherst

Paul Henle (November 30, 1949 – October 7, 2018) was an American politician. He was a member of the New Hampshire House of Representatives and represented Merrimack 12th district from 2012 to 2018.

== Biography ==
Henle was born in Arlington, Virginia and graduated from the University of Rochester and the University of Massachusetts Amherst. He studied percussion at the Manhattan School of Music. In October 2018, he died following a brain injury.
