= Nino Lombardo =

Italian politician (died 2018)

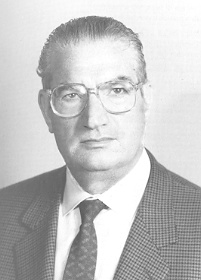
Antonino "Nino" Lombardo

Nino Lombardo (July 14, 1927 – October 7, 2018) was an Italian politician who served as a Deputy from 1976 to 1994.
