= Gerard Houlton =

English cricketer (1939–2018)

Gerard Houlton (25 April 1939 - 20 October 2018 (aged 79)) was an English cricketer active from 1961 to 1963 who played for Lancashire. He was born in St Helens, Lancashire. He appeared in 20 first-class matches, scoring 688 runs with a highest score of 86 and held five catches.
