= William N. Jones =

American politician

William Nathaniel Jones

Member of the Utah State Senate from the 14th district
- In office 1979–1982

Personal details
- Born: May 14, 1926 (age 100) Ogden, Utah, U.S.
- Died: October 19, 2018
- Party: Republican
- Education: University of Utah (BA); Harvard Business School (MBA)

William "Bill" Nathaniel Jones (May 14, 1926 – October 19, 2018) was an American businessman and politician. In 1964, he founded Electro Controls, Inc. and was owner and CEO for over 30 years. As the chairman of the board of Intermountain Health from its creation in 1975 until 1990, he directed much of Intermountain Health's early growth. He was a member of other corporate boards, including Questar Market Resources, Inc..

His political career culminated in his service as Republican member for the 14th district of the Utah State Senate from 1979 to 1982.
