= Juan Francisco Heredia =

Spanish footballer

Personal information
- Full name: Juan Francisco Heredia Marín
- Date of birth: 8 July 1989 (age 37)
- Place of birth: Lorca, Spain
- Height: 1.74 m (5 ft 9 in)
- Position: Midfielder

Senior career*
Years	Team	Apps	(Gls)
2006–2007	Lorca Deportiva	1	(0)
2011–2012	Lorca Atlético	19	(1)
Total		20	(1)
- * Club domestic league appearances and goals

Juan Francisco Heredia Marín (born 8 July 1989) is a Spanish former professional footballer who played for Lorca Deportiva and Lorca Atlético, as a midfielder.
