= Mario Castellazzi =

Italian footballer

Personal information
- Date of birth: November 9, 1935
- Place of birth: Finale Emilia, Italy
- Date of death: 1 October 2018 (aged 82)
- Place of death: La Spezia, Italy
- Height: 1.74 m (5 ft 8 1/2 in)
- Position: Midfielder

Senior career*
Years	Team	Apps	(Gls)
1953–1955	Sassuolo		
1955–1957	Cremonese	44	(11)
1957–1959	Spezia	55	(15)
1959–1960	Roma	6	(0)
1960–1962	Catania	51	(8)
1962–1963	Livorno	18	(2)
1963–1964	Pistoiese	20	(?)
1964–1968	Spezia	74	(6)
- * Club domestic league appearances and goals

Mario Castellazzi (9 November 1935 – 1 October 2018) was an Italian professional footballer.

He played for 3 seasons (57 games, 8 goals) in the Serie A for A.S. Roma and Calcio Catania.

He spent most of his career at Spezia, playing 138 matches and scoring 26 goals. After retiring from football, he worked as a television commentator.
