= Juan Heredia (footballer, born 1952) =

Spanish footballer

Personal information
- Full name: Juan Heredia Moreno
- Date of birth: 24 April 1942
- Place of birth: Almodóvar del Río, Spain
- Date of death: 8 October 2018 (aged 76)
- Height: 1.79 m (5 ft 10 in)
- Position: Goalkeeper

Senior career*
| Years | Team | Apps | (Gls) |
| 1966–1975 | Mallorca | 70 | (0) |
| Total | | 70 | (0) |
- * Club domestic league appearances and goals

Juan Heredia Moreno (24 April 1942 – 8 October 2018) was a Spanish professional footballer who played for Mallorca, as a goalkeeper.
