= Paris Underground (book) =

Book

Paris Underground is a memoir written by Etta Shiber in 1943. The book was later made into a film with the same name in 1945.

The book discusses Ms. Shiber's experiences helping British pilots trapped behind enemy lines escape from Nazi Germany during World War II. In the book, Ms. Shiber refers to her French colleague who helped shelter British pilots as "Kitty Beaurepos" to hide her identity, since the war was ongoing at the time of publication. The real name of "Kitty Beaurepos" was "Catherine (Kate) Bonnefous (nee Robins)."

Both Shiber and Beaurepos (Bonnefous in real life) were captured by the Germans after their underground operation helping British pilots was discovered by the Germans. But in May 1942, Shiber was freed in a prisoner swap with the United States in exchange for Johanna Hofmann, a German who had been convicted of spying in the U.S. The book does not reveal whether "Beaurepos" (Bonnefous) actually survived the war or not, as the author did not know herself at the time of publication in 1943. In fact, Bonnefous actually survived the war after being captured by the Germans.

Shiber died in 1948.
