= Herbert Doussant =

American operatic tenor (1931–2018)

Herbert Doussant (September 7, 1931, New York, New York – October 29, 2018 in New York, New York) was an American operatic tenor. He sang at major opera houses in Europe and the Americas, appearing in a wide variety of roles from the Italian and German repertoires that ranged from the lyric to the dramatic.

== Career ==
He was originally an insurance agent. He then studied with Douglas Stanley and Paul Weiner in New York, went to Europe and debuted in 1958 at the Municipal Theater of Mainz as Walther von Stolzing in Die Meistersinger von Nürnberg. He remained there until 1960 and then sang at the Stadttheater in Kiel from 1960 to 1963, and at the Stadttheater in Krefeld from 1966 to 1969. He has performed at the Deutsche Oper am Rhein Duesseldorf-Duisburg, at the State Opera of Munich, in Cologne, Nuremberg, Essen, Frankfurt am Main, Hannover, Mannheim and Wiesbaden. In 1961 he worked at the Stadttheater of Kiel in the world premiere of the opera Faust III by Bentzon. He also appeared in Liege, Athens, Bologna and Turin, at the Komische Oper Berlin, in Barcelona, Philadelphia, Honolulu and San Antonio (Texas). In 1964 he appeared in Mexico City as Herod in Salome by Richard Strauss, 1976 and 1979 at the Opera of Houston / Texas as Othello by Verdi. In his repertoire for the stage were in the first place parts of the heroic tenor subject, including Wagner heroes. His voice has been described as "pliant and strong" and "his sense of the theatric keen".

== Notable recordings ==
Wagner: Das Rheingold / Hans Swarowsky, Profil (2013)
