= Engelbert Siebler =

German Roman Catholic bishop (1937–2018)

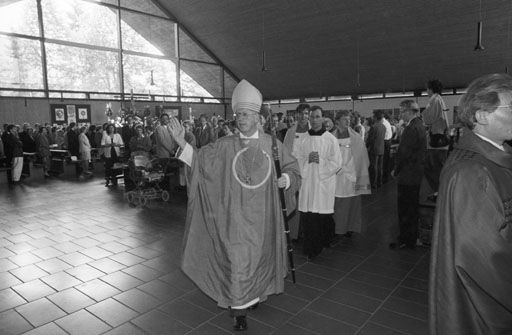
Engelbert Siebler

Engelbert Siebler (29 May 1937 – 11 October 2018) was a German Roman Catholic bishop.

Siebler was born in Germany and was ordained to the priesthood in 1963. He served as titular bishop of Tela and as auxiliary bishop of the Roman Catholic Archdiocese of Munich and Freising, Germany, from 1986 until 2012.
