= Devarick Scandrett =

American football player (1984–2018)

Profile
- Position: Defensive end

Personal information
- Born: January 23, 1984
- Died: October 15, 2018 (aged 34)
- Listed height: 6 ft 4 in (1.93 m)
- Listed weight: 302 lb (137 kg)

Career information
- High school: Mary Persons (Forsyth, Georgia)
- College: Middle Tennessee State

Career history
- Green Bay Packers (2007)

Devarick Lontreal Scandrett (January 23, 1984 – October 15, 2018) was an American football defensive end for the Green Bay Packers of the NFL. He played college football for Middle Tennessee State University.

== Career ==
In 2007, Scandrett signed with the Green Bay Packers.

== Later life and death ==
Scandrett died on October 15, 2018.
