= 2018 in New Zealand =

- Decades: 1990s; 2000s; 2010s; 2020s
- See also: History of New Zealand; List of years in New Zealand; Timeline of New Zealand history

The following lists events that happened during 2018 in New Zealand.

== Population ==
- Estimated population as of 31 December 2018 – 4,886,100
- Increase since 31 December 2017 – 80,700 (1.68%)
- Males per 100 females – 96.8

== Incumbents ==
=== Regal and vice-regal ===
- Head of State – Elizabeth II
- Governor-General – Patsy Reddy
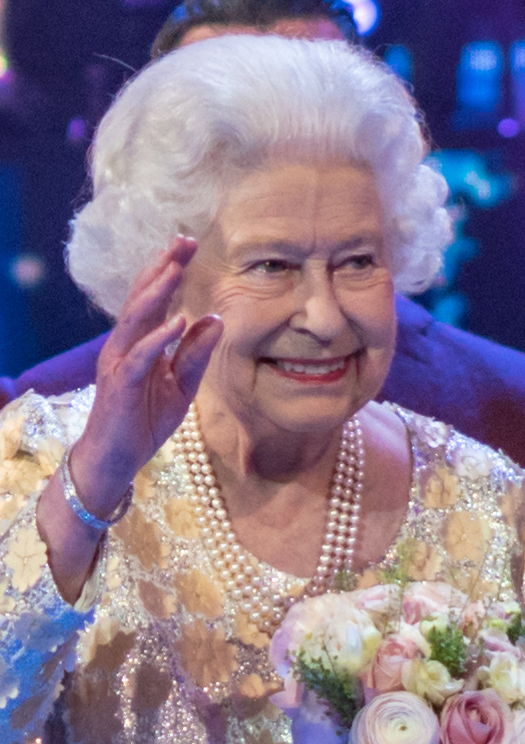
Elizabeth II

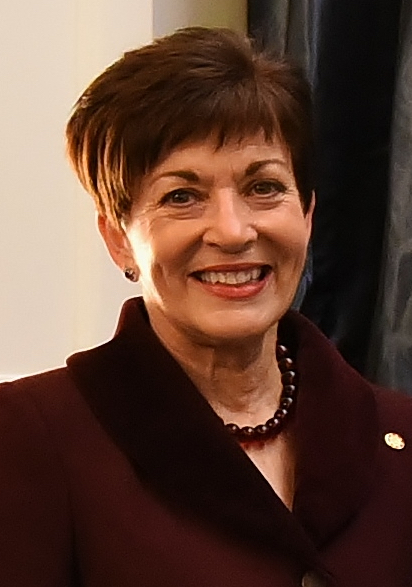
Patsy Reddy

=== Government ===
2018 is the first full year of the 52nd Parliament, which first sat on 7 November 2017.

The Sixth Labour Government, elected in 2017, continues.

- Speaker of the House – Trevor Mallard
- Prime Minister – Jacinda Ardern
- Deputy Prime Minister – Winston Peters
- Leader of the House – Chris Hipkins
- Minister of Finance – Grant Robertson
- Minister of Foreign Affairs – Winston Peters
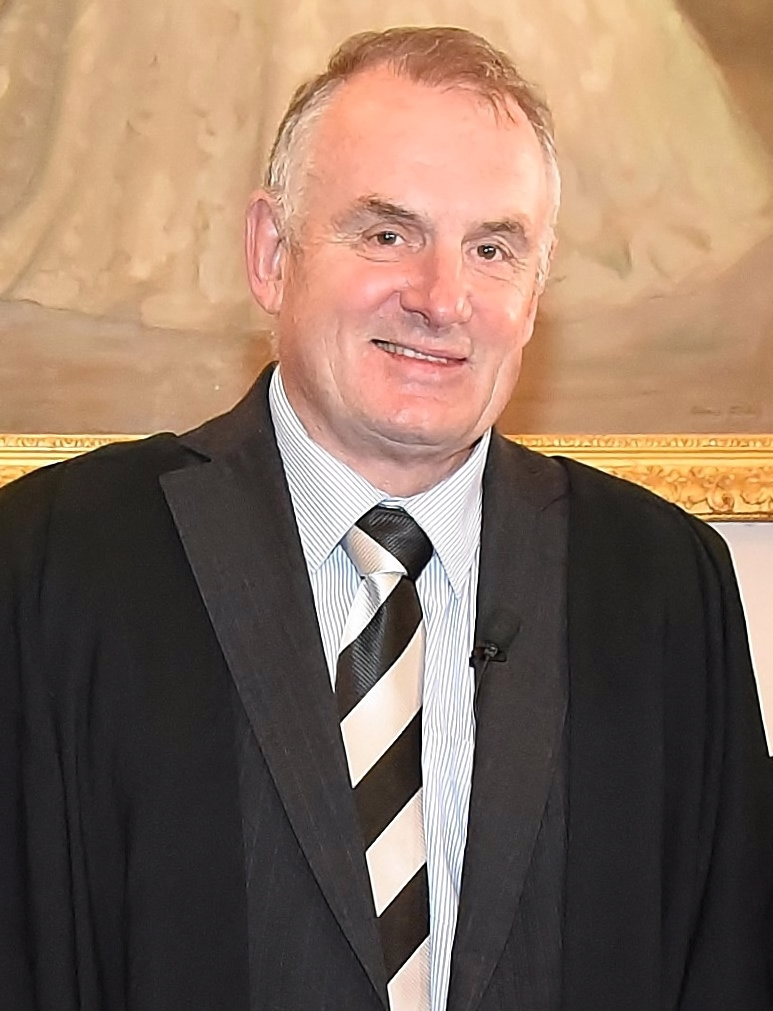
Trevor Mallard

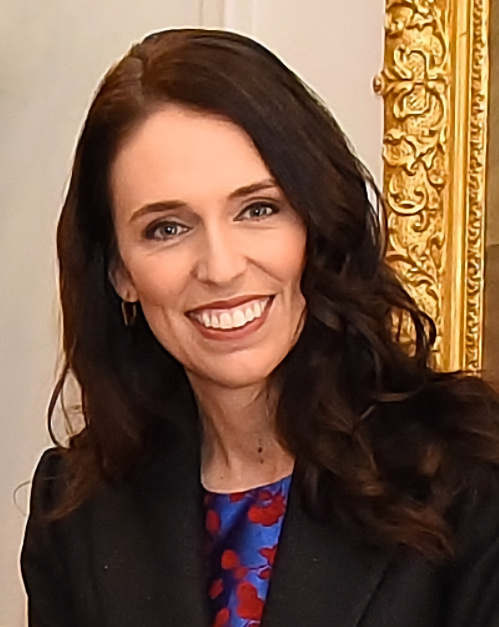
Jacinda Ardern

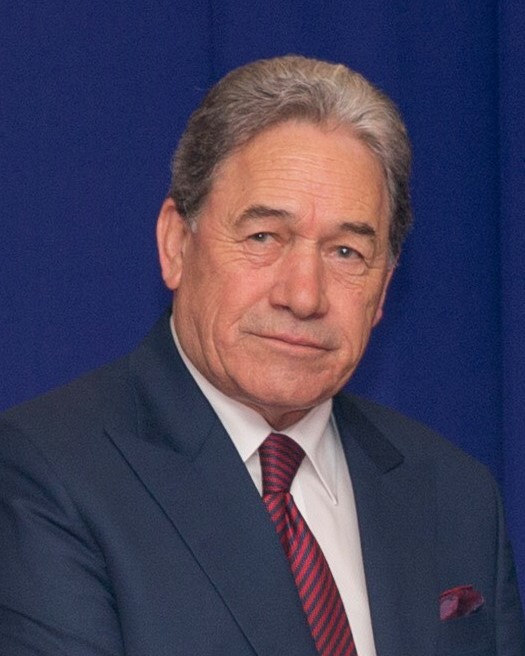
Winston Peters

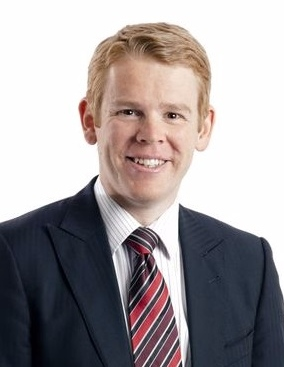
Chris Hipkins

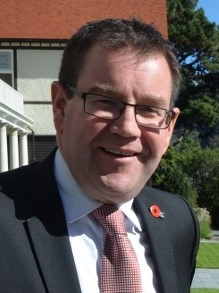
Grant Robertson

=== Other party leaders in parliament ===
- National – Bill English until 27 February, then Simon Bridges (Leader of the Opposition)
- New Zealand First – Winston Peters
- Green – James Shaw and, from 8 April, Marama Davidson
- ACT New Zealand – David Seymour
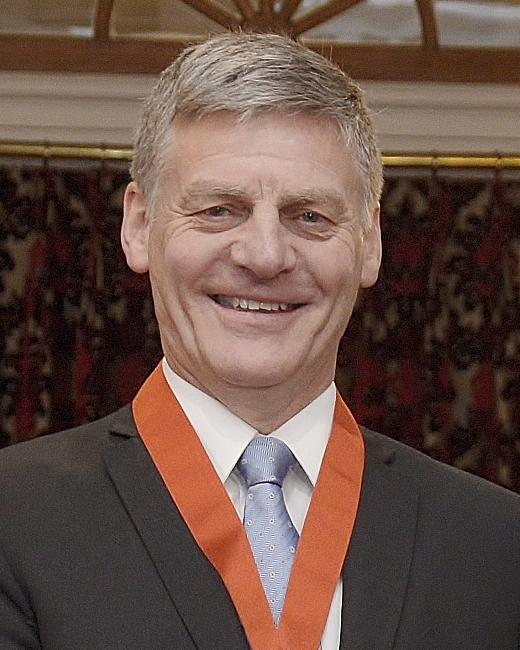
Bill English

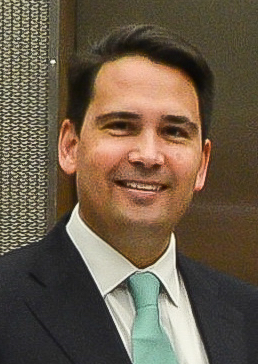
Simon Bridges

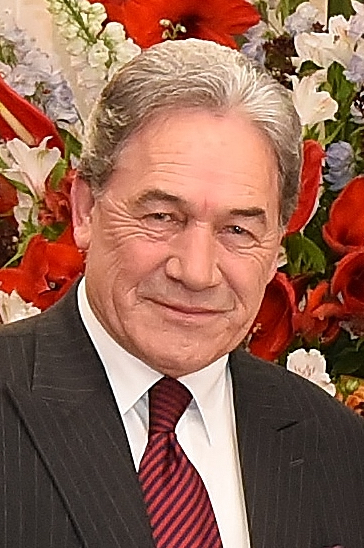
Winston Peters

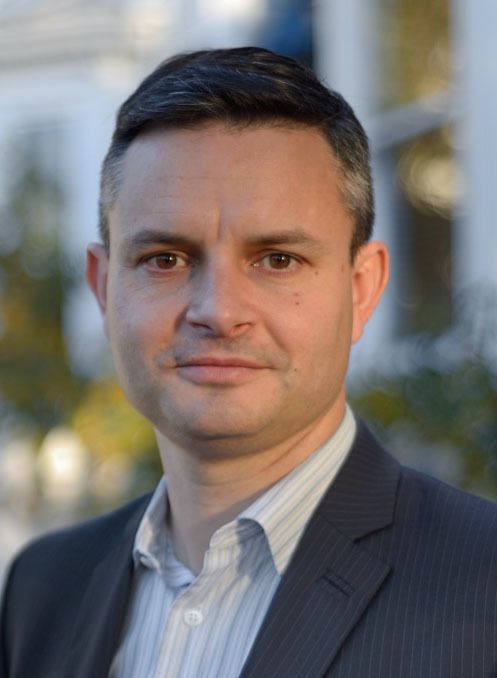
James Shaw

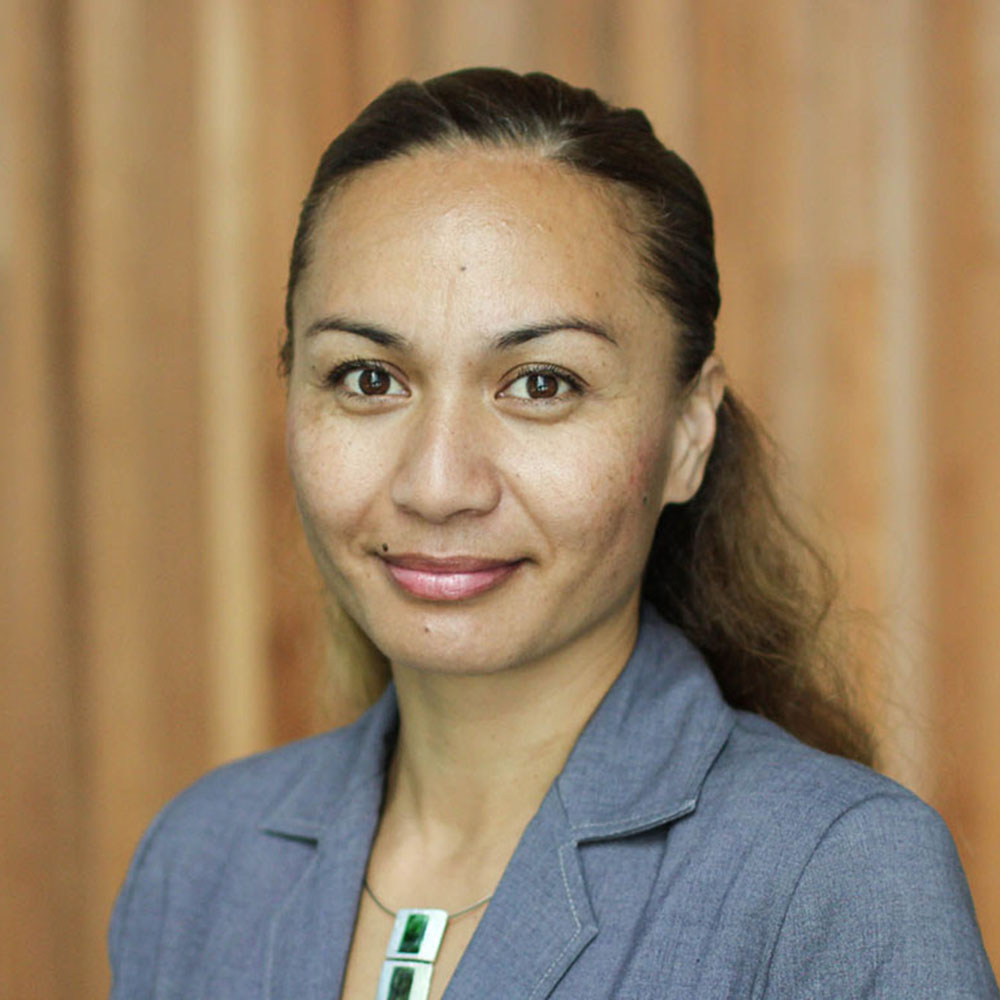
Marama Davidson

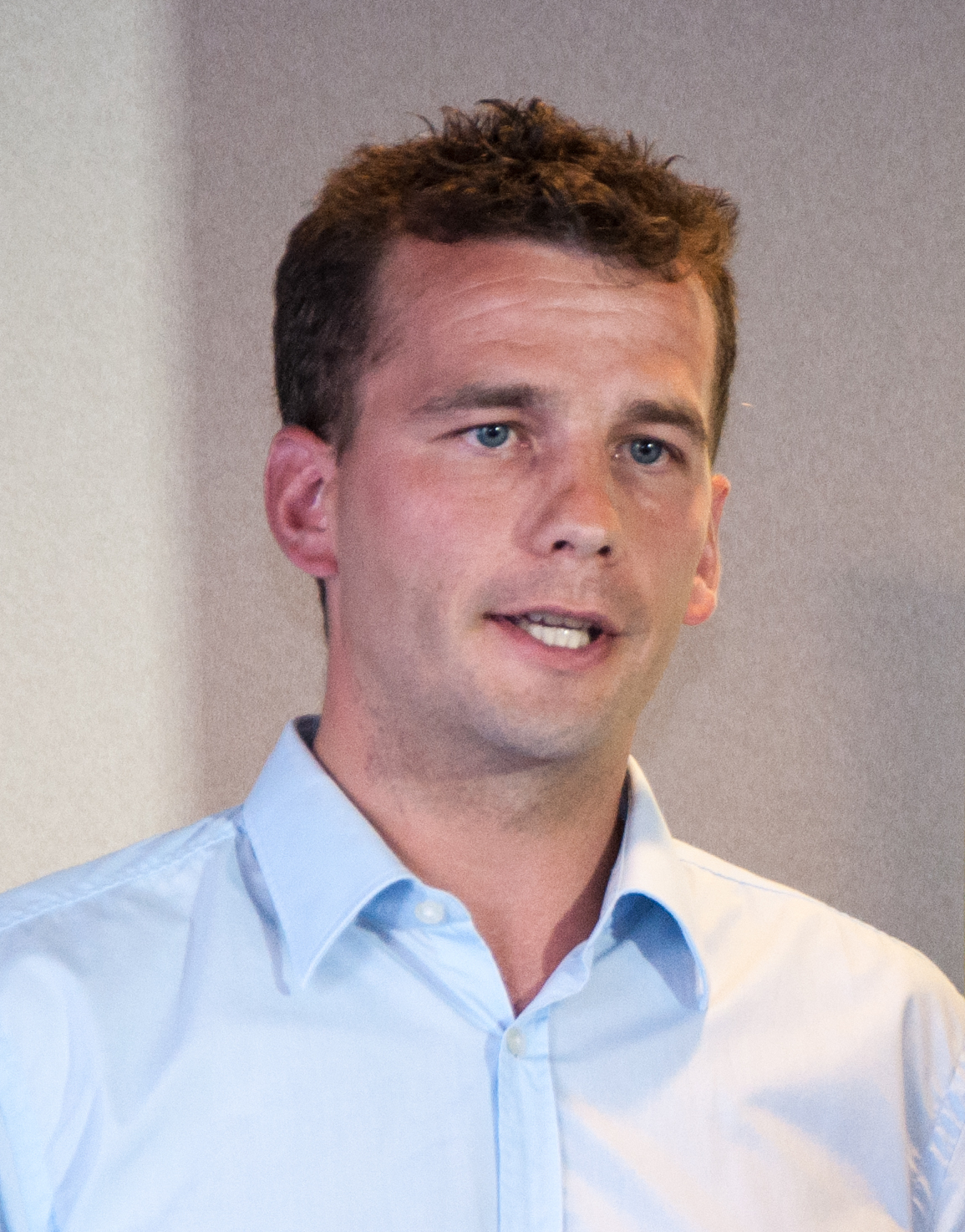
David Seymour

=== Judiciary ===
- Chief Justice – Sian Elias
- President of the Court of Appeal – Stephen Kós
- Chief High Court judge – Geoffrey Venning
- Chief District Court judge – Jan-Marie Doogue
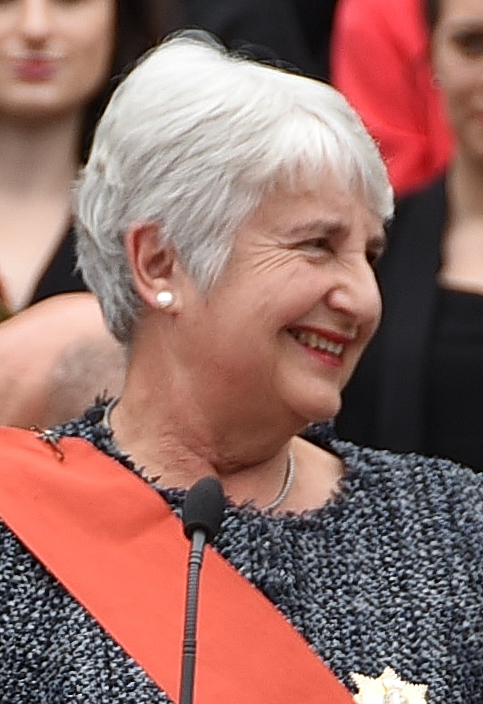
Sian Elias

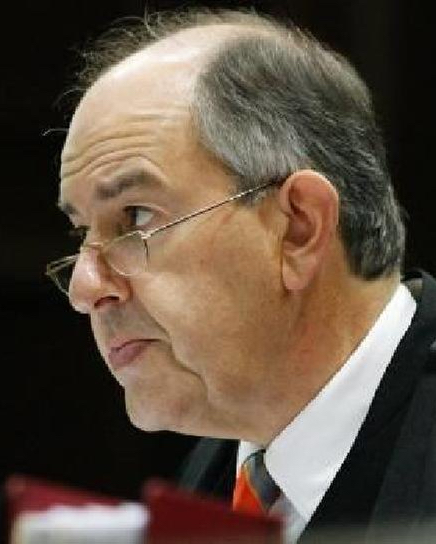
Stephen Kós

=== Main centre leaders ===
- Mayor of Auckland – Phil Goff
- Mayor of Tauranga – Greg Brownless
- Mayor of Hamilton – Andrew King
- Mayor of Wellington – Justin Lester
- Mayor of Christchurch – Lianne Dalziel
- Mayor of Dunedin – Dave Cull
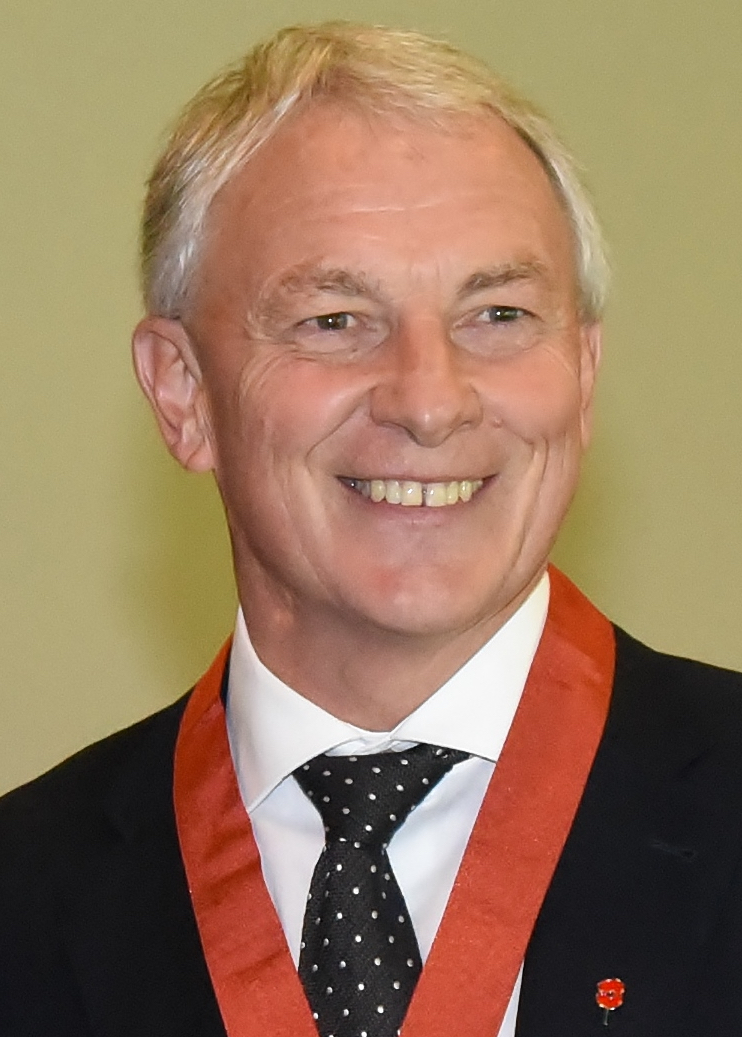
Phil Goff

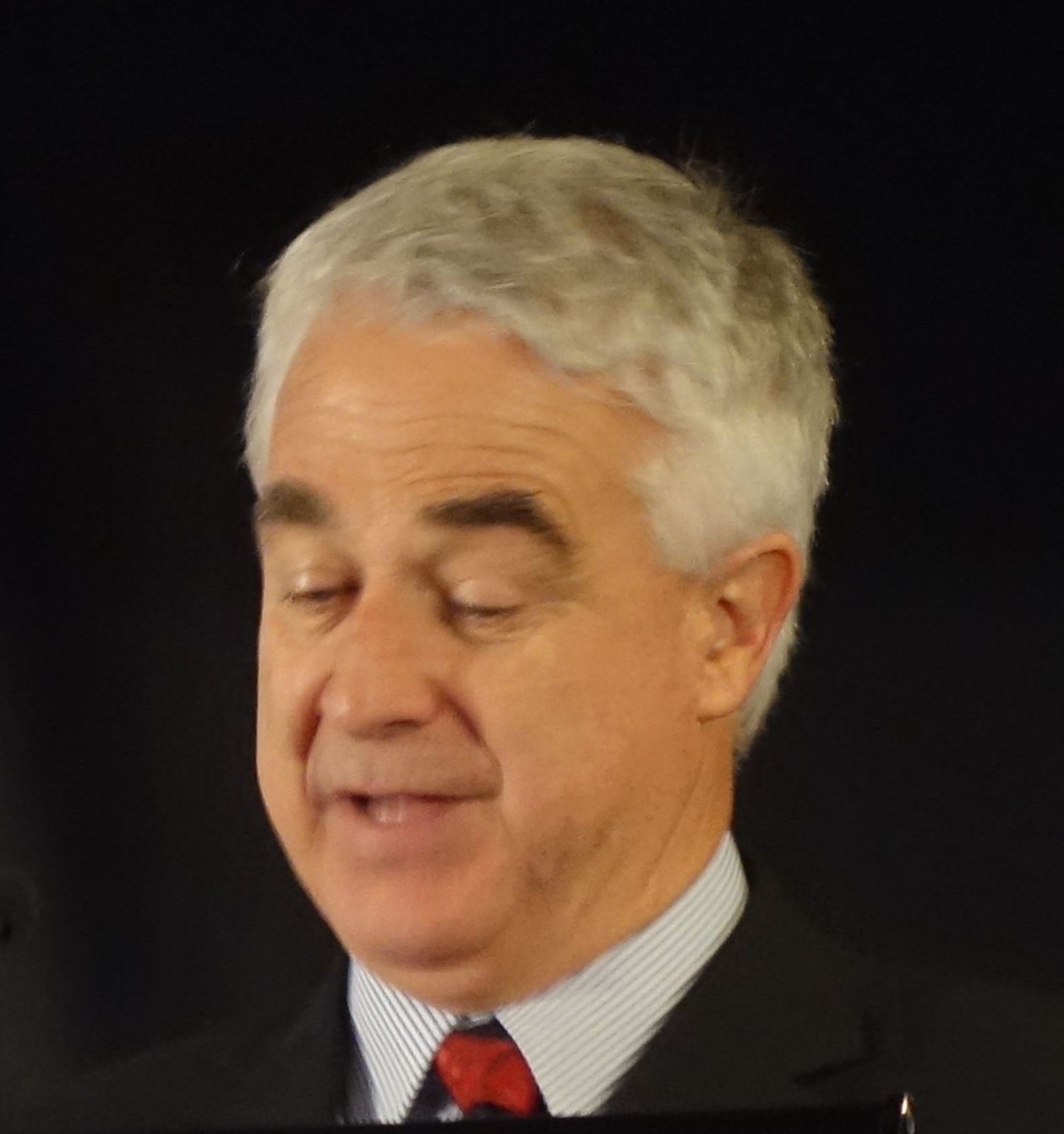
Greg Brownless

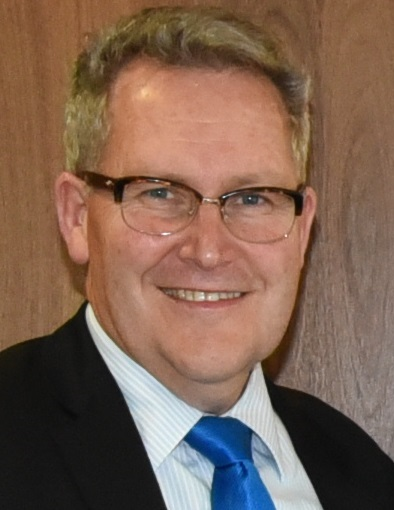
Andrew King

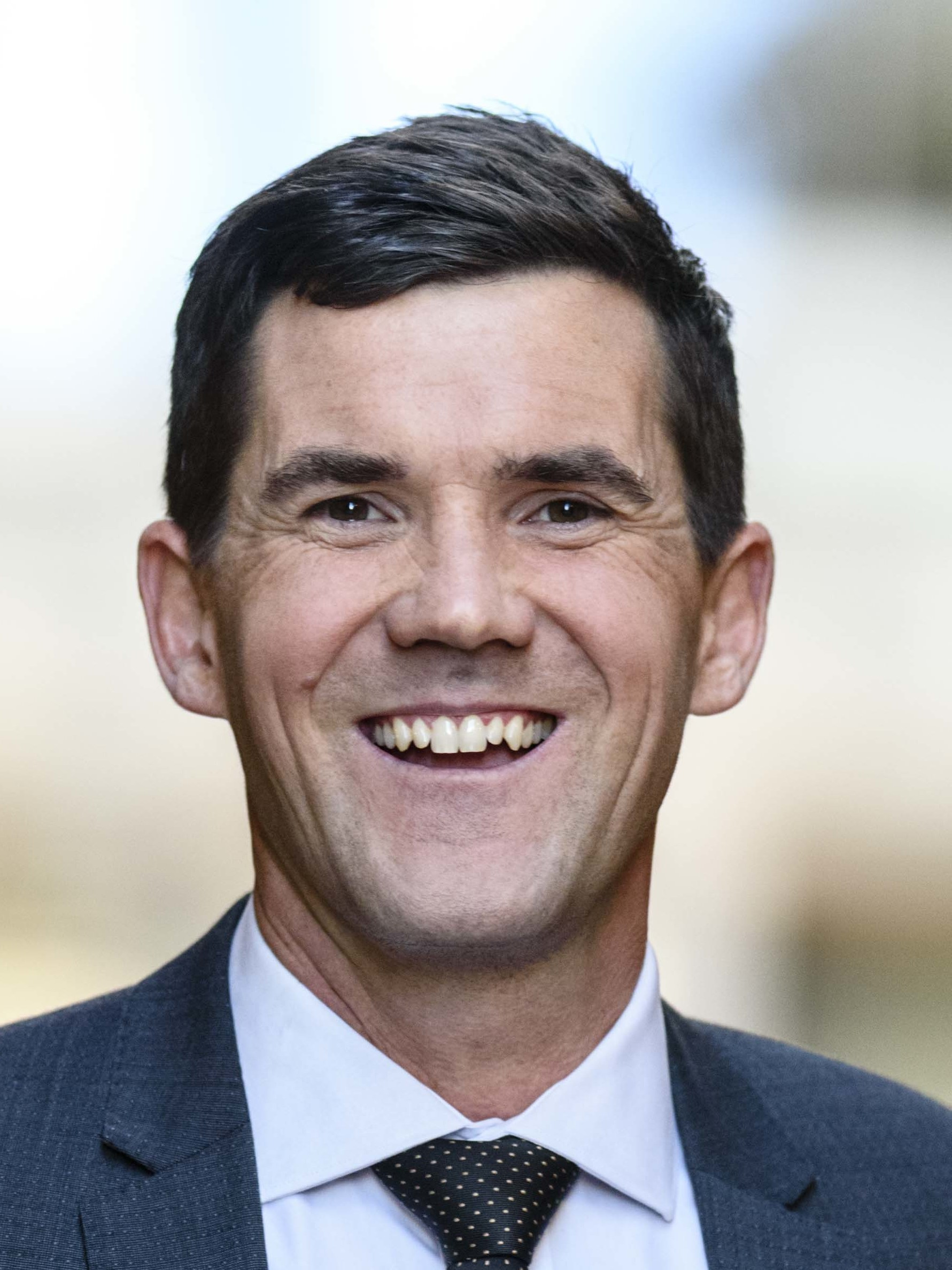
Justin Lester

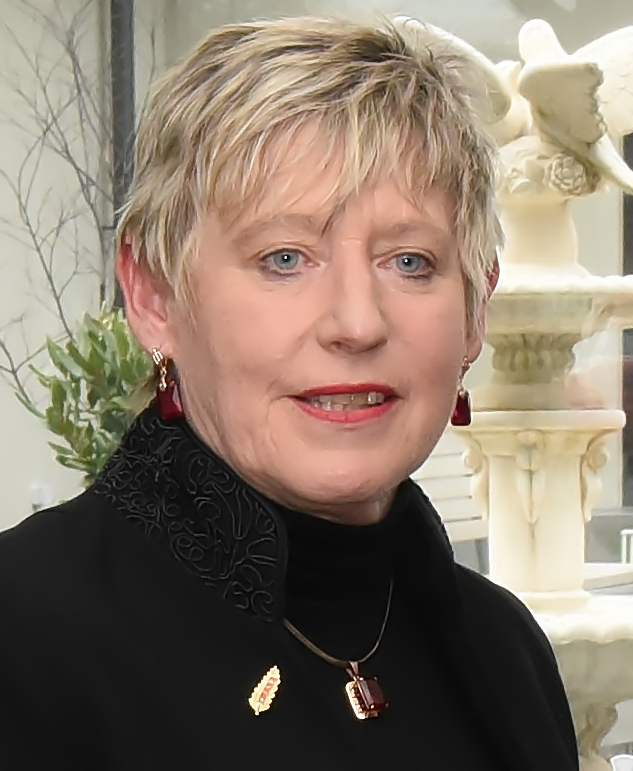
Lianne Dalziell

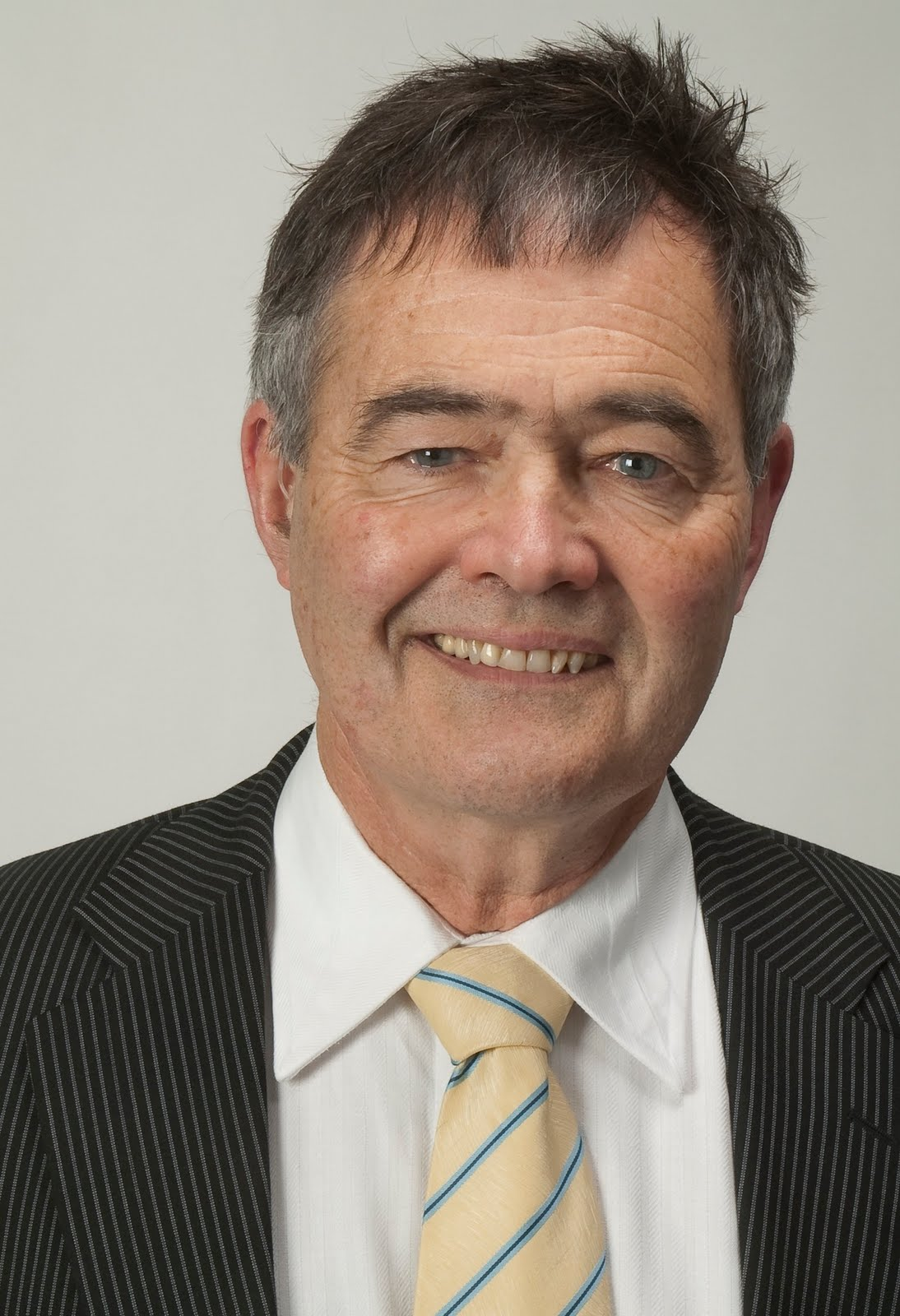
Dave Cull

== Events ==
=== January ===
- 31 January – Christchurch's Re:START container mall closes.

=== February ===
- 3 February – Murder of Amber-Rose Rush, a Dunedin teenager. A doctor named Venod Skantha is charged with her murder.

=== March ===
- 6 March – The 2018 New Zealand census is held.

=== April ===
- 12 April - The New Zealand Government announces it will ban future offshore oil and gas exploration in New Zealand.

=== May ===
- 2 May – Australian-based video rental chain Video Ezy pulls out of New Zealand, citing competition from online streaming services and video piracy.
- 11 May – A wave of about 24 metres (79 ft) height, the highest ever recorded, is observed near Campbell Island south of New Zealand; the previous record wave in 2012 was about 22 metres (72 ft).
- 17 May – The 2018 New Zealand budget is presented to Parliament by the Minister of Finance, Grant Robertson.
- 19 May – A yellow bow is placed on the Big Lemon & Paeroa bottle to celebrate its 50th birthday.
- 29 May – A state of emergency is declared in Ngongotaha and Rotorua District due to extreme weather and flooding.

=== June ===
- 4 June – The 2018 Queen's Birthday Honours are announced.
- 9 June – The Northcote by-election is won by National, who retain the seat.

=== July ===
- 3 July – The primary teachers' union New Zealand Educational Institute announces strike action on 15 August after the Ministry of Education rejected their demand for a 16% pay rise.
- 9 July – 4,000 Inland Revenue and the Ministry of Business, Innovation and Employment (MBIE) workers go on strike for two hours demanding higher salaries.
- 12 July – 30,000 nurses went on strike for 24 hours after the New Zealand Nurses Organisation rejected the government's offer of a 12.5% pay rise.

=== August ===
- 7 August – Nurses accepted a pay offer from district health boards including pay rights and a commitment to pay equity by the end of next year.
- 15 August – Parliament passes the Overseas Investment Amendment Act 2018, which bans the sale of existing homes to most non-resident foreigners

=== October ===
- 30 October – Parliament is suspended after a magnitude 6.2 earthquake strikes south-west of Taumarunui.

=== December ===
- 1 or 2 December – Murder of Grace Millane, a British tourist. A 26-year-old man is charged with her murder on 8 December.
- 31 December – The 2019 New Year Honours are announced.

== Sports ==
=== Commonwealth Games ===
- New Zealand sends a team of 253 competitors in 17 sports.

| Gold | Silver | Bronze | Total |
|---|---|---|---|
| 15 | 16 | 15 | 46 |

=== Olympic Games ===
- New Zealand sends a team of 21 competitors in five sports.

| Gold | Silver | Bronze | Total |
|---|---|---|---|
| 0 | 0 | 2 | 2 |

=== Paralympic Games ===
- New Zealand sends a team of three competitors in two sports.

| Gold | Silver | Bronze | Total |
|---|---|---|---|
| 1 | 0 | 2 | 3 |

=== Sailing ===
- 24 February – 18 March: Auckland is a stopover on the 2017–18 Volvo Ocean Race

=== Shooting ===
- Ballinger Belt – John Snowden (Ashburton)

=== Youth Olympics ===
- New Zealand sends a team of 61 competitors.

| Gold | Silver | Bronze | Total |
|---|---|---|---|
| 3 | 1 | 0 | 4 |

== Births ==
- 10 November – Asterix, Thoroughbred racehorse

== Deaths ==
=== January ===
- 4 January
  - Owen Hardy, World War II fighter pilot (born 1922).
  - Gail McIntosh, politician, MP for Lyttelton (1990–1993), Tauranga City Councillor (since 2013) (born 1955).
- 5 January
  - Barry Thomas, rugby union player (Auckland, Wellington, national team) (born 1937).
  - Peter Wells, Olympic (1952, 1956) and British Empire and Commonwealth Games (1950, 1954) high jumper (born 1929).
- 7 January
  - Jim Anderton, politician, MP for Sydenham (1984–1996) and Wigram (1996–2011), Labour Party president (1979–1984), NewLabour Party leader (1989–2000), Alliance leader (1991–1994, 1995–2002), Progressive Party leader (2002–2012), Deputy Prime Minister (1999–2002) (born 1938).
  - Buster Stiggs, musician (Suburban Reptiles, The Swingers, Models) (born 1954).
- 12 January – Richard Peterson, British Commonwealth Games fencer (1966, 1970), lawyer and sports administrator (born 1940).
- 17 January – Ted McCoy, architect (Otago Boys' High School redevelopment, Aquinas Hall, University College), president of the New Zealand Institute of Architects (1979–1980), NZIA Gold Medal (2002) (born 1925).
- 21 January – Michael Selby, geomorphologist (University of Waikato) (born 1936).
- 22 January
  - Jack Doms, swimmer, British Empire and Commonwealth Games champion and silver medallist (1954) (born 1927).
  - Kevin Tate, soil chemist and climate scientist (Soil Bureau, Landcare Research), Marsden Medal (2005), Fellow of the Royal Society of New Zealand (since 1995) (born 1943).
- 25 January – Graham Williams, rugby union player (Wellington, national team) (born 1945).
- 27 January – Grant Fell, musician (Headless Chickens) (born c. 1961).
- 31 January – Pat Booth, journalist (Auckland Star, North & South), editor (Zealandia), writer, and local-body politician, Far North District Councillor (2001–2003), Waitakere City Councillor (2004–2006) (born 1929).
- Late January – Nigel the gannet of Mana Island.
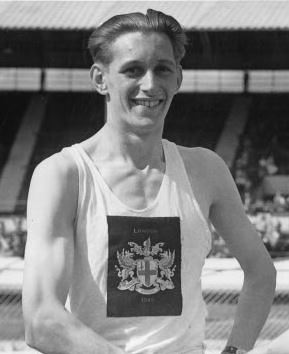
Peter Wells

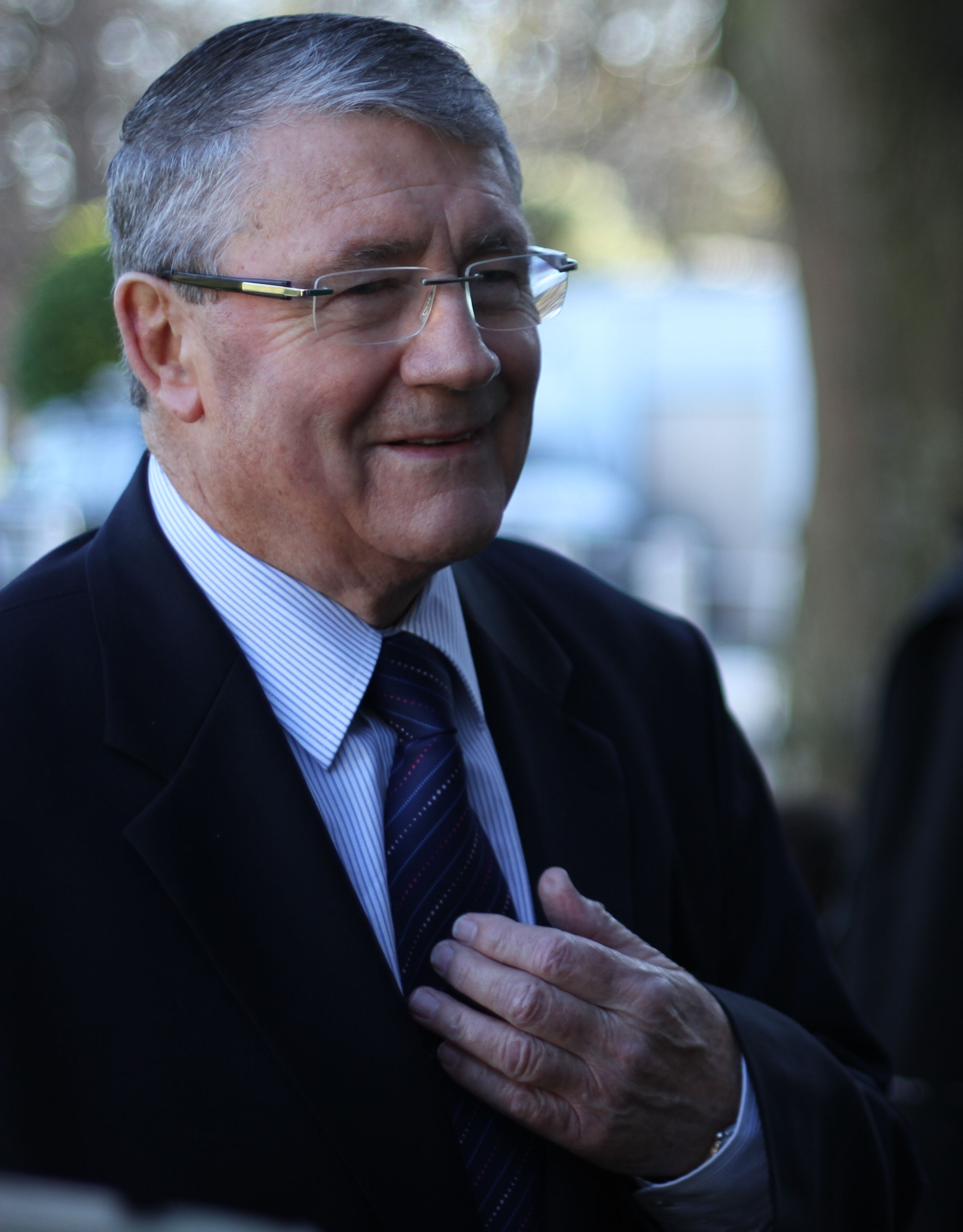
Jim Anderton

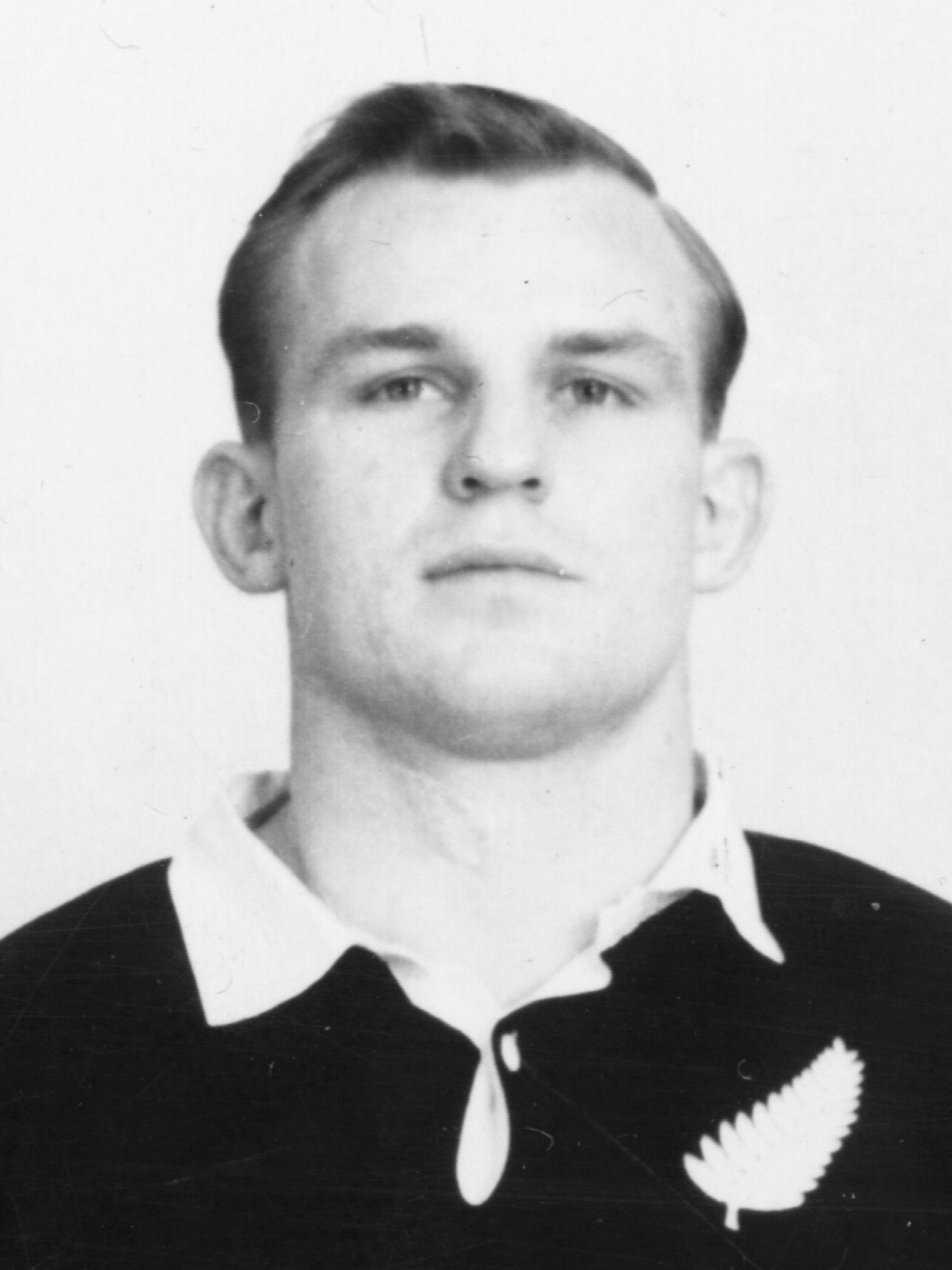
Graham Williams

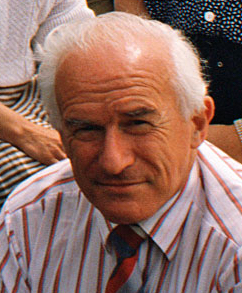
Pat Booth

=== February ===
- 3 February – Ted Corbett, organic chemist (University of Otago), Fellow of the Royal Society of New Zealand (since 1972) (born 1923).
- 6 February – Thomas, goose in Waikanae.
- 8 February – Gary Seear, rugby union player (Otago, national team) (born 1952).
- 10 February – Bevan Congdon, cricketer (Central Districts, Canterbury, national team) (born 1938).
- 11 February – Darien Boswell, Olympic rower (1964), British Empire and Commonwealth Games silver medallist (1962) (born 1938).
- 21 February – Beryl Fletcher, feminist novelist, Commonwealth Writers' Prize (South East Asia and South Pacific region) for best first book (1992) (born 1938).
- 25 February – Noel Scott, school teacher and politician, principal of Makoura College (1968–1975), MP for Tongariro (1984–1990), Minister for Sport and Recreation (1990) (born 1929).
- 27 February – Keith Murdoch, rugby union player (Otago, Hawke's Bay, national team) (born 1943).

=== March ===
- 2 March – Gordon Challis, poet (born 1932).
- 9 March – Robin Archer, rugby union player (Otago, Southland, national team) and coach (Southland) (born 1930).
- 11 March – Paddy Donovan, Olympic boxer (1956, 1964) and British Empire and Commonwealth Games bronze medallist (1958, 1962), rugby union player (Hawke's Bay) (born 1936).
- 14 March
  - Peter Entwisle, art historian and curator (Dunedin Public Art Gallery), writer, and heritage advocate (born 1948).
  - Mac McCallion, rugby union player (Counties, New Zealand Māori) and coach (Counties Manukau, Fiji) (born 1950).
- 20 March – Dylan Mika, rugby union player (Auckland, Blues, Samoa, national team) (born 1972).
- 28 March – Norm Wilson, cricketer (Northern Districts, Northland) and cricket administrator, groundsman (Cobham Oval) (born 1931).
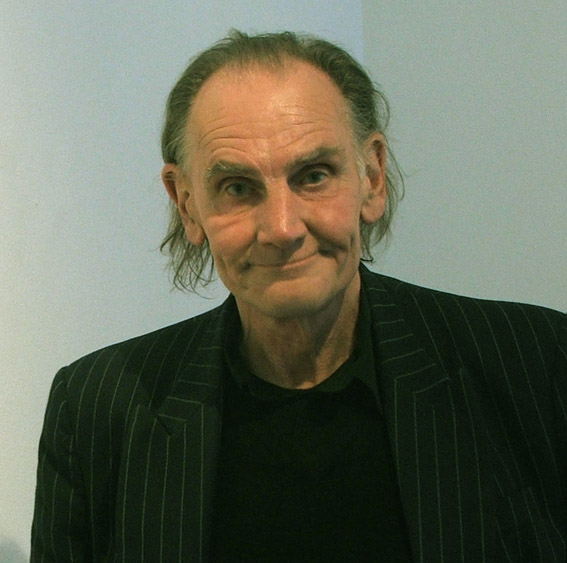
Peter Entwisle

=== April ===
- 6 April – Colin McLeod, civil engineer, Commissioner of Works (1973–1981) (born 1921).
- 10 April – Fergie McCormick, rugby union player (Canterbury, national team) (born 1939).
- 11 April – Robert Matthews, Hall of Fame athlete, octuple Paralympic champion (1984, 1988, 1992, 2000) (born 1961).
- 16 April – Ivan Mauger, Hall of Fame motorcycle speedway rider, speedway world champion (1968, 1969, 1970, 1972, 1977, 1979), long-track world champion (1971, 1972, 1976), New Zealand Sportsman of the Year (1977, 1979) (born 1939).
- 23 April – Haddon Donald, soldier (2NZEF) and politician, MP for Wairarapa (1963–1969) (born 1917).
- 24 April – Arthur Eustace, athlete, athletics coach and administrator, British Empire Games bronze medallist (1950), New Zealand Amateur Athletic Association president (1984–1985), patron of Athletics New Zealand (since 2009), Halberg lifetime achievement award (2012) (born 1926).
- 25 April – Margo Buchanan-Oliver, marketing academic (University of Auckland) (born 1952).
- 26 April – David Mitchell, architect (Tauranga Art Gallery, Te Uru Waitākere Contemporary Gallery), writer and television presenter, NZIA Gold Medal (2005) (born 1941).
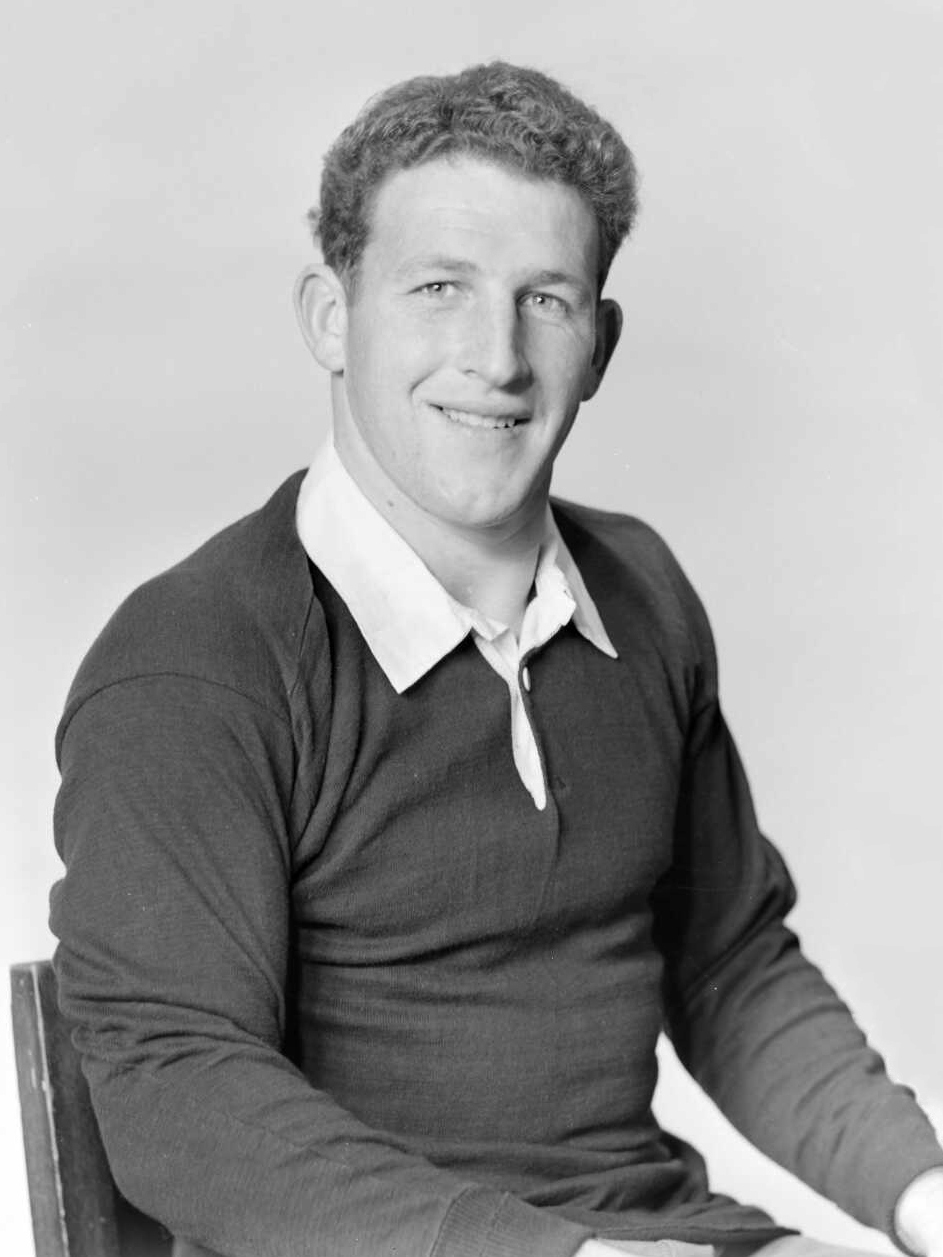
Fergie McCormick

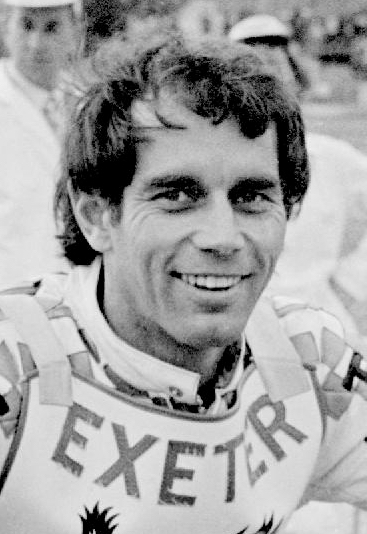
Ivan Mauger

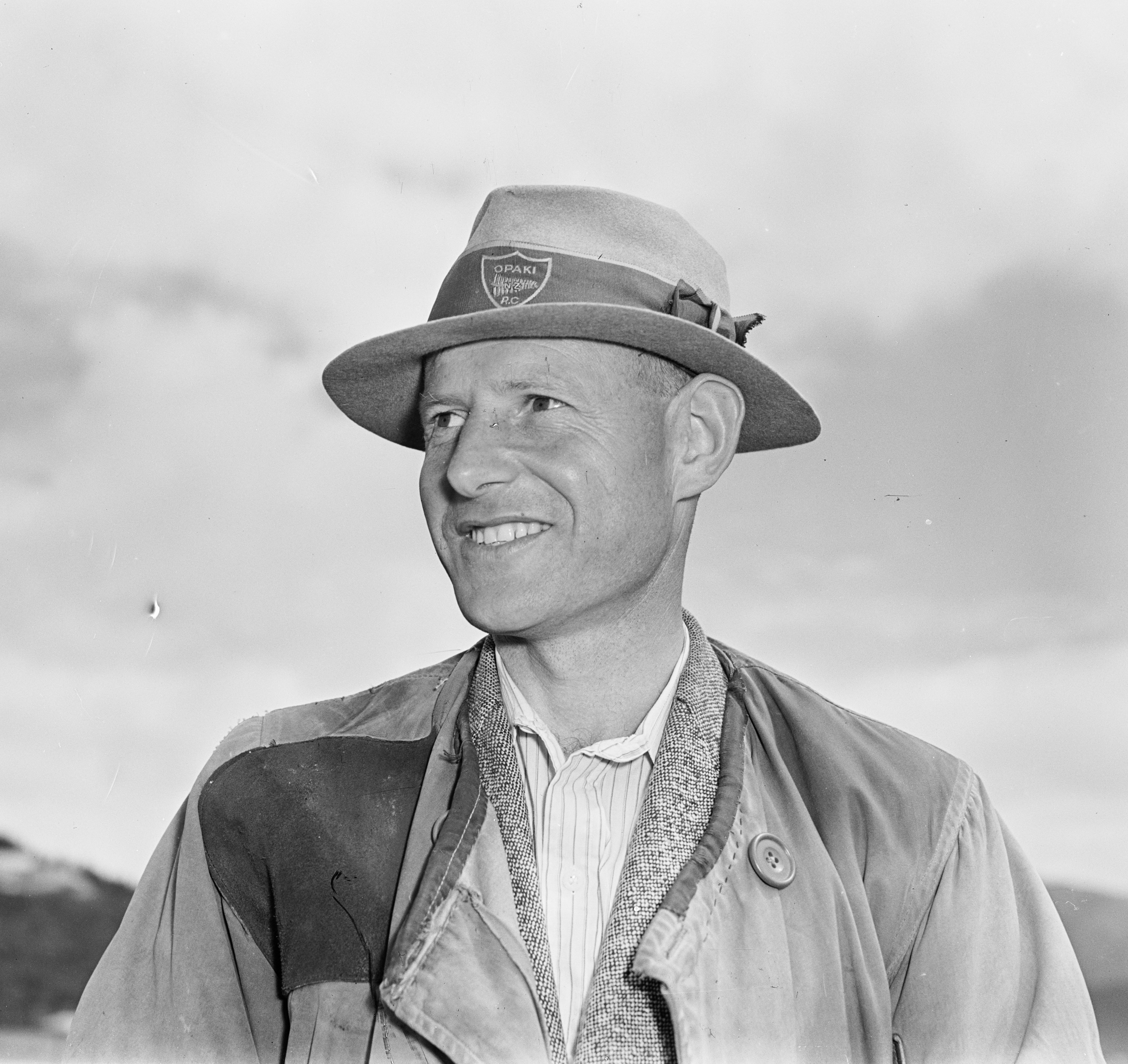
Haddon Donald

=== May ===
- 2 May – Katherine O'Regan, politician, Waipa County Councillor (1977–1985), MP for Waipa (1984–1996), National list MP (1996–1999), Minister of Consumer Affairs (1990–1996) (born 1946).
- 4 May – Tony Steel, rugby union player (Canterbury, national team), sprinter, educator and politician, headmaster of Hamilton Boys' High School (1979–1990), MP for Hamilton East (1990–1993, 1996–2002) (born 1941).
- 9 May
  - Norma, Lady Beattie – viceregal consort (1980–1985) (born 1925).
  - Carl Perkins, musician (House of Shem) (born c. 1959).
- 15 May – Hopeful Christian, founder of Gloriavale Christian Community (born 1926).
- 16 May – Tom Hadfield, rugby league player (Auckland, national team) (born 1934).
- 19 May – John Moorfield, Māori language academic (University of Waikato, University of Otago, Auckland University of Technology) (born 1943).
- 28 May – Dick Quax, Hall of Fame athlete and politician, Olympic silver medallist (1976), British Commonwealth Games silver medallist (1970), 5000 metres world record holder (1977–1978), Manukau City Councillor (2001–2007), Auckland Councillor (since 2011) (born 1948).
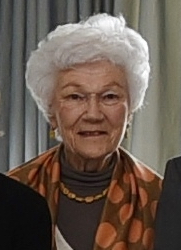
Norma, Lady Beattie

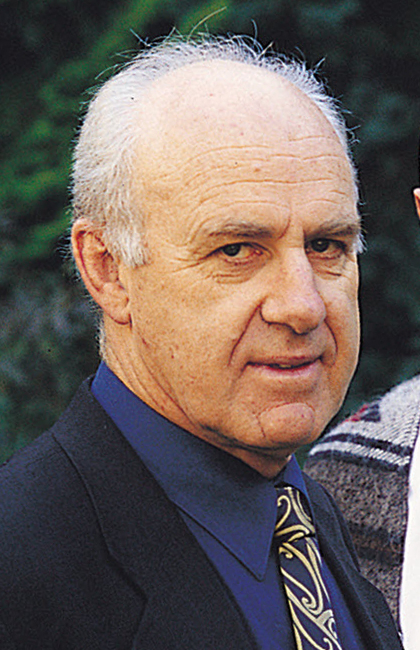
John Moorfield

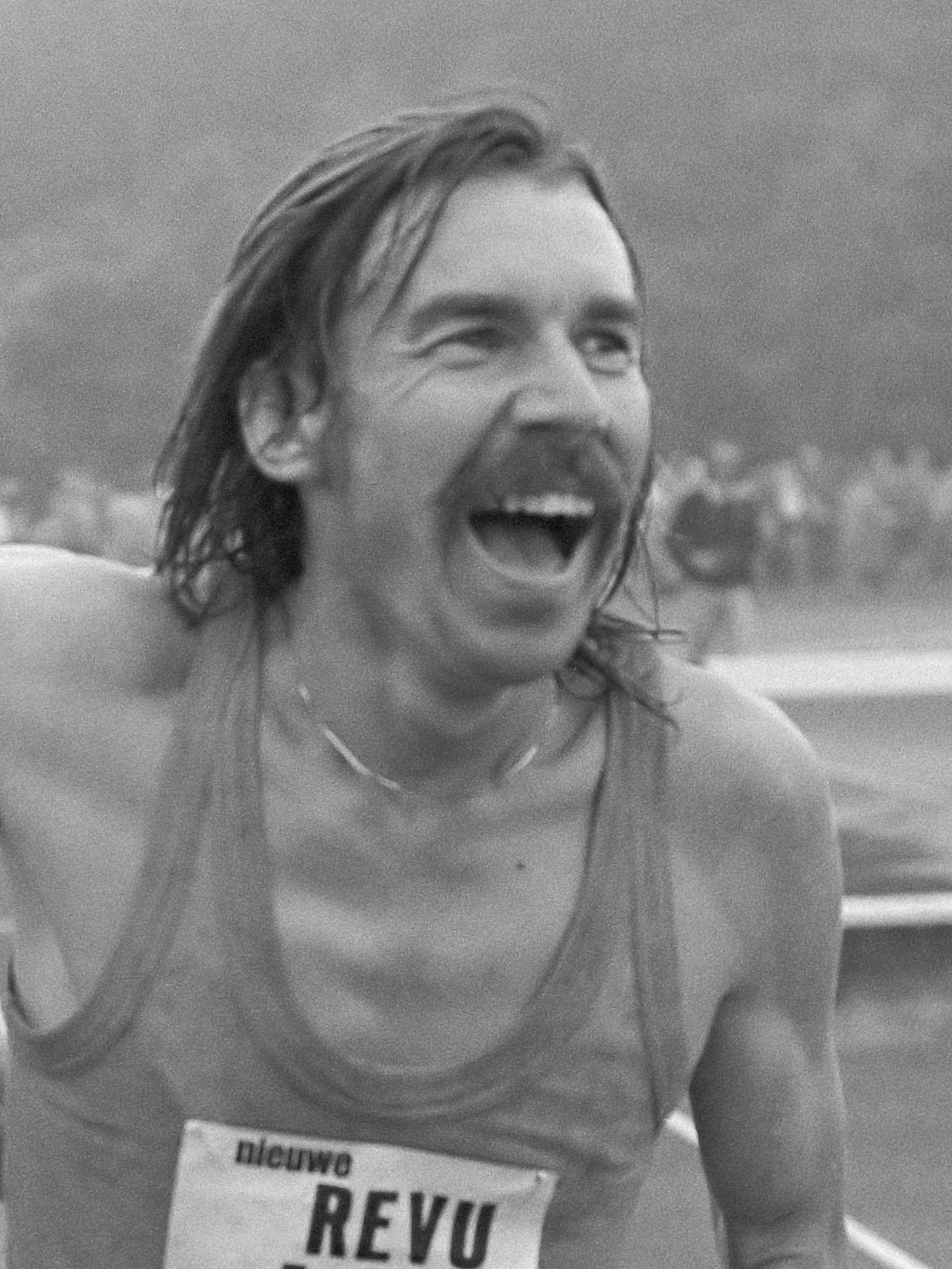
Dick Quax

=== June ===
- 4 June – J. B. Munro, politician and disability advocate, MP for Invercargill (1972–1975), Invercargill City Councillor (1971–1974, 1976–1977), national secretary / chief executive of IHC New Zealand (1977–1998) (born 1936).
- 7 June – Sir Neil Waters, inorganic chemist (University of Auckland) and academic administrator, vice-chancellor of Massey University (1983–1995), chair of the Foundation for Research, Science and Technology (1995–1998), chair of the New Zealand Qualifications Authority (1995–1999), Fellow of the Royal Society of New Zealand (since 1992) (born 1931).
- 13 June – Milan Mrkusich, artist and designer, Arts Foundation of New Zealand Icon (since 2003) (born 1925).
- 14 June
  - Vincent Gray, entertainer (The Alberts), physical chemist and climate-change denier, director of the Building Research Association of New Zealand (1970–1973) (born 1922).
  - Steve Kuzmicich, statistician, Government Statistician (1984–1991) (born 1931).
- 18 June – Graham Davy, athlete, sports administrator, president of the New Zealand Amateur Athletic Association (1976–1977), 1990 Commonwealth Games director of athletics (born 1936).
- 23 June – Koro Wētere, politician, MP for Western Maori (1969–1996), Minister of Maori Affairs (1984–1990) (born 1935).
- 30 June – Mark Irwin, rugby union player (Otago, Bay of Plenty, national team) (born 1935).
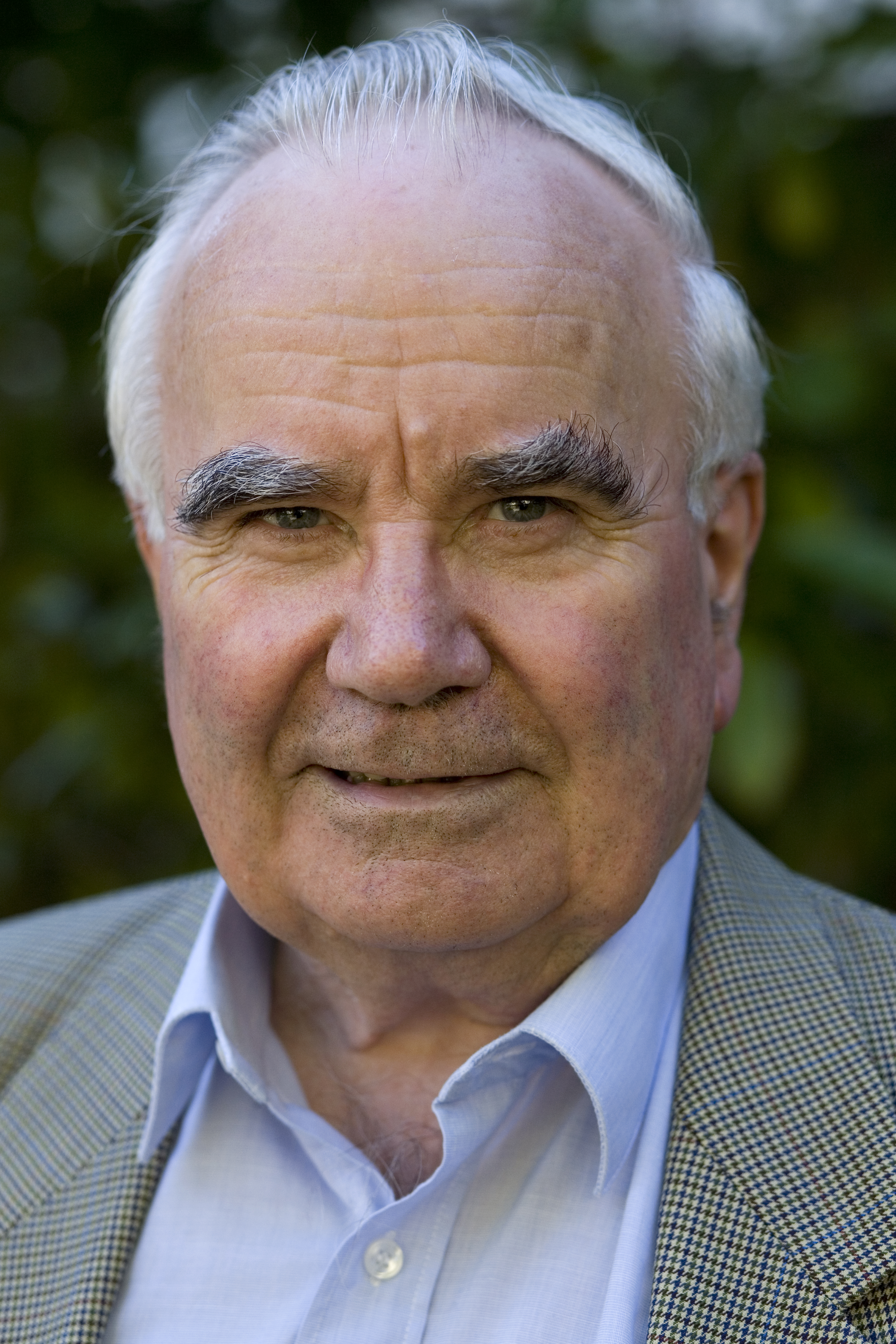
J. B. Munro

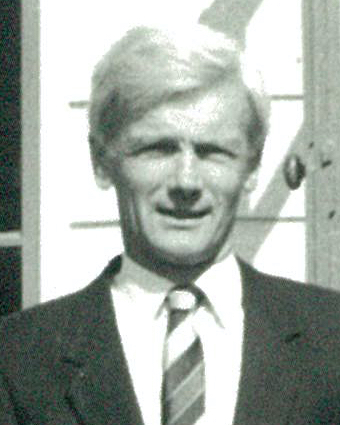
Sir Neil Waters

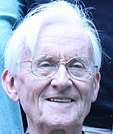
Vincent Gray

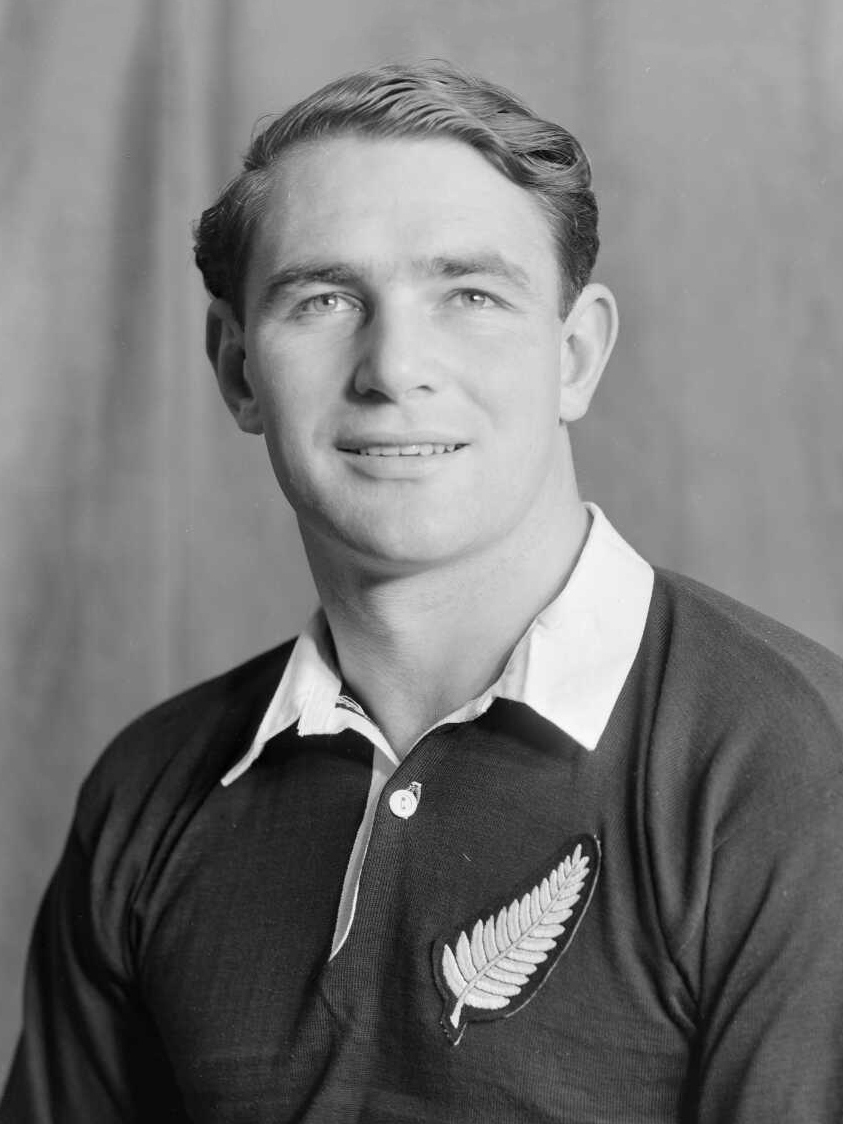
Mark Irwin

=== July ===
- 1 July – Merv Richards, pole vaulter, British Empire and Commonwealth Games bronze medallist (1958), gymnastics coach (Rowena Davis, Deborah Hurst), pole vault coach, and lapidarist (born 1930).
- 3 July – Gary Bold, physicist (University of Auckland) (born 1938).
- 4 July – Harry M. Miller, impresario and media agent (born 1934).
- 9 July
  - Sam Chisholm, media executive (Nine Network, BSkyB) (born 1939).
  - Colin Quincey, first person to row solo across the Tasman Sea (born 1945).
- 13 July – Naturalism, Thoroughbred racehorse, Australian Derby (1992), Rosehill Guineas (1992), Caulfield Stakes (1993) (foaled 1988).
- 14 July – Janet Holm, environmental activist, and historian (born 1923).
- 17 July – David Stevens, playwright (The Sum of Us), screenwriter (Breaker Morant, The Sum of Us, A Thousand Skies), director (A Town Like Alice, A Thousand Skies), and novelist (Queen: The Story of an American Family, Mama Flora's Family) (born 1940).
- 24 July – Rick Littlewood, Olympic judoka (1972) (born 1940).
- 29 July
  - Graham Finlay, Olympic (1956) and British Empire and Commonwealth Games (1958) boxer (born 1936).
  - Phillip Orchard, rugby league player (Bay of Plenty, Wellington, national team) (born 1948).

=== August ===
- 2 August – Bob Berry, dendrologist, founder of Hackfalls Arboretum, Veitch Memorial Medal (2015) (born 1916).
- 3 August
  - Reinhart Langer, botanist (Lincoln College) and university administrator, acting principal of Lincoln College (1984–1985), Fellow of the Royal Society of New Zealand (since 1972) (born 1921).
  - Murray Matthewson, orthopaedic surgeon (Addenbrooke's Hospital), president of the British Society for Surgery of the Hand (2003) (born 1944).
- 4 August – Delwyn Costello, cricketer (Canterbury, national team) (born 1960).
- 6 August – Helen Mackenzie, British Empire Games swimmer (1950), and bacteriologist (born 1930).
- 17 August – Warwick Roger, journalist and magazine editor, founder of Metro (born 1945).
- 18 August – Ronnie Moore, Hall of Fame speedway rider, individual world champion (1954, 1959), world pairs champion (1970) (born 1933).
- 19 August – Margaret Reid, first woman in New Zealand ordained as a Presbyterian minister, moderator of the general assembly of the Presbyterian Church of Aotearoa New Zealand (1987) (born 1923).
- 20 August – Greg Boyed, television presenter (TVNZ) (born 1970).
- 21 August – Spencer P. Jones, musician (The Johnnys, Beasts of Bourbon) (born 1956).
- 23 August – Wendy Hutton, travel and food writer (born 1940).
- 30 August – Jack Garrick, ichthyologist (Victoria University of Wellington) (born 1928).
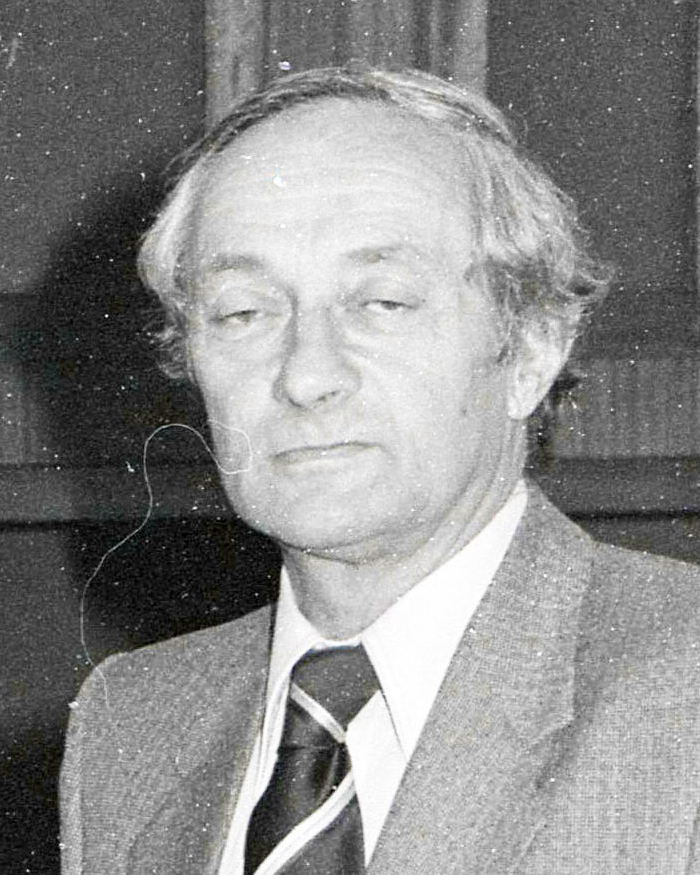
Reinhart Langer

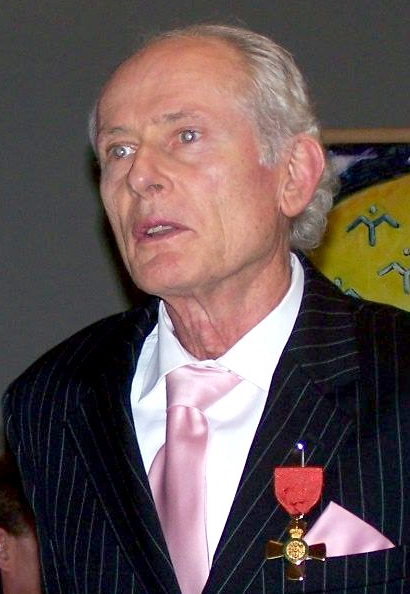
Warwick Roger

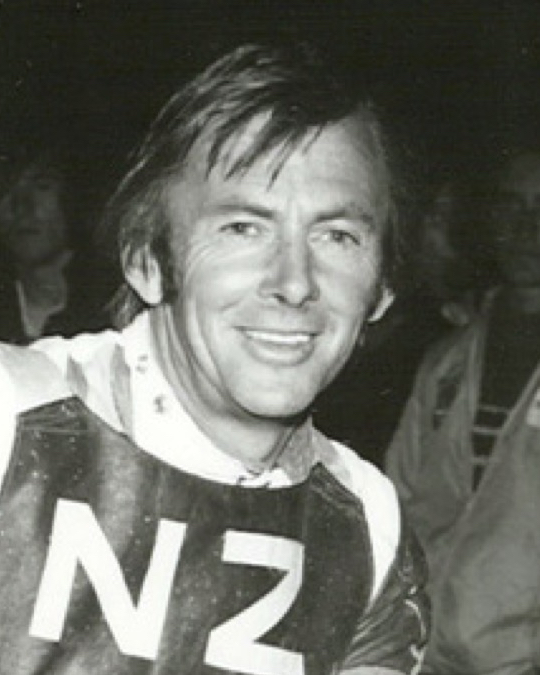
Ronnie Moore

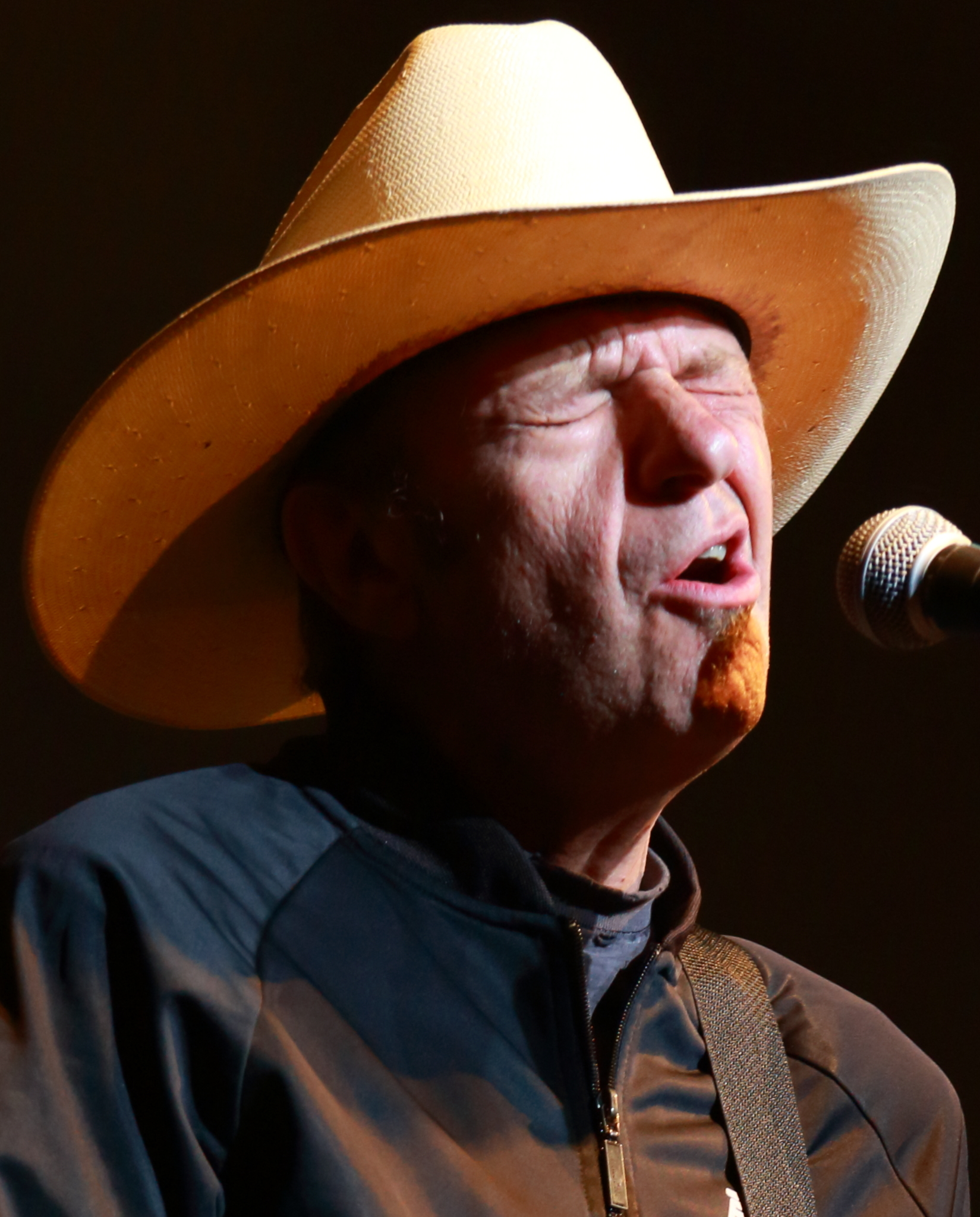
Spencer P. Jones

=== September ===
- 5 September
  - Alan Peart, World War II fighter ace (No. 610 Squadron, No. 81 Squadron) (born 1922).
  - John Stacpoole, heritage architect (Ewelme Cottage, Alberton, Mission House), architectural historian, and bibliophile (born 1919).
- 7 September – John O'Sullivan, rugby league player (Auckland, Wellington, national team) (born 1950).
- 14 September – Ruth Dowman, long jumper and sprinter, British Empire Games bronze medallist (1950) (born 1930).
- 16 September – Assid Corban, businessman (Corbans Wines) and politician, Mayor of Henderson (1974–1989), Mayor of Waitakere City (1989–1992), Waitakere City Councillor (1998–2001, 2007–2010) (born 1925).
- 22 September – Hayden Poulter, convicted serial killer (born 1961).
- 24 September – Merv Smith, radio personality (1ZB), and railway enthusiast (born 1933).
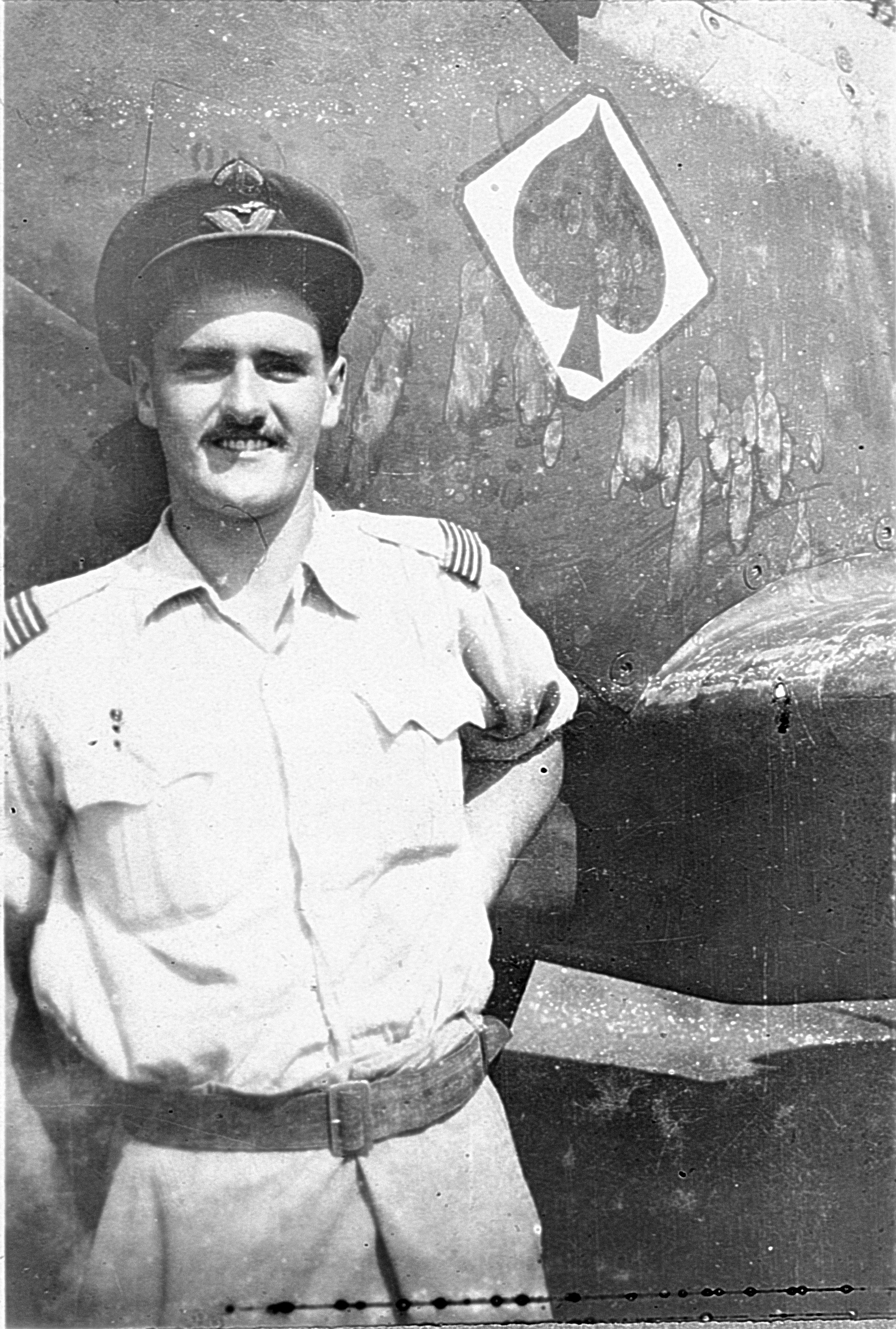
Alan Peart

=== October ===
- 2 October – Barry Linton, comic artist (born 1947).
- 3 October – David Fergusson, psychologist (University of Otago, Christchurch), founder of the Christchurch Health and Development Study, Fellow of the Royal Society of New Zealand (since 2006) (born 1944).
- 4 October
  - Penny Bright, activist (born 1954).
  - Barrie Frost, psychologist and neuroscientist (Queen's University at Kingston), Fellow of the Royal Society of Canada (since 1990) (born c. 1939).
- 6 October – Wilf Malcolm, mathematician (Victoria University of Wellington) and university administrator, vice-chancellor of the University of Waikato (1985–1994) (born 1933).
- 13 October – Bob Doran, computer scientist and computing historian (Massey University, University of Auckland) (born 1944).
- 14 October – Tom Delahunty, association football referee, FIFA international referee (1968–1984) (born 1935).
- 17 October
  - Denis Adam, insurance broker, art collector and philanthropist (Adam Art Gallery) (born 1924).
  - Sir Ngātata Love, Māori leader (Te Āti Awa), local-body politician, public servant, business development academic (Victoria University of Wellington, Massey University), and convicted fraudster, Petone Borough Councillor (1965–1968), Te Puni Kōkiri chief executive officer (1995–2000) (born 1937).
  - Sir Thomas Thorp, lawyer and jurist, High Court judge (1979–1995) (born 1925).
- 19 October – Sir John McGrath, lawyer and jurist, Queen's Counsel (since 1987), Solicitor-General (1989–2000), Court of Appeal judge (2000–2005), Supreme Court judge (2005–2015) (born 1945).
- 24 October – Keith Hunter, marine and freshwater chemist (University of Otago), Marsden Medal (2014), Fellow of the Royal Society of New Zealand (since 1997) (born 1951).
- 27 October – Murray Khouri, clarinettist (Royal Ballet Orchestra, NZBC Symphony Orchestra, Australia Ensemble), clarinet lecturer (Canberra School of Music), and broadcaster (BBC, Radio New Zealand) (born 1941).
- 29 October
  - Peter Hawes, television presenter and scriptwriter (A Week of It), actor, playwright, and novelist, best performance in a short film (2011 Aotearoa Film & Television Awards) (born 1947).
  - June Kerr, ballerina (Royal New Zealand Ballet) (born 1932).
- 31 October
  - Sir Thomas Eichelbaum, lawyer and jurist, Chief Justice (1989–1999), president of the New Zealand Law Society (1980–1982), Queen's Counsel (since 1978), Privy Counsellor (since 1989) (born 1931).
  - Maurice Mahoney, architect (Christchurch Town Hall, Michael Fowler Centre), Distinguished Fellow of the New Zealand Institute of Architects (since 2017) (born 1929).
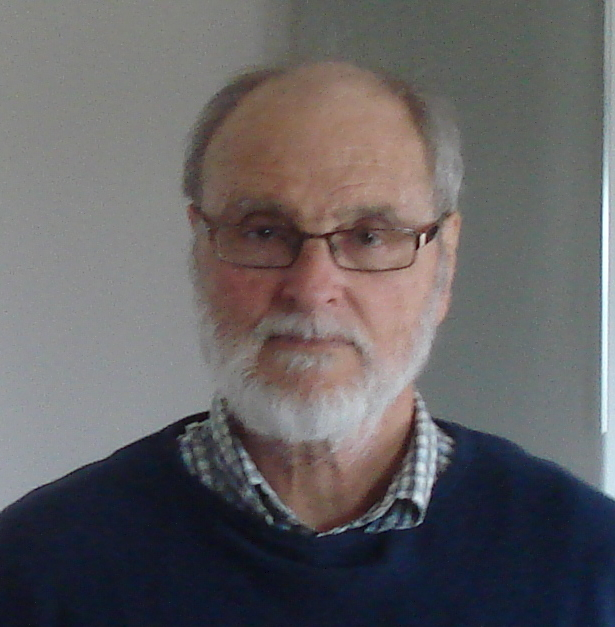
Bob Doran

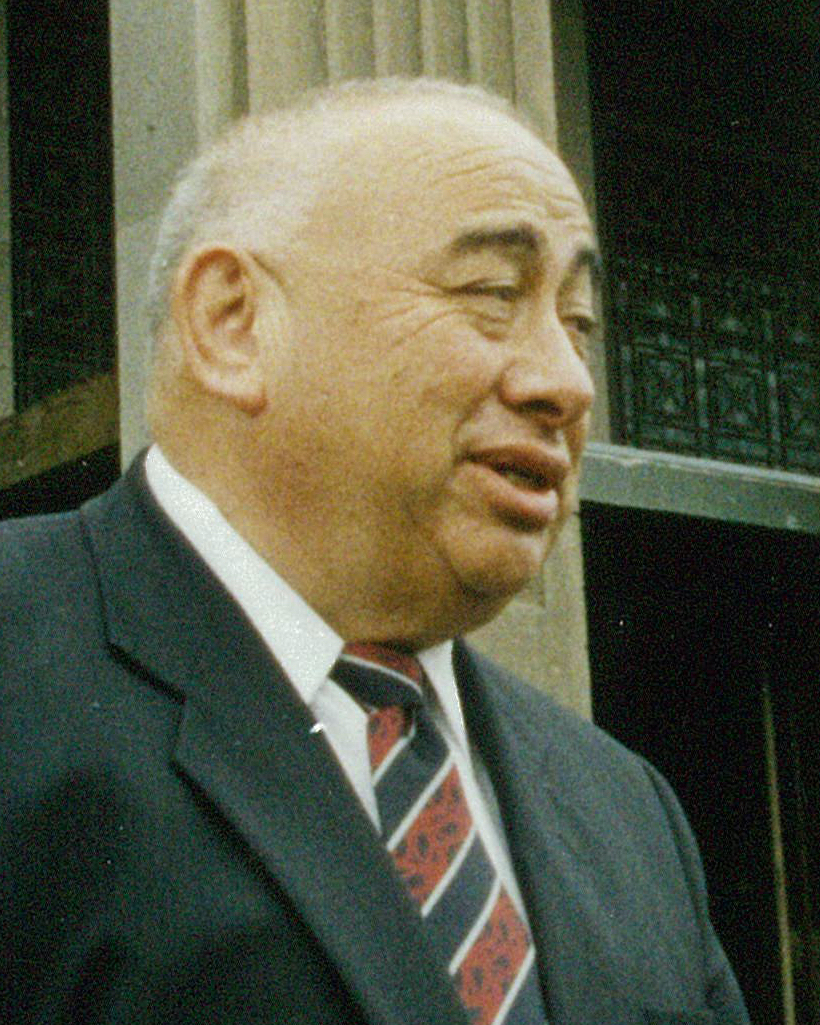
Sir Ngātata Love

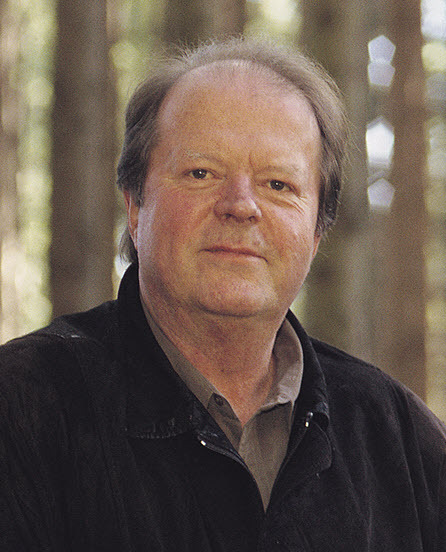
Keith Hunter

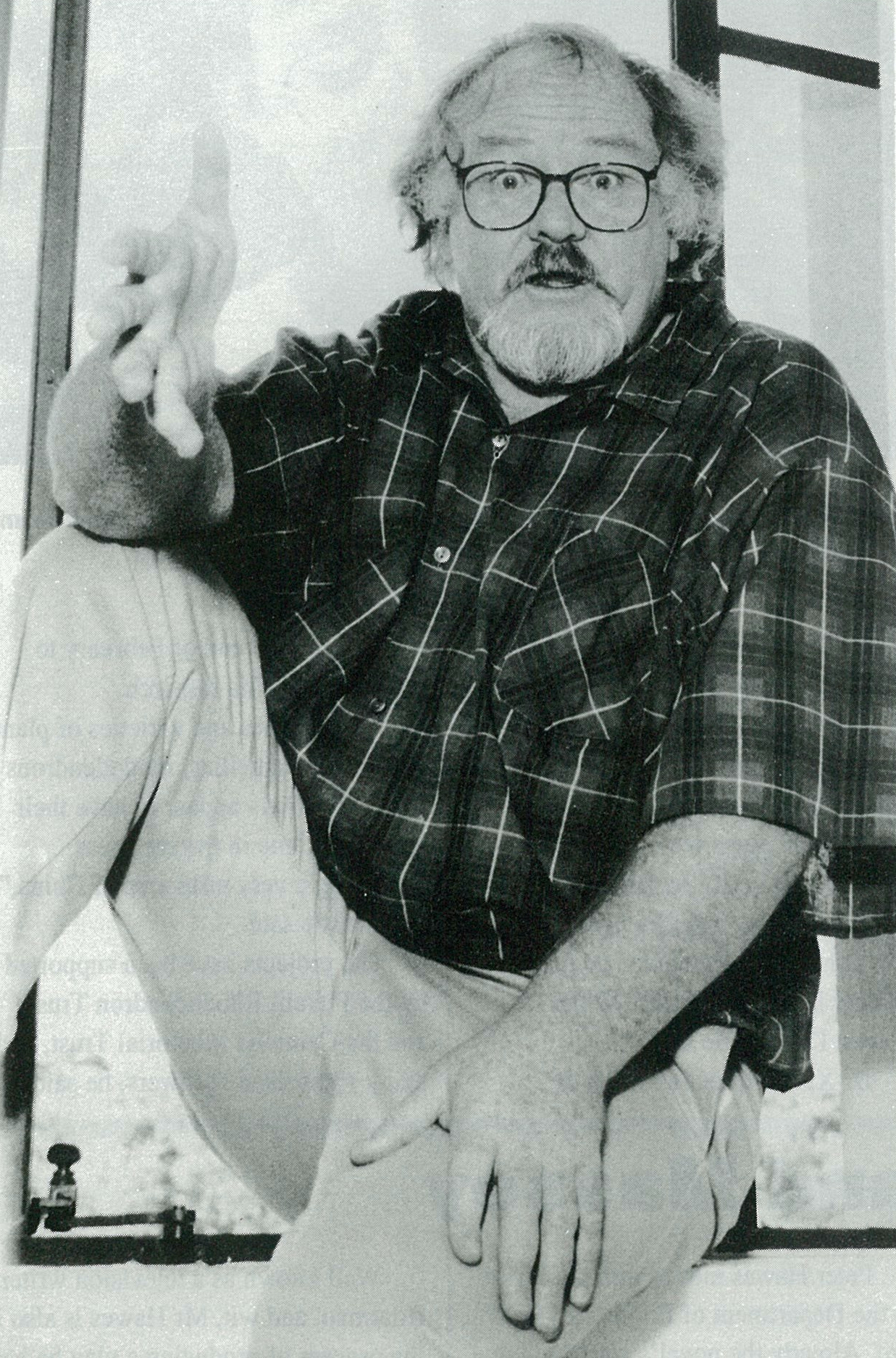
Peter Hawes

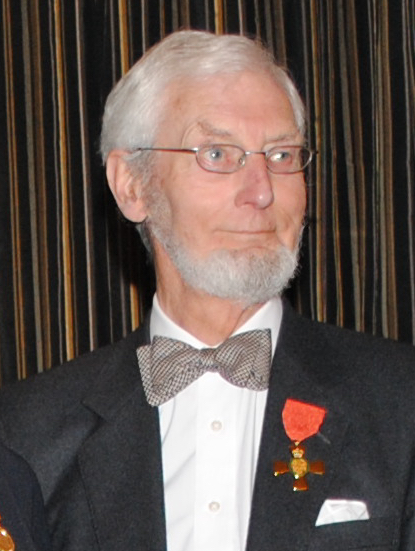
Maurice Mahoney

=== November ===
- 4 November – Tama Renata, Hall of Fame musician (Herbs), and composer (Once Were Warriors theme).
- 6 November – Gordon Whiting, lawyer and judge, Environment Court judge (1997–2012) (born 1942).
- 13 November – Sir John Anderson, Hall of Fame banker (National Bank, ANZ), health and sports administrator, chair of Capital and Coast (2007–2010) and Hawke's Bay (2008–2010) District Health Boards, chair of New Zealand Cricket (1995–2008) (born 1945).
- 14 November – Douglas Wright, dancer and choreographer (Limbs Dance Company, Paul Taylor Dance Company, Douglas Wright Dance Company), Arts Foundation laureate (2000) (born 1956).
- 18 November – Peter Peryer, photographer, Arts Foundation laureate (2000) (born 1941).
- 19 November – Neil Collins, broadcaster (4XD, 4ZB, Radio Dunedin) and local-body politician, Dunedin City Councillor (1989–2013) (born 1941).
- 20 November – Cyril Belshaw, anthropologist (University of British Columbia) (born 1921).
- 24 November – Gordon Copeland, politician, United Future (2002–2007) and independent list MP (2007–2008) (born 1943).
- 28 November – Georgie Salter, netball player (national team) and coach (Otago Rebels, Auckland Diamonds), world championship bronze medallist (1975) (born 1950).
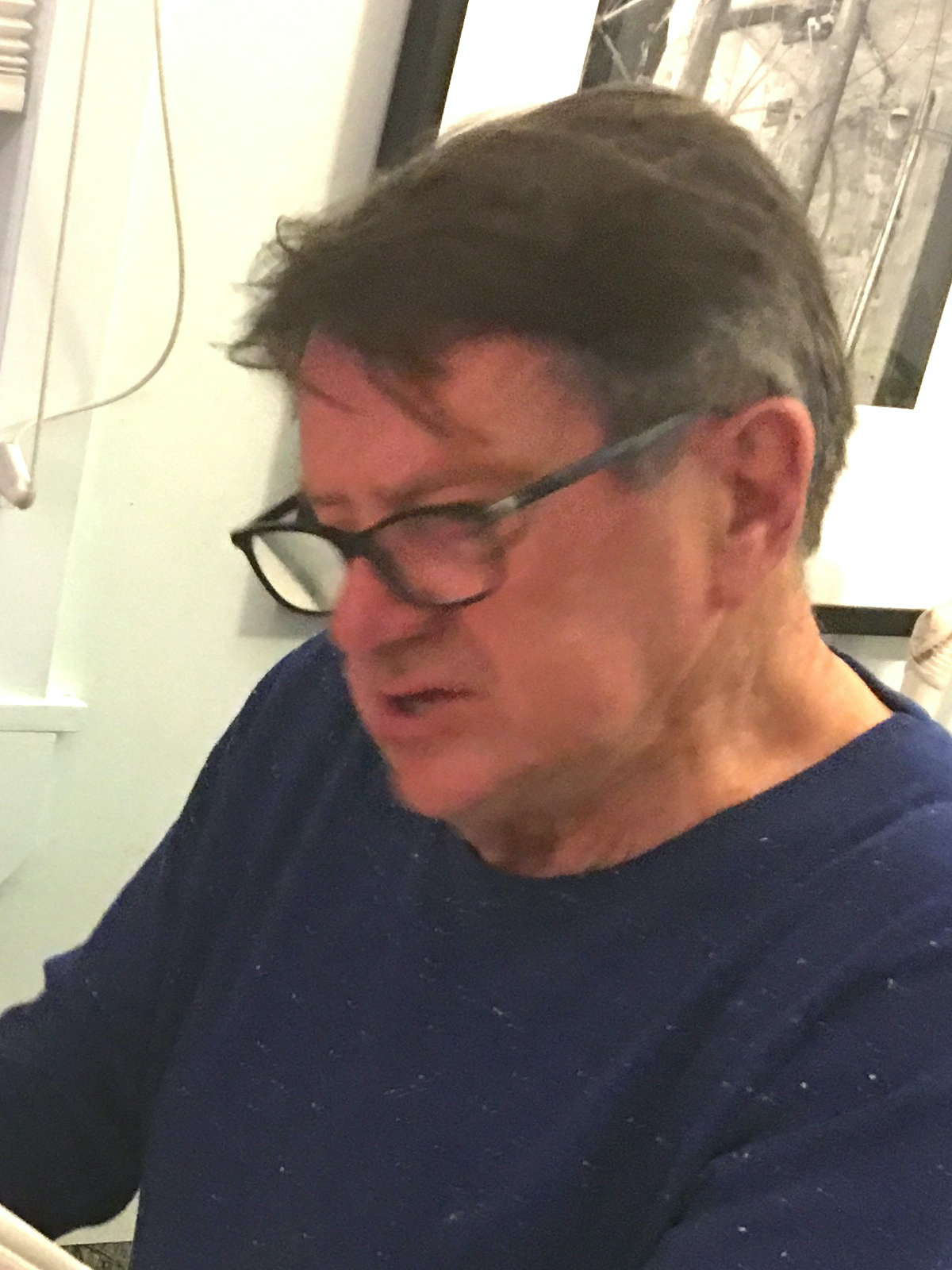
Peter Peryer

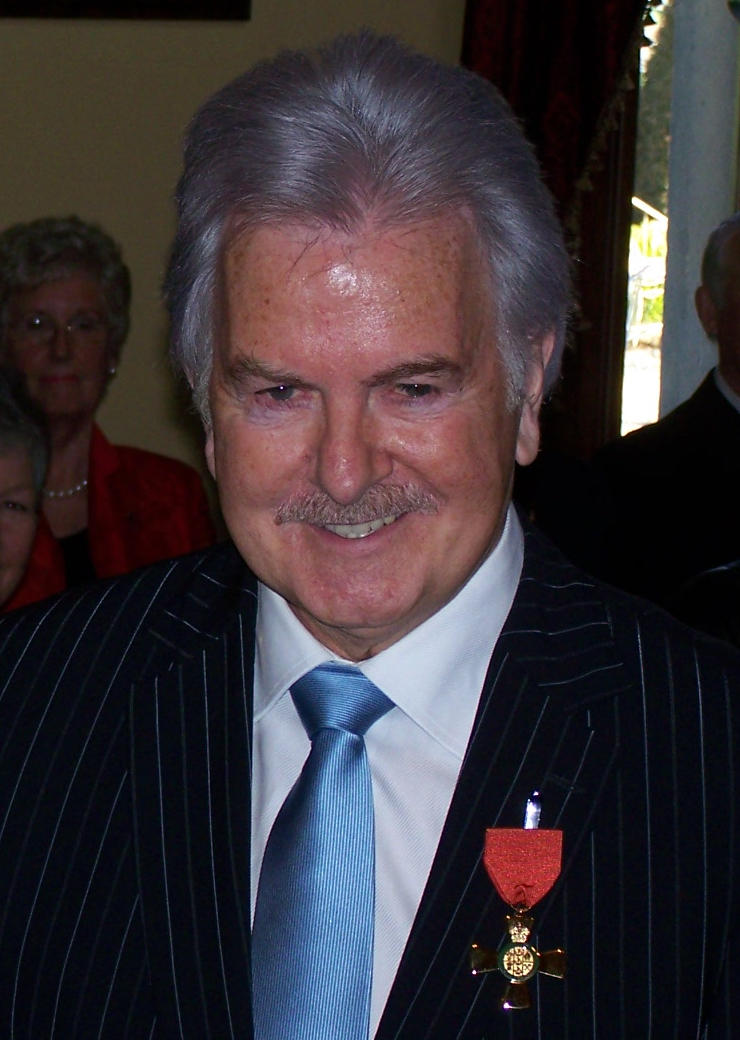
Neil Collins

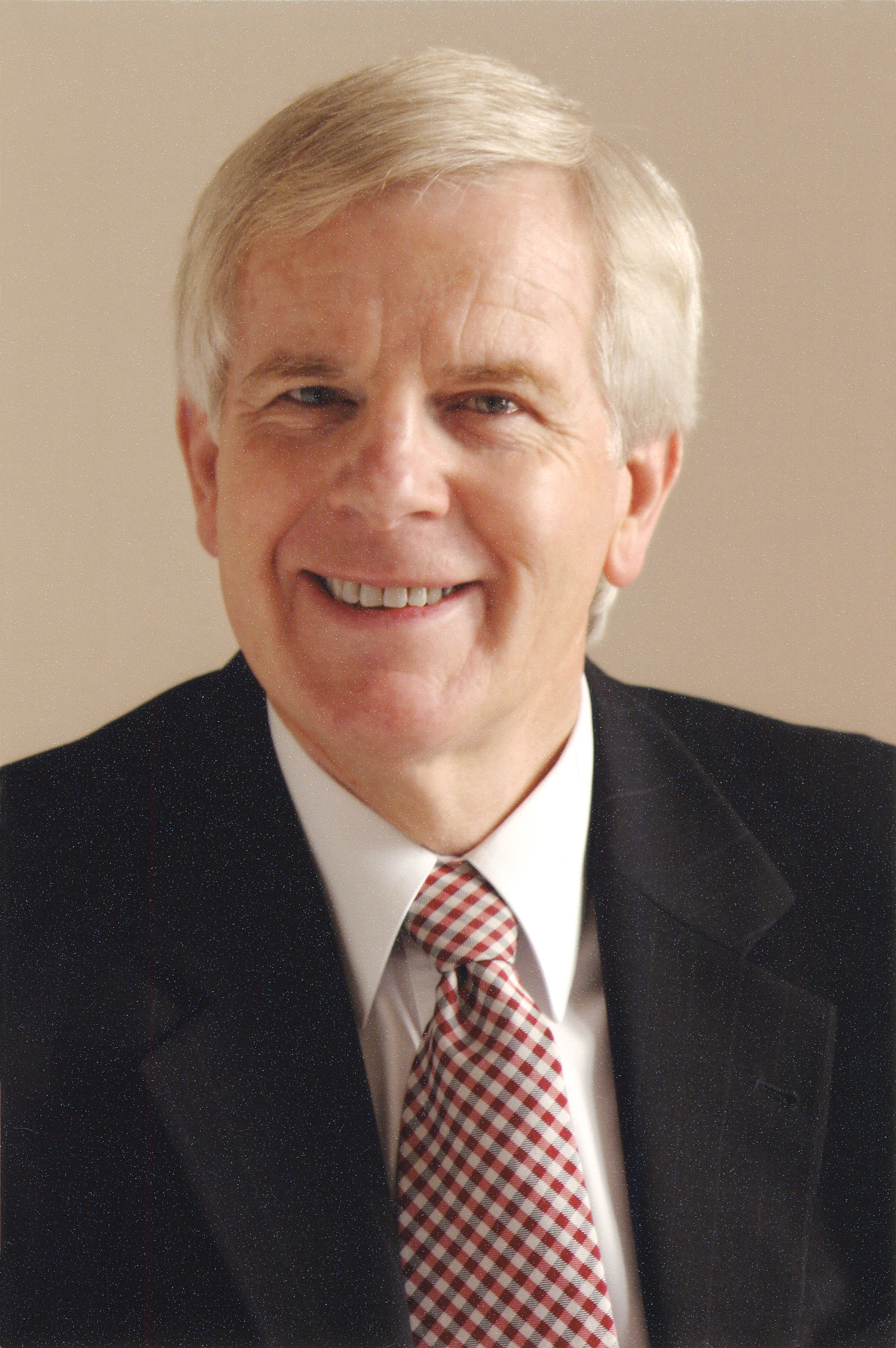
Gordon Copeland

=== December ===
- 1 December – Vivian Lynn, artist (born 1931).
- 2 December – William Smith, naval officer (Royal New Zealand Naval Volunteer Reserve, Royal New Zealand Navy) (born 1922).
- 3 December – Geoff Murphy, film director and screenwriter (Goodbye Pork Pie, Utu, Under Siege 2: Dark Territory), New Zealand Film Awards lifetime achievement award (2013), Arts Foundation of New Zealand Icon (since 2013) (born 1938).
- 5 December – John Armstrong, politician and businessman, New Plymouth City Councillor (1977–1989), MP for New Plymouth (1990–1993) (born 1935).
- 6 December – Robin Clark, inorganic chemist (University College London), Fellow of the Royal Society (since 1990), Bakerian Medal (2008) (born 1935).
- 11 December
  - Winifred Griffin, Olympic (1956) and British Empire and Commonwealth Games (1950, 1954) swimmer, British Empire Games silver medallist (1950) (born 1932).
  - Hiwi Tauroa, rugby union player (Manawatu, Taranaki, New Zealand Māori) and coach (Counties), teacher and public servant, principal of Wesley College (1968–1974) and Tuakau College (1974–1979), Race Relations Conciliator (1980–1986) (born 1927).
- 20 December
  - Randall Carrington, cricketer (Auckland) (born 1934).
  - Trevor Chinn, glaciologist (Ministry of Works, New Zealand Geological Survey, NIWA) (born 1937).
- 21 December – Fay Gock, market gardener and horticulturalist (born 1933).
- 25 December – Bill Baillie, Hall of Fame Olympic (1964) and British Empire and Commonwealth Games (1954, 1958, 1962, 1966) athlete, Lonsdale Cup (1963) (born 1934).
- 30 December – Harry Atkinson, physicist (Atomic Energy Research Establishment, Rutherford Laboratory) and science administrator, chair of the European Space Agency Council (1984–1987) (born 1929).
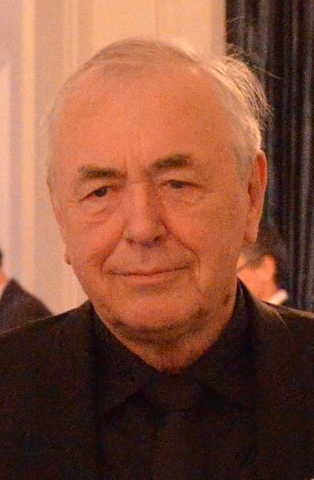
Geoff Murphy

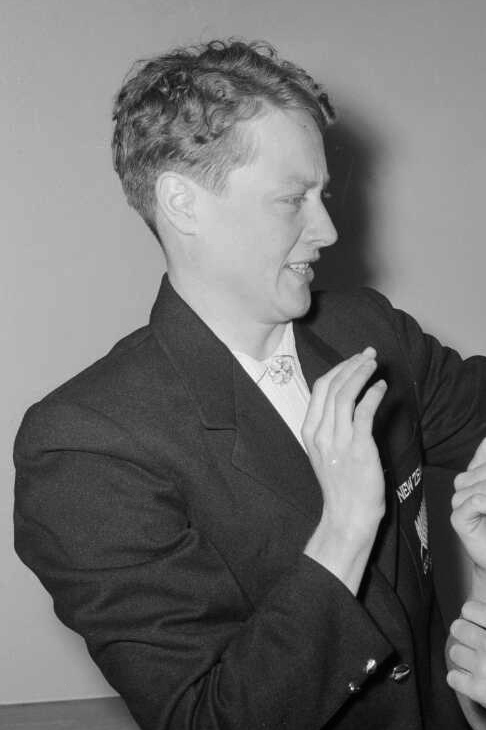
Winifred Griffin

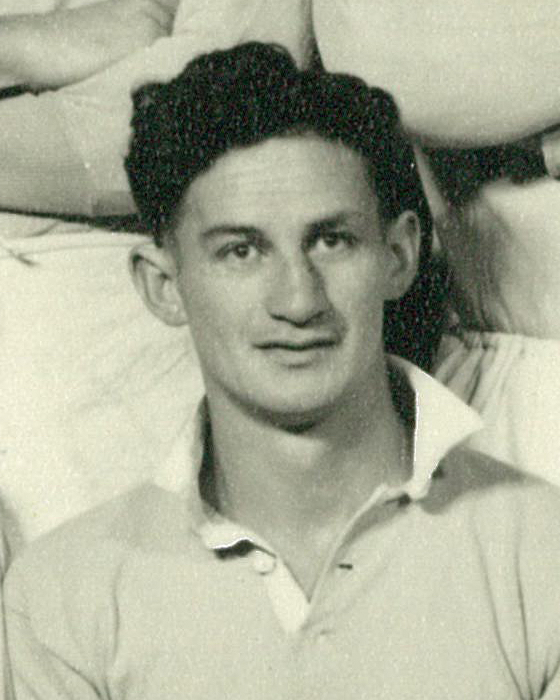
Hiwi Tauroa

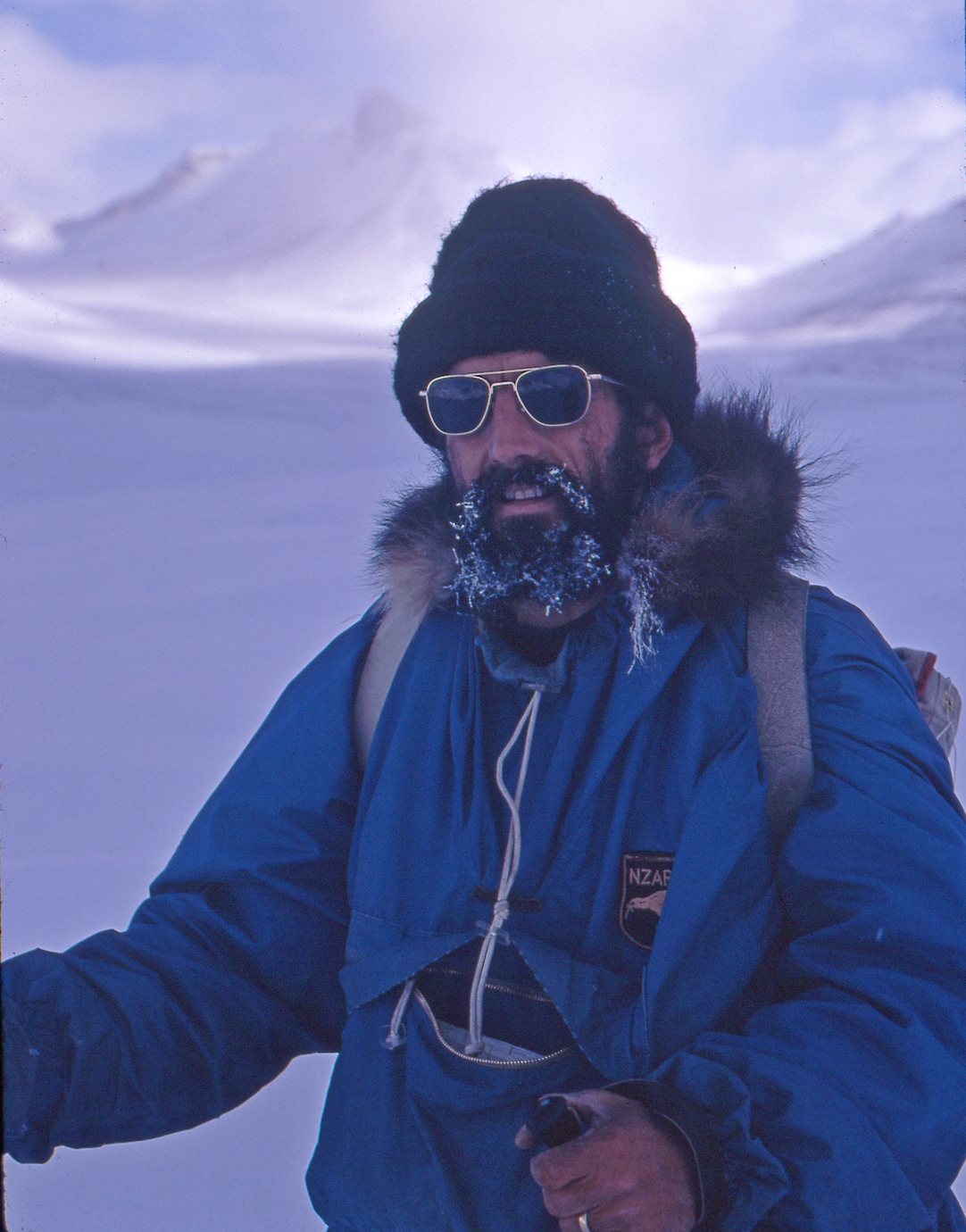
Trevor Chinn

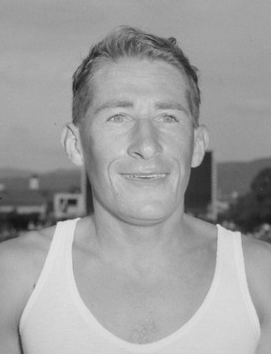
Bill Baillie
