= David Fergusson (psychologist) =

New Zealand psychologist

- Born: David Murray Fergusson; May 1944; London, England
- Died: 3 October 2018 (aged 74); Nelson, New Zealand
- Known for: Christchurch Health and Development Study
- Scientific career
- Fields: Psychology
- Workplaces: University of Otago, Christchurch
- Thesis: A longitudinal study of dentine lead, cognitive ability and behaviour in a birth cohort of New Zealand children (1988)

David Murray Fergusson (May 1944 – 3 October 2018) was a New Zealand psychologist. He was a professor of psychological medicine at the University of Otago, Christchurch, from 1999 until 2015. He is notable for work on the Christchurch Health and Development Study and for his research on abortion and mental health.

== Early life ==
Born in London, England, in May 1944, Fergusson joined the Merchant Navy when he was 15 years old. However, he subsequently emigrated to New Zealand, and began working for an electronics firm in Wellington in 1965. He studied psychology, sociology and education at Victoria University of Wellington, graduating Bachelor of Arts with honours, before working as a government policy advisor for seven years. He moved to Christchurch in 1976.

== Research career ==
=== Christchurch Health and Development Study ===
Fergusson was the founding director of the Christchurch Health and Development Study, a study of a birth cohort of 1265 children born in the Christchurch region in 1977. The cohort has been studied through infancy, adolescence, and as adults. The university states that as of 2018, over 480 publications had been produced, using data gathered from the cohort.

One study using data from the study found that cannabis use was associated with a number of adverse outcomes, including cannabis dependence and the use of other illicit drugs.

=== Abortion studies ===
Fergusson published a number of studies regarding abortion and mental health.

A self-described pro-choice atheist and rationalist, Fergusson undertook his first investigation with the expectation that his cohort data would prove that the apparent link between abortion and mental health problems would be explained by pre-existing factors. Instead, his data revealed that abortion was an independent "risk factor for the onset of mental illness".

The study found abortion was linked to higher rates of depression, anxiety, drug and alcohol abuse, and suicidal behaviours. At age 25, 42% of the women in the cohort had experienced major depression during the previous four years, twice that of other women.

While retaining a pro-choice position, Fergusson's research convinced him that: "Abortion is a traumatic life event; that is, it involves loss, it involves grief, it involves difficulties. And the trauma may, in fact, predispose people to having mental illness."

Fergusson also reported experiencing difficulties getting his study published since the results contradicted the prevailing view that abortion does not have mental health consequences. Saying that his studies were normally accepted the first time, Fergusson reported that the first of his studies on abortion was rejected by four journals because of the controversial nature of his findings. He was also asked to not publish the results by New Zealand's Abortion Supervisory Committee, the government agency responsible for regulating compliance with the country's abortion laws. He refused to comply with the request because he felt it would be "scientifically irresponsible" to hide the findings.

Following further reviews of other abortion related research, Fergusson concluded that abortion does not have therapeutic effects for mental health, and poses a small to moderate increase in risk of some mental health problems.

=== Other work ===
Fergusson is also known for his research pertaining to domestic violence.

== Later life and death ==
Following his retirement from the University of Otago in 2015, Fergusson did consulting work for the Ministry of Social Development. He died in Nelson from lung cancer on 3 October 2018.

== Honours and awards ==
Fergusson was elected a Fellow of the Royal Society of New Zealand in 2006. The same year, he was awarded the Christchurch School of Medicine and Health Sciences gold medal for research excellence. In 2010, he received the University of Otago Distinguished Research Medal, that institution's highest research honour. On his retirement from Otago in 2015, Fergusson was conferred the title of emeritus professor.

Fergusson was an Honorary Fellow of the New Zealand Psychological Society and the Royal Australasian College of Physicians.
