= Murray Matthewson =

New Zealand orthopaedic surgeon (1944–2018)

- Born: Murray Hugh Matthewson; 17 September 1944; Wellington, New Zealand
- Died: 3 August 2018 (aged 73); Cambridge
- Citizenship: British and New Zealand
- Education: University of Otago University of Texas University of Cambridge
- Medical career
- Field: Orthopaedic surgery
- Institutions: University of Texas; Addenbrooke's Hospital
- Sub-specialties: Hand surgery
- Awards: Gordon Gordon-Taylor

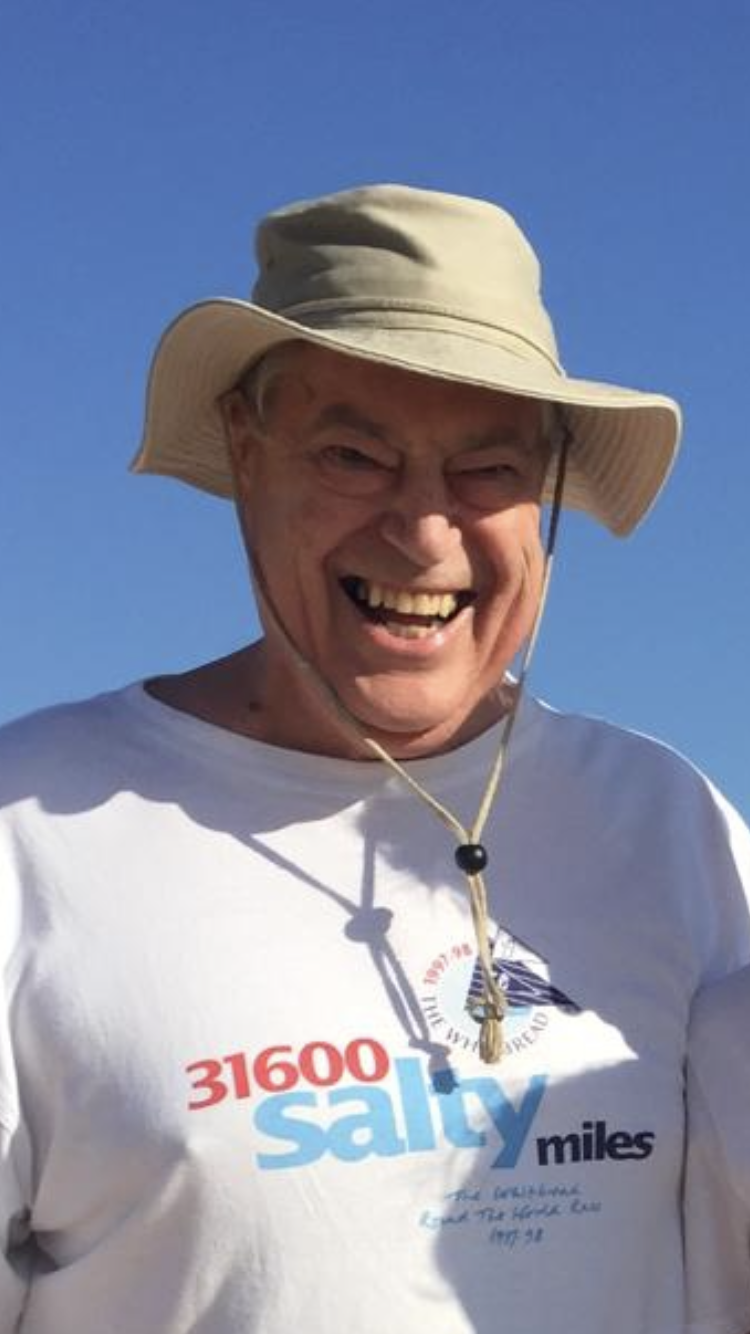
Murray Matthewson in his later years, at Quinta do Lago Beach, Portugal.

Murray Hugh Matthewson (17 September 1944 – 3 August 2018) was a British-New Zealand orthopaedic surgeon who specialised in the spine and hand. Recipient of The Gordon Taylor Prize, he was an examiner for The Royal College of Surgeons as well as a Life Fellow of Hughes Hall, University of Cambridge, Associate Lecturer in the Faculty of Clinical Medicine, University of Cambridge and president of the British Society for Surgery of the Hand 2003. He was Orthopaedic Surgeon to Cambridge University Rugby Club 1998–2005.
