= Barrie Frost =

New Zealand-born Canadian neuroscientist and psychologist (died 2018)

Barrie James Frost FRSC (1938/39 – 4 October 2018) was a New Zealand-born Canadian psychologist and neuroscientist.

Born in Nelson, New Zealand, Frost was educated at Nelson College from 1953 to 1956. He initially trained as a primary school teacher, and then earned his bachelor's and master's degrees from the University of Canterbury, followed by a PhD from Dalhousie University in 1967. Frost then taught at Queen's University at Kingston. Over the course of his career, Frost was granted fellowship into the Royal Society of Canada, the Canadian Psychological Association, the American Association for the Advancement of Science, and the Royal Physiographic Society in Lund, and received a Humboldt Research Award. Frost died of cancer at the Providence Care Hospital in Kingston, Ontario on 4 October 2018, aged 79.

== Selected works ==
- Annis, Robert C., and Barrie Frost. "Human visual ecology and orientation anisotropies in acuity." Science 182, no. 4113 (1973): 729–731.
- Nelson, J. I., and B. J. Frost. "Orientation-selective inhibition from beyond the classic visual receptive field." Brain Research 139, no. 2 (1978): 359–365.
- Wang, Yongchang, and Barrie J. Frost. "Time to collision is signalled by neurons in the nucleus rotundus of pigeons." Nature 356, no. 6366 (1992): 236.
