= Hayden Poulter =

New Zealand serial killer (1961–2018)

- Born: Hayden Tyrone Poulter; August 1961; Auckland, New Zealand
- Died: 22 September 2018 (aged 57); Whanganui Prison, Whanganui, New Zealand
- Other name: John Leon Lorenzo
- Conviction: Murder x3
- Penalty: Life in prison (4 September 1997)

Details
- Victims: 3+
- Span of crimes: 19 – 26 October 1996
- Country: New Zealand
- Date apprehended: 26 October 1996
- Imprisoned at: Whanganui Prison

Hayden Tyrone Poulter (August 1961 – 22 September 2018) was a New Zealand serial killer who murdered three people in Auckland in October 1996. Convicted of all three murders but boasted of committing more, he was sentenced to life imprisonment. Following a brief stint out of prison on parole before it was revoked, Poulter killed himself in September 2018 at Whanganui Prison. He has been labelled in the media as New Zealand's first serial killer.

== Early life ==
Poulter was born in August 1961, in New Zealand, to a British couple who had migrated to the country. His father was a violent person who left his family and the country, leaving Poulter to be raised by his mother and stepfather. During his teenage years, Poulter spent time in different foster homes where he claimed he was abused. In 1978, Poulter joined the Navy but was later discharged. He went on to work in various jobs including advertising, farming, fishing, shearing, and demolition. Between each job Poulter racked up a string of convictions, reaching sixty-seven in total, however, none of them were for violence.

Poulter suffered from epilepsy and depression, and attempted suicide at least three times. He had a brief relationship with a woman and fathered a son, but by the early 1990s, both Poulter's partner and son had left him. He entered Odyssey House, a drug and alcohol support service based in Christchurch, seeking treatment for his addictions. He was hooked on cannabis and LSD at the time, and was close to graduating, however, he relapsed. He then got into a relationship with a sex worker who he met at Odyssey House. She was later jailed after committing an aggravated robbery of a dairy, during which she was shot by police. According to Poulter, this was what triggered him and pushed him over the edge.

== Murders ==
On 19 October 1996, Poulter met 21-year-old Natacha Hogan, a sex worker, on a street in Auckland just before 5:00 a.m. after he had trawled through two bars looking for potential victims. They walked towards Pigeon Park, next to the Symonds Street Cemetery, where Poulter had asked to have sex. Poulter then robbed, raped, and murdered Hogan by bludgeoning her to death. Her body was later found by a nun walking her dog. When police examined the crime scene, they discovered Hogan had been bashed with two rocks. Six days later, Poulter sent a long letter full of misspellings to the New Zealand Herald's Auckland newsroom. The letter made reference to Hogan's murder, which Poulter claimed was his fourth killing. He also claimed he would kill again and bragged about his crimes.

On 26 October 1996, Poulter entered Cleopatra's, a massage parlour in Auckland's CBD, armed with a large knife. Poulter entered the parlour around 4.20 p.m. and paid $50 for a room with his pick of a Thai woman. He chose Ladda Nimphet and entered a private room with her. When she left to make some coffee, Poulter retrieved his knife and then stabbed Nimphet to death when she returned. The manager of the parlour, Herbert Richard Norris, and another Thai woman who worked there, Angkana Chaisamret, heard screams. As the door swung open a naked Poulter emerged holding a bloodied knife. Poulter then stabbed both Norris and Chaisamret before fleeing the parlour through a second-storey window at the back of the building. All three victims suffered multiple stab wounds. Both Norris and Nimphet succumbed to their injuries but Chaisamret survived. Hours later, Poulter, who was bleeding from his leg, walked into the Auckland central police station at around 11:13 p.m. and placed the knife on the counter. He surrendered to the police and confessed to the murders.

== Trial ==
Poulter confessed to his crimes, but while describing the events he claimed he could not remember the week between the killings. He attributed his murderous rampage to a second personality of his which he called 'Hell' which had supposedly driven him to commit murder. He claimed he thought the massage parlour workers were gang members who were out to ruin him. He said he had remorse for the slayings.

In 1997, after he was declared sane, Poulter pleaded guilty to murder, rape, attempted murder, and possession of an offensive weapon in public. Days after pleading guilty, he was jailed for life, with a fifteen-year non-parole period.

== Parole ==
Poulter first became eligible for parole in late 2011, but it was denied. He was again denied parole in 2015 and 2016. In June 2018, after twenty-one years behinds bars, Poulter was paroled for the first time, with the board believing he was no longer a risk. In July, Poulter changed his name to John Leon Lorenzo and moved in with his sister, where he started a landscaping business. He had a long list of parole conditions and his work and address had to be approved. He was also required to undertake drug and alcohol treatment. He was electronically monitored and not allowed to drink alcohol.

Between June and August 2018, there were reportedly no issues, however, by late August 2018, it was reported that Poulter had started taking drugs and was supposedly planning to fake his own death so he could be free of his parole conditions. His probation officer, who was already concerned with some of his behaviour, informed the New Zealand Parole Board, who granted a recall application. On 27 August 2018, Poulter was taken back into custody.

On the day of the recall, Poulter was given a risk assessment in which he denied that he was going to self-harm. He did admit, however, that he wished to speak to a counsellor. On 2 September, an officer attempted to make a referral to a private counselling provider. On 4 September, Poulter was seen by a nurse and he denied any thoughts of self-harm and suicide. The nurse decided the forensic service did not therefore need to be involved.

== Death ==
On 22 September 2018, Poulter was found dead in his cell at Whanganui Prison, with his death being ruled a suicide. The exact details of the method of death are suppressed. He was 57.

== See also ==
- List of serial killers by country
