= Barry Linton =

New Zealand cartoonist (1947–2018)

Barry Desmond Linton (1947 – 2 October 2018) was a New Zealand cartoonist known for his contribution to the periodical Strips (1977–1987) and his strong technical skill and "craftsmanship". His work has been published in books, magazines and literary journals, as posters, and on album covers. He died in Auckland on 2 October 2018, at the age of 71.

== Early life ==
Linton was born in Auckland and educated in Christchurch and Hamilton. In 'The Mighty Waikato', Linton describes growing up in Hamilton in the 1960s as like "a season ticket to Wally World". He worked in a shoe shop and designed store window displays for a Hamilton department store before attending Elam School of Fine Arts for one year in 1967.

== Career ==
Linton's first published strips were for the Auckland University newspaper Craccum. He was a founding contributor to Strips in 1977, producing over 100 pages for Strips between 1977 and 1987. Linton's work has been published in Landfall, Razor, the New Zealand Listener, the Ponsonby Rag, and the Auckland Star. He also created posters for Red Mole Theatre.

Linton's work was exhibited at the Centre of Contemporary Art in Christchurch.

== Publications ==
- Sput takes root (1977), self published
- Strips (1977–1987). (contributor)
- Chok Chok! (1994), self published
- Bacon is not a vegetable: (701 tips for flatting) (1999), David Link, Auckland. (illustrator)
- Sweet: a guide for New Zealand teenagers (2001), David Ling, Auckland. (illustrator)
- 20th century BC (2008), Centre of Contemporary Art, Christchurch
- Lucky Aki (2009), Pikitia Press, St Kilda West
- Aki in Tiko (2009), Pikitia Press, St Kilda West
- Lucky Aki in the new stone age (2014), Pikitia Press, St Kilda West
