= Christchurch Health and Development Study =

Observational study of human health

The Christchurch Health and Development Study is an ongoing long-term observational study of human health, based on study of a group of individuals born in Christchurch, New Zealand, in the 1970s. It has spawned over 500 papers and many other experiments.

== Overview ==
From April to August 1977, health researchers from the University of Otago, Christchurch, sought to enroll newborns as study participants. Ultimately, 1,265 children in Christchurch, representing over 97% of the births during the intake period, were enrolled in the study and followed into their 40s. A wide variety of data was collected regarding family, personal and social circumstances over the time period. Initial data were conducted at birth, four months, one year, every year to the age of 16, again at the age of 18 and at 21.

By 2001, the study had produced results regarding unemployment, crime, substance abuse, breastfeeding, adolescent pregnancy, adoption, and other topics. For example, the study found a strong correlation between duration of breastfeeding and academic outcomes in high school, building on previous research showing a change in IQ alone.

The study also collected over 900 baby teeth to evaluate the impact of lead on behavioral and cognitive outcomes.

A 40-year followup was conducted in 2019.

== Recent findings ==
- A 2009 study supported single-sex education.
- A 2018 analysis found that teen drinkers were far more likely to suffer from alcoholism as adults.
- A research result found that "smacking" children was ineffective as punishment.
- A 2018 result showed that children in the study period had a four-fold higher risk of obesity than their parents, suggesting that generational changes in diet and exercise have impacted obesity.
- A 2020 analysis found that over 28% of New Zealanders had tried meth at some point in their life.
- A 2020 paper evaluated the impact of marijuana use, as well as the age of first use, on mental health, depression, and psychiatric illness.
- A 2021 paper reported, based on data from the Christchurch Study, that "positive parenting" led to reduced alcoholism in adulthood.
- A 2021 research project was begun to study "quake brain": a theory of cognitive and mental decline following the 2011 Canterbury earthquakes.

== See also ==
- Grant Study - a similar Harvard study
