= Sean Hughes (surgeon) =

British surgeon (1941–2025)

Professor Sean Hughes FRCSE FRCS FRCSI
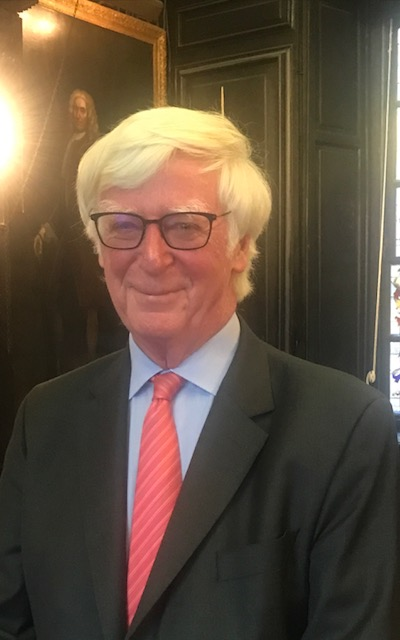
- Hughes in 2018
- Born: Sean Patrick Francis Hughes; 2 December 1941; Farnham, England
- Died: 4 May 2025 (aged 83)
- Education: Downside School; University of London
- Known for: Orthopedics; History of Medicine
- Medical career
- Profession: Orthopedic Surgery
- Institutions: Imperial College London; Hammersmith Hospital; University of Edinburgh
- Research: Blood flow in bone; stem cells in orthopaedic practice; bone infection; Role of nitric oxide in bone and joint disease
- Awards: Arris and Gale Lecture

Sean Patrick Francis Hughes (2 December 1941 – 4 May 2025) was British emeritus professor of orthopaedic surgery at Imperial College London where he was previously professor of orthopaedic surgery and head of the department of surgery, anaesthetics and intensive care. Earlier in his career he had been professor of orthopaedic surgery at the University of Edinburgh.

His clinical research topics included fracture healing, musculoskeletal infection and the surgery of degenerate lumbar and cervical discs. His basic science research publications included studies of the microcirculation of bone, bone infection and the role of nitric oxide in bone and joint disease. He served as vice president of the Royal College of Surgeons of Edinburgh, and chairman of DISCS, the charity funding research into spinal conditions.

His interests in the history of medicine were focused on the history of orthopaedic surgery, and the doctor and poet John Keats.

== Early life and training ==
Sean Hughes was born in Farnham, Surrey, England on 2 December 1941, the son of Patrick J. and Kathleen E. Hughes. He completed his early education at Downside School. He studied medicine at the University of London, qualifying MB BS in 1966. His surgical training in orthopaedics took place in London and he became a senior registrar in orthopaedic and trauma surgery at the Middlesex Hospital and the Royal National Orthopaedic Hospital. He attained his FRCSEd in 1971 and FRCSEng and FRCSI the following year. Subsequently, he was awarded the degree of MS from University of London with a thesis on bone blood flow, completed while he was research fellow at the Mayo Clinic, Rochester, Minnesota, US.

== Surgical career ==
In 1979, Hughes was appointed Senior Lecturer and honorary consultant orthopaedic surgeon, Royal Postgraduate Medical School in London. Later that year he was appointed to the Chair of Orthopaedic Surgery at the University of Edinburgh. In 1984/85, he held an academic mentorship for Rüdiger Döhler. The International Skeletal Society's 25th anniversary book lists him as a member.

In 1991, Hughes became professor of orthopaedic surgery, Imperial College London and honorary consultant orthopaedic surgeon, Hammersmith Hospitals NHS Trust (1991–2006). At the same time he took on the role of Chief of Service Orthopaedics and Trauma Surgery, Hammersmith Hospitals NHS Trust, a post which he held until 1997, when he became the Trust's Clinical Director for Surgery and Anaesthetics. He was Non-Executive Director of the West Middlesex University Hospital (2001–2005) and was Medical Director of Ravenscourt Park Hospital from 2002–2004. Hughes was Clinical Director of the Hillingdon Primary Care Trust from 2008–10.

In addition to his clinical and academic responsibilities, Hughes was Vice President of the Royal College of Surgeons of Edinburgh (1994–97) and President of the British Orthopaedic Research Society (1995–97). He served as chairman of the charity Action Research, now called Action Medical Research (1998–1991).

Hughes was on the International Advisory Board of the Journal of Orthopaedics, Trauma and was Chairman of the charity Discovering Innovative Solutions for Conditions of the Spine (DISCS). He was also a primary editor of The Bone & Joint Journal.

Hughes performed basic research on bone blood flow mineral exchange, musculoskeletal infections and stem cell research. He had a special interest in degenerative disc disease and external fixation of fractures (Hughes-Suhktian fixator).

== History of Medicine ==
Hughes gave lectures on the history of orthopaedics and, in 2017, delivered the Keats Memorial Lecture at the Worshipful Society of Apothecaries, entitled "How Did John Keats’s Medical Training Influence His Poetry?" In his 2021 paper on Keats, co-authored with Noell Snell, he argued that historians had been unduly critical in their assessment of James Clarke's treatment of Keats.

From 2021 to 2022, Hughes served as president of the History of Medicine Society at the Royal Society of Medicine (RSM), London. There, he established the Sarah Hughes Trust Lecture, which is delivered annually at the RSM. The annual event includes a prize for work on exposing fake news, awarded jointly by the RSM and the Medical Journalists' Association. He was also editor-in-chief of the Journal of Medical Biography. In 2024, he was named president-elect of the Osler Club of London, succeeding Daniel Sokol.

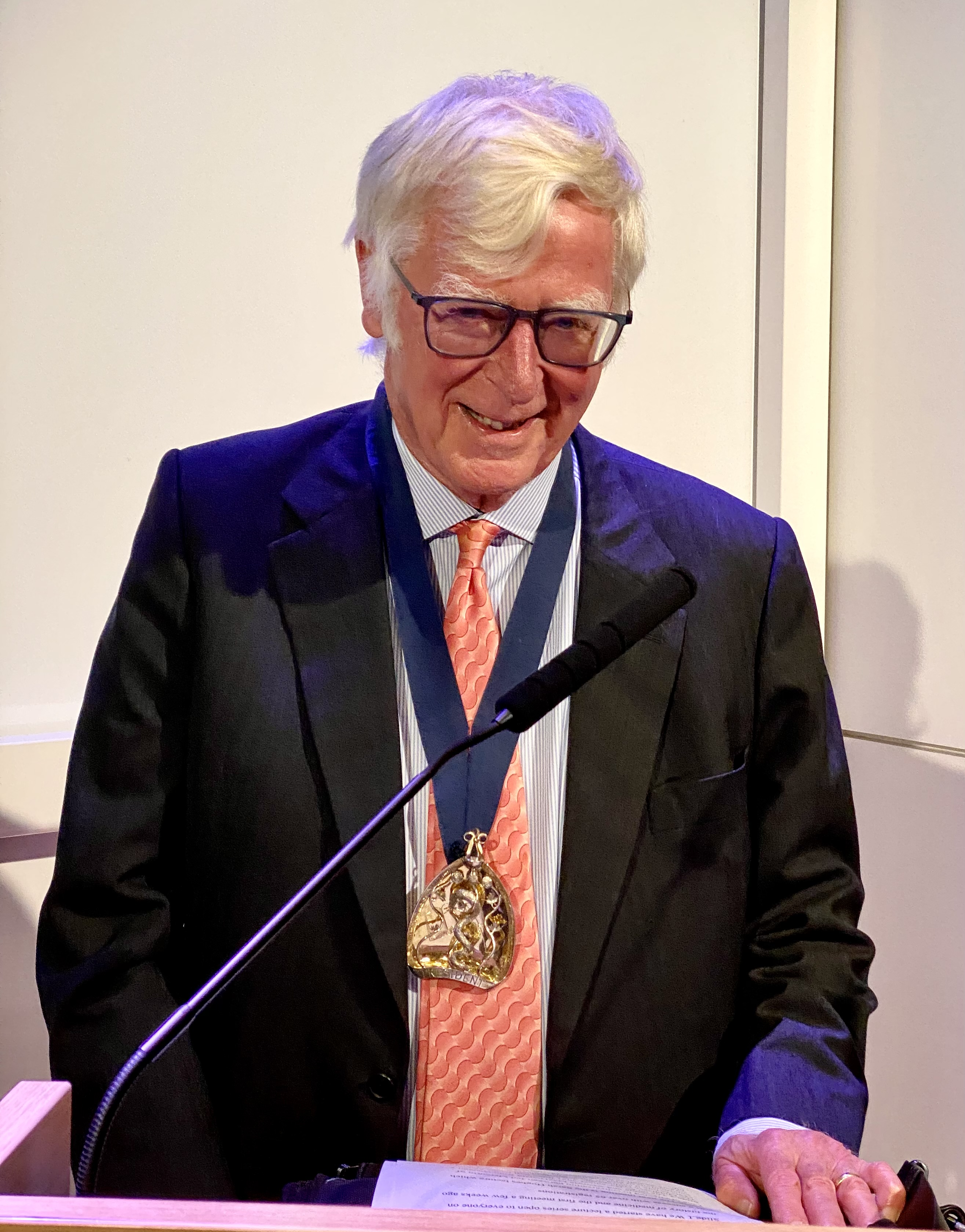
Hughes, History of Medicine Society president at the RSM (2021)

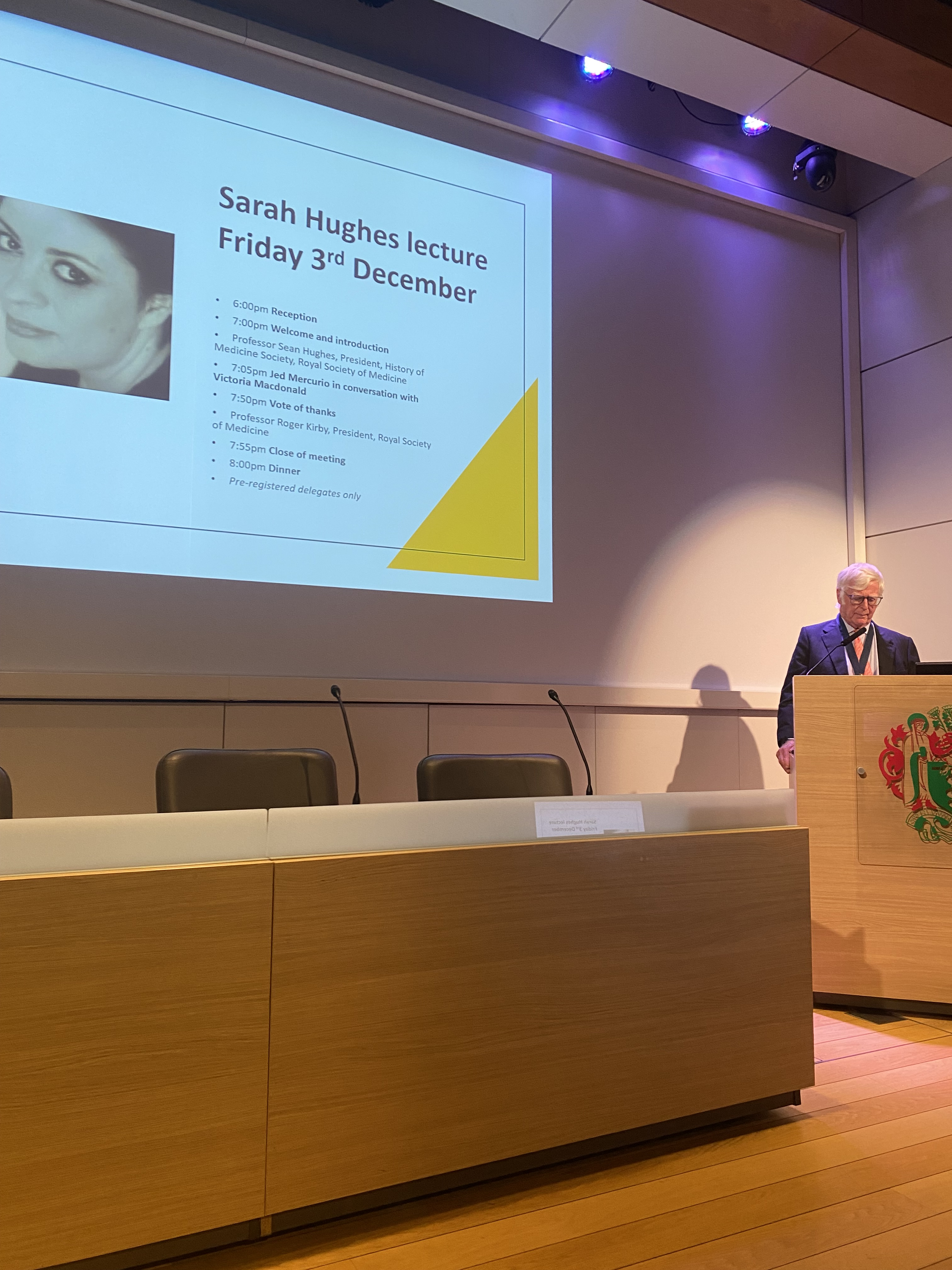
Hughes presenting the Sarah Hughes Trust Lectureship, RSM, London (2021)

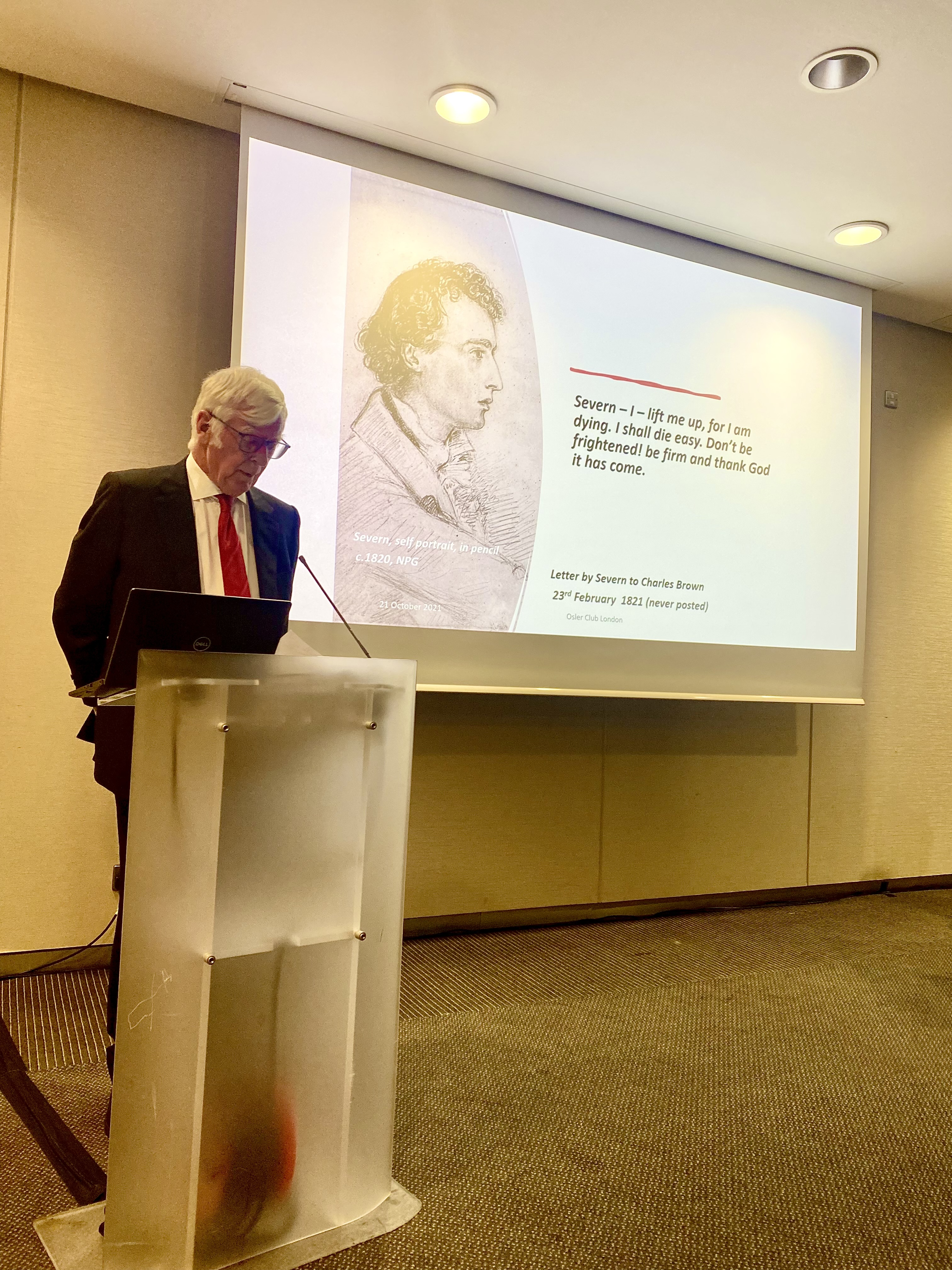
Hughes delivering lecture on Keats, Royal College of Physicians, London (2023)

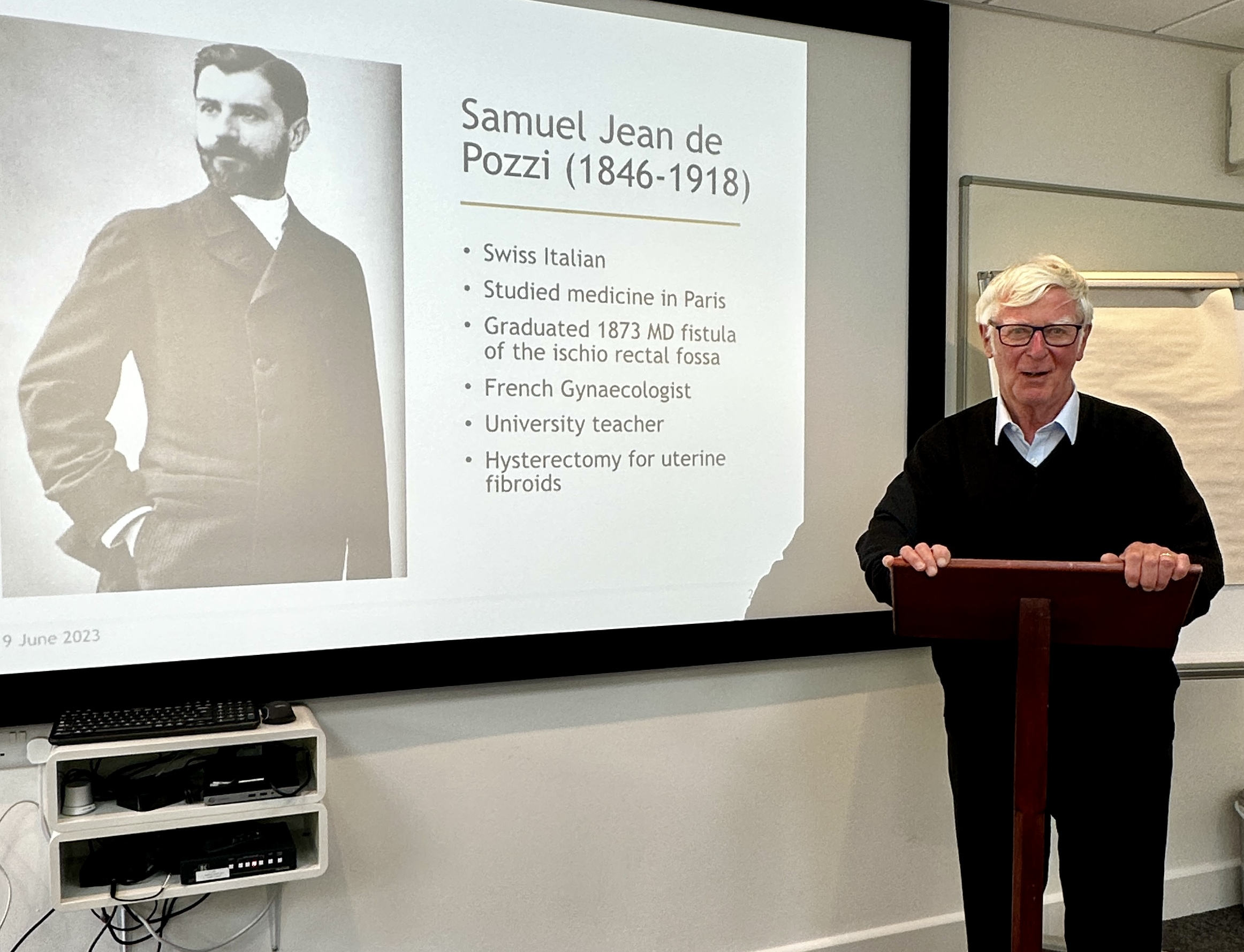
Hughes in Devon (2023)

== Personal life and death ==
Hughes married Felicity Mary Anderson and they had two daughters and one son. Their elder daughter was the journalist Sarah Hughes.

Hughes died from lung cancer on 4 May 2025, at the age of 83.

== Awards and honours ==
- Arris and Gale Lecturer, Royal College of Surgeons, 1976.
- Seddon Prize, Royal National Orthopaedic Hospital, 1976.
- U.K. Travelling Fellow, British Orthopaedic Association, 1977
- A.B.C. Travelling Fellow, British Orthopaedic Association, 1978
- Scandinavian Travelling Fellow, British and Scandinavian Orthopaedic Association, 1986
- Visiting Clinical Scientist, Mayo Clinic, Rochester, USA, 1989
- Rahima Dawood Travelling Professor, East African Associations of Surgeons, 1992
- Patrick Kelly Visiting Professor, Mayo Clinic, USA, 2000
- Walter Mercer Lecturer, British Orthopaedic Association, 2004
- President's Medal from the British Orthopaedic Research Society, September 2017.

== Selected publications ==
Hughes wrote or contributed to over 200 publications in scientific journals, thirty-two chapters in books and thirteen books, including at least one with Rodney Sweetnam.

=== Papers ===
==== General orthopaedics ====
- Hughes, SP; Davies, DR; Bassingthwaighte, JB; Knox, FG; Kelly, PJ (1977). "Bone extraction and blood clearance of diphosphonate in the dog". Am J Physiol. 232 (3): H341-7. doi:10.1152/ajpheart.1977.232.3.H341. PMC 4169266. PMID 402827.
- "Fluid space in bone". Clinical Orthopaedics and Related Research. Vol. 134, 1 July 1978, pp. 32–341. Co-authored with D.R. Davies, P.J. Kelly and R. Khan,
- Court-Brown, C; Hughes, SP (1982). "Experience with the Sukhtian--Hughes external fixation system". J R Soc Med. 75 (12): 949–57. doi:10.1177/014107688207501206. PMC 1438470. PMID 6757433.
- "Orthopaedics. The principles and practice of musculoskeletal surgery". British Journal of Surgery. Vol. 75, 1988, pp. 623–623. Co-authored with M. K. D’A. Benson and C. L. Colton.

==== Bone blood flow and fracture healing ====
- Hughes, SP; Lemon, GJ; Davies, DR; Bassingthwaighte, JB; Kelly, PJ (1979). "Extraction of minerals after experimental fractures of the tibia in dogs". J Bone Joint Surg Am. 61 (6): 857–66. doi:10.2106/00004623-197961060-00009. PMC 3625437. PMID 383718.
- McCarthy, ID; Hughes, SP (1989). "Multiple tracer studies of bone uptake of 99mTc-MDP and 85Sr". Am J Physiol. 256 (5): H1261-5. doi:10.1152/ajpheart.1989.256.5.H1261. PMID 2719126.
- Corbett, SA; McCarthy, ID; Batten, J; Hukkanen, M; Polak, JM; Hughes, SP (1999). "Nitric oxide mediated vasoreactivity during fracture repair". Clin Orthop Relat Res. 365 (365): 247–53. doi:10.1097/00003086-199908000-00030. PMID 10627709.

==== Infection ====
- Hughes, SP; Want, S; Darrell, JH; Dash, CH; Kennedy, M (1982). "Prophylactic cefuroxime in total joint replacement". Int Orthop. 6 (3): 155–61. doi:10.1007/bf00267725. PMID 7166446. S2CID 35425556.
- Hughes, SP; McCarthy, ID; Fleming, RM; Anderson, FM; Dash, CH (1984). "Extraction of ceftazidime in bone". J Antimicrob Chemother. 14 (3): 285–9. doi:10.1093/jac/14.3.285. PMID 6386787.

==== Intervertebral disc ====
- Wallace, AL; Wyatt, BC; McCarthy, ID; Hughes, SP (1994). "Humoral regulation of blood flow in the vertebral endplate". Spine (Phila Pa 1976). 19 (12): 1324–8. doi:10.1097/00007632-199406000-00004. PMID 8066511. S2CID 8661097.
- "The Cervical Disc". Baillière's Clinical Orthopaedics – International Practice and Research. Vol. 2, Number 2, August 1997.
- "The pathogenesis of degeneration of the intervertebral disc and emerging therapies in the management of back pain". The Bone & Joint Journal, Vol. 94-B, No. 10 (2012), pp. 1298-1304. doi:10.1302/0301-620X.94B10.28986. Co-authored with A. J. Freemont, D. W. Hukins, A. H. McGregor and S. Roberts.
- Espahbodi, S; Doré, CJ; Humphries, KN; Hughes, SP (2013). "Color Doppler ultrasonography of lumbar artery blood flow in patients with low back pain". Spine (Phila Pa 1976). 38 (4): E230-6. doi:10.1097/BRS.0b013e31827ecd6e. PMID 23197013. S2CID 205518965.

==== Humanities ====
- Hughes, SP (2015). "Walter Mercer's (1891-1971) contribution to the surgical treatment of low back pain". J Med Biogr. 23 (2): 108–14. doi:10.1177/0967772014565566. hdl:10044/1/25207. PMID 25697350. S2CID 11621871.
- Hughes, Sean P. F.; Hughes, Sarah (2017). "Keats Memorial Lecture: How did John Keats's Medical Training Influence his Poetry?". The Keats-Shelley Review. 31 (2): 136–146. doi:10.1080/09524142.2017.1369304. S2CID 165599138.
- Hughes, Sean; Gardner-Thorpe, Christopher (2018). "Charles Bell (1774–1842) and Natural Theology". Journal of Medical Biography. 28 (2): 75–82. doi:10.1177/0967772018790736. PMID 30165759. S2CID 52133460.
- Hughes, SP (2018). "Person or system - What leads to surgical advances?". J Med Biogr. 26 (2): 73–79. doi:10.1177/0967772017732440. PMID 28972434. S2CID 41218983.

=== Books ===
- Bone Circulation and Vascularization in Normal and Pathological Conditions. Springer, NATO Science Series: A (1993). ISBN 978-1-4615-2838-8. Co-authored with A. Schoutens, J. Arlet and J.W.M. Gardeniers,
- Musculoskeletal Infections. Yearbook Medical Publishers (1986). Co-authored with R. H. Fitzgerald. ISBN 9780815147619
- Textbook of Orthopaedics and Fractures. Taylor & Francis(1997). ISBN 978-0-340-61381-8. Co-authored with R. W. Porter
- Nitric Oxide in Bone and Joint. Cambridge University Press (2008). Co-authored with Mika V. J. Hukkanen, Julia M. Polak. ISBN 9780521592208

=== Book chapters ===
- "Fibröse Knochendysplasie und Weil-Albright-Syndrom", co-authored with J.R. Döhler in Walter Blauth and Hans-Wolfram Ulrich's Spätergebnisse in der Orthopädie, Springer-Verlag (1986), ISBN 9783642710292.
- “The Regulation of Blood Flow in Bone”, co-authored with Corbett SA, Reichert ILH, McCarthy ID, Osteonecrosis (Urbaniak JR, Jones JP), American Academy of Orthopaedic Surgeons, 1997, Chapter 2, pp. 11–19.
- "The Use of Mesenchymal Stem Cells for Bone and Cartilage Repair", co-authored with R. Behan, N. A. Habib, M. Y. Gordon and N. Levičar. Stem Cell Repair And Regeneration, Imperial College Press, London (2008). ISBN 978-1-86094-980-7.

=== Book reviews ===
- Clinical Disorders of the Shoulder. Lipmann Kessel (Pp 182) Churchill Livingstone (1982). British Medical Journal Vol. 284, 3 April 1982, p. 1036
- The First Transplant Surgeon: The Flawed Genius of Nobel Prize Winner, Alexis Carrel by David Hamilton, British Society for the History of Medicine Book Reviews, January 2017.
