= Raymond Rocco Monto =

Board certified orthopaedic surgeon based out of Massachusetts, US

- Born: November 20, 1960; Ironbound
- Education: Haverford College, Duke University, New York University
- Known for: Treating degenerative joint disease, cartilage damage, Tennis elbow, Achilles tendonitis, and many other therapies and minimally invasive surgical techniques to improve mobility and quality of life.
- Scientific career
- Fields: Orthopaedic surgeon

Raymond Rocco Monto (born November 20, 1960) is a Board Certified orthopaedic surgeon with a practice on Nantucket, Massachusetts. Monto's work includes developments in sports medicine, Tennis elbow surgery, hip arthroscopy, platelet-rich plasma, and orthobiologic treatments for chronic disorders including Achilles tendonitis and plantar fasciitis. Monto lectures frequently in the United States and around the world.

== Background ==
Raymond Rocco Monto was born in Ironbound, New Jersey. He played intercollegiate soccer at Haverford College, where he received a Bachelor of Arts Degree in 1982. He was co-captain of the soccer team and was a regional NSCAA All America selection in 1981. Monto graduated in Biology from Haverford College with a Bachelor of Arts degree. He was inducted into Phi Beta Kappa society in 1981. Monto earned his Doctor of Medicine degree (M.D.) at the New York University School of Medicine in 1986. During medical school he was an all-star goalkeeper in the Cosmopolitan Soccer League first division, reaching the U.S. national championship Final Four in 1983 with the Union Lancers. He completed his orthopedic surgery residency at Duke University in 1992, and was a fellow at the Steadman Hawkins Clinic in knee and shoulder reconstruction.

== Career and awards ==
Monto began his career in Huntingdon Valley, Pennsylvania, before starting the first orthopedic surgery and sports medicine practice on Martha's Vineyard, Massachusetts in 1996. After treating large numbers of metatarsal foot fractures on the island he became known for diagnosing the "Vineyard fracture". In a controversial move in 2013, he relocated his practice to Nantucket. He is a media spokesperson and fellow of the American Academy of Orthopaedic Surgeons Monto has won several awards, including the 2012 Jacques Duparc research award from the European Federation of National Associations of Orthopaedics and Traumatology for his work on tennis elbow; the 2014 European Hip Society Research Finalist Award; the Smith-Nephew Resident Scholar Award, the Piedmont Orthopedic Society Research Award from Duke University, the Smith & Nephew Orthopedic Resident Scholar Award, and the Magill Rhoads Scholar Award from Haverford College. Monto has lectured extensively across the United States and Europe, giving over 100 presentations and demonstrating orthopedic innovations including the use of platelet rich plasma and novel total knee arthroplasty techniques. Monto serves as a consultant reviewer for many international orthopedic journals including the Journal of Bone and Joint Surgery, Bone and Joint Research, and Arthroscopy. He is a lead team physician for United States Soccer and has been a sports medicine consultant to the United States Ski Team, Boston Ballet, and Real Madrid C.F., and has served in many capacities for Nantucket Cottage Hospital including chief administrative officer, president of the medical staff, chief of surgery, director of physical therapy and sports medicine, and member of the hospital's board of trustees. Monto's first book, The Fountain: A Doctor's Prescription to Make 60 the New 30 was published by Rodale Books Penguin Random House in 2018. Dr. Monto founded Oceanus Health, a private clinic specializing in regenerative medicine and longevity in 2025.

== Publications ==
Additionally, Monto has published numerous medical articles in peer-reviewed journals.

Partial list:

- "Engineered bone graft." (July 2016) American Journal of Orthopedics. http://www.mdedge.com/amjorthopedics/article/109998/engineered-bone-graft
- Monto, Raymond Rocco (September 2014). "Tennis Elbow Repair With or Without Suture Anchors: A Randomized Clinical Trial". Techniques in Shoulder & Elbow Surgery. 15 (3): 92–97. doi:10.1097/BTE.0000000000000027. S2CID 58020081.
- Monto, Raymond Rocco (April 2014). "Platelet-Rich Plasma Efficacy Versus Corticosteroid Injection Treatment for Chronic Severe Plantar Fasciitis". Foot & Ankle International. 35 (4): 313–318. doi:10.1177/1071100713519778. PMID 24419823. S2CID 206652513.
- Monto, Raymond R. (December 2013). "Platelet-rich Plasma and Plantar Fasciitis". Sports Medicine and Arthroscopy Review. 21 (4): 220–224. doi:10.1097/JSA.0b013e318297fa8d. PMID 24212370. S2CID 5968932.
- Monto, Raymond Rocco (May 2012). "Platelet Rich Plasma Treatment for Chronic Achilles Tendinosis". Foot & Ankle International. 33 (5): 379–385. doi:10.3113/FAI.2012.0379. PMID 22735279. S2CID 9990062.
- Monto, Raymond; Cameron-Donaldson, Michelle; Close, Matthew; Ho, Charles; Hawkins, Richard (25 January 2010). "Magnetic Resonance Imaging in the Evaluation of Tibial Eminence Fractures in Adults". The Journal of Knee Surgery. 19 (3): 187–190. doi:10.1055/s-0030-1248104. PMID 16893157. S2CID 20486926.
- Moorman, CT; Monto, RR; Bassett, FH (February 1992). "So-called trigger ankle due to an aberrant flexor hallucis longus muscle in a tennis player. A case report". The Journal of Bone and Joint Surgery. American Volume. 74 (2): 294–295. PMID 1541624.
- Howard, WT; Monto, RR; Hardaker, WT (August 1991). "Medical support for athletic events". Physician Assistant (American Academy of Physician Assistants). 15 (8): 41–44. PMID 10113049.
- Monto, Raymond Rocco; Moorman, Claude T.; Mallon, William J.; Nunley, James A. (June 1991). "Rupture of the Posterior Tibial Tendon Associated with Closed Ankle Fracture". Foot & Ankle. 11 (6): 400–403. doi:10.1177/107110079101100612. PMID 1894236. S2CID 22044403.
- Monto, Raymond Rocco; Garcia, Julian; Callaghan, John J. (December 1990). "Fatal fat embolism following total condylar knee arthroplasty". The Journal of Arthroplasty. 5 (4): 291–299. doi:10.1016/s0883-5403(08)80086-1. PMID 2290083.
- Monto, RR; Bassett, FH; Hardaker, WT (November 1990). "Team physician #9. The role and responsibilities of the competition physician". Orthopaedic Review. 19 (11): 1015–1020. PMID 2270176.
