= Hunterian Professorship =

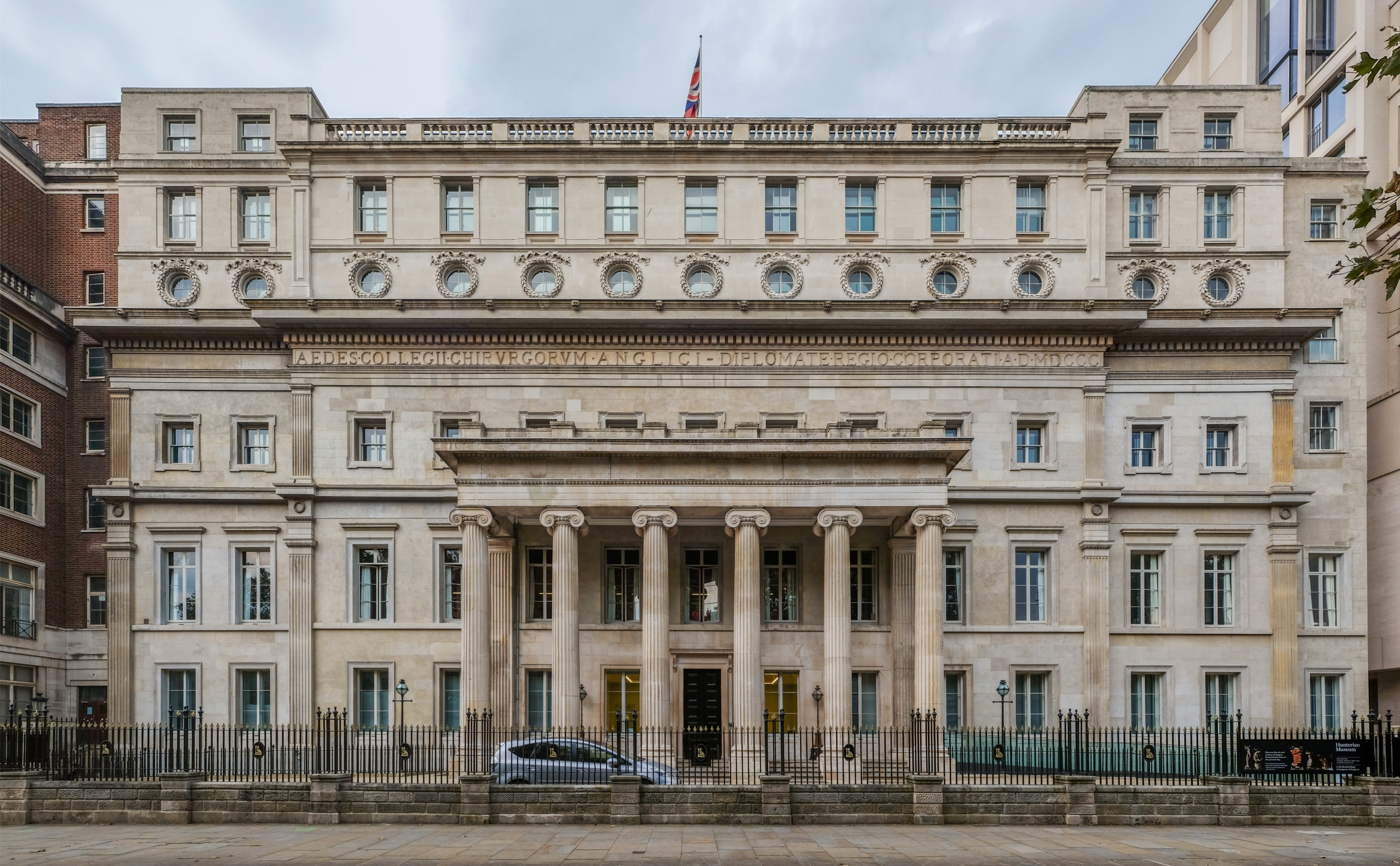
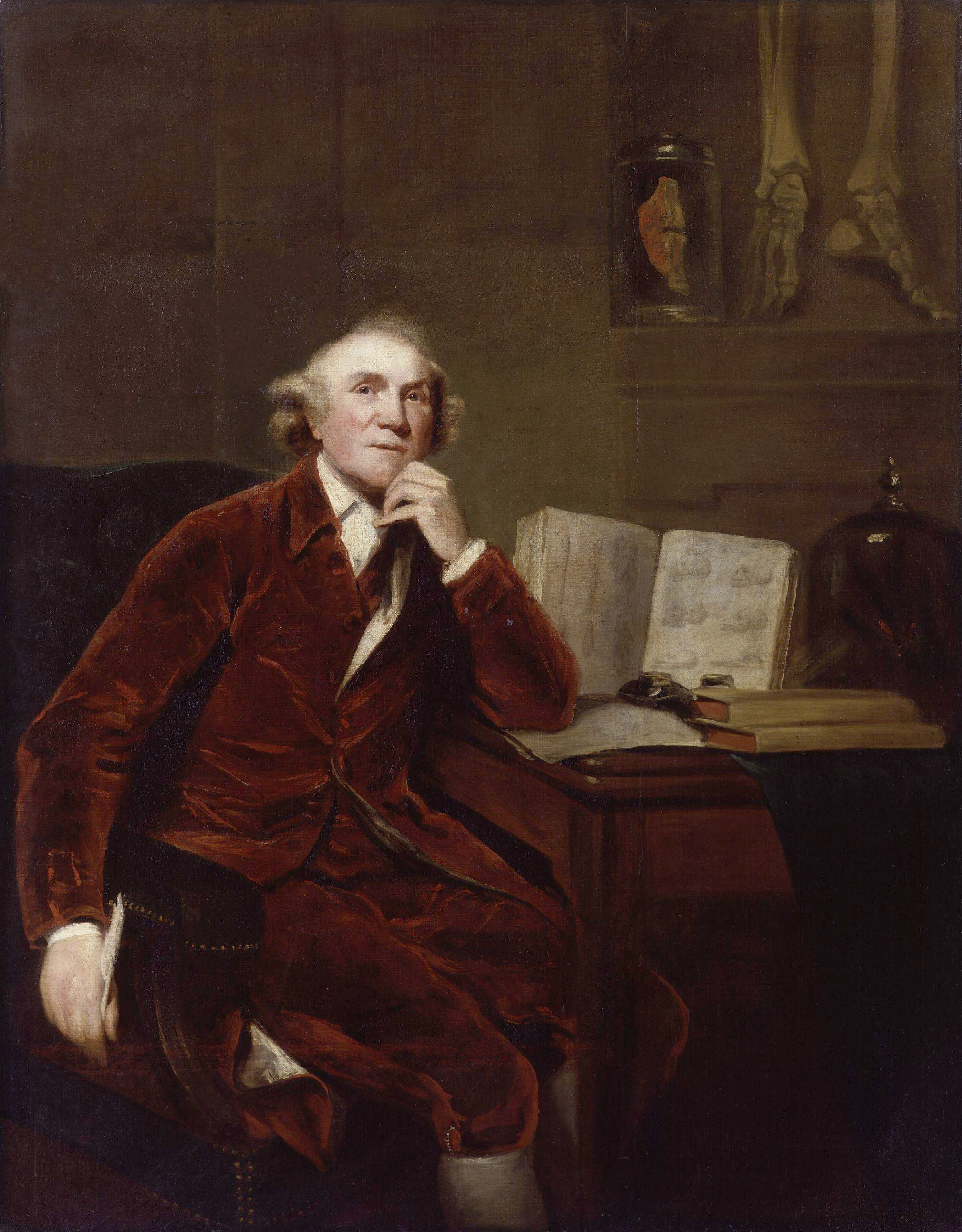
Hunterian Professorship Royal College of Surgeons of England (top) and John Hunter by John Jackson (below)
- Established: 1810
- Faculty: Royal College of Surgeons of England
- Website: Royal College of Surgeons of England

The Hunterian Professorship, named after John Hunter, is the title awarded to a surgeon who is elected to deliver the Hunterian lecture at the Royal College of Surgeons of England (RCSE). According to British surgeon Harold Ellis, the list of Hunterian professors reflects the history of British surgery.

== History ==
=== Founding ===
In 1799, nearly six years after John Hunter's death, the executors of his estate sold his museum, which included an extensive collection of anatomical specimens, to the British government. Later that year, the Treasury offered the museum to the RCSE (then known as the Company of Surgeons) under various conditions for its safekeeping. After some negotiation regarding small particulars, the museum was transferred to the RCSE in December 1799, with the final trust deed containing the clause:

That one Course of Lectures, not less than twenty-four in number, on Comparative Anatomy and other subjects, illustrated by the preparations, shall be given every year by some Member of the Company.

The following year, the RCSE set up a Board of Curators to oversee the museum collection, and it was decided to begin construction of a new building to house it next to the RCSE's offices in Lincoln's Inn Fields. During this period, educational activities were almost wholly suspended at the RCSE, with the first series of Hunterian lectures being delayed until 1810, and the second series until 1813, the year construction was completed, enabling the collection to finally be moved.

In May 1813, in preparation for the 1814 lecture series, the RCSE created ongoing Hunterian Professorships in comparative anatomy and surgery. For the following two decades, lecturing duties would be split roughly equally between the two positions.

=== 1830s restructuring ===
In 1831 the Hunterian Lectures were suspended, following unrest led by the surgeon and medical reformer Thomas Wakley. They resumed in 1832 under stricter control, only to be suspended again between 1834–1836 while the Hunterian Museum was rebuilt.

In April 1836, to prepare for its grand reopening, the RCSE elected Richard Owen as Hunterian Professor of Comparative Anatomy alongside Edward Stanley as Hunterian Professor of Surgery, on the understanding that Owen would present twenty-four lectures each year, beginning in May 1837 after the six surgical lectures presented by Stanley. Owen was to continue this regimen for almost twenty years (Note: Except perhaps for 1839, where Plarr lists Frederick Tyrrell as presenting three lectures on surgery, with Owen presenting the remaining twenty-one.) until his 1856 departure for the British Museum.

=== Later reforms ===
In 1894, to make it easier to find lecturers, the Lords of the Treasury agreed to revise the Clause to:

That one course of lectures, not less than 12 in number, on comparative anatomy and other subjects, illustrated by preparations from the Hunterian Collection and the other contents of the Museum, shall be given every year by Fellows or Members of the College.

The rules were altered in 1961 with the addition of:

Additional lectures, not exceeding three in number, on medical or dental subjects, may be given every year by the Fellows or members of the College, Fellows in Dental Surgery or Fellows in the Faculty of Anaesthetists.

== Notable Past Hunterian Professors ==
=== 19th century ===
List of Hunterian Professors
Lecture series	Domain	Image	Name	Notes
1810, 1813, 1822	Comparative anatomy		Everard Home	
1814–1815	Comparative anatomy		Astley Cooper	
1816–1819	Comparative anatomy		William Lawrence	
1820–1821, 1823	Comparative anatomy		Benjamin Collins Brodie	
1824–1828	Comparative anatomy		Joseph Henry Green	
1829–1830	Comparative anatomy		Herbert Mayo	
1832–1833	Comparative anatomy		Charles Bell	
1837–1855	Comparative anatomy (Note: The 1900 Dictionary of National Biography instead lists Owen as the Royal College of Surgeons' "first Hunterian professor of comparative anatomy and physiology".)		Richard Owen	
1857–1859	Comparative anatomy and physiology		George Busk	
1860–1861	Comparative anatomy and physiology		William Scovell Savory	
1862–1863	Comparative anatomy and physiology		George Gulliver	
1863–1869	Comparative anatomy and physiology		Thomas Henry Huxley	
1870–1873; 1876–1884 (shared)	Comparative anatomy and physiology		William Henry Flower	
1874–1875; 1876–1885 (shared)	Comparative anatomy and physiology		William Kitchen Parker	
1885–1887 (shared); 1889–1900 (shared)	Comparative anatomy and physiology N/A (from 1895)		Charles Stewart	
1885–1886 (shared)	Comparative anatomy and physiology		Sir Frederick Treves	
1885–1886 (shared)	Comparative anatomy and physiology		Alexander Hill	
1885–1886 (shared)	Comparative anatomy and physiology		William Arthur Brailey	
Appointed 1888–1889 (Note: Plarr's Lives of the Fellows states Bland-Sutton "was a Hunterian professor of comparative anatomy and physiology for the years 1888-89". Earlier, in 1900, rather than stating that Bland-Sutton had presented a Hunterian Lecture during this time period, Plarr had instead listed him as an Erasmus Wilson Lecturer for the years 1886–1887 and 1889–1891.)	Comparative anatomy and physiology		John Bland-Sutton	
1810	Surgery		William Blizard	
1814–1817	Surgery		John Abernethy	
1878	Surgery and pathology		Thomas Spencer Wells	

=== 20th & 21st century ===
List of Hunterian Professors
Year	Image	Name	Notes
1904		John Lockhart-Mummery	
1913		Wilfred Trotter	
1916		John Bland-Sutton	
1930s		Berkeley Moynihan	
1970		Graham Stack	
		Lord Ara Darzi	
2024		Rajarshi Mukherjee	

== See also ==
- Arris and Gale Lecture
- Hunterian Oration
