= Graham Stack (surgeon) =

British orthopedic surgeon (1915–1992)

Graham Stack MRCS, FRCS, LRCP
- Born: Hugh Graham Stack; 7 December 1915; Bristol, England
- Died: 28 May 1992 (aged 76)
- Education: Clifton College; University of Bristol
- Known for: Naming fingers rather than numbering them
- Medical career
- Profession: Surgeon
- Field: Orthopaedic surgery
- Institutions: Addenbrooke's Hospital; Royal National Orthopaedic Hospital; Miller General Hospital
- Sub-specialties: Hand surgery
- Awards: Hunterian Professorship; Arris and Gale Lecture

Hugh Graham Stack FRCS (7 December 1915 – 28 May 1992) was a British orthopaedic surgeon with a specialism in surgery of the hand. He was secretary of the Second Hand Club and was instrumental in the merger of the British hand surgery organisations to become the British Society for Surgery of the Hand.

== Early life and education ==
Hugh Stack was born in Bristol on 7 December 1915, the third son of Edward H. E. Stack, an ophthalmic surgeon at the Bristol Royal Infirmary, and his wife Caroline, née Kennedy. He was educated at Clifton College, following which he received a scholarship to study chemistry at Bristol University. Three years later he switched career and enrolled at St Bartholemew's Hospital in London, to study medicine.

== Career ==
Stack first worked as a house surgeon at Addenbrooke's Hospital, the Royal National Orthopaedic Hospital and the Miller General Hospital, Greenwich, after which he served for two years in the Royal Navy Volunteer Reserve. He was then honorary demonstrator in anatomy at King's College, London, and subsequently a surgical registrar at the North Middlesex Hospital. He became a fellow of the Royal College of Surgeons in 1951 and from then on practised as an orthopaedic surgeon.

He then held appointments at the Miller Hospital and St. Bartholomew's Hospital, the Albert Dock Orthopaedic and Fracture Hospital, and the Harold Wood and Brentwood District Hospitals. It was while he was at St Bartholomew's that he became interested in reconstructive surgery of the hand in which he was influenced by Jackson Burrows, Osmond Clark, Norman Capener and Guy Pulvertaft.

In 1969, he wrote an influential article which highlighted the importance of naming the fingers (thumb, index, middle, ring, little) rather than numbering them (1, 2, 3, 4, 5), to avoid surgery on the wrong finger. In 1973, he was secretary of the Second Hand Club and was instrumental in the merger of the British hand surgery organisations to become the British Society for Surgery of the Hand. He was the first editor of The Hand, the forerunner of the Journal of Hand Surgery. He devised a splint - known as the Stack Splint - for the management of soft tissue mallet fingers.

In 1970, he was elected Hunterian Professor by the Royal College of Surgeons of England.

== Family ==
Stack married Lorna Cooke MRCP, in 1955. They had a daughter, Caroline, and a son, Charles, who became an anaesthetist.

== Death and legacy ==
Stack died on 28 May 1992. The Graham Stack travelling fellowship is awarded in his memory.

== Selected publications ==
=== Articles ===
- Stack, H.Graham (1960). "New Retractor for Hand Surgery". The Lancet. 275 (7137): 1278. doi:10.1016/S0140-6736(60)92256-X.
- Stack, H. Graham (1962). "Muscle Function in the Fingers". The Journal of Bone and Joint Surgery. British Volume. 44-B (4): 899–909. doi:10.1302/0301-620X.44B4.899.
- Stack, H. G. (1964). "Tumours of the Hand". Postgrad Med J. 40 (463): 290–8. doi:10.1136/pgmj.40.463.290. PMC 2482875. PMID 14145050.
- Stack, H. Graham (1969). "Mallet Finger". Hand. 1 (2): 83–89. doi:10.1016/0072-968X(69)90069-2. S2CID 37791015.
- Stack, H. Graham (1969). "Naming the Fingers". Hand. 1 (2): 146–150. doi:10.1016/0072-968X(69)90084-9. S2CID 74251649.
- Stack, H. Graham (1971). "Button hole deformity". Hand. 3 (2): 152–4. doi:10.1016/0072-968x(71)90034-9. PMID 5127922. S2CID 208214362., pp. 152–4.
- Burchell, Geoffrey; Stack, Graham (June 1973). "Exsanguination of the arm and hand". The Hand. 5 (2): 124–6. doi:10.1016/0072-968X(73)90052-1. PMID 4715693. S2CID 10607466.
- "Second Hand Club", British Society for Surgery of the Hand, 1975, ISBN 9780950101910.
- Stack, Graham (1981). "Glass injuries". Hand. 13 (2): 111. doi:10.1016/s0072-968x(81)80049-6. PMID 7286794. S2CID 5109399.
- Burchell, Geoffrey (1973). "Exsanguination of the Arm and Hand". Hand. 5 (2): 124–126. doi:10.1016/0072-968X(73)90052-1. PMID 4715693. S2CID 10607466.

=== Lectures ===
- Arris and Gale Lecture: "A Study of Muscle Function in the Fingers", Royal College of Surgeons, 28 May 1963.
- Hunterian lecture: "The palmar fascia, and the development of deformities and displacemants in Dupuytren's contracture", Annals of the Royal College of Surgeons England. 1971.

=== Chapters ===
- "Tumours" in R. Guy Pulvertaft (Ed.) Clinical Surgery: Volume 7 The Hand. Butterworths, 1966. pp. 208–228.
