= Thomas Spencer Wells =

British surgeon (1818–1897)

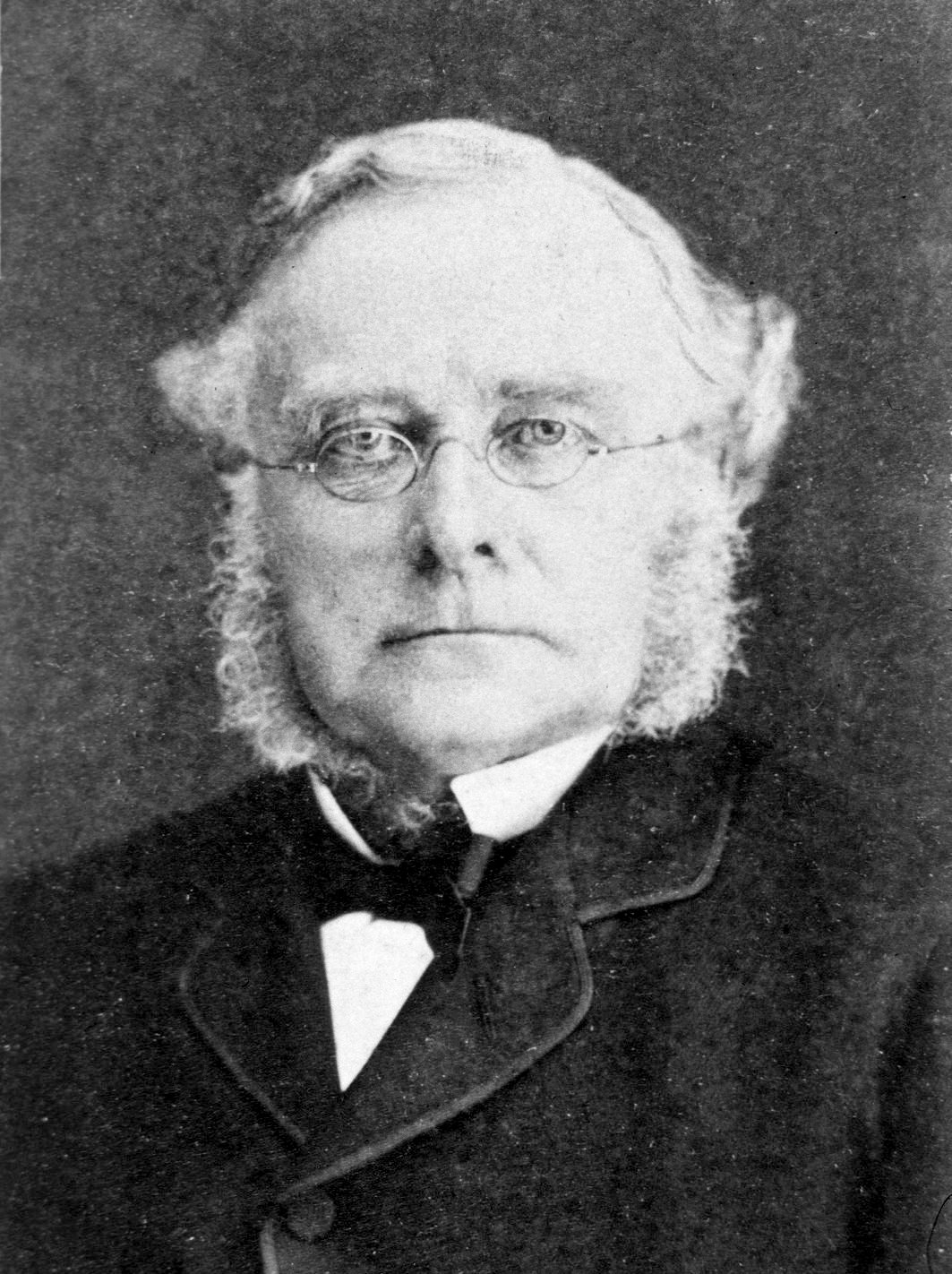
Thomas Spencer Wells

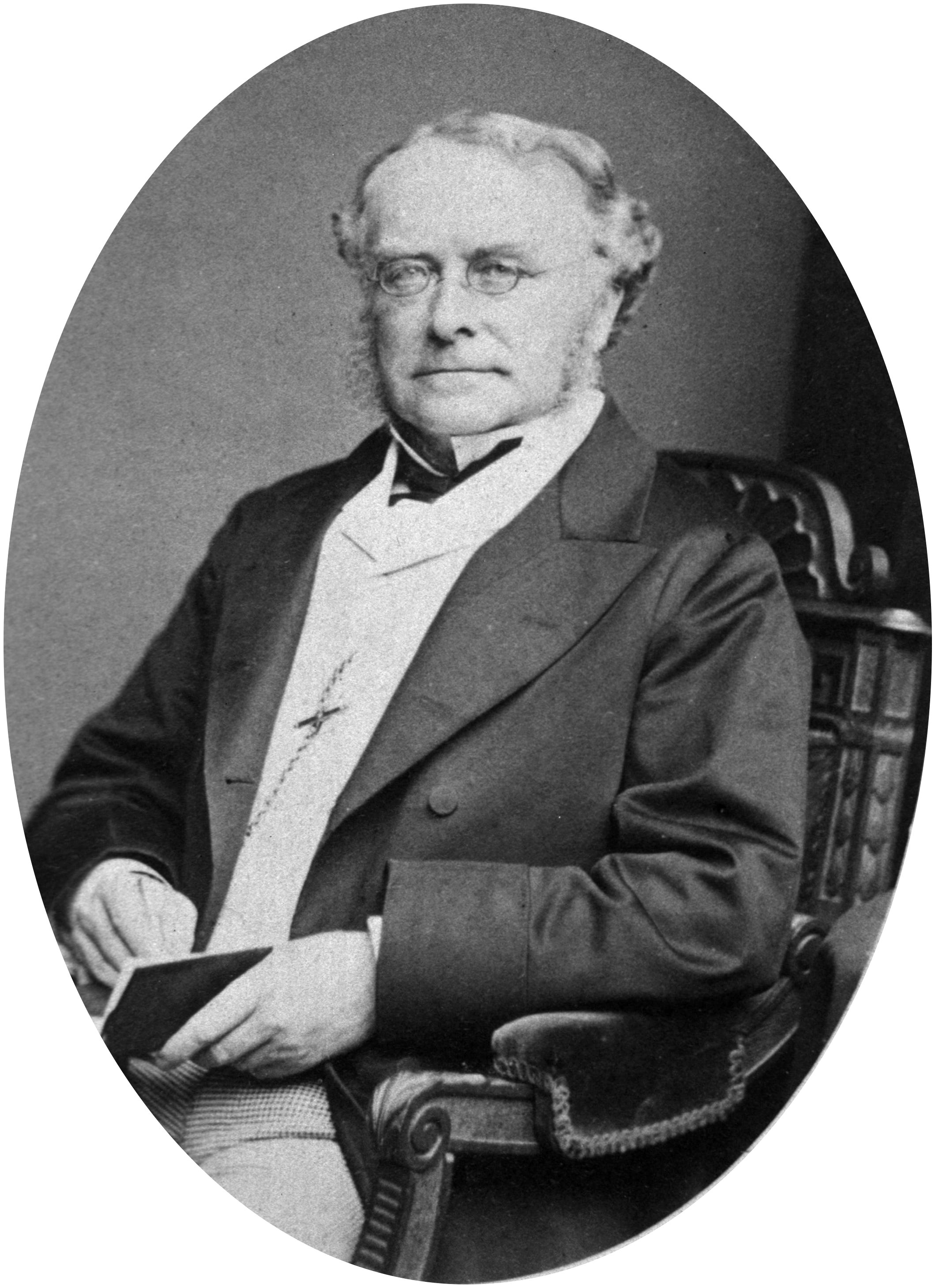
Thomas Spencer Wells

Sir Thomas Spencer Wells, 1st Baronet (3 February 1818 – 31 January 1897) was surgeon to Queen Victoria, a medical professor and president of the Royal College of Surgeons of England.

== Early life ==
He was born at St Albans, Hertfordshire and received his early education at St Albans School (then located in the Lady Chapel of the Abbey).

== Career ==
After a short time as a pupil of a surgeon in Barnsley (Yorkshire), he studied medicine at Leeds, Trinity College Dublin, St Thomas' Hospital (becoming a Member of the Royal College of Surgeons (MRCS) in 1841 and a Fellow (FRCS) in 1844), and later in Paris, France.

He served as a naval surgeon in Malta, and then established his own ophthalmic surgery practice in London in 1853. In the same year he married Elizabeth Wright. In 1854, and from 1856 to 78, he was the surgeon of the Samaritan Free Hospital for Women, London (serving in between as an army surgeon in the Crimean War). He also lectured at the Grosvenor School of Medicine (which later became the medical school of St George's Hospital). In 1877 was appointed Hunterian Professor of Surgery and Pathology at the Royal College of Surgeons of England (of which he was elected president in 1883, in the same year he was created baronet). From 1863 to 1896 he was surgeon to Queen Victoria's household.

Wells specialized in obstetrics and ophthalmic surgery. He is recognized as a pioneer in abdominal surgery and is notable for having perfected ovariotomy. In 1879, his name was given to his invention of an improved pattern of artery forceps, which prevented entanglement of surrounding structures by the handles of the implement when in use. He was also one of the earliest surgeons to make use of anaesthetics in operations. He published a number of important medical books and articles.

Thomas Spencer Wells was elected member of Leopoldina in 1886.

== Later life ==
He died after an attack of apoplexy on 31 January 1897 and is buried in Brompton Cemetery. His Hampstead estate was sold to the London County Council and turned into a park.

Baronetage of the United Kingdom
New creation	Baronet (of Upper Grosvenor Street); 1883–1897	Succeeded by Arthur Spencer Wells
