= Journal of Hand Surgery (European Volume) =

- Discipline: Surgery
- Language: English
- Edited by: Jane McEachan

Publication details
- Former names: Journal of Hand Surgery (British and European Volume); Journal of Hand Surgery (British Volume); The Hand
- History: 1969-present
- Publisher: SAGE Publications
- Frequency: 11/year
- Impact factor: 2.648 (2018)

Standard abbreviations
- ISO 4: J. Hand Surg. Eur. Vol.

Indexing
- ISSN: 1753-1934 (print); 2043-6289 (web)
- OCLC no.: 237129362

Links
- Journal homepage; Online access; Online archive

The Journal of Hand Surgery (European Volume) is a peer-reviewed medical journal that covers the fields of orthopedics and surgery as related to the human hand. The editor-in-chief is Jane McEachan. It was established in 1969 and is published by SAGE Publications on behalf of the British Society for Surgery of the Hand.

== Abstracting and indexing ==
The journal is abstracted and indexed in Scopus and the Science Citation Index Expanded. According to the Journal Citation Reports, its 2025 impact factor is 2.1.
