= Rüdiger Döhler =

German professor of orthopaedic surgery (1948–2022)

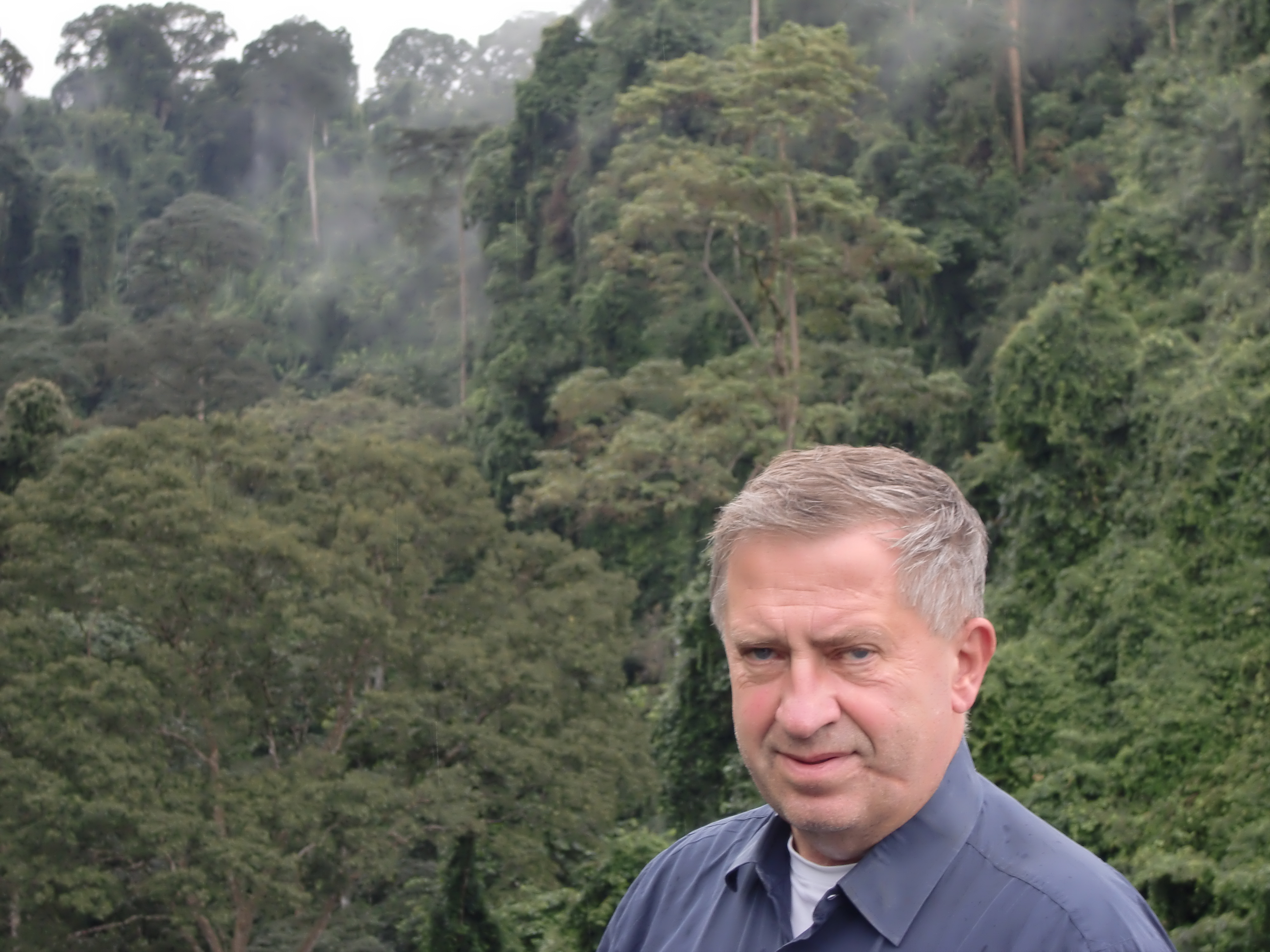
Rüdiger Döhler in 2010

Rüdiger Döhler FRCSEd (24 August 1948 – 28 September 2022) was a German professor of orthopedic surgery.

== Life ==
Döhler grew up in Rochlitz and East Berlin. In 1958, his family fled from the GDR to Bremerhaven (then Port of Embarkation for the US troops in Germany). After graduating from a classic-languages school he joined the German Navy and from 1968 through 1974 studied medicine in Kiel with a break in Hamburg and Heidelberg.

In 2014 he moved again to Plau am See, where he died on 28 September 2022.

=== Clinical career ===
In 1976, Döhler was awarded his doctoral degree at the University of Kiel. He was trained in pathology (L.-D. Leder, Essen), surgery (G. Heinemann, Minden) and orthopedics (W. Blauth, Kiel) and achieved the acknowledgement as orthopedic surgeon in 1983.

In March 1984, he went to Edinburgh and did clinical work at the Princess Margaret Rose Orthopaedic Hospital and, with a grant of the Deutsche Forschungsgemeinschaft (German Research Council), performed basic research at the University of Edinburgh (Sean P. F. Hughes).

In August 1985 he returned to Kiel, and three years later he moved to the University of Münster for spinal surgery (H. H. Matthiass). In 1990, he quit cold orthopedics and re-embarked on (trauma) surgery in Hamburg-Altona. There, he achieved his second acknowledgement as general surgeon (1992) and finished his habilitation with the neuroanatomist Werner Lierse.

After German unification in 1995, he was appointed head of the then new hospital in Plau am See, Mecklenburg (former GDR).

Döhler operated on children from Africa and Central Asia for the Friedensdorf International and, on behalf of the Foundation Remembrance, Responsibility and Future, on former Nazi slave laborers from Poland and Ukraine.

=== Military ===
For becoming a reserve officer Döhler joined the German Navy in October 1967. While studying medicine he had his military training in the Territorials.

== Publications (selected) ==
- with S.P.F. Hughes: Fibrous dysplasia of bone and the Weil-Albright syndrome. International Orthopaedics, 10, p. 53-62, 1986
- Verletzungsfolgen an Bewegungsapparat und Wirbelsäule (Sequelae of trauma). In: A. Reichelt (Ed.), Orthopädie. Stuttgart 1993 ISBN 3-432-25201-3
- Lexikon orthopädische Chirurgie (Lexical textbook of orthopaedic surgery). Berlin (Springer) 2003 ISBN 3-540-41317-0
- Brauchen wir neue Hüftendoprothesen? (Do we need new hips?). Chirurgische Allgemeine 7 (2006), S. 471-475
- M. Liehn, I. Middelanis-Neumann, L. Steinmüller, J. R. Döhler (Ed.): OP-Handbuch. Grundlagen, Instrumentarium, OP-Ablauf (Handbook for OR staff), 4. ed.. Berlin, Heidelberg (Springer) 2007 ISBN 978-3-540-72269-4
- Corps Masovia, München (Aventinus) 2005 ISBN 3-00-016108-2
- Der Deutsche Idealismus und das Corpsstudententum, in: S. Sigler (Ed.) Freundschaft und Toleranz. 200 Jahre Corps Bavaria zu Landshut und München, München (Akademischer Verlag) 2006, S. 183-188 ISBN 3-932965-86-8
- Der Seniorenconvent zu Königsberg. Ostpreußen und seine Corps vor dem Untergang (Königsberg and East Prussia between the World Wars). Einst und Jetzt: Teil I - Bd. 52 (2007), S. 147-176 ISSN 0420-8870, Teil II - Bd. 54 (2009), S. 219-288 ISSN 0420-8870
- Siegfried Schindelmeiser: Die Albertina und ihre Studenten 1544 bis WS 1850/51 und Die Geschichte des Corps Baltia II zu Königsberg i. Pr. (1970-1985). (The Albertus University and the Corps Baltia). Erstmals vollständige, bebilderte und kommentierte Neuausgabe in zwei Bänden mit einem Anhang, zwei Registern und einem Vorwort von Franz-Friedrich Prinz von Preußen, herausgegeben von R. Döhler und G. v. Klitzing, München 2010 ISBN 978-3-00-028704-6
- Säulen Preußens - 59 Corpsstudenten als Oberpräsidenten preußischer Provinzen. Einst und Jetzt 55 (2010), S. 143-148 ISBN 978-3-87707-781-8
