= Herbert Haxton =

Scottish surgeon

Herbert Haxton FRCS FRSE
- Born: 1913; St Andrews, Scotland
- Died: 30 April 2009 (aged 95–96)
- Education: Madras College; University of St Andrews
- Occupation: Physician
- Known for: Surgical techniques in suturing; Importance of the patella
- Medical career
- Profession: Surgeon
- Institutions: Royal Manchester Children's Hospital; Manchester North Hospital and Crumpsall Hospital

Herbert Alexander Haxton FRCS FRSE (1913 – 30 April 2009) was a Scottish surgeon to the Royal Manchester Children's Hospital and the Manchester North Hospital and Crumpsall Hospital. He contributed to surgical techniques of suturing and investigated the function of the sympathetic nervous system in the sweating conditions hyperhidrosis and gustatory hyperhidrosis.

In his early career he published research on the ankle, elbow, hip, knee and ankle joints and he taught anatomy at St Andrews University, where he demonstrated that the kneecap was not just to protect the knee but important for straightening the leg.

He gave three Arris and Gale Lectures at the Royal College of Surgeons of England, and was elected to a Hunterian Professorship in 1946. In 1971 he published his book Surgical Techniques. In the same year he was elected fellow of the Royal Society of Edinburgh.

== Early life and education ==
Herbert Haxton was born in St Andrews, Scotland, in 1913, and was the son of a grocer. He attended Madras College and subsequently gained admission to study medicine at the University of St Andrews, from where he graduated as a Bachelor of Science in 1934 and then Bachelor of Medicine in 1937. At university he become a scratch golfer.

== Early career ==
After graduating he took an appointment as resident surgical officer at the Dundee Royal Infirmary. In 1939 he became lecturer in anatomy back at St Andrews, where he taught James Black (the inventor of propanolol and cimetidine), who would one day become a Nobel Laureate. In 1942 Haxton became a fellow of the Royal College of Surgeons.

Prior to the 19th century, most patella fractures were treated conservatively with splinting, leaving people with pain and disability in the long term. Partial understanding of the importance of the patella led to the trend of removing the whole patella, also resulting in pain, disability and dissatisfaction. In 1944, while at St Andrews, Haxton's experiments proved that the kneecap was not just to protect the knee but important for straightening the leg. On comparing patellas of several mammals, he concluded that the patella has a "functional value in extension of the knee joint". He also showed that there was an increase in degeneration of the distant end of the thigh bone if the patella was removed. Subsequently, following patella fractures, efforts were made to preserve the patella where possible. For his work on muscle function mechanics he was awarded a Masters in Surgery in 1944 and an MD in 1946. In 1943, he returned to work briefly at the Dundee Royal Infirmary. In the same year, he gave two Arris and Gale Lectures at the Royal College of Surgeons of England; one on "The Function of the Patella", the other on "The Anatomy of Progression". His research on the ankle, elbow, hip, knee and ankle joints were published in anatomy and physiology journals.

During the Second World War, he served as surgeon in the Royal Army Medical Corps. By 1944 he returned to surgical training and took up a post as senior registrar at the Radcliffe Infirmary in Oxford, before moving to Manchester Royal Infirmary to be chief assistant in surgery. His contributions towards surgical techniques of the time included better ways of closing wounds to the abdomen by developing a method of measuring pressure inside the abdomen, evaluating the timing of removing sutures and appraising the efficacy of catgut as suture material, which he showed were more irritant than nylon stitches.

== Later career ==
In 1946 he became consultant surgeon to the Royal Manchester Children's Hospital and the Manchester North Hospital and Crumpsall Hospital, where he wrote on the surgery of the gut, blood vessels and congenital heart disease. He investigated the function of the sympathetic nervous system in the sweating conditions hyperhidrosis and gustatory hyperhidrosis. He was awarded a Hunterian Professorship in 1946 when he used his findings to form both his lecture that year and a third Arris and Gale Lecture in 1953.

Haxton co-founded the European Society of CardioVascular Surgery. The Cardiovascular Society of Chile made him an honorary fellow and he became a member of the Brazilian Society of Angiology.

In 1971 he published his book Surgical Techniques. In the same year he was elected fellow of the Royal Society of Edinburgh.

== Personal and family ==
Haxton represented Cheshire as a golfer at inter-county level and in 1949 was semi-finalist in the County Championship. In 1962 he won the national dinghy sailing championships.

He married Muriel and they had three daughters.

== Later life ==
Haxton retired to Cornwall in order to take advantage of the sailing there, but later moved to Blairgowrie in Scotland. He died at Muirton Nursing Home, Blairgowrie, on 30 April 2009. His funeral was at Perth Crematorium.

== Selected publications ==
=== Articles ===
- Haxton, H. (1944). "The patella index in mammals". Journal of Anatomy. 78 (Pt 3): 106–107. PMC 1272514. PMID 17104944.
- "The function of the patella and the effects of its excision". Surgery, Gynecology and Obstetrics. 80: 389–395. 1945.
- HAXTON HA (11 June 1949). "Chemical Sympathectomy". British Medical Journal. 1 (4614): 1026–1028. doi:10.1136/bmj.1.4614.1026. ISSN 0007-1447. PMC 2050302. PMID 18131640.
- Haxton, Herbert (March 1963). "The absorption of catgut in human abdominal wounds". The British Journal of Surgery. 50 (223): 534–536. doi:10.1002/bjs.18005022315. ISSN 0007-1323. PMID 13953240. S2CID 46715913.
- Haxton, H. (March 1968). "Late results of resection for coarctation of the aorta". Proceedings of the Royal Society of Medicine. 61 (3): 296–297. doi:10.1177/003591576806100342. ISSN 0035-9157. PMC 1902280. PMID 5645968.

=== Books ===
- Surgical Techniques. John Wright. 1970. ISBN 978-0-7236-0270-5.
