= British Society for Surgery of the Hand =

British medical specialty society

- Arms of the BSSH, motto Manus Reficiantur Manibus
- Abbreviation: BSSH
- Formation: 1956
- Type: Surgical association
- Headquarters: Lincoln's Inn Fields, London.
- Region served: United Kingdom
- Members: c. 800
- Main organ: The Journal of Hand Surgery
- Website: https://www.bssh.ac.uk

The British Society for Surgery of the Hand exists to "promote and direct the development of Hand Surgery, to foster and co-ordinate education, study and research in Hand Surgery, and to disseminate knowledge of Hand Surgery among members of the medical and allied health professions."

The ethos the society is to promote harmony between orthopaedic and plastic surgeons, which derives from its origins immediately after the Second World War during which new methods of treatment of wounded airmen were developed by surgeons including Patrick Clarkson.

== History ==
The society was formed as the Second Hand Club in 1956 at the instigation of Graham Stack after the original Hand Club, formed by plastic surgeon Patrick Clarkson in 1952, refused to admit younger surgeons.

In the late 1960s it became the British Club for Surgery of the Hand and in 1968 adopted its current name and a formal constitution. The first president was Guy Pulvertaft. Other notable surgeons to participate were Rainsford Mowlem, J. I. P. James, and John Barron.

The society became a registered charity in 1975.

== Activities ==
The society is recognised as an institution that provides education and training in its field:

- With the University of Manchester, it runs a postgraduate certification in hand surgery.
- It has funded an INDICATE Pilot Study, to investigate whether a steroid injection given in the first instance has a better outcome than performing surgery for people with moderate carpal tunnel syndrome.
- The society has collaborated with the British Orthopaedic Association (BOA), to advise the National Institute for Clinical Excellence, on the best management of distal radial fractures.
- The society produces a peer-reviewed academic journal, The Journal of Hand Surgery, jointly with the Federation of European Societies for Surgery of the Hand.

== Selected publications ==
- Best Practice for Management of Distal Radial Fractures (DRFs). London, 2018. (With the British Orthopaedic Association)
