= Sarah Hughes (journalist) =

British journalist (1972–2021)

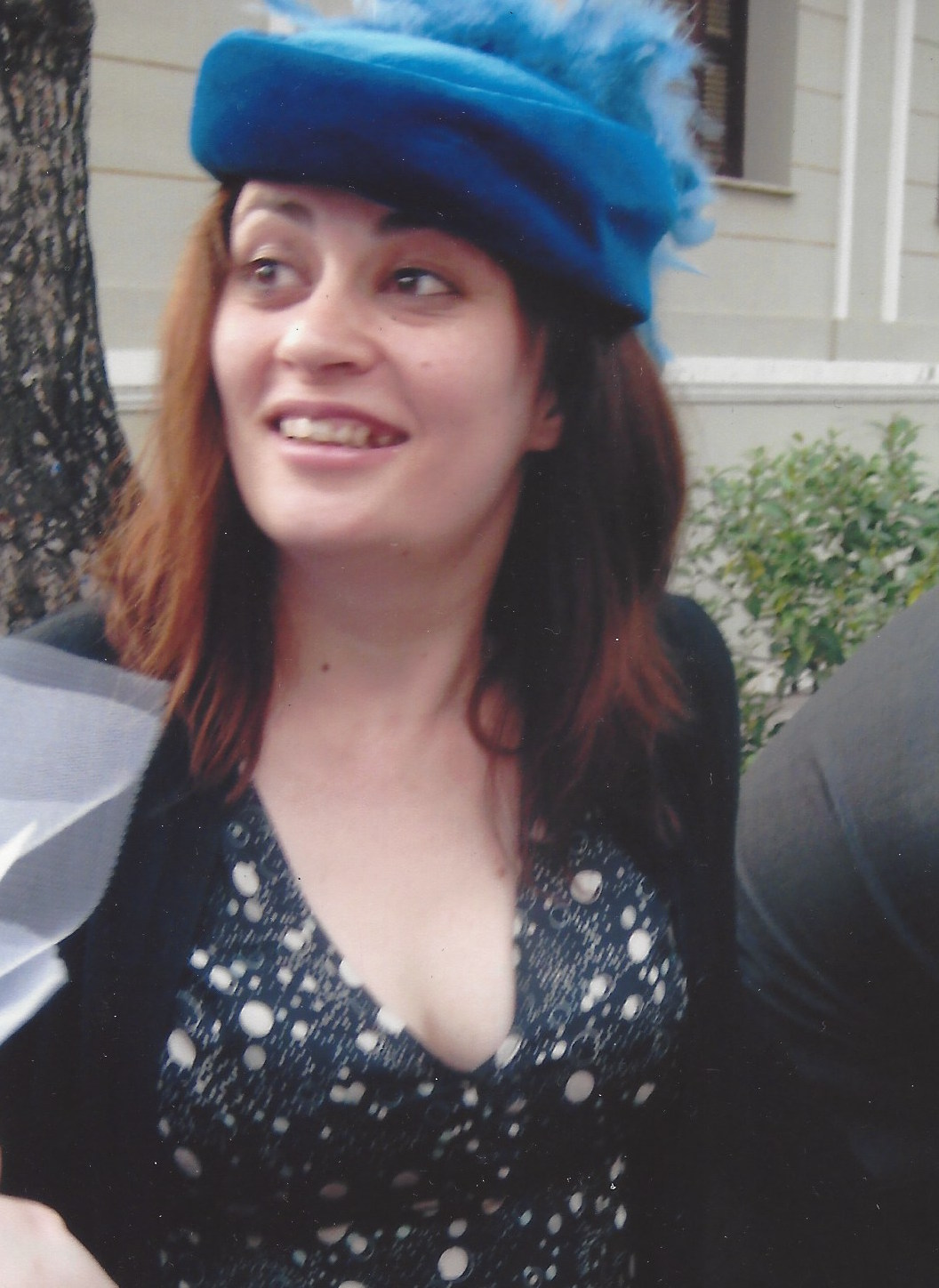
- Sarah Hughes (Athens 2008)
- Born: 28 November 1972; London, England
- Died: 5 April 2021 (aged 48)
- Education: University of St Andrews; New York University; University of East Anglia
- Occupation: Journalist
- Spouse: Kris
- Children: 2
- Relatives: Sean P. F. Hughes (father)
- Writing career
- Pen name: Lady Sarah
- Genres: Sports; International affairs; Television and entertainment
- Website: sarahhughesjournalist.com

Sarah Hughes (28 November 1972 – 5 April 2021), was a British journalist, known to her readers by the pseudonym 'Lady Sarah'. She wrote for several British national newspapers including The Telegraph, The Independent, inews, and the Observer and Guardian, in which she published regular reviews of television series including Line of Duty, Peaky Blinders, Indian Summers and the Game of Thrones.

Earlier in her career Hughes worked in the United States and wrote on basketball and college football for the New York Daily News. She subsequently published on horse racing and football. In 2004, while working for The Independent, she co-authored a report on abuses by United Nations peacekeepers in the Democratic Republic of Congo (DRC), which led to being shortlisted for an Amnesty International award, and later to an investigation of the allegations.

During the COVID-19 pandemic in the United Kingdom, Hughes wrote a series of articles for The Observer, reporting regularly on life during lockdown after being diagnosed with advanced breast cancer.

== Early life and education ==
Sarah Hughes, who was of Catholic faith, was born on 28 November 1972 in London, the daughter of Sean P. F. Hughes, an orthopaedic surgeon and his wife Felicity, a microbiologist. She was the eldest of their three children (two daughters and one son). After completing her early education in Edinburgh she sat A levels at Woldingham, Surrey, and subsequently attended St Andrews University, where she graduated MA in modern history. She then gained two further master's degrees; in journalism from New York University and in life writing from the University of East Anglia (UEA). For her dissertation on the Irish nationalist Roger Casement, she won UEA's Lorna Sage prize.

== Early career ==
Hughes began her career in journalism in the United States, initially reporting on basketball and college football for the New York Daily News. She then published on horse racing and football. Before moving on to write for British national newspapers, including The Telegraph, The Independent, The Independent on Sunday, Metro, inews, The Observer and The Guardian, she worked for the Manchester Evening News, and won their feature writer of the year award twice in a row.

In 2004, while writing for The Independent Hughes co-authored a report with photojournalist Kate Holt on abuses by United Nations peacekeepers in the Democratic Republic of Congo (DRC). It was one of several early case reports following more than 30 interviews with girls in a refugee camp in Bunia and one under the care of United Nations Children's Fund (UNICEF), and other journalists subsequently followed with further similar reports. Their work was described by Simon Cottle, professor of media and communication, as "journalism taking its responsibility to report seriously", and earned them a place on the shortlist for an Amnesty International award in that year. Their case reports included that of rape and abuse of children, and the exchange of sex-for-food. It led to an investigation of MONUC (a United Nations mission in the DRC), by the UN's Office of Internal Oversight.

== Later career ==
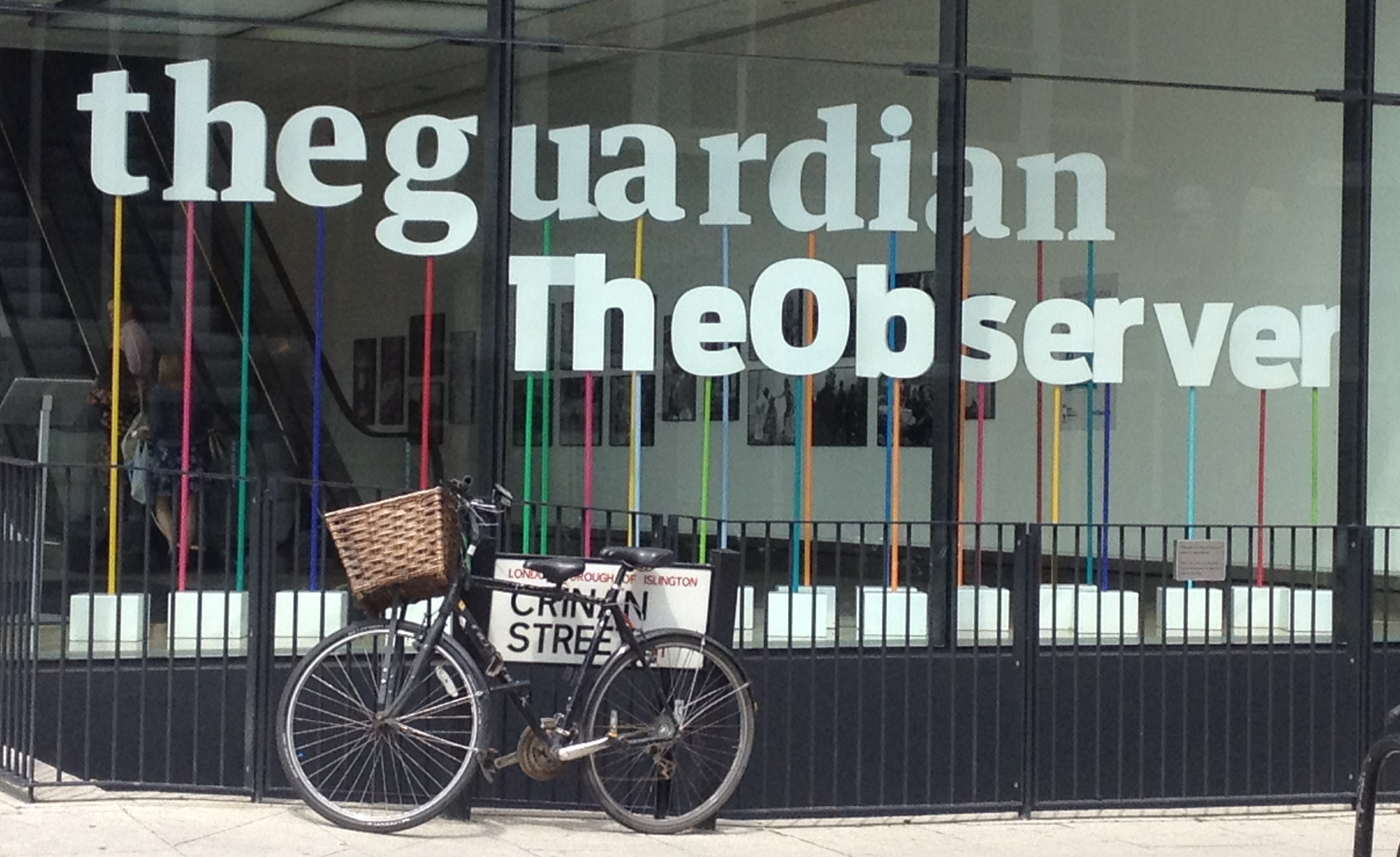
The Guardian Building, London

Hughes later specialised in journalism pertaining to television and entertainment, becoming known to her readers by the pseudonym 'Lady Sarah'. She published regular reviews on television series including Line of Duty, Peaky Blinders and Indian Summers, and contributed to The Guardian's regular blog on Game of Thrones.

Hughes also wrote several reviews of books, including The Mirror & the Light by Hilary Mantel, An American Marriage by Tayari Jones, and Deborah Orr's Motherwell: A Girlhood. In 2017, she co-authored, with her father, the Keat's Memorial Lecture, on the influence of John Keats's medical training on his poetry, delivered at the Worshipful Society of Apothecaries.

Some of her articles focused on her personal experiences, including the births of her stillborns and her diagnosis of breast cancer. In 2020, during the COVID-19 pandemic in the United Kingdom, she published a series of articles for The Observer reporting regularly on life during lockdown after being told that her breast cancer had now advanced . These included her account of March 2020, of the interruption and delay in her cancer care, and being informed that should she contract COVID-19, she would not receive an intensive care bed. Her account in November 2020, included her fear of "missing out as life ticks away, the challenges of accessing treatment, and fears about cancer research funding".

== Personal and family ==
Hughes married Kris with whom she had two children. Two of her later pregnancies had ended in stillbirths. Hughes was the best friend of the novelist Harriet Tyce.

Hughes's obituary noted that she enjoyed horse racing; Prix de l'Arc de Triomphe, Punchestown in Kildare and Cheltenham. Along with her husband she also supported the British football team Tottenham Hotspur.

== Death and legacy ==
Hughes died at home from breast cancer at the age of 48 on 5 April 2021, a day after her last article was published. Iris, one of her stillbirths, was buried with her. She is survived by her husband and two children. Her death was reported in The Guardian, in which tributes were paid by its editor-in-chief Katharine Viner, The Observer's editor Paul Webster, and writers Jed Mercurio and Sarah Phelps. A collection of her essays, Holding Tight, Letting Go, was published posthumously in 2022. It includes chapters by Tyce and Tilly Bagshawe, and ends with a note from her husband.

=== Sarah Hughes Trust Lecture and prize ===
A lecture in Hughes' memory is delivered annually at the Royal Society of Medicine (RSM). The inaugural lecture was delivered in December 2021 by Jed Mercurio, as a conversation with health and social care editor at Channel 4 News, Victoria MacDonald. The following year it was given by Marina Warner, and then Nicholas Roe in 2023. The annual event includes a prize, awarded jointly by the RSM and the Medical Journalists' Association. The first prize, in 2022, was won by BBC journalists, Rachel Schraer and Jack Goodman, for their work in revealing scientific errors that led to some people using ivermectin to treat COVID-19. The following year, the award was given to The Times reporter Helen Puttick for revealing misinformation on some NHS waiting times.

=== Lecture ===
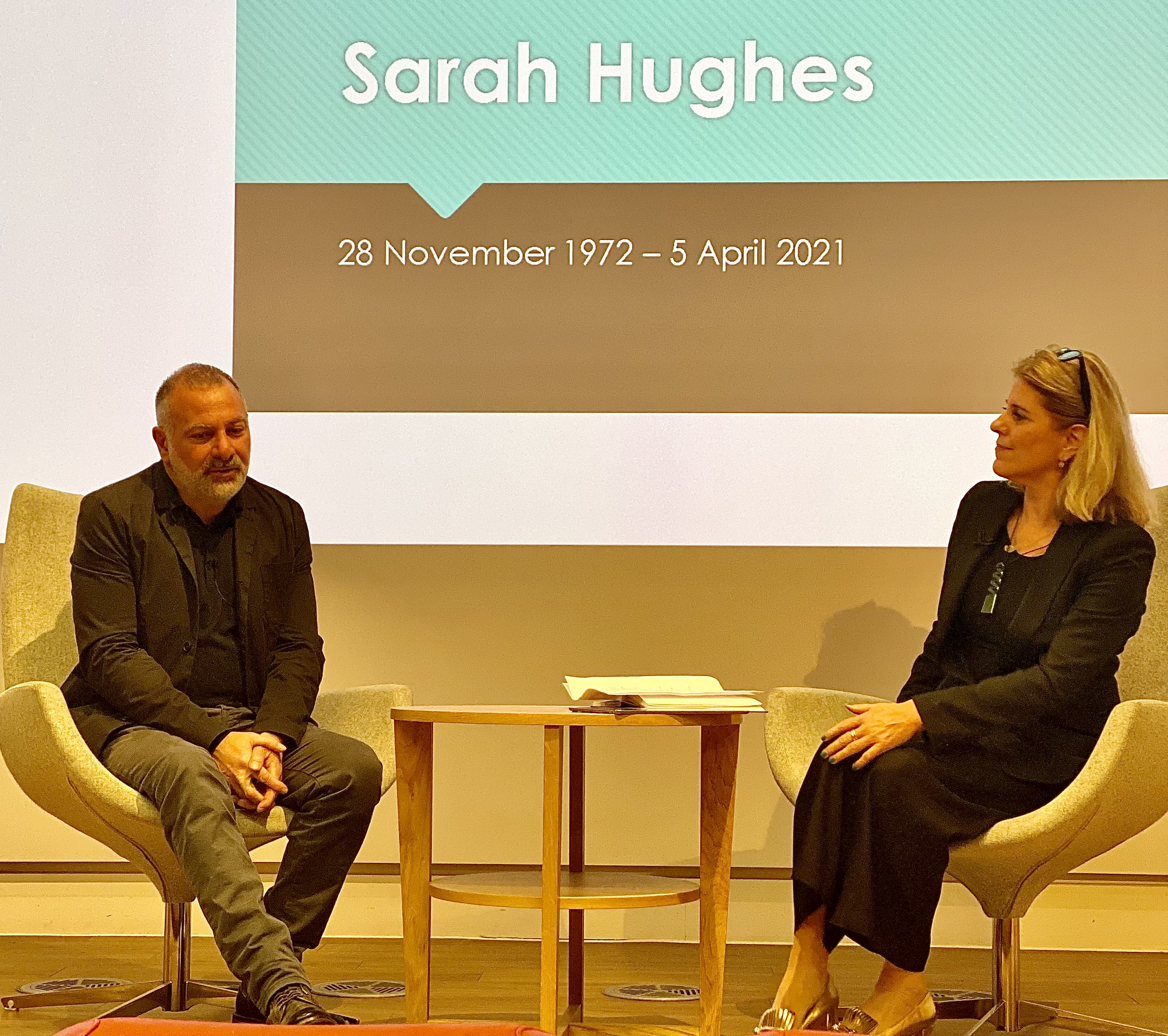
Jed Mercurio with Victoria MacDonald (2021)

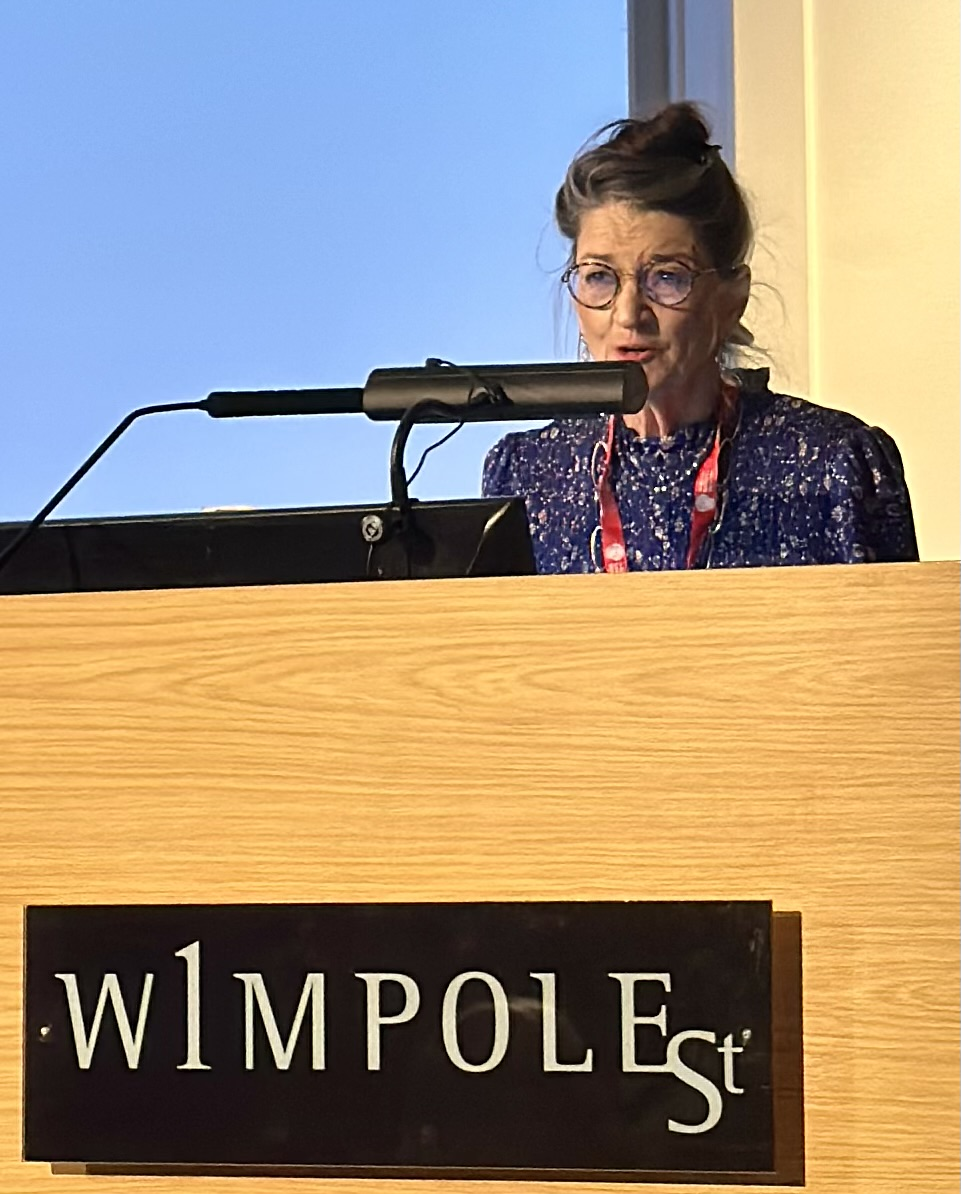
Marina Warner (2022)

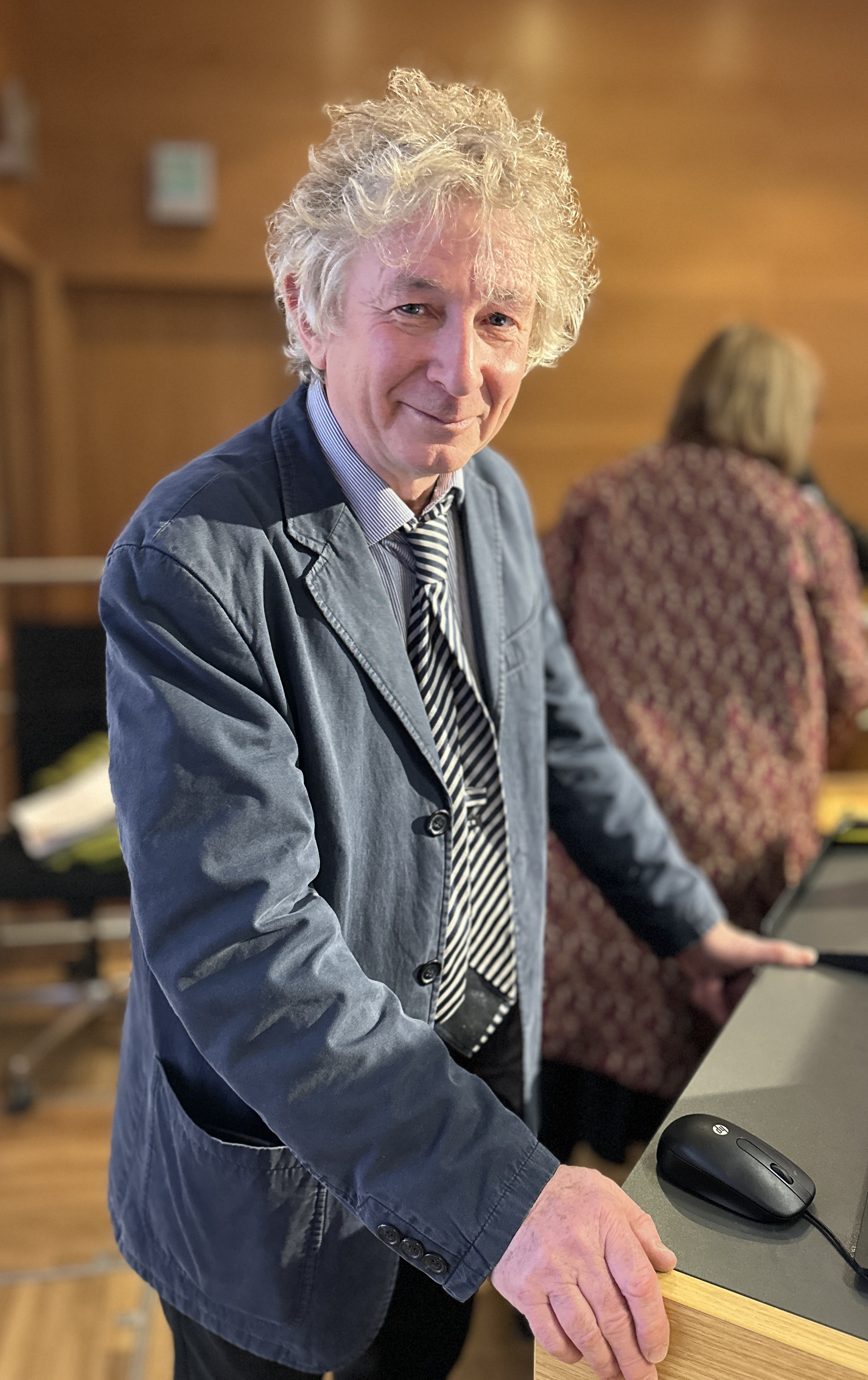
Nick Roe (2023)

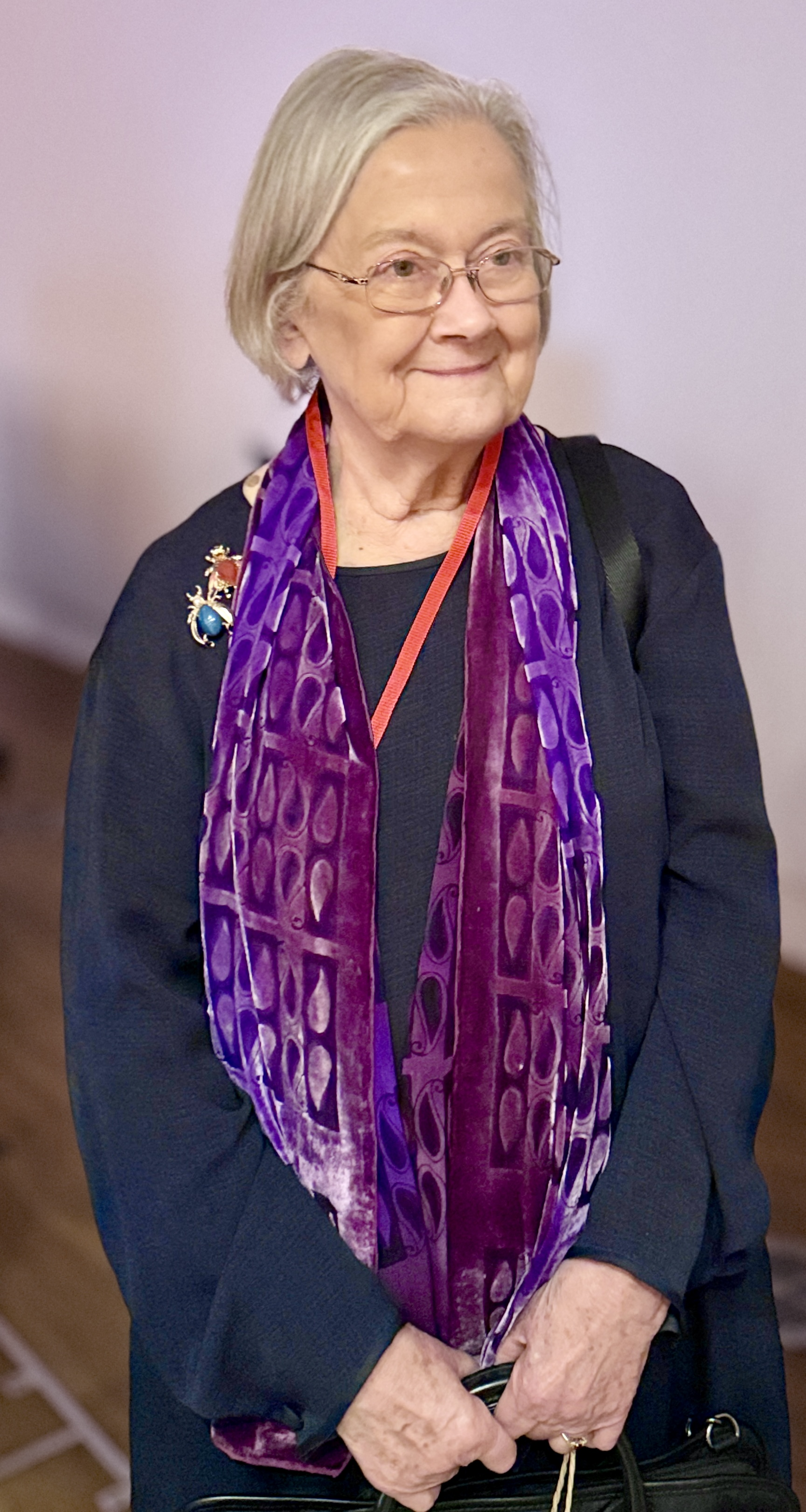
2024

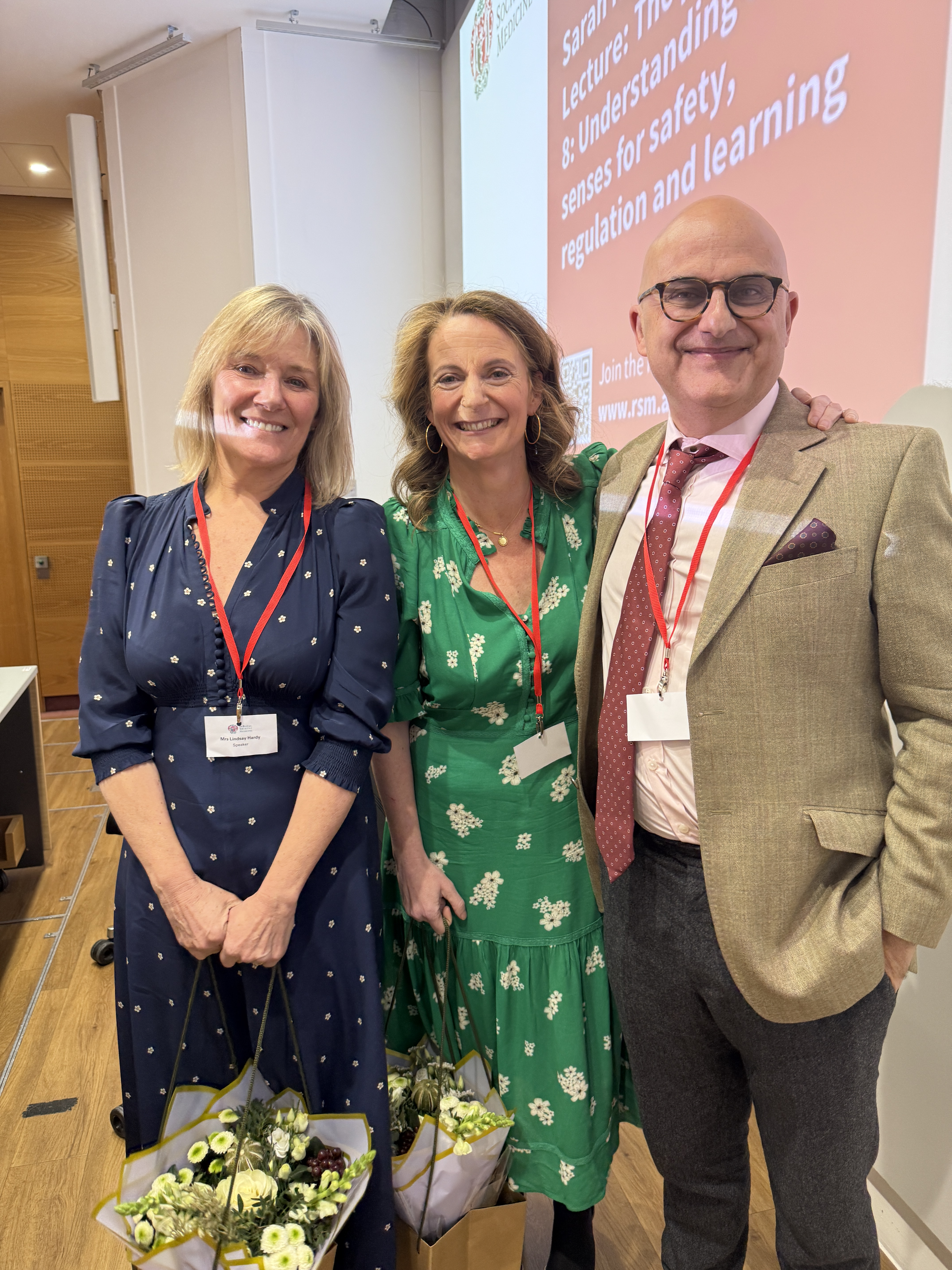
2025

=== Prize ===
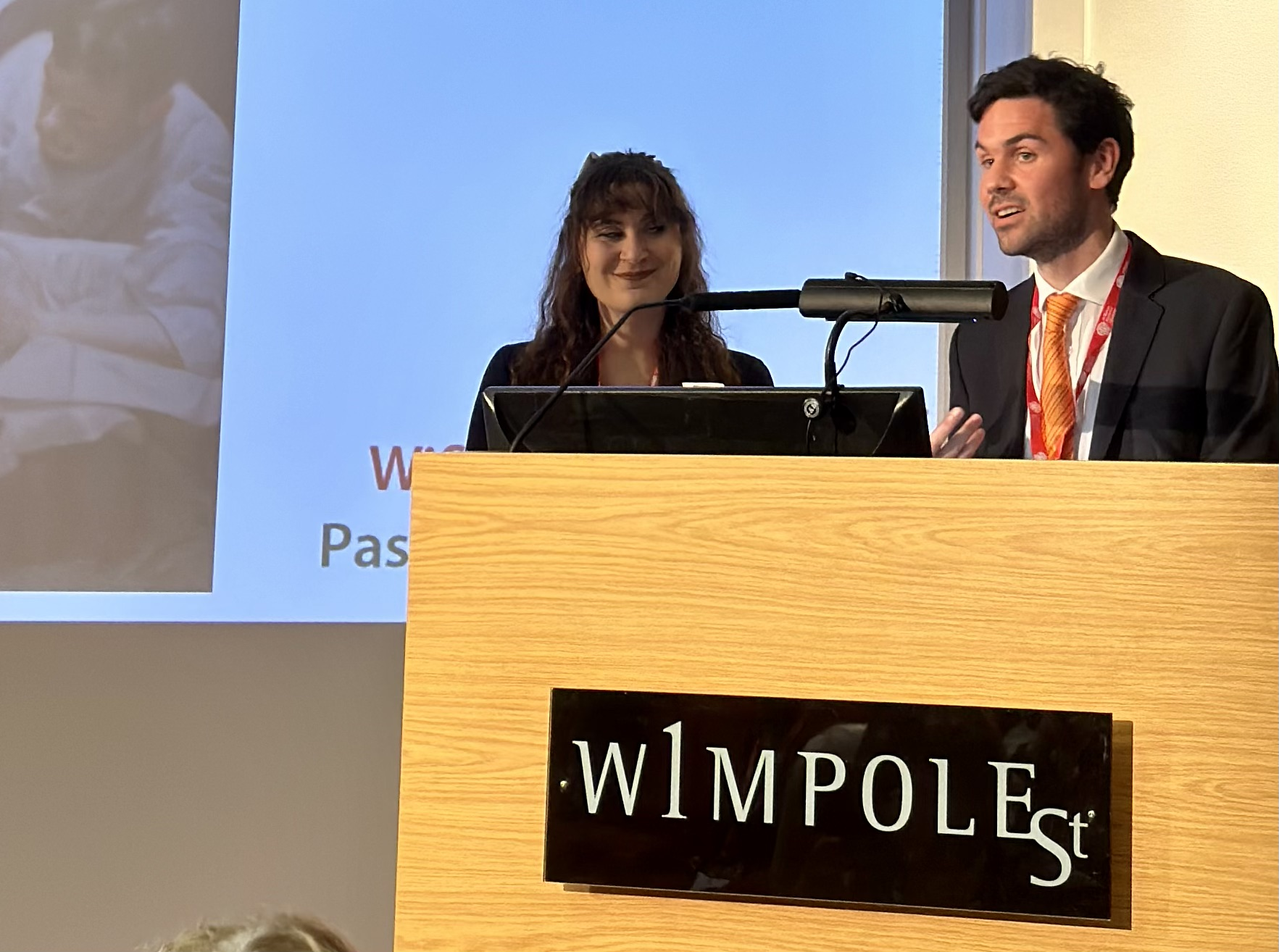
BBC: Rachel Schraer and Jack Goodman (2022)

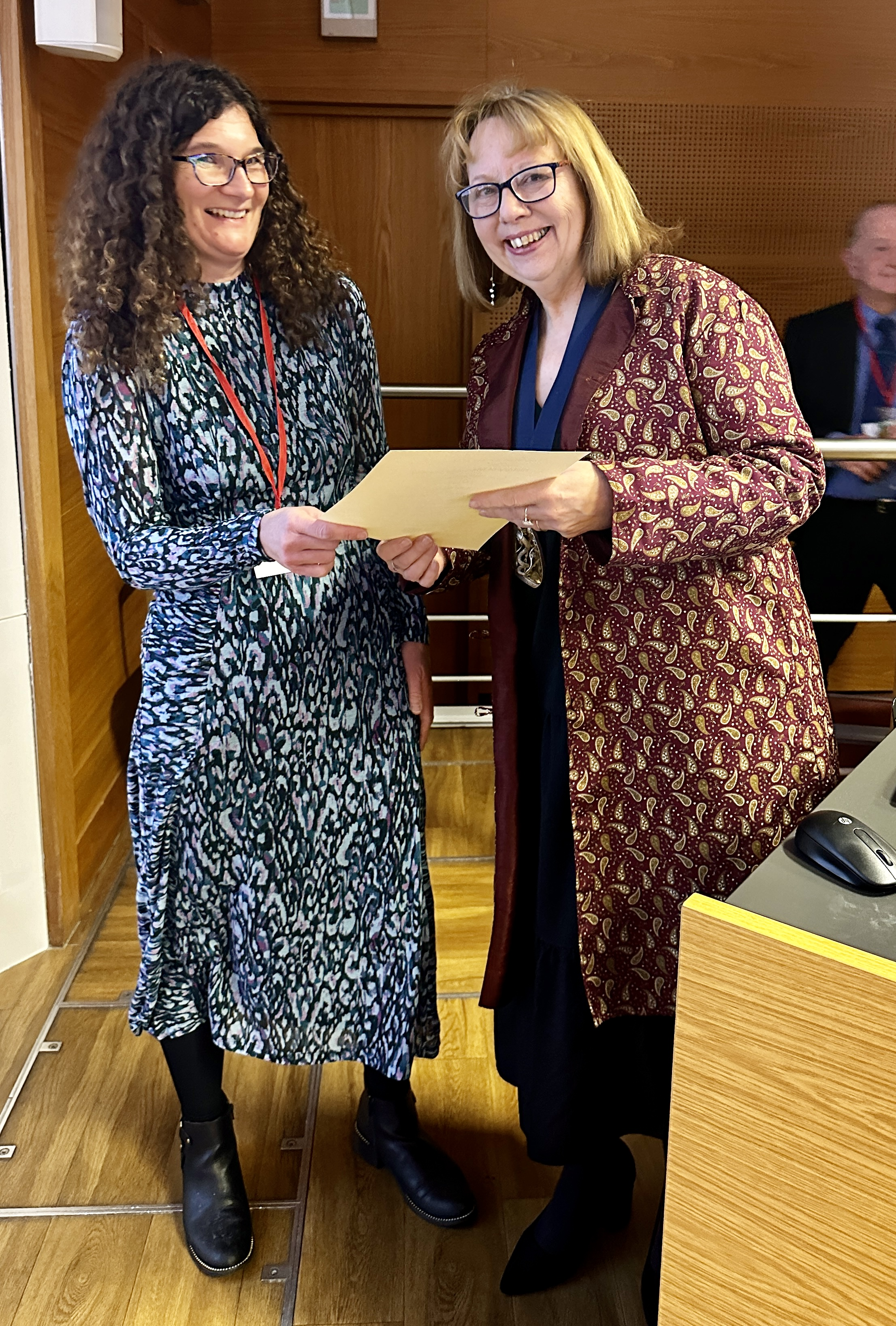
The Times: Helen Puttick with president of the History of Medicine Society Hilary Morris (2023)

== Selected publications ==
- "Sex and death in the heart of Africa". The Independent. 25 May 2004. Archived from the original on 6 April 2021. (Co-authored with Kate Holt)
- "SA troops 'raped kids in DRC'". Pretoria News. 12 July 2004. (Co-authored with Kate Holt)
- Hughes, Sean P. F.; Hughes, Sarah (2017). "Keats Memorial Lecture: How did John Keats's Medical Training Influence his Poetry?". The Keats-Shelley Review. 31 (2): 136–146. doi:10.1080/09524142.2017.1369304. S2CID 165599138. (Co-authored with S. P. F. Hughes)
- "Game of Thrones, cancer and me…". The Guardian. 7 April 2019. Archived from the original on 7 April 2021.
- "If I get the virus, the NHS can't save me. That's why isolation is a matter of life and death". The Guardian. 29 March 2020. Archived from the original on 9 April 2021.
- "'Find a part of each day to relish': coping with cancer and Covid". The Guardian. 15 November 2020. Archived from the original on 15 November 2020.
