= Bone & Joint Research =

- Discipline: Orthopaedics
- Language: English
- Edited by: Hamish Simpson

Publication details
- History: 2012-present
- Publisher: The British Editorial Society of Bone & Joint Surgery
- Frequency: Monthly
- Open access: Yes
- License: CC BY-NC 3.0
- Impact factor: 4.6 (2022)

Standard abbreviations
- ISO 4: Bone Jt. Res.

Indexing
- ISSN: 2046-3758

Links
- Journal homepage; Online Archive; Editorial Board

Bone & Joint Research (BJR) is an orthopaedic journal covering the whole spectrum of the musculoskeletal sciences, published by The British Editorial Society of Bone & Joint Surgery, a registered charity in the UK (No. 209299). BJR is a gold open access journal and hence articles published in the journal are available online to anyone, free of charge. Articles are published in a continuous publication model, and collated into monthly issues. First published in 2012, BJR is part of the Bone & Joint series of journals, which also includes Bone & Joint 360 and the flagship journal The Bone & Joint Journal (first published in 1948 as The Journal of Bone & Joint Surgery (British Volume)).

According to the Journal Citation Reports, BJR received achieved a 2022 Impact Factor Impact Factor of 4.6. The journal is also indexed in MEDLINE.
