= The Bone & Joint Journal =

- Discipline: Orthopaedics
- Language: English
- Edited by: Fares Haddad

Publication details
- Former name(s): The Journal of Bone & Joint Surgery (British Volume)
- History: 1948–present
- Publisher: The British Editorial Society of Bone & Joint Surgery
- Frequency: Monthly
- Impact factor: 4.6 (2022)

Standard abbreviations
- ISO 4: Bone Jt. J.
- NLM: Bone Joint J

Indexing
- ISSN: 2049-4394 (print); 2049-4408 (web)

Links
- Journal homepage; Current issue; Editorial board

The Bone & Joint Journal, formerly known as The Journal of Bone & Joint Surgery (British Volume), is a monthly peer-reviewed medical journal published by The British Editorial Society of Bone & Joint Surgery. It is the flagship journal within the society's 'Bone & Joint Publishing' imprint, which also includes Bone & Joint Research, Bone & Joint Open, and Bone & Joint 360.

The journal is the official publication of the British Orthopaedic Association, Canadian Orthopaedic Association, New Zealand Orthopaedic Association and Australian Orthopaedic Association.

== Abstracting and indexing ==
The journal is indexed in MEDLINE. According to the Journal Citation Reports, it has a 2022 Impact Factor of 4.6.
