= Arris and Gale Lecture =

The Arris and Gale Lecture, named for Edward Arris and John Gale, is an awarded lectureship of the Royal College of Surgeons. The first lecture was delivered by Sir William Blizard in 1810.

== Origin ==
In 1646 Edward Arris, an Alderman of the City of London, established a lecture on muscle anatomy. John Gale, a surgeon, later made a donation for a lecture (Gale anatomy lecture) on the anatomy of bones, the first of which was delivered by Clopton Havers in 1694. The two lectures were combined in 1810, to form the Arris and Gale Lecture, encompassing all human anatomy and physiology. The first lecture was delivered by Sir William Blizard in 1810.

== Lecturers ==
Year	Recipient	Lecture title	Image
1810	Sir William Blizard		
1841-1845	Bransby Blake Cooper		
1912	Edward Fawcett		
1929	Victor Negus	"On the Mechanism of the Larynx"	
1973	Paul Turner		
1942	Herbert Haxton		
1949	E. S. Hughes	"The Development of the Mammary Gland"	
1953	Herbert Haxton		
1959	R. M. McMinn	"The Cellular Anatomy of Experimental Wound Healing"	
1962	Graham Stack	"A Study of Muscle Function in the Fingers"	
1963	J. P. Martin	"The Basal Ganglia and Locomotion"	
1976	Sean P. F. Hughes	"The distribution of 99mTc-EHDP in the tissues of the dog and its application in the assessment of fracture healing", based on mineral transport in bone.	

== See also ==
- Bradshaw Lecture
- Hunterian Oration
