= Muhammad Qanoua =

Syrian actor

- Born: Muhammad Marwan Moustafa Qanoua; September 26, 1973; Damascus, Syria
- Died: April 26, 2023 (aged 49)
- Years active: 1995–2023
- Organization: Syrian Artists Syndicate
- Title: Actor

Muhammad Qanoua (September 26, 1973 – April 22, 2023) was a Syrian stage and television actor. He was the son of the late artist and radio director Marwan Qanoua. He was best known for his involvement in the comedic series Miraya, in which he acted alongside Syrian actor Yasser al-Azma in numerous episodes. He appeared in multiple Syrian television series, including Bab Al-Hara, Baqa'a Light and Kesr al-Azm. His final roles were in the series Al-Arbaji and Zoqaq al-gen, which were broadcast during Ramadan in April 2023.

== Early life ==
His grandfather was a trumpet player, and his uncles (Hashem, Omar, and Ahmad) were theater artists who worked in the Dababees Theater under the group name "Al Akhawyen Qanoua." His father, Marwan Qanoua, who served as director of the radio station. He was also one of the founding members of the Artists' Syndicate. Muhammad began his professional collaboration with his father at the radio station when he was still a fourth-grade student, a partnership that continued until 2014. He officially joined the Syrian Artists Syndicate on March 3, 1998.

His start can be considered when Yasser al-Azma selected him to participate in the Maraya series. He subsequently engaged in commercial advertising for a period of time. Over the course of his career, he presented nearly 140 series, encompassing a range of genres including drama, comedy, and tragedy. Additionally, he participated in one film, titled "Out of Coverage," released in 2007.

On June 25, 2022, the Lebanese journalist Rabaa al-Zayyat conducted an interview with Mohammed Qanoua on the program "Shaw al-Qasasa." During the course of the interview, Qanoua made a number of statements that were met with surprise by his audience. He asserted that he does not possess a considerable fortune and that he does not own a residence in Damascus or in any other location. He explained that he was determined to provide his family with a comfortable lifestyle and to ensure that his children have the opportunity to receive an excellent education. He articulated his disapproval of performing bold and indecent scenes and expressed pride in his wife and daughters' adherence to the hijab and their commitment to the customs and traditions of a conservative Eastern society. He also rejected the legitimacy of civil marriage and his daughter's marriage to a person of a different religion. He expressed staunch opposition to the promotion of homosexuality and lesbianism.

His daughter, Masa, began her acting career at a young age, appearing alongside him in numerous series, most notably Girls of the Family. As she matured, she opted to emulate her mother's example by donning the hijab and retiring from the acting profession. Mohammed Qanoua asserted that the practice of wearing the hijab and pursuing a career in acting are incompatible, and expressed his hope that his daughter would instead embark on a career in directing.

== Personal life ==
He married a woman from outside the artistic community, with whom he had four children: Adnan, Marwan, Maya, and Masa.

=== Death ===
Qanoua died of a sudden myocardial infarction on April 22, 2023, at the age of 49. Local media sources indicated that he died following a cardiac catheterization procedure. His funeral was conducted at Dar al-Shifa Hospital in Damascus, and his remains were interred at Mezzeh Cemetery.

The Syrian Artists Syndicate issued a statement on its Facebook page mourning the death of Muhammad Qanoua: "The Syndicate of Artists in the Syrian Arab Republic extends its deepest sympathies to the family, colleagues, and loved ones of the late Muhammad Qanoua. May the soul of our departed colleague rest in peace, and may we find solace and strength in this difficult time."

== Acting biography ==
=== Theater ===
- He has been involved in every theatrical production at Pins Theater.
- In 2018, he participated in the Bread Trail Theater with the Joy Choir.

=== Cinema ===
- Khareg Al-Taghtya 2007

=== Series ===
Year	Series
1994	Qadya A'alya
1995–1996	Maraya
1995	Khalf Al-Godran
1996	Modeer Be Al-Sodfa
1998–1999	Maraya
1998	Safar
1999	Mazad A'alany
1999	Ahl W Habaib
2000	Sebaq Ll Zawag
2000	Hakaya
2001	Maqamat Badea'a Al Zaman Al-Hamzany
2001	La Shou Al hakey
2001	Maraya
2002	Hadieth Al-Maraya
2002	Boqa'at Doa' - Part 2
2002	Al-Safina Rehla 13
2003	Abou Al-Mafhomya
2003	Al-Yasmine W Al-Asmant
2003	Qanoun W Lakn
2003	Ayamna Al-Helwa
2004	Lialy Al-Salheya
2004	A'asr Al Genoun
2004	Hekayet Khareef
2004	Boqa'at Doa' - Part 4
2004	Al-Khayt Al-Abyad
2005	Al-Ghadr
2005	Khafya
2005	Hadieth AlMaraya
2005	Khamsa W Khmesa
2006–2010	Bab Al-Hara
2006	Ghezlan Fe Ghabet Al-Zea'b
2006	W Sha' Al Hawa
2006	Maraya
2006	Asyad Al-Mal
2007	A'ala Hafet Al-Hawya
2007	Seret Al-Hob
2008	Awlad Al-Qymarya
2008	Bayt Gady
2008	Youm Momter A'kher
2008	Malameh Bashar
2008	Gamal Al-Rouh
2009	Al-Hasram Al-Shamy
2009	Zaman Al-A'ar
2009	Al-Sham Al-Eidya
2009	Sahabet Sayf
2009	Haya Okhra
2009	Qoloub Saghera
2009	Zelzal
2009	Shetaa Sakhen
2009	Ibn Al-Arandaly
2010	Asa'ad Al-Waraq
2010	Ahl Al-Raya
2010	Sa'at Al Sefr
2010	Al-Dabour
2010	Al-Qea'aqa'a Bin Amr Al-Tamemy
2010	Takht Sharqy
2010	Al-Sandouq Al-Aswad
2010	Abou Ganty
2010	Abou Al-Khalil Al-Qabany
2010	Sbaya
2011	Ayam Al-Derasa
2011	Maraya
2011	Al-Welada Mn Al-Khaserah
2011	Malh Al-Haya
2011	Fe Hadert Al-Ghyab
2011	Al-A'eshiq Al-Haram
2011	Saya'aeen Daya'aeen
2011	Moghamarat Dalila W Al-Zaybaq
2012	Romantica
2012	Ayam Al-Derasa
2012	Al-Amemy
2012	Set Kaz
2012	Al-Moftah
2012	Arwah A'arya
2012	Banat Al-Eela
2012	Mokhtar Haretna
2012	Tahoun Al-Shar
2013	Maraya
2014	Khawatem
2014	Boqa'et Doa'
2014–2015	Bab Al-Hara
2015	Haret Al-Masharqa
2015	B Entezar Al-Yasmine
2015	Shahr Zaman
2015	A'anaya Moshadada
2015	Donia
2016–2017	Bab Al-Hara
2016	Moznebon A'brya'
2016	Shouq
2016	Ayam La Tounsa
2016	Faouda
2018	Ra'ehat Al-Rouh
2018	Al-Molheb Ben Abi Safra
2019	Bab Al-Hara
2019	Double Face
2019	Haramlek
2021	A'ala Safeh Sakhen
2021	Al-Snawnaw
2021	Haret Al-Qouba
2022	A'ala Qayd Al-Hob
2022	Hawazeeq
2022	Kasr A'adm
2022	Ma'a Waqf Al-Tanfeez
2023	Laylat Al Sqout
2023	Al-A'arbagy
2023	Zoqaq Al-Gen - Al-Karakon
