= Dina Haroun =

Syrian actress

Dina Haroun دينا هارون
- Born: December 24, 1973; Latakia, Syria
- Died: October 8, 2018 (aged 44); Damascus, Syria
- Occupation: Actress
- Years active: 1999–2018
- Spouse(s): Khaldoun Walid (m. 2010; div. 2015) (m. 2018)
- Children: 1
- Relatives: Tulai Haroun (sister)

Dina Haroun (Arabic: دينا هارون; born 24 December 1973 – 8 October 2018) was a Syrian TV actress.

== Career ==
Haroun started her acting career in Yasser al-Azma's hugely-successful series Maraya in 2000. In 2011, she left the cast of an Egyptian series, Al Hareba, due to a disagreement with the production company, and announced she was to play a lead in a new series, Ayam El Derasa, in which she plays a teacher that ends up having a student who falls in love with her.

== Personal life ==
Haroun married businessman Khaldoun Walid in December 2010. They had their only son, Karam, in April 2015, but divorced later that same year. The couple remarried in early 2018. Her sister, Tulai Haroun, is also an actress.

== Death ==
In 2017, Haroun suffered a sudden stroke and was hospitalized for treatment, followed by two months of rest and recovery.

On October 8, 2018, she died at Al-Asad University Hospital in Damascus. However, conflicting reports emerged regarding the cause of her death. According to the Syrian Arab News Agency (SANA), she experienced a health issue and was taken to Al-Asad University Hospital, where she underwent a successful appendectomy. Though she was discharged from intensive care, she was readmitted due to severe lung infections that caused breathing difficulties. Other sources, however, suggest that she had been suffering from advanced stomach cancer.

A medical source indicated that the fatal mistake was performing surgery without fully considering her health condition. Already weakened by infections and other ailments, Haroun developed severe blood infections during the operation, which caused her organ systems to fail. Within hours, her condition worsened, leading to an 80% shutdown of her body’s systems. Despite brief signs of improvement, her health continued to decline until her death was confirmed.

== Filmography ==
- Ayam El Derasa
- Al Hareba
- Nisaa Min Al Badyah
- Maraya
- Saqf al-Alam
