= Iyad Rimawi =

Syrian-Palestinian music composer, songwriter, and producer

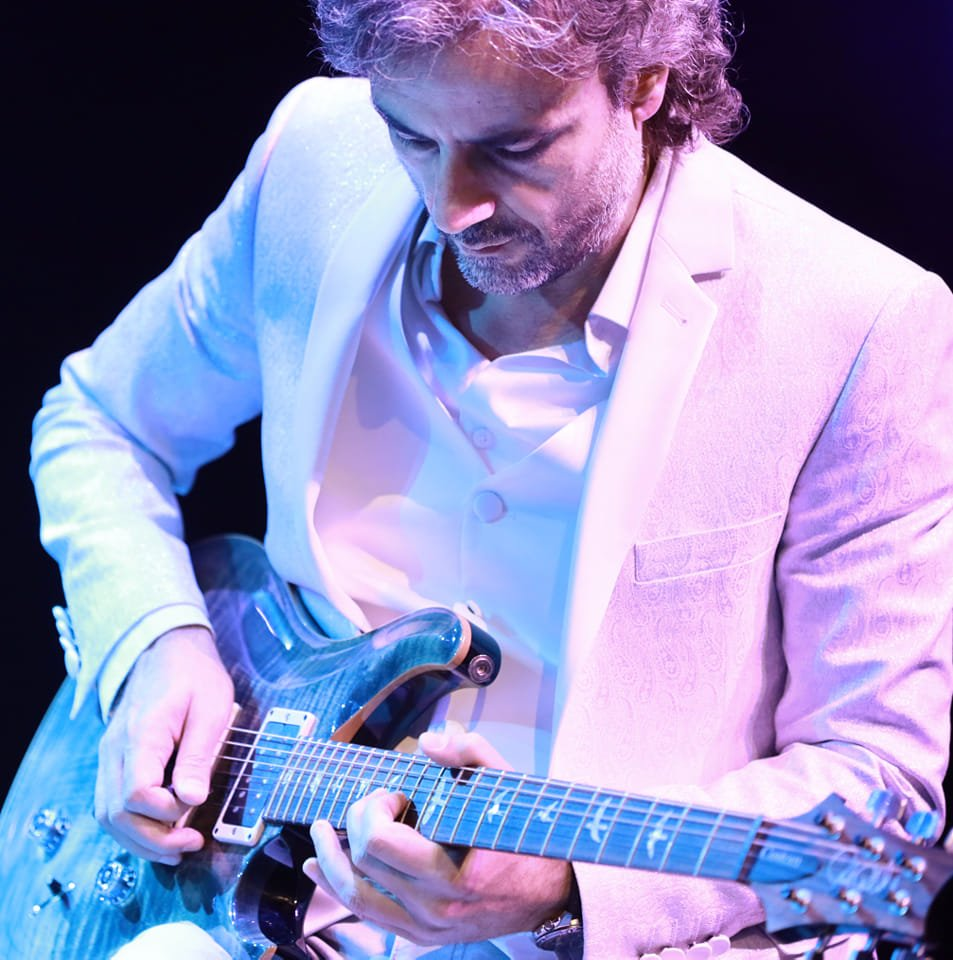

Background information
- Born: Iyad Rimawi; 22 January 1973 (age 53); Damascus, Syria
- Genres: Instrumental, oriental, indie folk, film scores
- Occupations: Composer, songwriter, producer
- Instruments: Guitar, bass guitar, Oud, keyboards
- Years active: 1995–present
- Website: www.iyadrimawi.com

Iyad Rimawi (Arabic: أياد ريماوي; born 22 January 1973), is a Syrian music composer, songwriter, and producer. He is best known for his soundtracks for several TV series such as Moawia, Nadam and Godfather.

== Early life and career ==
Rimawi was born and raised in Damascus, Syria and graduated from the Faculty of Mechanical Engineering of Damascus University. He began playing guitar at the age of 12 and at the age of 14, he began composing his own music. While studying, he has formed more than one band which played folk, pop, rock and oriental genres.

=== Kulna Sawa Band (1995 - 2009) ===
In 1995, Rimawi co-founded the pioneering Syrian band “Kulna Sawa” with five other members. A Damascus-based band that signed a recording agreement in 2000 with EMI music, Kulna Sawa has toured and performed many concerts in Damascus, Aleppo, Amman, Beirut, Dubai, Kuwait, Morocco and in 20 US states during the Culture for Peace project, where the band won a Peace Prize in 2005 from the United Nations. Iyad wrote most of the songs and he was the main producer for the band albums Kulna Sawa Radio Station 2009, Musaique 2004, Shi Jdeed “New Stuff” 1999 and "Safinet Noh “Noah's arc” 1998.

=== Rimawi Studio (2001 - Present) ===
In 2001, Rimawi founded his recording Studio where he composes and produces Soundtrack for numerous Syrian and Arabian TV series. In 2012, Rimawi signed with Sony Music Middle East as the first Arab artist to sign a recording contract with Sony Music. His first album, Tales from Damascus was released in 2012, a compilation of his selected songs, the album took second place in Virgin megastores Middle East chart. In 2016, Rimawi released his second album, Silence in Syria which reached first place in Virgin megastores Middle East chart and remained for 3 months. In 2018, he released his third solo album, Damascus Now, the album was produced in a time of hardship and war in Syria which has been reflected in his music.

In 2021, he also released Sailing Nowhere (EP), followed by Rouge Soundtrack in 2022, a project reflecting his growing interest in cinematic and narrative-driven compositions.

=== Tours & Concerts ===
Iyad began touring outside of Syria in 2004 with his band Kulna Sawa, visiting Prince George's County, Maryland as part of a cultural friendship tour. In 2017, Rimawi toured three major Syrian cities, Damascus, Aleppo and Latakia. In 2018, he became the first Arab musician to perform at Dubai World Trade Centre Arena, the largest indoor venue in the Middle East. The concert was titled as “Love Letters from Damascus 2018”. He then came back to Dubai with "Love Letters from Damascus 2021" which was for two days and performed at the Dubai Opera. In 2022, Rimawi premiered his composition The Syrian Rhapsody at Expo 2020 Dubai in what became the biggest musical performance of the Expo, held at Jubail Theatre, followed by One Night at Dubai Opera, further strengthening his standing as one of the region’s leading orchestral performers.

Rimawi’s international reach expanded in 2024, when he headlined One Night in Berlin Philharmonie performing at Germany’s most prestigious concert hall, home of the world-renowned Berlin Philharmonic Orchestra. and One Night in Utrecht at TivoliVredenburg in the Netherlands. In 2025, he performed at Al Majaz Amphitheatre in Sharjah one of the Gulf’s most iconic open-air cultural venues, and later returned to Dubai’s Zabeel Theatre for the concert Back to Live. In the same year, Rimawi was invited to perform at The Golden Pen Award ceremony in Riyadh, Saudi Arabia, an event honouring creative excellence across the Arab world. He also brought his special One Night in London performance to the Barbican Theatre in September 2025

In 2026, Rimawi performed at Princess Nourah University’s Red Theater in Riyadh, followed by concerts at Dubai’s Zabeel Theatre on 6 February and Abu Dhabi’s Cultural Foundation on 7 February.

Rimawi’s music continues to be defined by its seamless fusion of traditional oriental melodies with Western classical orchestration. Through his compositions and live performances, he has remained a prominent figure in contemporary Arabic music, blending heritage with modernity to reach a global audience.

== Discography ==
=== Kulna Sawa Band ===
- 1998 – Safinet Noh (Noah's Arc)
- 1999 – Shi Jdeed (New Stuff)
- 2004 – Musaique
- 2009 – Kulna sawa Radio Station

=== Soundtrack ===
- 2003 – Saif Bin Thee Yazan – directed by Maamoun Al Bunni
- 2006 – Maraya – directed by Hisham Sharbatji
- 2007 – Jrn Alshaweesh – directed by Hisham Sharbatji
- 2009 – Men Wanted – directed by Samer Barqawi, Hatem Ali
- 2010 – After The Fall – directed by Samer Barqawi
- 2011 – Al Ghofran (Forgiveness) – directed by Hatem Ali
- 2012 – Hawameer al sahraa – directed by Samer Barqawi
- 2013 – Death Game – directed by Al Laith Hajo and Samer Barqawi
- 2013 – Revealing silence – directed by Basem Shabo
- 2014 – Lau (If Only) – directed by Samer Barqawi
- 2014 – Debbo Alshanatee (Pack The Bags) – directed by Laith Hajo
- 2014 – Alam homra (Rouge) – directed by Hatem Ali
- 2015 – Godfather (Orient Club) – directed by Hatem Ali
- 2015 – Cello – directed by Samer Barqawi
- 2015 – 24 Carat – directed by Al Laith Hajo
- 2016 – Samra – directed by Rasha Sharbatji
- 2016 – Ya Ret – directed by Philip Asmar
- 2016 – Nadam (Regret) – directed by Al Laith Hajo
- 2017 – Orkidia – directed by Hatem Ali
- 2017 – Shaowk (Missing) – directed by Rasha Sharbatji
- 2018 – Shababik (Windows) – directed by Samer Barqawi
- 2018 – Farmers Revolution – directed by Philip Asmar
- 2019 – Ma Fiyi –directed by Rasha Sharbatji
- 2019 – Masafet Aman – directed by Al Laith Hajo
- 2019 – Haramlek – directed by Tamer Ishak
- 2019 – Souq Aldemaa - directed by Al Laith Hajo
- 2020 – Awlad Adam – directed by Al Laith Hajo
- 2020 – Min Al Akher – directed by Charles Chlela
- 2020 – Souq Al Harir – directed by Moumen Almalla
- 2021 – Kharze Zarka – directed by Julian Maalouf
- 2022 – Aleayn Bialeayn – directed by Randa Alam
- 2022 – Beirut 303 – directed by Elie Semaan
- 2023 - Al Kha'en – directed by Mike Bartlett
- 2025 - Moawia - directed by Ahmed Medhat

=== Albums ===
- 2011 – Forgiveness Soundtrack
- 2012 – Tales from Damascus
- 2015 – Godfather Soundtrack
- 2016 – Silence in Syria
- 2018 – Damascus Now
- 2021 – Sailing Nowhere EP
- 2022 – Rouge Soundtrack
- 2023 – The Syrian Rhapsody (Live)
- 2024 – Live At Hijaz Station
- 2025 – Souq Al-Harir Soundtrack

== Live Concerts ==
- 2015 – Damascus Opera House Concert, Damascus, Syria
- 2017 – Syria Tour, Damascus, Aleppo and Latakia, Syria
- 2018 – Love Letters from Damascus. Dubai, UAE
- 2021 – Love Letters from Damascus. Dubai Opera, UAE
- 2021 – Nights at Dubai Expo 2020. Dubai, UAE
- 2022 – The Syrian Rhapsody. Expo 2020 Dubai
- 2022 – One Night at Dubai Opera. Dubai, UAE
- 2024 – One Night in Berlin Philharmonie. Berlin, Germany
- 2024 – One Night in Utrecht at TivoliVredenburg. Utrecht, Netherlands
- 2025 – Live at Al Majaz Amphitheatre. Sharjah UAE
- 2025 – Back To Live at Zabeel Theatre. Dubai, UAE
- 2025 – The Golden Pen Award. Riyadh, Saudi Arabia
- 2025 – One Night in London Barbican. London, UK
- 2026 – Love Letters from Damascus at Princess Nourah University. Riyadh, Saudi Arabia
- 2026 – Live at Zabeel Theatre. Dubai, UAE
- 2026 – Live at Cultural Foundation Theatre. Abu Dhabi, UAE
