= Wael Sharaf =

Syrian actor and director (born 1977)

- Born: Wael Subhi Al-Rifai; July 15, 1977 (age 48); Syria
- Occupations: Actor, Director, Lecturer
- Years active: 2001–
- Known for: The Arabic Johnny Depp, Ageed Moataz, Abo Jud, Abo Al-Ezz
- Partner: Khuloud Sawa
- Children: 2
- Website: waelsharaf.com

Wael Sharaf (Arabic: وائل شرف; born 15 July 1977) is a Syrian actor and film director. He is known for playing Moataz in the historical drama Bab al-Hara seasons 1-7, which is shown during Ramadan.

== Early life ==
Wael Sharaf's real name is Wael Subhi Al-Rifai. He is the son of Syrian actor Subhi Al-Rifai. Wael is popular among a large segment of the Syrian population. He graduated from the Higher Institute of Dramatic Arts in Damascus in 2001 and participated in TV shows on Arab Syrian TV. He debuted in Al-Mutanabbi in 2001. He studied medicine in Ukraine, but it did not suit him. He then switched to acting. Sharaf, also called "the Arabic Johnny Depp", gained a large audience after his performance of Moataz in Bab al-Hara, which appeared across the Arab world.

== Bab Al-Hara ==
Bab Al-Hara premiered in 2006 and is one of the most popular television series in the Arab world. Sharaf appeared throughout the series, and his role in season 4 expanded. Wael Sharaf played Moataz, the son of pharmacist Abu Issam. He left the series after season 7.

In an interview with CNN Arabic, director Bassam Al-Mulla stated that Sharaf was studying in London and that he demanded a higher wage. Bassem also stated that Wael ignored the favors the series bestowed on him. The next week Wael responded, stressing that without him the character would not have achieved the success it experienced.

== Death rumor ==
In 2012, there were rumors that Wael Sharaf had fled towards Turkey and was killed in an air raid. Sharaf laid the rumors to rest by making a public statement that he was alive and still in Syria.

== Television ==
Year	Title	Role	Notes
2001	Al-Muttanabi		
2003	Maraya		Only 1 Episode
2003	Boqaa Dhaou 3		Season 3
2003	Dhikrayat Al-Zaman Al Kadem		
2003	Ana wa Aammati Amina	Hatem	
2003	Al-Houjaj		
2003	Is'al Rouhak		
2003	Hakayat Al-lail wa Al-nahar		Episode: "Qays wa Layla"
2004	AlKhayt Al-abyadh	Jamal	
2004	Fatel Al-rabie	Ashraf	
2004	Layali Al-Salhiya	Abd Al-Hay	
2004	Rejaha	Aaref	
2005	Al-shams Tashruq Men Jadid	Riyadh	
2006	Al-Qadhiya 6008	Nadim	
2006	Ahl Algharam		
2006	Weshaa Alhawa	Andre	
2006–2015	Bab Al-Hara	Moataz	Season 1, 2, 3, 4, 5, 6, 7
2007	Aaqal Almajanin		
2007	Aljamar wa Aljamar		
2007	Antar Ibn Shaddad	Hounayfa Ibn Badr	
2007	Sirat Alhoub	Different roles: Alladin in Alladin and the Magic Lompe, Tamim in Sukkar Makr, Ammar in Mabas Tama Ghayrama	
2007	Koum Alhajar	Ahmed	
2008	Lays Saraba	Aamer	
2008	Beit Jeddi	Aajaj	Season 1
2009	Qalbi Maakoum	Fouad	
2010	Laanat Altin	Jawad	
2010	Baad Alsoqout	Majeed	
2011–2012	Dalila wa Zaybaq	Ali Al-Zaybaq	Season 1 and 2
2012	Tahoun Al-shar	Zidou	
2014	El-hob Kolah	Nasr Al-Deen	Episodes (5) of Nasr
2018	Hawa Al-roh	Ibrahim	

=== Dubbing roles ===
- Monster Rancher (TV series) as Datonares *In the name of Wael Al-Rifai
- Hunter × Hunter (1999) as Phinks Magcub (episodes 58–61), Geretta, Agon, Gotoh, Riehlvelt, Melody, Owl, Assassin E, Leorio (episodes 63–70) *In the name of Wael Al-Rifai
- Wish Kid *In the name of Wael Al-Rifai
- VS Knight Ramune & 40 Fire as Mito Natto *In the name of Wael Al-Rifai
- GeGeGe no Kitarō (2007 film) as Kitarō
