= Azma family =

Azma (Arabic: العظّمة (ʕazama)) is a surname of Arabic origin.

The Al-Azma family is a well-established Damascene family founded by Hasan Bey Al-Azma, who died (1040 AH / 1630 AD) when he came from Konya to Damascus and settled in the Al-Midan district and served as a commander of the local Yerli Janissary forces in Damascus. Over the centuries, the family became deeply integrated into Damascene society. One of the family's ancestors played a pivotal role in leading a popular uprising against the oppression of a Turkish governor, part of a broader conflict between the Yerli Janissaries and the foreign Qapiqoli forces. Despite the rebellion's suppression and subsequent marginalization, the family eventually regained prominence, establishing itself as an influential force in Syria's political and social landscape.

The historian Khayr al-Din al-Zirikli described the Azama family as follows: "The Azama family is one of the well-known families in Syria. They settled in Damascus in the early 11th century AH and produced distinguished officers, administrators, and scholars." (Encyclopedia of Notable Figures, vol. 8, p. 214.)This family has produced many personalities in various fields, including:

- Aziz al-Azmeh (born 1947), Syrian historian
- Bashir al-Azma (1910–1992), Syrian doctor and politician
- Mehran Azma, known as R. Barrows, American musician
- Nabih al-Azma (1886–1964), Syrian politician
- Kinan Azmeh (born 1976), Syrian musician
- Yasser al-Azma (born 1942), Syrian writer and actor
- Yusuf al-Azma (1883–1920), Syrian politician

The origins of the family are disputed. Most accounts suggest Turkish roots, due to their ancestor's prolonged residence in Konya. However, the family's genealogists claim Arab lineage, which is the more likely and officially adopted position by the family itself. Their founder, Hasan, was known by the title "Al-Azma" before the people of Damascus nicknamed him "Turkman." The head of the family has written an extensive article explaining that the family is part of the "Al-Uzama" clan in Jordan, which descends from the Subaihat tribe of Bani Khalid. Genetic analysis shows the family belongs to the rare mutation J-ZS5973, which falls under the major J1-P58 branch shared by most Semitic peoples. This indicates an Arab origin and a presence in the Levant for thousands of years.

== See also ==
Al-Azm family
