= Lilia al-Atrash =

Syrian actress

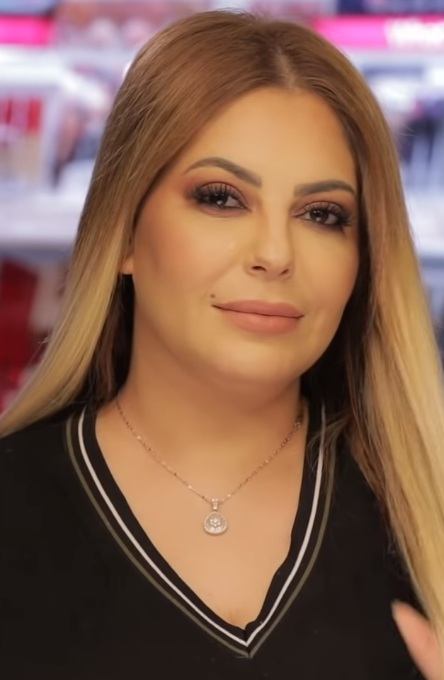
- Lilia al-Atrash, May 2019
- Born: 18 August 1981 (age 44); As-Suwayda, Syria
- Occupation: Actress

Lilia al-Atrash (Arabic: ليليا الأطرش; born 18 August 1981) is a Syrian Druze television actress. She started her career with the famous actor and writer Yasser al-Azma in the sitcom Maraya.
