= Abbas al-Noury =

Syrian actor (born 1952)

Abbas Al-Noury عباس النوري
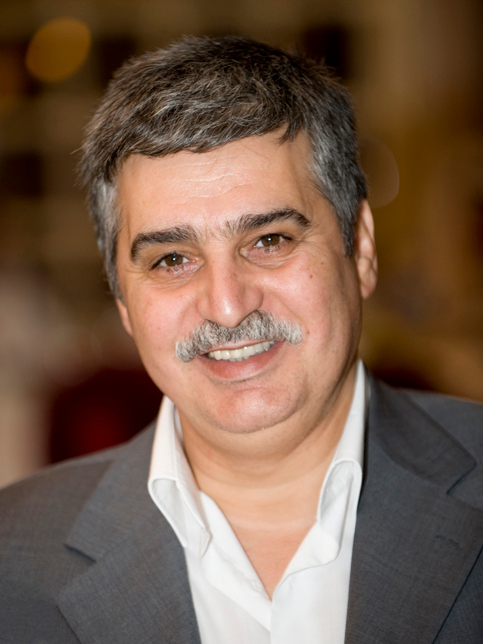
- Born: 8 December 1952 (age 73); Damascus, Second Syrian Republic
- Occupation: Actor
- Years active: 1979–present
- Spouse: Aa'nud Khaled (m. 1989)
- Children: 3

Abbas al-Noury (Arabic: عباس النوري; born 8 December 1952 in Damascus, Syria) is a prominent Syrian television actor, writer, and director known for his role in the Syrian series Bab al-Hara, and for being the leading Syrian actor of "Al Ijtiah" (The Invasion) TV series about the atrocities in Jenin camp in Palestine. This series was the first Arabic TV production to win the Emmy’s new telenovela category for the best international drama series in 2008.

== Career ==
Al-Nouri started his acting career at a very young age. His first professional role was at Damascus University's theater. After studying history at Damascus University, he took some small roles in the growing Syrian drama industry and also played vocal roles in many popular Damascus Radio series. His background and interest in history made him one of the most prominent actors, critics and directors of historical TV series.

== Personal life ==
He is married to Aa'nud Khaled, a TV series writer, since 1989. They have two boys and a girl.

== Acting works ==
- Bayader (Wheat Fields) (1976)
- Al-Waseef (The Broker) (1978)
- Tayer Al-Ayyau Al-Ajeebah (1980)
- Al-Ajniha (The Wings) (1984)
- Al-Tabiba (The Doctor) (1985)
- Alhijra Ela Al-Watan (Migration to the Homeland) (1987)
- Lik Ya Sham (For you Damascus) (1988)
- Hijrat Al-Qoloub Ela Al-Qoloub (1990)
- Abu Kamel - Part1 (1990)
- Al-Khishkhash (Poppy) (1991)
- Ayyam Shamieh (Damascene Days) (1992)
- Al-Doghri (1992)
- Abu Kamel - Part2 (1993)
- Abna Wa Umahat (Sons and Mothers) (1994)
- Hammam al-Quishani - Part 2 (1995)
- Hammam al-Quishani - Part 3 (1996)
- Kunna Assdiqa'a (We Were Friends) (1996)
- Ash-Shatat (The Diaspora) (2003)
- Layali al-Salehiyah (Alsalehiyah Nights) (2004)
- Bab Al-Hara (Neighborhood Gate) (2006)
- Bab Al-Hara (Neighborhood Gate)- Part 2 (2007) where he partly participated in writing, editing and directing
- Mamaraat Dayiqah (2007)
- Al-Ijtiyaah (The Conquest) (2007) (Emmy Award winner)
- Awlad Kimraya (Sons of Alqaimarieh)(2008) A two parts successful series written by his spouse
- Al Hussrum Al Sahammi (Damassene Green Grapes) Parts 1, 2 and 3 (between 2007 and 2009)
- Laysa Saraaba (It's Not Mirage) (2008) Best series of the year
- Sheta'a Sakhen (Hot Winter) (2009)
- Qalbi Maakom (My heart is with you) (2009)
- Ahl Alrayah - Part2 (The Standard Bearers) (2010)
- Al Khubz Al Haram (Forbidden Bread) (2010)
- Suqout Al Khilafah (The fall of the Caliphate) (2010)
- Taab El Meshwar (2011)
- Talea Al Fiddah (2011)
- Al Ishq Al Haram (Forbidden Love) (2011)
- Alammeme (2012)
- Sukar Wasat (2013)
- Al Girbal (2014)
- Bab Al Hara - Part (6) (2014)
- Bab Al Hara - Part (7) (2015)
- Enaya Moshadda (2015)
- Bab Al Hara - Part (8) (2016)
- Ahmar (2016)
- Maa Wakf Al Tanfeeth (2022)

He also participated in a few films: Altaqreer (The Report) with Doraid Lahham Alqatl an Tareeq Al Tasalsol (Serial Killing) with Mona Wassef
