= Zuhair Ramadan =

Syrian actor (1959–2021)

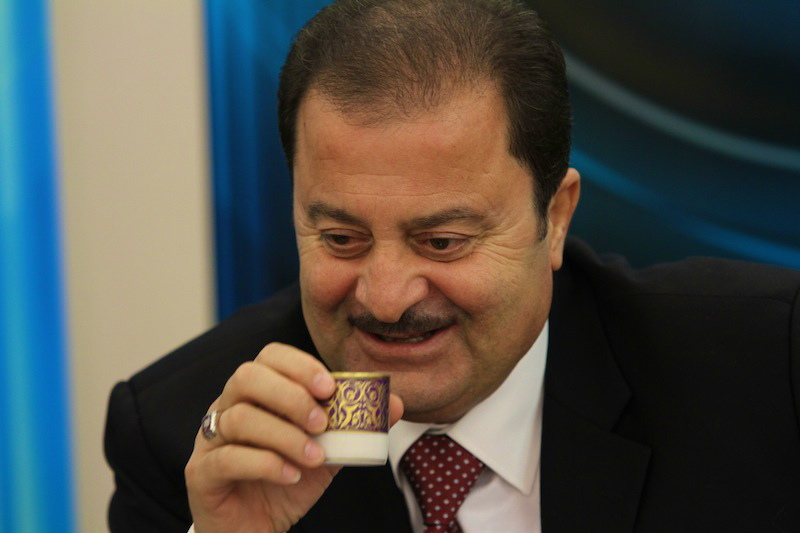
- Ramadan in 2010
- Born: Zuhair Labib Ramadan; 21 June 1959; Latakia, United Arab Republic
- Died: 17 November 2021 (aged 62); Damascus, Syria
- Other names: Abu Zakwan
- Occupation: Actor
- Years active: 1988–2021
- Notable work: Bab al-Hara

Zuhair Ramadan (Arabic: زهير رمضان; 21 June 1959 – 17 November 2021) was a Syrian actor.

== Biography ==
He graduated from the Higher Institute of Dramatic Arts in Damascus in 1983. He became a member of the Syrian Artists Syndicate the same year.

He was elected chairman of Syrian Artists Syndicate on 10 October 2014, and became a member of the People's Assembly for the 2016 session.

== Controversy ==
Ramadan had a number of controversial statements and decisions after he took over the chairmanship of the syndicate in 2014, among which he dismissed several artists for failing to pay the fees. Ramadan was also considered one of the strongest supporters of the Assad government.

== Death ==
Ramadan died Wednesday evening, 17 November 2021, at the age of 62, after suffering a severe pneumonitis, according to the Ministry of Information.
