= Mhd Moumen Almalla =

Syrian TV director

Muhammad Mou'min Almalla
- محمد مؤمن الملا
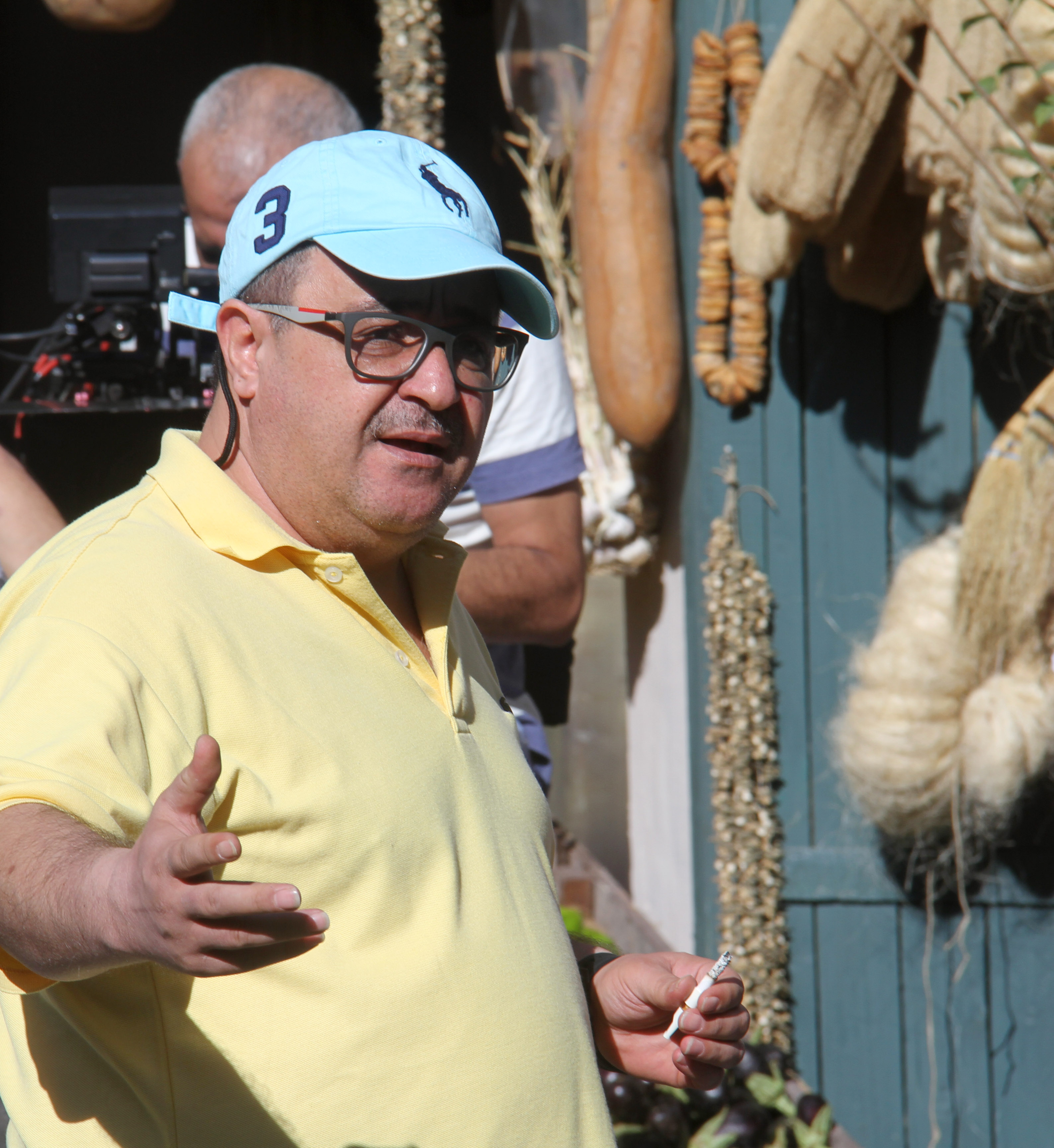
- Almalla in 2016
- Born: 25 October 1965 (age 60); Akrad neighborhood, Rukn aldeen District, Damascus, Syria
- Website: www.aladham-int.com

Muhammad Mou'min Almalla (Arabic: محمد مؤمن الملا; born 25 October 1965) is a Syrian TV director and producer. He is known in the Arab world for directing many famous TV series: Alzaeem (Arabic: امسلسل الزعيم), Hamam Shami (Arabic: حمام شامي) and Bab Alharah (Arabic: باب الحارة).

== Personal life ==
He was born and raised in Damascus with his father, the artist ['Adham Malla]. He graduated from the General Secondary School of Science and then joined the General Institute of Electrical Industries and graduated from it. In 1986, he married at an early age and did not exceed twenty years, and then began his struggle to secure his livelihood and support his new family. He started a career in his field of electricity and did not continue in this field. He then moved to work in several fields before starting his career in the world of TV art productions. In 1989, he began producing drama TV series.

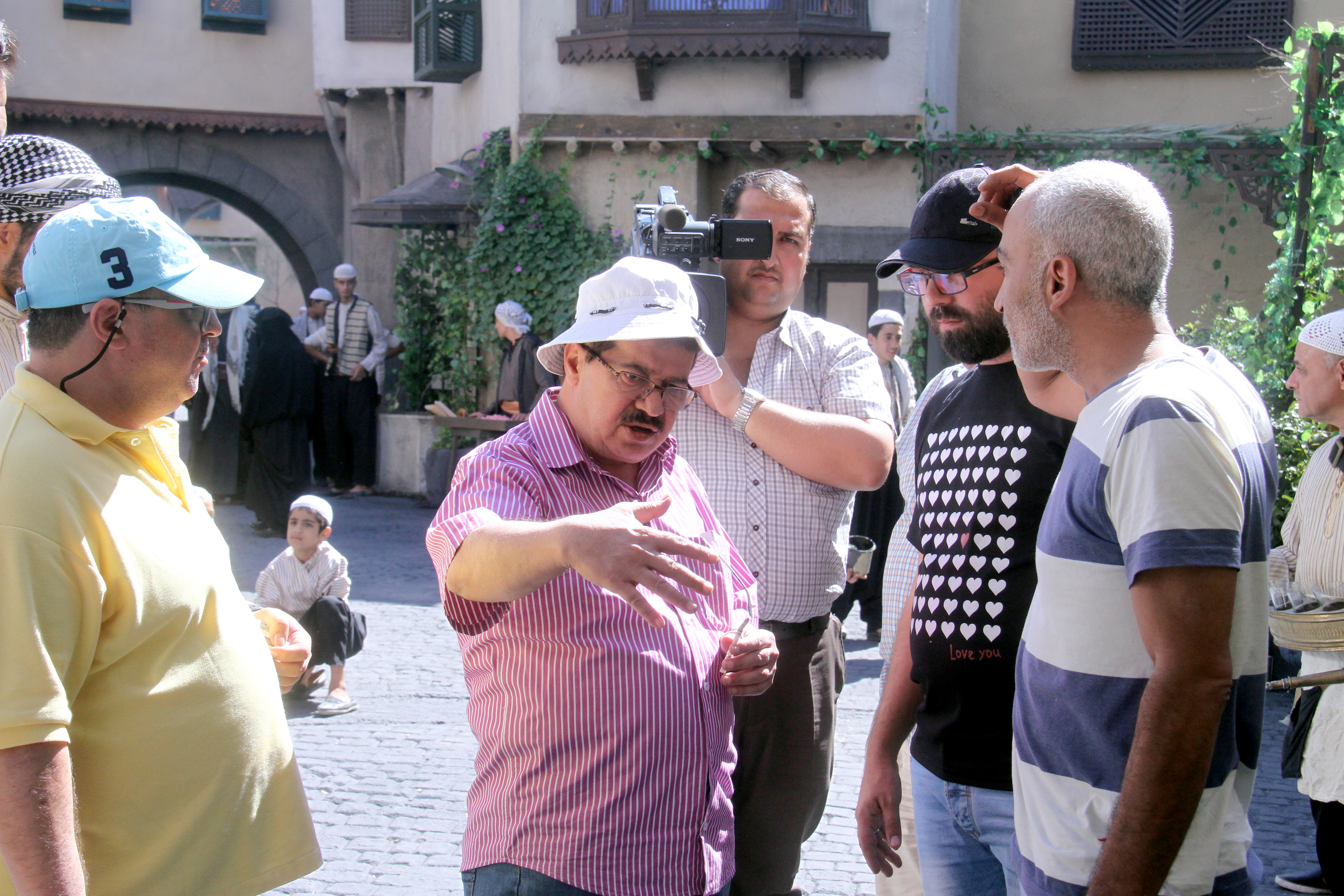
Brothers Moumen and Bassam almalla

== Technical beginnings ==
In 1989, he made a decision that changed his career completely. He asked his father, Adham Malla, and his brother, [Bassam Al Malla], to obtain an entry permit only for Syrian Arab TV to involve all kinds of television work. Many people after a very short period of time noted his abilities and talent.

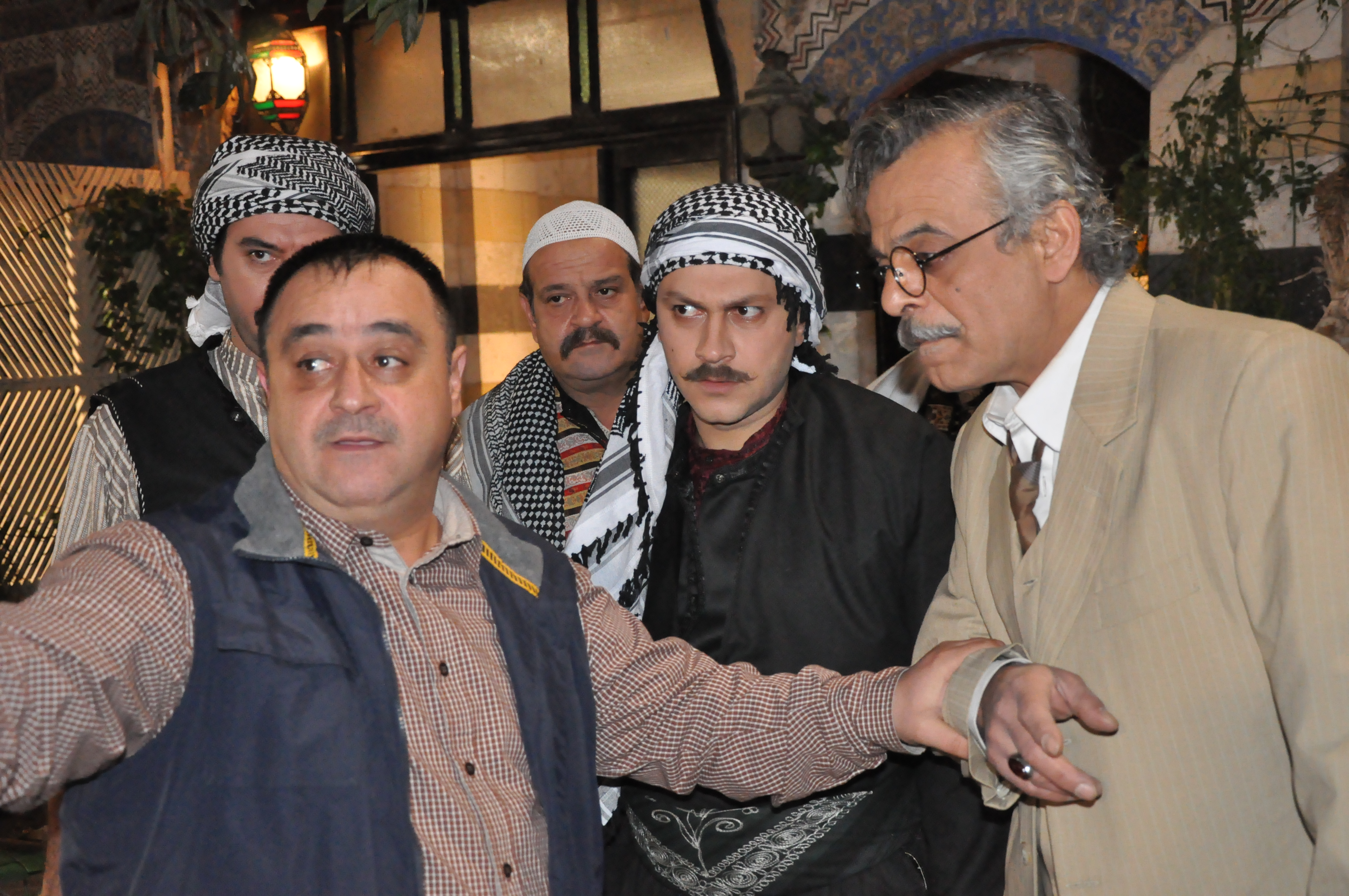
TV Director Moumen Almalla & Fayez Qazaq

In the course of less than a year, he became the director of the main variety of programs in the Syrian Arab Television Network before the spread of satellite channels. During his time managing the various programs, he managed the television with his creative abilities over the next five years.

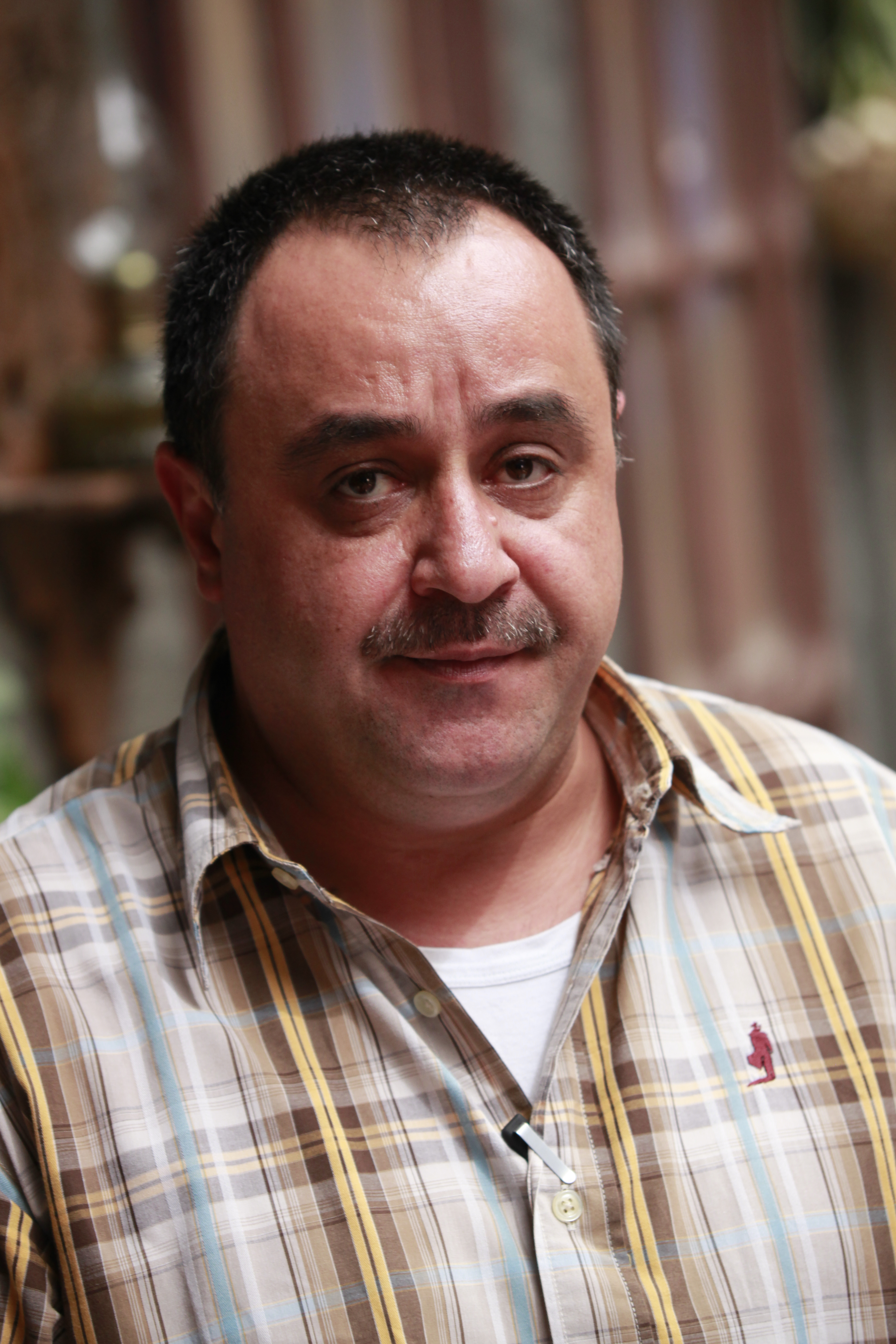
Mhd Moumen Almalla

During this period, he played the role of many of an assistant director for many of famous Syrian drama directors. Working with them to improve his artistic expertise. In 1996, Malla was the head of the artistic groups who were responsible for the first Satellite Syrian channel, and he won the membership of the [Syrian Artists Syndicate] as a television director according to his achievements in Syria satellite channel.

== Drama ==
In [1999], Abu Dhabi TV showed him working as an outlet in their first dramatic production, but days after his arrival in Abu Dhabi, the TV decided to direct him to produce the series "[Hayer Tayer]" which was a success and a good echo. But the director, Almalla, returned to Damascus and continued his artistic activity, and did not prevent him from staying in Damascus from the implementation of the work of many Arab screens, including Dubai TV in the series Arab flags and other works.

== Bab Al harah ==
In 2002, he founded Al Adham Art Production and Distribution Company, which produced numerous documentaries, entertainment programs, commercials, mostly for media outlets in Saudi Arabia, as well as many programs for international organizations such as WHO, UNICEF and UNFPA. What the company produced programs: Made in Saudi Arabia, critical seconds others .. Hot door In the year [2008], the contact between him and his brother, director Bassam alMalla, who presented Bab Al Hara the first season and the second one gave the success of an unprecedented Arab popular was agreed between the two brothers for the first time in the drama to complete the third season,

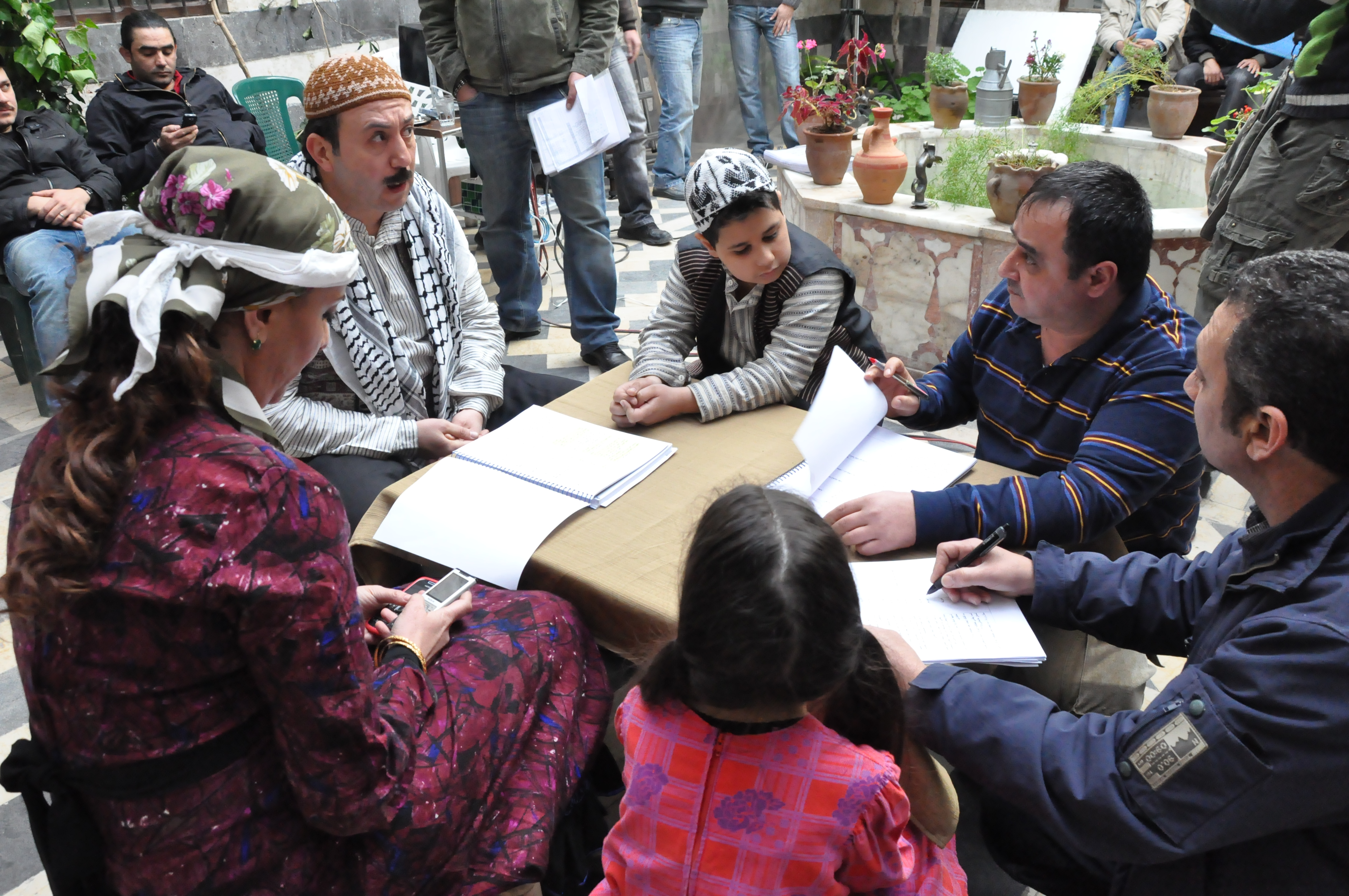
Mhd Moumen Almalla TV director

And by a global statistic that ranked eighth in global viewing ratios. Accordingly, the decision to allocate the fourth and fifth seasons be Direct by Moumen Al-Malla 2011

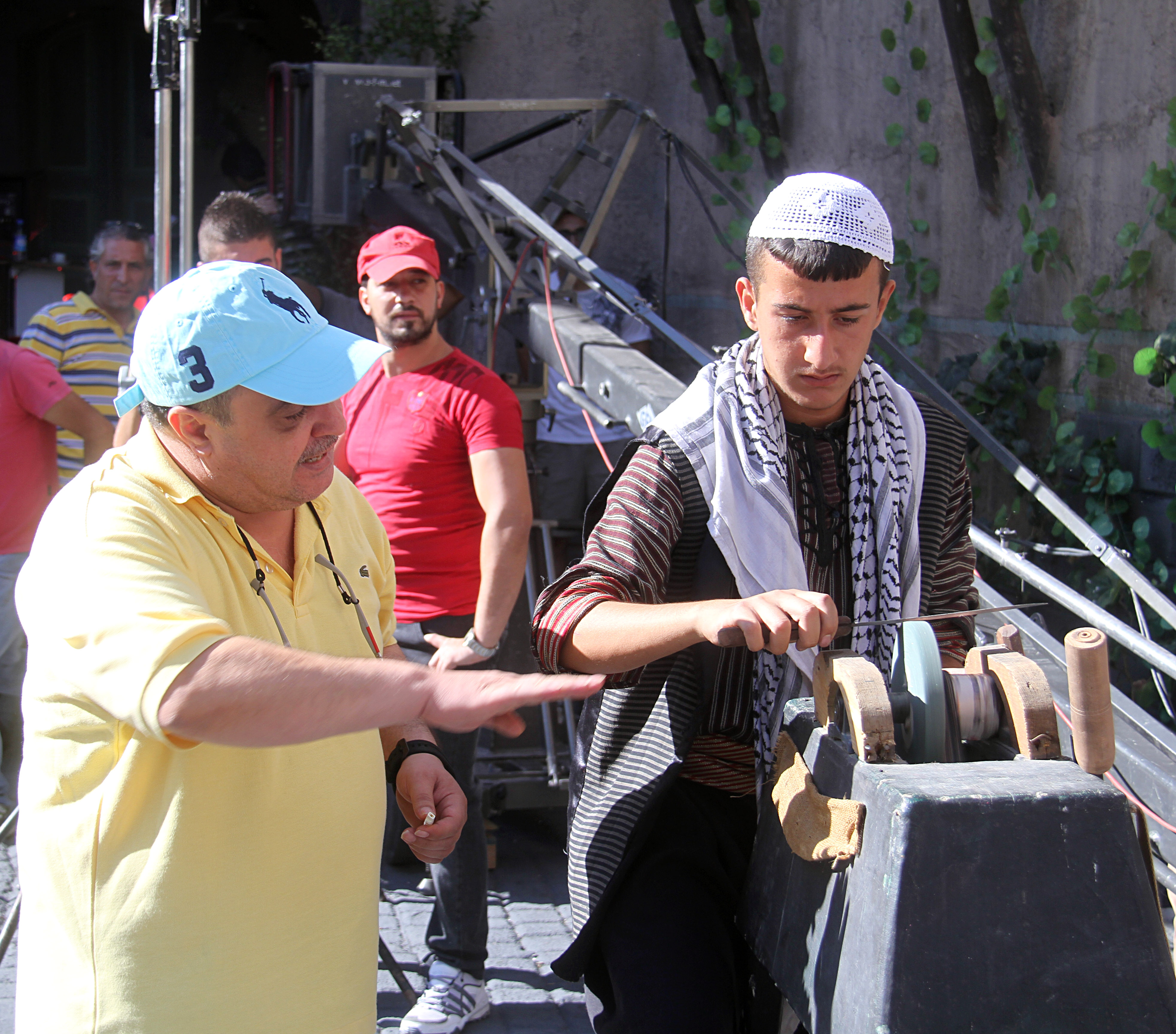
Mhd Moumen Almalla TV director

.

== Aladham international ==
In 2011 he moved with his family to Dubai and founded the international company Adham, Which produced the first drama production in studios in Abu Dhabi, the series Hamam Shami, which won the Golden Award for Comedy at the 2014 Gulf Festival and won the Best Decor Award. 3 prizes for" twofour45 "in the Forum of Radio and Television Professionals – Statement <! - Title The Middle East is offered by Broadcast Pro Middle East specialized in artistic production.

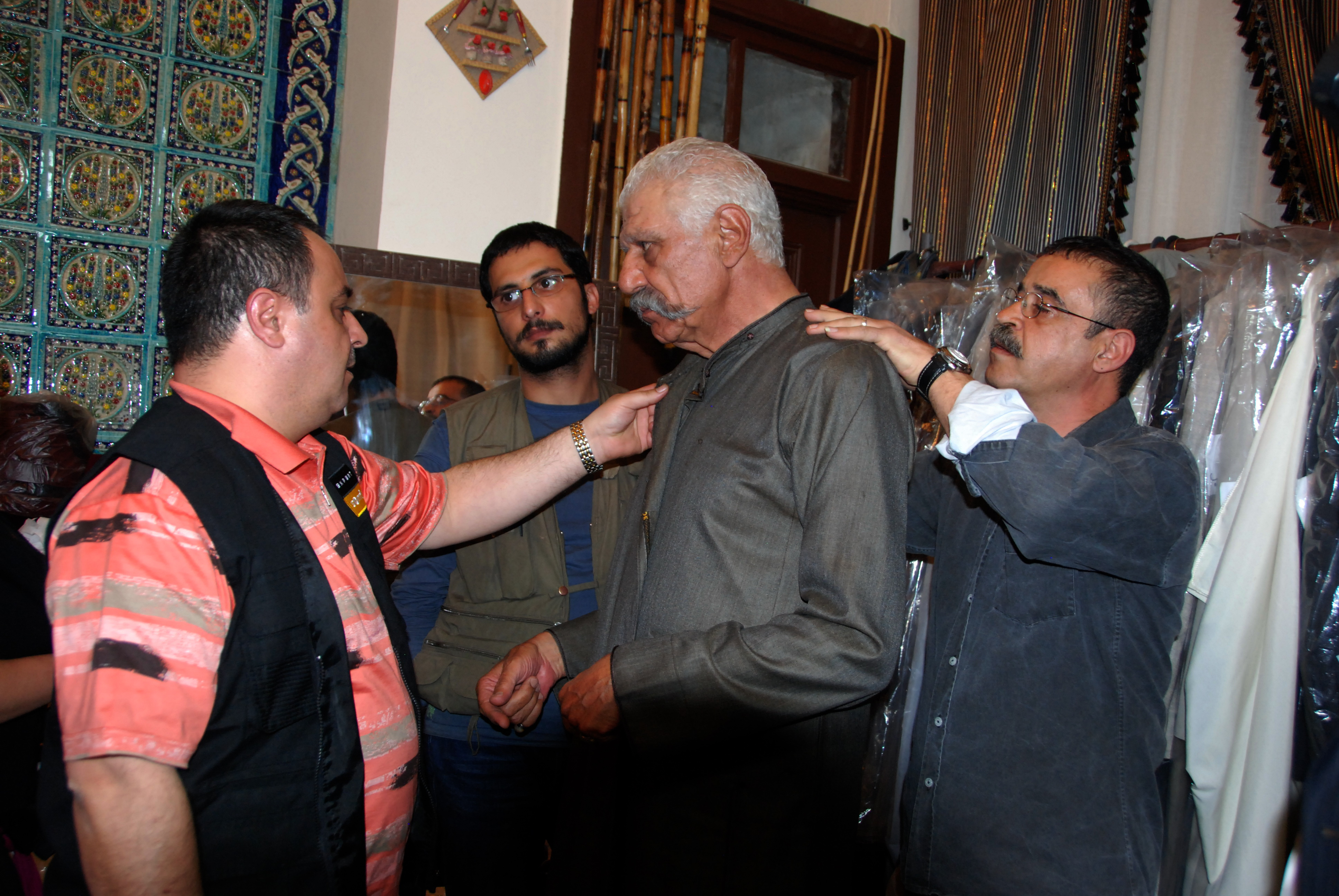
brothers Moumen & bashar almalla with Khlaed Taja

== tubeup channel ==
In the late 2014, an agreement was signed between the Abdul Samad Al Qurashi group and director Almalla to establish a large media company that monitors the provision of technical production services, electronic marketing, and events. It has a YouTube channel [tubeup ] and is preparing to produce a drama in the nineteenth century in the old Hijaz.
