= Mamoon al-Farkh =

Syrian actor (1958–2020)

- Born: January 31, 1958; Damascus, Syria
- Died: May 21, 2020 (aged 62); Damascus, Syria
- Education: Higher Institute for Dramatic Arts, Damascus, Syria
- Occupation: Actor
- Notable work: Bab Al-Hara, ِAbu Samir Al-Humsanii

Mamoon al-Farkh (Arabic: مأمون الفرخ; 31 January 1958 – 21 May 2020) was a Syrian television, theatre and voice actor who worked on several Dubbing animation TV series and Radio voice-over and Radio drama. He died from a heart attack on 21 May 2020.

== Acting Works ==
- Diwan Arabs
- Migration hearts
- Family wars
- Painting the black
- Brothers soil
- Funny But yet !
- Champion of this decade
- Knights wind
- Day's Officer
- Nights Salehia
- al-koary
- Lamps Ramadan
- Bab al-Hara (Abu samer al-hmsane)
- Age madness
- Something resembling love

== Voice roles ==
- Detective Conan as Shin'ichi Kudo(Seasons 1 and 2)
- Detective Conan: The Time-Bombed Skyscraper – Ninzaburo Shiratori
- Detective Conan: Zero the Enforcer – Shinichi Kudo
- Robin Hood no Daibōken
- Dexter's Laboratory as (Major Glory from The Justice Friends) (Syrian dubbing version)
- Hunter X Hunter Satotsu, Matthew, Kiriko son, Majtani, Bodoro, MASTA
- Battle B-Daman
- One Piece - Helmeppo (episodes 2–3), Shanks, Mohji, Jango, Yosaku, Gin, Additional Voices
- Dragon Ball Shu, Turtle
- Dragon Ball Z – Yamcha (first voice) Turtle
- The Real Adventures of Jonny Quest as (Race Bannon)
- The New Adventures of Jonny Quest as (Race Bannon)
- Monster Rancher as (Tiger)
- The Mask: The Animated Series as (Lt. Mitch Kellaway)
- Minky Momo - Additional Voices
- Justice League as (Felix Faust and The Shade)
- What's New, Scooby-Doo?
- Dragon Booster as (Parmon Sean)
- Digimon Adventure as (Etemon, Whamon, Gennai)
- Garfield and Friends
- The Adventures of Sam & Max: Freelance Police - Additional Voices
- Ice Age: Dawn of the Dinosaurs as (Buck) (Syrian dubbing version)
- Lost Universe as (Rail Claymore)
- Sonic the Hedgehog - Additional Voices
- Captain Tsubasa as (Taro Misaki (adult season 3 only), Hiroshi Jito (season 3 only), Hikaru Matsuyama Sakun Khongsawat, Hanji Urabe (adult season 3 only)
- Tsurikichi Sampei
- The Scooby-Doo Show as Mr. Carp

== Dubbing roles ==
- Kamen Rider Ryuki
- Captain Power as (Lt. Michael 'Tank' Ellis)
- Superhuman Samurai Syber-Squad as (Tanker)
