= Mohammed Rafeh =

Syrian actor

- Born: 9 March 1982; Aleppo, Syria
- Died: 2 November 2012 (aged 30); Damascus, Syria
- Occupation: Actor
- Years active: 1999–2012

Mohammed Rafeh (Arabic: محمد رافع; 9 March 1982 – 2 November 2012) was a Palestinian Syrian actor popular around the Arab world. He was notable for his role as Ibrahim in the popular Syrian television series Bab Al-Hara.

Rafeh was born in Aleppo, a half Syrian and half Palestinian. His father was a Palestinian refugee as well as an actor, Ahmad Rafeh. Mohammed Rafeh was notable for his support of the Syrian government. During the Syrian Civil War, Rafeh's picture appeared on a Facebook page titled "The black list of Syrian artists". Rafeh's father said that Mohammed loved Syria and the president Bashar al-Assad.

== Death ==
Rafeh was kidnapped by the Free Syrian Army's al-Siddiq battalion on 2 November 2012 in Damascus' Barzeh neighborhood. On the same day, he was executed by gunshots to his head, neck and shoulders. On 4 November, his body was returned to his family and buried the next day.
