= Nawar Boulboul =

Syrian theatre director

Nawar Bulbul
- Born: April 25, 1973 (age 53); Homs, Syria
- Occupations: Playwright, Director, Actor
- Writing career
- Notable works: Small World; Jadal

Nawar Bulbul (Arabic: نوار بلبل) is a Syrian theatre director, actor, playwright, and founder of Al-Khareef Theatre Troupe in Damascus, Syria.

== Career ==
Most noted for his acting role in the widely watched Arab historical drama Bab Al-Hara, Nawar Bulbul has received numerous awards and performed in plays internationally. He received nominations for best actor in his role in the play Ismail Hamlet at the LIFT London and Carthage theatre festivals. In 2006 he travelled to Texas for the Midland International Theatre Festival, where he received an award for excellence in acting.

In 2010 Bulbul and his writing and acting partner Ramez Alaswad returned to the United States where they performed their two man show The Solitary at the San Francisco International Arts Festival. This was part of a tour that brought Bulbul and Alaswad to Japan, Spain, Canada, and the Czech Republic.

=== Relocation to Jordan ===
In 2011, as a result of his playwrighting and directing work and because of his participation in protests against the Al-Assad government, Bulbul was forced to relocate to Jordan. In 2014 he began working with children in the Zaatari refugee camp in Mashraq, Jordan, where he directed approximately 100 young actors in an adaptation of Shakespeare's King Lear. This work attracted the attention of the international press and the UNHCR. In an interview with the New York Times on March 31, 2014, Bulbul explained, "The show is to bring back laughter, joy and humanity."
