= Bab Al-Hara =

Syrian television program

- باب الحارة
- Genre: Historical Syrian Drama Series
- Written by: Marwan Qawooq; Kamal Mara
- Directed by: Bassam Al-Mulla; Muhammad Zuhair Rajab
- Starring: Abbas Al Noury; Sabah al-Jazairi; Milad Youssef Ahmad Harhash
- Theme music composer: Saad Al-Hussainy
- Opening theme: Bab Alhara
- Ending theme: Bab Alhara
- Country of origin: Syria
- Original language: Arabic
- No. of seasons: 13
- No. of episodes: 434

Production
- Production location: Syria
- Camera setup: HD
- Running time: 40—45 minutes

Original release
- Network: MBC LBCI
- Release: 23 September 2006 – 22 April 2023

Bab Al-Hara (Arabic: باب الحارة; "The Neighbourhood's Gate") is a Syrian drama television series. One of the most popular television series in the Arab world, it is reportedly watched by millions of people in the Arab world. The series chronicles the daily happenings and family dramas in a neighborhood in Damascus, Syria in the inter-war period under French rule when the local population yearned for independence. The appeal is cross-generational, and viewers include Muslims, Christians, Druze and Jews from Arab countries. The show was a huge success in the Arab World, so MBC managed to renew it for a second season. The series' second season was even a bigger success, and the finale was watched by over 50 million viewers around the Arab World. It was renewed for 10 more seasons.

The show announced its cancellation due to a long run of seasons. The series made a comeback in Ramadan 2014, with season 6. It has been proposed that it be filmed in Dubai on film sets, but many Syrians protested against this as it removes the Bab Al Hara sensation. The sixth season premiered in Ramadan 2014 on MBC HD Channels and received mixed reviews.

== Overview ==
Bab Al-Hara aired during Ramadan and forms part of the emerging modern tradition of the Ramadan soap opera. The Arab satellite channels broadcast special programming every night during Ramadan to try to capture audiences from among the families who have gathered together to eat and break the fast.

Directed by Bassam al-Mulla and broadcast on MBC, the first installment of the series, comprising 31 episodes, aired during Ramadan in 2006 and enjoyed broad viewership and a positive reception. The second installment, entitled Bab al-Hara 2, was highly anticipated, receiving even wider acclaim in Ramadan of 2007. A third installment to be aired in Ramadan of 2008 was officially announced on al-Arabiya channel in October 2007, and focused on the post-marriage lives of the children of Abu Issam, the local doctor and barber.

Like many of the most recent popular Arabic series, Bab al-Hara is a Syrian production, financed by the Gulf-state satellite channels. It reflects a new trend representing the shift of Arabic media dominance away from the Egyptians to the Syrians.

Two more Bab al-Hara seasons were aired in Ramadan 2009 and 2010. Bab al-Hara 4 and 5 were produced directly after each other just like Bab al-Hara 1 and 2. This was announced just after airing 10 episodes of Bab al-Hara 3 after realizing that Bab al-Hara 3 was able to keep its audience and not decline in ratings. It is obvious that MBC will be the channel to broadcast the series during the next 2 years, although this year they did give the rights to Libya Al-Shababiya (Libya Youth Channel) to broadcast Bab al-Hara 3 at the same time of airing it in MBC.

== Historical context ==
Bab al-Hara takes place in the 1920s through the 1940s, a time when much the Middle East was colonized by Western powers. Syria was occupied by France and Palestine was occupied by The United Kingdom. Meanwhile, Jewish people were brought into Palestine by England after Prime Minister, Baldfour's Declaration to give the land of Palestine to Jewish people. Before the 1920s, the percentage of Jewish people in the region was very small (under 5%). The entire region including the current countries of Syria, Lebanon, Palestine was called "Greater Syria" until European colonist occupied the land and divided it among them.

Some of the neighborhood men formed a resistance in Syria to fight France. This was shown at the end of the second installment of the series. Palestinians also formed a resistance to defend their lands from the British and the incoming Jewish people. Jewish people started coming into Palestine in larger and larger numbers. In 1948, the day that the British left (before the date told to the Palestinians, which helped the Jewish people there to wage a surprise attack), a full fledged war was waged and resulted in the occupation of most of Palestine (except for the West Bank, the Gaza Strip, and some land surrounding current Gaza). These areas, the Gulan heights, and Sinae from Egypt was occupied in 1967. Syrians were also helping Palestinians by especially sneaking weapons in. This was shown around the third installment of the series.

Bab al-Hara depicts the last moments of Syrian society as it existed in its centuries-old Ottoman era make-up, just prior to the transition into the colonial and post-colonial period. The series' ouches emotions of nostalgia for this era partially which partially explains its massive popularity, an expression of the Arab world's nostalgia and yearning for a revolution that came after the cataclysmic turmoil and cultural identity crisis ushered in by the colonial period.

== Background ==
Bab al-Hara is based on an interpretation of life in the old city of Damascus. Every neighborhood, or hara, has its own Zaa’im, a chosen older man held in high regard. Ideally chosen Zaa’im based on his history in the neighborhood, the zaa’im depended on a number of men from the neighborhood gathered around him to assist him in his functions. These members along with the zaa’im constituted a small nucleus that ran the hara and decided on what was good for it. Wealthier members funded the zaa’im and had a say in its use, such as use for public renovation, given to charities for the poor or set aside for emergency uses. Members generally were of the mercantile class, having steady incomes from having shops or businesses, such as barber shops, bakeries, smiths, ghouta orchards, groceries or other merchant activities.

Evidence and old actors statements (i.e., Hussam Tahseinn Beik) point out that the depiction of the culture during this time period, especially at the start of the series, was exaggerated and sometimes totally inaccurate. The "zaa'im" of each neighborhood did not really have that much power. There was much more interaction between neighborhoods. The series inaccurately depict the neighborhood as if they had some self governing status almost as if they were states or federation (by practice not law). This was not at all the case. The aggression between neighborhoods and the oppression of women was hugely exaggerated.

"Baab el Hara" opened the door to many series that depict earlier historical periods. Such series always existed, but their number and popularity increased greatly after "Baab el Hara." Some of these other series were less unrealistic in their depiction of the culture during thess eras.

== List of characters ==
Family of Abu Issam

- Abu Issam – Abbas al-Noury (The pharmacist/doctor of Haret Al-Dab3. The French claimed that he died on his way to the ghouta to medicate the injured comrades who fought the British in Palestine, but he returns in season 6 saying that he never actually reached the ghouta) starring 1–2, 6-9
- Issam – Milad Youssef(Eldest son of Abu Issam, owns a barber shop, married to three women: Latfieh, Hoda, and Faiza) starring 1–9
- Moataz – Wael Sharaf/Mustafa Saadedine (Younger son of Abu Issam, married to Khayriye and Sara. Abu Zafer thought he killed his son Zafer. He went to jail, but he was released when it was discovered that Sam’o killed Zafer) starring 1–9
- Souad – Sabah Jazairi (Abu Issam's Wife) starring 1–9
- Jamila – Taj Haidar/Dana Jaber/Hala Rajab (Daughter of Abu Issam and married to Bashir) starring 1–9
- Dalal – Anahid Fayad/Rubeen Issa (Daughter of Abu Issam; she married Ibrahim in season 3 but he died shortly after. Later she married Sam'ao but they later divorced ) starring 1–9

Family of Abu Hatem

- Abu Hatem – Wafeq Al-Za'em/Salim Sabry (Coffee shop owner, father to 7 girls and 1 boy) starring 1–7
- Umm Hatem – Sabah Barakat/Nahed al Halabi (Wife of Abu Hatem) starring 1–9
- Sharifeh – Jomanah Murad/Kholoud Issa (Daughter of Abu Hatem and was married to Abu Shehab in season 3. After he dies she remains a widow and refuses to get married after the death of her husband) starring 3–9
- Hamide – Rawad Aliu (Daughter of Abu Hatem and married to Dr. Hamza) starring 3–9
- Mutiea – Fedaa Alkabra (Abu Hatem's daughter; married to Abdo and they have a child together named Karam) starring 3-9
- Iftikar – Lama Ibrahim (Daughter of Abu Hatem) guest 3-9
- Nawal – Ola Bader (Daughter of Abu Hatem) guest 3-9
- Fadya (Abu Hatem's twin daughter)
- Sahar (Abu Hatem's second twin daughter)

Family of Abu Zafer

- Abu Zafer – Ayman Zeydan//Assad Fida starring 6-9 (Owner of a sheep farm; he wanted to be the Hara's leader and was jealous of Abu Issam's leadership and how much the people in Hara love him such that they can't replace him with anyone. He died after Zafer's funeral)
- Fatma Umm Zafer – Marah Jaber (Wife of Abu Zafer) starring 6-7
- Zafer – Moatasim Alnahar (Son of Abu Zafer; married to Bahie but he was killed in season 9) starring 6-9
- Neima – Janiar Hassan (Daughter of Abu Zafer) starring 6-9
- Bahie – Lia Mbardi (Married to Zafer) starring 6-9
- Gaoud : Abd Al Rahman Kouder (Abu Zafer's son, from his previous wife, he doesn't tell the Hara at first that he is his son, so he is known as a worker at Abu zafer's sheep farm) starring 6-7 9

Family of Abu Bashir

- Abu Bashir – Hassan Dakak (Bread seller of the Hara, died before season 6) starring 1–5
- Umm Bashir – Sahar Fawzi (Wife of Abu Bashir) 1–9
- Bashir – Osama Halal (Bread seller of the hara and married to Jamile) starring 1–9
- Hoda – Rasha Al Taqi/Najla Al Khamri/Rama Al Rashed (Αbu Bashir's Daughter, married to Issam) 1–9

Family of Abu Khater

- Abu Khater Salim Kallas (Pottery Shopkeeper) starring 1–5
- Umm Khater Iman Abdul Aziz/Azza Al Bahra (Wife of Abu Khater, dies in season 3 after falling of the ladder while cleaning). starring 1–3
- Khater – Alla Zoubi/Yahia Biazi (Abu Khater's Son) starring 1–9
- Khayriye - Emarat Rezk/Ahed Deeb(Abu Khater's Daughter, married to Moataz) starring 1-8
- Zahra – Dima Al Jundi (Abu Khater's Daughter, married to Riyad, they have a son called Mohammad).starting 1–5
- Riyad – Qays Sheikh Najib/Jihad Abdou (Abu Khater's son in law) guest 1-4

Family of Abu Ibrahim

- Abu Ibrahim – Issam Abaji (Fabric shopkeeper, dies in season 3) starring 1–3
- Umm Ibrahim – Fadwa Mohsen (Wife of Abu Ibrahim, dies before season 6) starring 1–5
- Ibrahim – Mohammed Rafeh (Son of Abu Ibrahim married to Dalal, he dies in season 4) starring 1–3
- Abu Nasouh – Yassin Arnaout (Abu Ibrahim's brother. After the death of his brother, he claims that he owns half of the house and shows his nephew the papers that proves it. But it is shown later that he was lying. Umm Ibrahim gets the papers that prove otherwise, and that shows how he was manipulating them) starring season 3.

Family of Abu Dibo

- Abu Dibo – Adnan Abu Al Shamat (Abu Dibo, married to Abu Hatem's sister Fariza, he later starts to work at Abu Hatem's Coffee Shop) starring 1-5
- Umm Dibo – Raghdaa Salman (Abu Hatem's sister) starring 1-3
- Dibo – Omar al-Masry (Son of Abu Dibo (obviously) starring 1-3

Family of Abu Shehab

- Abu Shehab – Samer al-Masry (He becomes the leader in Hara after the death of the previous leader, marries Sharifa in season 3. He dies in season 4 after accidentally being killed by Abu Draa) starring 1-3
- Abu Qassim Ayman Bahnasi (Owner of Hamam, brother of Abu Shehab and Souad) starring 1–9

Family of Abu Salim

- Saeed Abu Salim – Mohammed Kanou’ (Abu Issam's son in law, married to Buran) starring 1–9
- Buran Umm Salim– Omaya Malas (Daughter of Abu Issam and married to Saeed) starring 1–9
- Salim – Adham Bassam Al Mulla (Son of Saeed and Buran) starring 1–9
- Haddiyah – Masat Al-Jamal (Daughter of Saeed and Buran, her father wanted to force her to get married when she was young, but later regrets his decision, now she's married to Zafer but Zafer was killed) starring 1–9

Family of Abu Bader

- Abo Bader – Mohammed Kheir Al-Jarah (Abu Issam's neighbour) starring 1–9
- Fawziyyeh – Laila Sammur/Shokran Mortga (Abu Bader's wife, who was shown as a troublemaker in the first few seasons) starring 1–9
- Bader (Abu Bader's Son) starring 1–5

Family of Ida3shiri

- Ida'shiri – Bassam Kousa (A Poor man, he steals from Abu Ibrahim and while he was escaping the front guard of the Hara(Abu Sam’oo) sees him which leads Ida’shiri to kill him and bury him in his grandfather's grave (which is located in the house's backyard. He confesses his mistakes and is forgiven by the people in the Hara) starring 1
- Ma3rouf – Hami Bakkar (The eldest son of Ida'shiri and who worked as a porter in one lane, died after being bitten by a snake in his leg.) starring 1
- Subhi – Asim Hawat (son of Ida'shiri, killed in season 6 by the French) guest 1-6
- Nazmeya – Wafaa Al-Abdullah (Ida'shiri's wife died in the first part after she was diagnosed with severe depression as a result of her seeing her husband burying Abu Sam’oo's body) Guest-starring 1
- Shafiqa – Rania Ahmed (Ida'shiri daughter and the wife of Abu Edra3) starring 1

Family of the Za3im

- Al Za3im Abu Saleh – Abdul Rahman Al Rashi (Leader of the Hara, dies in season 2 after being stabbed in the back by Steif) starring 1–2
- Feryal – Wafaa Maosili (Widow and was a troublemaker in the earlier seasons) starring 1–9.
- Latfieh – Lilia al-Atrash (Wife of Issam, has a daughter called Souad with Issam) starring 1–9

Men of Abu Nar

- Abu Nar – Ali Kareem (Strong Man and Leader of Haret Al-Nar) starring 1–9
- Yehya - Youssef Bazzal - (Son of Abu Nar who comes back from Lebanon in season 7, he is a nurse and works at the French hospital) starring season 7
- Abu Ghalib – Nezar Abohajar (Balila seller of Haret Al-Nar; he was a Troublemaker, he used to hate Haret el dabi3) starring 1–3
- Abu Dra'a – Ramez Alaswad (Used to work at Abu el Nar's shop) starring 1, 4–5
- Abu Hakam – Haitham Gaber (Friend of Abu Nar, works with him) starring 1–9
- Abu Satoor – Ramez Atallah (Friend of Abu Nar) starring 1, 4–6
- Abu Tmayer – Daoud Shamy (Abu Ghalib brings him to see if there is gold buried in the house of Abu el Nar's Aunt, but later shows that he was just using him and Abu el Hakam to eat food as he was poor.) guest on season 3
- Nemes – Mustafa El Khani (An outlaw who wreaks havoc especially when he decides to team up with Abu Satoor; Brother of Al-Wawi. He tried to commit suicide, but he is still alive) starring 4–5, 7-9
- Faiza – Hanouf Kharbatli/Hala Yamani (Daughter of Abu-Nar. Issam married her after two wives) guest 5-9

Haret al-Yehud

- Moussa Abu Nassim - Jihad Saad (Doctor of the Jewish Hara) starring 7
- Hanne Umm Nassim - Amana Wali (Wife of Abu Nassim, died in the 20th episode of season 7) starring 7
- Nassim - Yamen Hajli - (Son of Abu Nassim and the brother of Sara) starring 7
- Sara - Kinda Hanna - (Daughter of Abu Nassim, who shares a deep love story with Moataz, despite being from other religion and Hara, when Abu issam finds out about their relationship he commands Moataz to stop seeing her, because her father is his friend and also he wants to avoid trouble. That leads Moataz to break things with Sara. She then decides to escape to be with Moataz. They later get married in season 7)
- Umm Moris - Sanaa Sawah - (Umm Nassim's Friend and the mother of Moris) starring 7
- Moris - Mohammed Hamada - (Umm Moris's Son, he likes Sara and often hinted that he wants her to be his wife, so when she runs off to be with Moataz he gets angry and teams up with Nassim to get her back. But Nassim regrets his decision soon after saying that Sara is his sister and doesn't want to harm her or Moataz) starring 7
- Rabbi Khanou - Nadeer Lakud - (A Rabbi for Haret al-Yehud) starring 7-8
- Hajar - Rasha Rustom - (Friend of Sarah, and she was the first person to know about Sara and Moatez's relationship) starring 7

Other Characters

- Sheikh Abdul-Halim – Adil Ali (Sheikh of the Hara) starring 1–9
- Abu Marzouk – Muhammad Al-Shammat (fruit and vegetable seller) starring 1–5
- Abu Samir Mamoon al-Farkh (Owns a hummus shop, killed by Setief) guest 1
- Abu Adil – Ali Tallawy (Storyteller, he often sits and tells stories in Abu Hatem's coffee shop) starring 1–3
- Abu Mahmoud – Adham Al Mala (Used to own a shoe shop, he died before season 6) starring 1–5
- Abu Ahmed – Ahmed Khalifa (he is responsible for cleaning the Hara) guest 1
- Umm Zaki – Hoda Shaarawi (she is the Hara's midwife) starring 1–9
- Abu Majed – Tousam Tahseen Baik (The Hara's guard in the first two seasons, he later leaves the job because of him getting old) Starring 1–2
- Abu Fares – Georges Jabara (The guard of the Hara) starring 3–9
- Abu Sam'ao – Riad Kabra (Hara’s first guard who was killed by Ida3shiri, when he caught him stealing Abu Brahims money) guest 1
- Abdou – Houssam Alshah (A worker in the Hamam, and Bawakey) starring 1–9
- Sam'ao – Fadi Chami (Son of Abu Samao; Was first part of the Military then he leaves to be with his friends at ghouta, and finally he starts to work as the mosque's keeper in Hara) starring 1–8
- Moslem – Ra'ed Musharraf (Employee at Abu Hatem's coffee shop, he was martyred in the battle with the French) starring 1–3
- Dr. Hamza – Baraa Alzaim (Doctor and the husband of Hamide (one of Abu Hatem's daughters) starring 3–6
- Fathi – Samir Achammat (He was a robber, when he is caught by Abu shab he says that he only steals because his family is very poor and needs money to buy them food, so Abu Shab offers him a job at his shop) starring 1–5
- Noury – Hani Shaheen (Cop, dies in season 5 after being shot accidentally by Abu Shaker) starring 1–5
- Abu Jawdat – Zuhair Ramadan (Head of the district police, he has a hatred towards Haret el dabe3) starring 1–9
- Jean Miran – Wathik Solaiman (Commander whose uncle is the principal military adviser to the French Army of the Levant) guest 3
- French Translator – Mohammed Amin (actor) (Translator French army. Was captured after a battle with the French forces while they were smuggled to the men of Ghouta) starring 2–3
- Abu Kamal – Adel Shukri (One of the largest dealers in sham) guest 3
- Kamal – Fadi Wafaay (Son of Abu Kamal's) guest 3
- Shukri "the nurse" – Abdel Nour Balike (Nurse at the hospital. Contributed in the treatment of Abu Khater's son Khater after suffering from a serious injury) starring 3, 4, 5
- Nawar Boulboul appeared in two different roles:
  - Zebaq (He was one of Abu Hassan's men was martyred in the ambush of the French gendarmerie on the morning of his wedding the first part) guest 1
  - Abu Yusuf ((Elias) The Christian Palestinian, came to Damascus, accompanied by his friend, Abu Ahmed, to bring arms to Palestine, cited in Episode 17 of Part IV) guest 4
- Abu Hassan – Mohammed Khrmacho (leader of revolution dies in season 5) starring 1–5
- Abdul Wahab – Haitham Assaf (One of Abu Hassan's men was martyred in the ambush of the French gendarmerie during the liberation of the Abu Shahab families) starring 1–2
- Abu Toni – Khalil Haddad (Aleppo merchant who has a deal with Abu Shehab) starring 2–3
- Abu Noor– Riad Wardiani (Aleppo merchants who have a contract with them, Colonel Abu Shehab to buy arms deal) starring 2–3
- Abu Ahmad al-Shami – Ibrahim Kiki (Assistant of Abu Hassan, leader of the rebels in Ghouta. After the martyrdom of Abu Hassan he became the fifth part is the leader of the rebels Ghouta) starring 3–5
- Abu Ali – Bassam Dakkak (Representative of the Palestinian guerrillas. Went to the Levant in order to obtain weapons from the men Ghouta) guest 1
- Abu Sayah – Saleh Al-Hayek (Moukhtar of Haret al Mawi) starring 3–5
- Hamdi – Andre Skaff (spy for the French dies in season 3 by Mukhtar Abu Sayah and his worker) guest 1
- Abu Arabi – Ayman Reda (3ked Haret al Mawi, and he is also Abu Sayah's Son in law.) guest 3
- Umm Arab – Ghufran Ali (Daughter of Abu Sayah, married to Abu Arab, their only son was killed by the French in Haret el dabe3 after chasing two rebels) guest 3
- Adham – Khaled Al Qeesh (Lawyer in Haret Almawee) guest 3
- Umm Adham – Hala Hosny (Adham's mother) guest 3
- Abu Ali – Muayid Mullah (worker for Moukhtar Abou Sayah) guest 3
- Abu Mounit "the Saw" – Tony Moussa (Arms dealer who bought a gun from Abu Jawdat(Nouri's gun) and sold it to the Abu Shahab.) guest 3
- Muna Wassef appeared in two different roles:
  - Umm Abdullah (The Gypsy of Hara) guest 2
  - Umm Joseph (A strong Christian woman helps fight the French) starring 4–5
- Steif – Maan Abdul Haq (A "blind" spy who wasn't actually blind, killed Abu Samir and Al Za3im) Killed by Abu Shehab after being caught by Me3taz in season 2 episode 29 starring 1–2
  - Abuahmd – Ibrahim Kiki (One of the strongmen of the Hara) guest 3
  - Aliu – Mohamed Anwar al-Masri (Wife) guest 3
  - Hashim Robe (Married) guest 3
- Ma'moon Bek – Fayez Quzuq (A spy claimed that Abu Saleh is his uncle and deceived the people in Hara he marries Feryal; dies in the last episode of season 5 after being caught that he isn't a relative to Abu Saleh but actually a spy) starring 4–5
- Abu Mamdouh – Riad Nahas (Storyteller instead of Abu Adel) starring 1–5
- Rustom – Ahmed Mahasneh (Assistant Chairman of Abu Jawdat station hara, was appointed to the police station after the expulsion of Corporal Nuri from military service, he loves his country and the people and often helps the people in Haret el dabe3) starring 4–7
- Lieutenant Fadi – Alaa Kassem (Sergeant in the French army) starring 4–5
- French Major – Jamal Qbash (Commander of the French army) starring 4–8
- Abou Ahmad – Wael Abu-Ghazaleh (Abou Youssef's Muslim Palestinian friend who goes with Abou Youssef to receive Weapons and is also killed) guest 4
- Abu Abdo – Tarek Sabbagh (worker for Moukhtar abou Sayah) guest 4
- Abu Taysir Akram Tallawy – (Brother of Mamdouh. And his house in a Hara nearby to Haret Al-Dab3. The agreement with his cousin Abu Al Khair to secure the basement to hara the house. Died of illness in Part V) starring 4–5
- Abu Tayeb – Kamal Murra (A Cook in the prison of the castle) starring 4–5
- Abu Hilal – Khaled Al-Maleh (Servant of Ma'moun Bek)killed by Abu Satoor guest 4
- Abou Marei – Sobhi Rifai (works as a builder in the hara) guest 5
- Abu Diab/Abu Gha'uud – Qusai Khouli (Was a prisoner with Abu Issam and knows that Ma'moon Bek is really Lieutenant Nemer and works as a garbage man for Haret Al-Dab3) guest 5
- Abu Shakouch – Zuhair Abdul Karim (Nemes’sold friend) guest 5
- Abu Faisal – Mahyar Khaddour (Abu Diab's cousin he gives Issam the letter from his father that says that he is still alive and well) guest 5
- Abu Yasser – Mohammed Khaonda (Worker for Maamoun Bek) guest 5
- Abu Shakir – Ghassan Al Labni (Worker for Maamoun Bek and goes to jail at the end for killing Nouri) guest 5
- Wardeh – (Abu Bader's adopted daughter, she was adopted by Fawziyyeh after being really connected to her, but she goes back with her birth mother at the end) guest 5
- Samira – Rana Shamis (Wife of Khater) guest 5-9
  - Leh – (Donkey of the Hara)
- Abu Wared – Jalal Al Taweel (Worker for Maamoun Bek) guest 5
- Umm Arabi – Sulafa Auishq (Woman living in the estate working dairy products) guest 5
- Al-Wawi – Mustafa Al-Khani (Nemes' brother who died in the last episode of season 6, Killed by Motaz) starring 6
- Fayad – Shadi Moqaresh (Abu Mahmoud's Nephew, Killed by Al-Wawi) starring 6
- Nadia – Maysoun Abu Asaad (Was later married to Abu Issam; dies in season 7 from tuberculosis/Consumption) starring 6-7
- Sheikh Fehmy – Abdul-Hady Al-Sabbagh (Sheikh who was later killed by Al-Wawi) starring 6
- Tannaki – Jamal Al-Ali (troublemaker often causes trouble in Haret al-Dab3) starring 6-9
- Aziz – Walid Hasoa (Works with the French, but killed by Al-Wawi) starring 6
  - Sallum -Saad Alghifry - (One of Abu Jawdat's workers) starring 7
  - Hilal - Shadi Zeydan - (The French set him up as the son of Tahsin Dumali, but he actually isn't, killed in the last episode of season 7 by Me3taz) starring 7
  - Zaatar - (A former robber and repents dies in season 7; killed by Hilal) starring 7
  - Mahmoud, Adnan, and Jano were wanted by the French in season 7: Mahmoud dies when he was going back to Haret al-Dab3 to tell them the truth about Hilal, but the other two were alive and returned to Haret al-Dab3 in the 29th episode to warn them about Hilal. They are soon become a part in Haret al-Dab3.
- Sergeant Jean - Waseem al-Rahaby - (The Sergeant of the French) starring 6-8

Season 8 Characters

- Zehdi Abdulkarim - Fadi Sabbih (Engineer)
- Khaldiye - Nadine Tahseen Bik (Wife of Zehdi)
- Julie - Sulaf Fawakherji (Lawyer) 8-9
- Mazyan Fatouh - Mustafa Al-Mustafa (Worker for Abu Jawdat from Aleppo)
- Laban - Kefah Al-Kaws (Worker for Abu Zafer, Gets punished for Killing his own sister, Aishe at the night of her wedding)
- Aishe - Inas Zariq (Laban's Sister, Supposed to marry Nemes, Killed by her brother, Laban)
- Abu Farouk - Naeem Hamdi (Went to Jail for stealing flour along with five other robbers)
- Abu Hazem - Abdul-Hady Sabbagh (New Coffee Shop Owner) 8-9
- Ghassan - Talal Mardini (Worker for Zehdi)
- Sheikh Fikri - Zenati Qudsaye (Sheikh Abdul-Alim's former worker who turns out to be a liar)
- Fatna - Ghada Bashour (Robber who goes to jail along with Sheikh Fikri for Kidnapping Shahira, one of Issam's Daughters)
- Fares - Ahmad Harhash Who was a Killer of Shahira Season 8 Guest Starring 5
