= Qays Sheikh Najib =

Syrian actor (born June 5 1977)

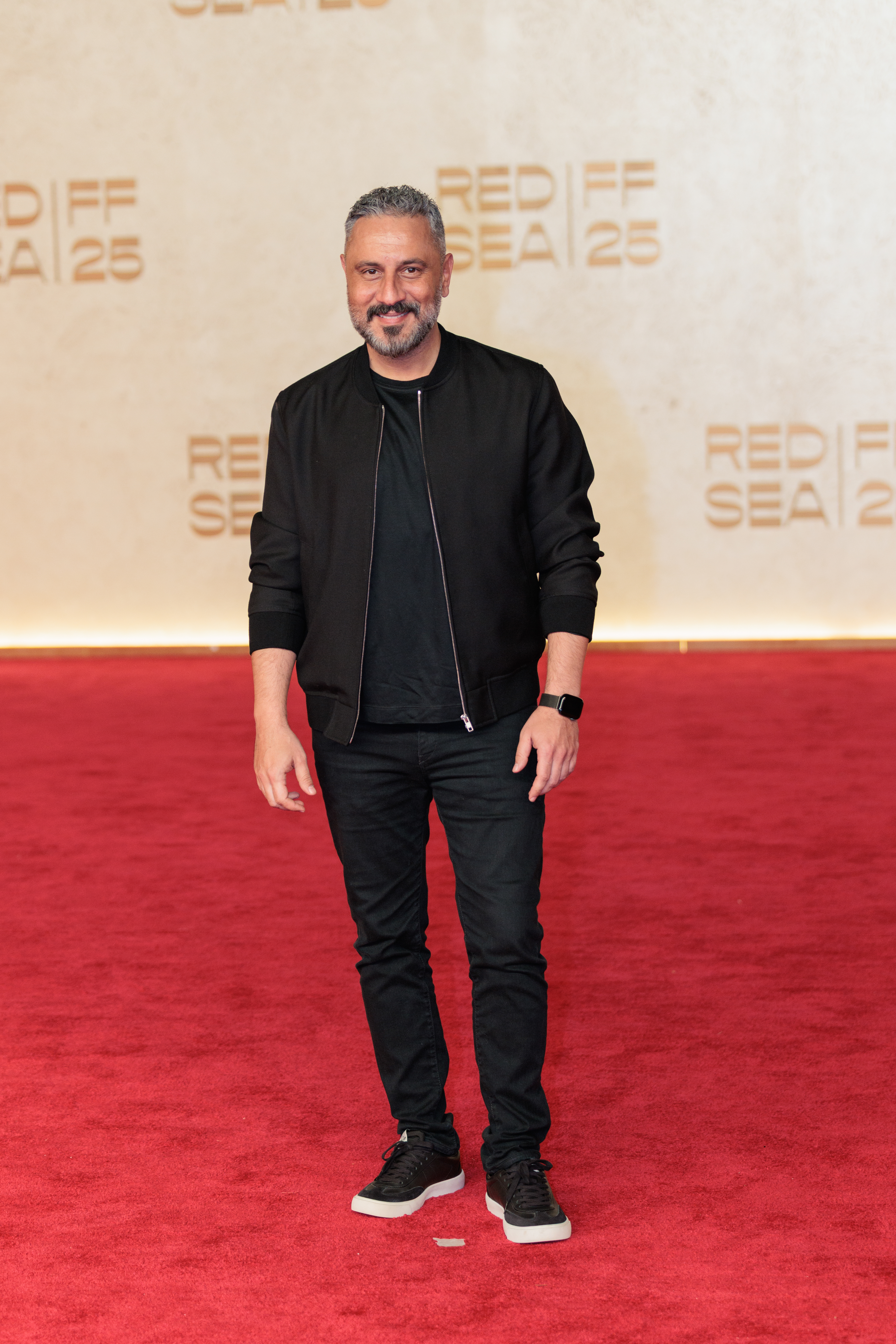
- Born: June 5 1977; Damascus, Syria
- Occupation: Actor
- Years active: 1998–present
- Height: 1.75 m (5 ft 9 in)
- Partner: Lubna Mhalah
- Parent(s): Mohammad Sheikh Najib (father), Khadija El-Abed (mother)

Qays Sheikh Najib is a Syrian film, television and theatre actor born on June 5 1977 in Damascus. His father, actor and director Mohammed Sheikh Najib, and his mother, Khadija El-Abed, a traditional Syrian folk dancer inspired his early curiosity about the stage. Growing up, Sheikh Najib used to accompany his father on set, which nurtured his passion for the craft of acting. He made a few appearances on television and on stage when only a teenager. Sheikh Najib graduated from Damascus's Higher Institute of Dramatic Arts in 1998. Soon after, he earned a scholarship to study in France, where he acted in several festivals, and also appeared in plays in Germany. His repertoire includes not only modern theatre but also world-renowned classics such as Dostoyevsky's Crime and Punishment.

By 2020, Qays Sheikh Najib had more than 70 TV shows to his credit, as well as half a dozen feature films. He has tackled tragedy and comedy, mainstream soap operas and dramas addressing deep social issues.

== Television career ==
After his graduation from the acting academy, Sheikh Najib soon got his break on television with popular Ramadan nighttime Syrian dramas, Al Tayr (The Bird) in 1998, and Al Jamal (The Camel), the next year, which were broadcast across the Arab world. He then appeared in Baqaya Suwar (Remnant Photos) in 1999 and part 3 of Al Bawasel (The Valiant) in 2002. Sheikh Najib anchored his reputation with Layali al-Salhiya (Good Nights) in 2004, a Syrian crime drama with an all-star cast. The same year, he also appeared as Salah in director Hatem Ali's Al-Taghriba Al-Falastiniya, which dealt with the struggles of a Palestinian family over several generations. Sheikh Najib also acted in other titles tackling social issues, such as 2010's Ma Malakat Aymanukum (What Your Faith Owns), which talked about extremism and social chaos.

Qays Sheikh Najib has also acted in several historical dramas, among them Salah El-Din El Ayoubi (2001), Saqf el-Alam (Roof of the World) (2007), where he reprised the role of Antonio Banderas in the 1999 feature film The 13th Warrior, playing Ahmad bin Fadlan, and in Zaman el Barghout (Time of the Flea) (2012), set in Syria during the French Mandate. He also guest-starred in Bab Al-Hara (The Neighborhood's Gate) for the first few seasons of the 10-year-running Ramadan nighttime series.

In 2014, Qays Sheikh Najib starred as Fadi in Al-Ikhwa (The Brotherhood), which was partly directed by his brother Saif Sheikh Najib. The series dealt with a tense internal conflict between five siblings fighting for their wealthy father's inheritance. He also starred in romantic comedies such as Madraset el Hobb (The School of Love) (2016), Yaret (I wish) (2016) and Julia (2018), where he played the role of a psychiatrist. Earlier, he had already played a romantic interest in the 2015 Ottoman-era Lebanese drama Bint al-Shahbandar (Shahbandar's Daughter).

In 2019, Qays Sheikh Najib starred in two high-profile TV series: Syrian contemporary crime drama Massafet Aman (A Distance of Safety), and Haramlek, whose intrigue was set among the background of the rise of the Mamluk in Egypt. In 2020, Sheikh Najib starred as Saad in Awlad Adam (Adam's Children), a role he entirely played with one eye patched. This Pan-Arab series, which was broadcast internationally, centered around two couples' hidden scandals and yearning for triumph.

== Film work ==
Alongside his television work, Sheikh Najib has also appeared in a number of films. He notably acted under the direction of his father in Wa Maza Baad (And After What) in 2002, in Ghassan Shemeit's Al-Hawiye (I.D.) in 2007, and Joud Saeed's Marra Ukhra (Once Again) (2010).

== Television presenting ==
Qays has also delved into television presenting. In 2015, he hosted Arab Presenter on Abu Dhabi TV. In September 2020, he returned to host the third season of the hit talk show A'det Rigala (Men's Gathering) on Orbit Showtime Network (OSN), alongside Nicolas Mouawad and Khaled Selim. Each episode features a female celebrity guest, whom the hosts question from different perspectives, to confront male and female points of views on personal and social issues.

== Awards ==
Qays has been honored with several awards, among them Lebanon's Murex d'Or in 2020, which recognizes excellence in art and entertainment, as well as the Best Actor award in 2007 for his role in the series Aala Haffet al-Hawiya (On the Edge of the Abyss) at the Adonia Festival for his role of Nader. Since 2014, he has been a member of the semi-finals jury of the International Emmy Awards.

== Charity work ==
Qays Sheikh Najib is involved in multiple charity endeavors, including supporting the cause of refugees, on which topic he led discussions with the UNHCR. He has notably been working for several years already with NGO Mentor Arabia, which is dedicated to empowering Arab youth.

== Selected filmography ==
- Awlad Adam (Children of Adam) (2020)
- Haramlek (2019)
- Julia (2018)
- Orchadia (2017)
- Madraset al-Hob (School of Love) (2017)
- Yaret (I Wish) (2016)
- Bint al-Shahbandar (Shahbandar's Daughter) (2015)
- Al-Ikhwa (The Brothers) (2014)
- Zain (2013)
- Marra Okhra (Once Again) (2009)
- Al-Hawiya (I.D.) (2007)
- Bab al-Hara (The Neighbourhood's Gate ) (2006)
