= Nabih al-Azma =

Syrian politician

- نبيه العظمة
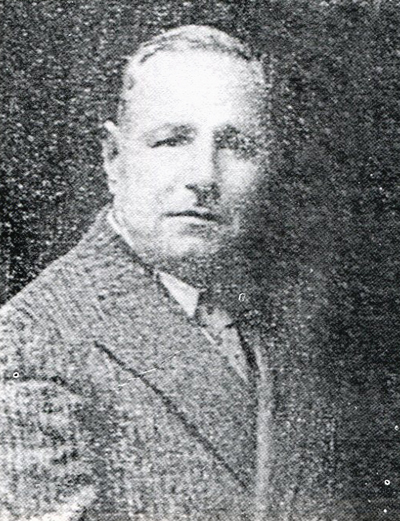

Minister of Defense
- In office 27 April 1946 – 17 June 1946
- Preceded by: Saadallah al-Jabiri
- Succeeded by: Ahmad al-Sharabati

Governor of Damascus
- In office November 1946 – December 1946
- Preceded by: Mazhar al-Bakri
- Succeeded by: Behjat Shehabi

Personal details
- Born: 1886 Damascus, Syria vilayet, Ottoman Syria, Ottoman Empire
- Died: 1964 (aged 77–78) Damascus, Damascus Governorate, Syrian Arab Republic

Nabih al-Azma (Arabic: نبيه العظمة; 1886 – 1964) was a Syrian politician and the defense minister of Syria in 1946.

== Background ==
Nabih was born in Damascus in 1886 to a notable family in Damascus and he was the nephew of Yusuf al-'Azma, members of the al-Azma family in Syria. He studied at the Ottoman Military Academy and graduated in 1917 from Istanbul.

== Career ==
He was elected to the Syrian parliament, and served as defense minister in 1946.
