= Mustafa El Khani =

Syrian actor (born 1979)

Mustafa El Khani مصطفى الخاني
- Born: 1 January 1979 (age 47); Hama, Syria
- Education: Masters of Arts
- Occupation: Actor
- Years active: 1999–present
- Notable work: Bab Al-Hara
- Awards: Best Actor (2016 Bab Al-Hara)

Mustafa El Khani (Arabic: مصطفى الخاني) (born 1 January 1979 in Damascus) is a Syrian actor with Kurdish roots. El Khani graduated from the Higher Institute for Dramatic Arts in Damascus. He played leading roles in several TV series for several TV channels in the Middle East. He used to be the son-in-law of Bashar Jaafari.

== His works ==
=== In TV ===
- Al fawares – 1999
- AlZeer Salem – 2000
- Salah Al-deen Al-Ayyobi (TV series) – 2001
- Houlagou Khan – 2002
- Abed Ramadi Aswoad – 2002
- Bnat Keekoz – 2003
- Rabea Cordoba – 2003
- Alzaher Bibars – 2005
- Qurn Almaez – 2005
- Saqf al-Alam – 2006
- Bab Al-Hara season 4 – 2009
- Bab Al-Hara season 5 – 2010
- Bab Al-Hara season 6 – 2014
- Bab Al-Hara season 7 – 2015
- Bab Al-Hara season 8 – 2016
- Bab Al-Hara season 9 – 2017
