= Salim Kallas =

Syrian actor

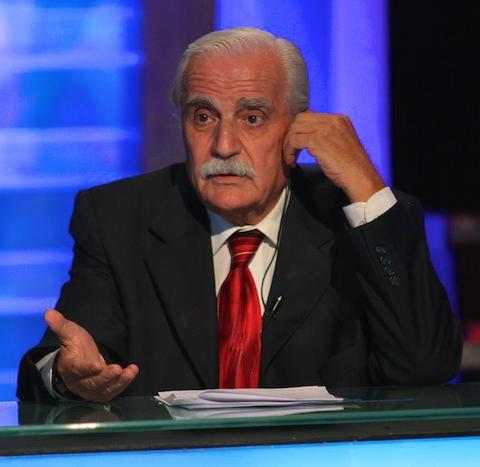
- Slim Kallas in August 2010.
- Born: Salim Kallas; 13 November 1936; Damascus, Syria
- Died: 2 December 2013 (aged 77); Damascus, Syria
- Occupation: Actor
- Years active: 1970–2013

Salim Kallas (Arabic: سليم كلاس; 13 November 1936 − 2 December 2013) was a Syrian actor.

A Damascus-native, He worked at the national theater and at Syrian TV. He began his career in 1970 by participating in plays with university students, and then he worked at the national theater and later at the Syrian TV one year after it was established, where he made his television debut in a television film called "Asha'a al-Wada'a" (Farewell Dinner).

Salim Kallas started his career in theatre while at university, then later entering major theatre productions. Later when television started, Salim began his career as a television star in numerous shows and later on to films. Salim Kallas has five daughters and one son named Mohammed Kallas. His daughters currently live in Lebanon, Lina Kallas, Rania Kallas, Lotus Kallas, Shireen Kallas, and except for one who has moved to America Dima Kallas.

Kallas's acting career expanded on the stage, TV, cinema and radio. On the stage, he performed in Merchant of Venice and Macbeth, while on the radio he was a recurring performer in the popular radio series "Hokm al-Adala" (Rule of Justice).

While appearing in only in four cinematic movies, Kallas's TV career was expansive, which began with the long-running comedy series "Maraya" (Mirrors) in which he performed from its first season up to the most recent one, leading to a long career spanning all genres of Syrian TV shows and making him a mainstay of the medium and a popular figure.

Kallas died following a long illness on 2 December 2013, aged 77, in Damascus. He left behind his wife, a son and five daughters. His burial took place on the following day, 3 December.

== Television ==
Year	Show
1970	Harat Al Qasr
1980	Harb Al Sanawat Al Arba'a
1982	Maraya
1984	Maraya 84
1986	Maraya 86
1988	Maraya 88
1990	Al bina'a 22
1991	Shoofoo Al-Nas
1992	Ayam Shamiyeh
1994	Jawaher
1994	Hamam Al-Qishani
1995	Maraya 95
1996	Maraya 96
1997	Maraya 97
1997	Hamam Al-Qishani 2
1997	Maraya 98
1998	Hamam Al-Qishani 3
1998	Jawaher 2
1998	Ikwet Al-Torab 2
1998	Maraya 99
1999	Maraya 2000
2000	Al-Khawali
2001	Hamam Al-Qishani 4
2003	Hamam Al-Qishani 5
2004	Layali Al-Salihiyeh
2004	Qatl Al-Rabee'
2006	Bab Al-Hara
2007	Bab Al-Hara 2
2008	Bab Al-Hara 3
2008	Bayt Jidy
2009	Bab Al-Hara 4
2009	Bayt Jidy 2 (Al Sham Al-'Adiyeh)
2010	Bab Al-Hara 5
2010	Al-Dabour
2011	Yawmeyat Modeer A'am 2
2011	Maraya 2011
2011	Al-Dabour 2
2012	Tahoun Al-Shar
2012	Zaman Al-Barghout
2013	Qamar Sham

== Theatre ==
- Venice Merchant
- Macbeth
- False confessions (Al E'atarafat Al Kathebah)

== Cinema ==
- Lail Al Rejal
- Naji Al Ali
- Short We Fanilla We Cap
- Wilad Al Amm
