= R. Barrows =

- Born: Mehran Azma; United States
- Occupations: Musician, designer, writer, editor, producer, radio host

Mehran Azma, who creates works under the alias R. Barrows, is an American musician, designer, writer, editor, producer and radio-show host.

Born in the United States, he spent the latter half of the 90s singing and playing guitar in post-punk act The Nightmare Syndicate, who toured and supported acts like The Murder City Devils, The Blood Brothers, The Rapture and others, and was a touring guitarist for the punk band Swindle in the Southern California area. During this time, he was also the editor-in-chief of online music publication Light Up The Sky and contributing writer for OC Weekly. After the dissolution of his previous efforts, he attended Otis College of Art and Design where he received his BA in Graphic Design and continued to play music as bassist and vocalist of Baby's Breath, and released solo material under the moniker Nevers.

In 2011, he relocated to Portland, Oregon and began hosting a weekly radio show called Past Haunts on local radio-station PRA. After the closure of the station due to financial stress, the show was moved to House of Sound where he continues to host on Sunday mornings.

In 2013, he also began co-hosting a second radio show entitled Echo's Answer on KXRY 107.1 FM & 91.1 FM. In 2014, he launched SINIS Recordings and released the first record on the label by Warm Hands. In 2015, he marked the end of Echo's Answer and transitioned Past Haunts onto XRAY.FM, where he continues to broadcast weekly.
