= Yasser al-Azma =

Syrian writer and actor

Yasser Al Azmeh
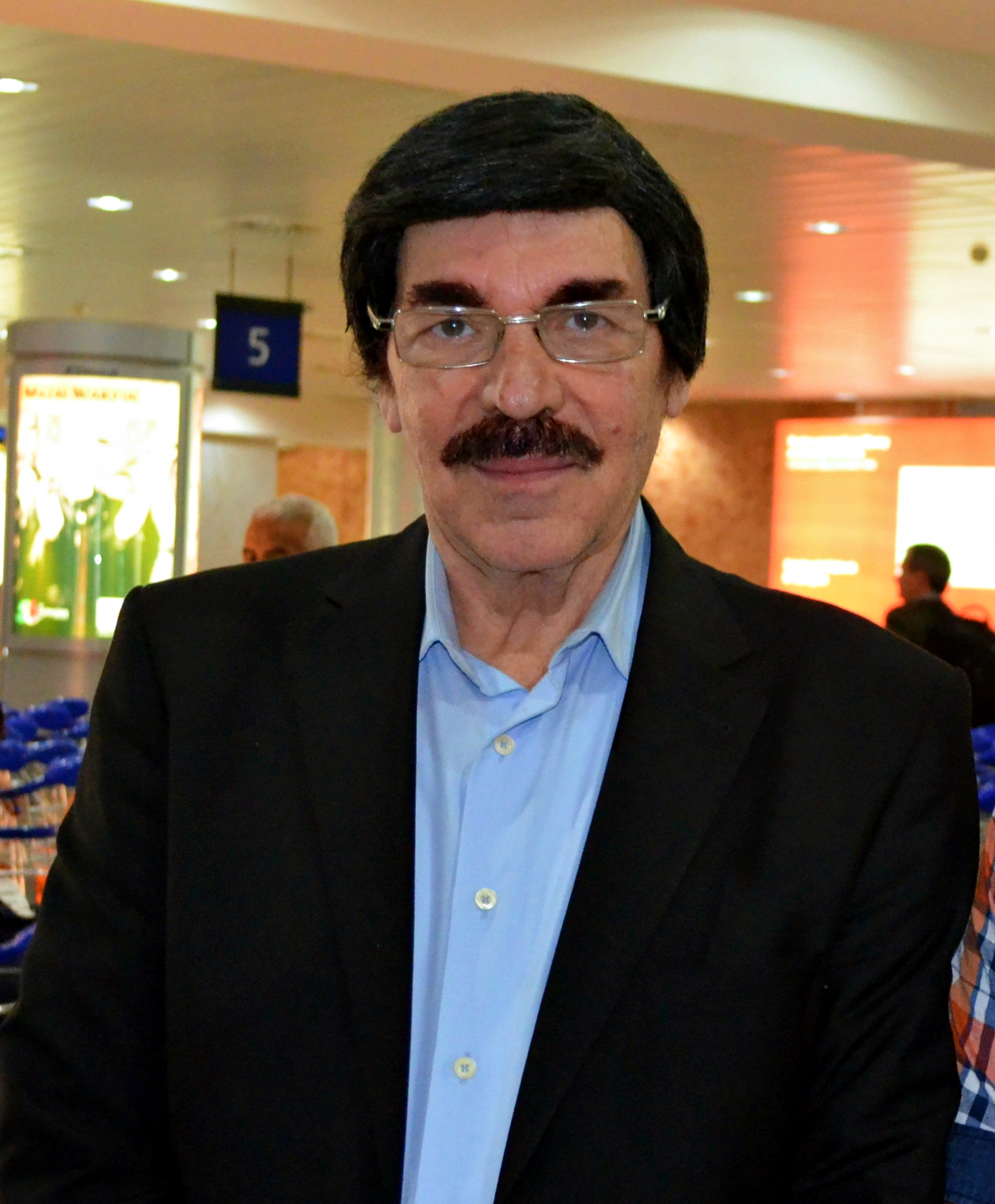
- Yasser Al Azmeh
- Born: May 16, 1942 (age 84); Damascus, Syria
- Other name: None
- Occupations: Actor, screenwriter
- Years active: 1963–present
- Spouse: Sabah Khattab
- Children: 4

Yasser al-Azmeh (Arabic: ياسر العظمة; born 16 May 1942) is a prominent Syrian writer and actor of television and theater from Damascus. He is a member of the highly notable Al-Azmeh Damascene family. Al-Azmeh is best known for the popular comedy series Maraya which was filmed from 1982–2013 for a total of 20 seasons.

== Biography ==
Al-Azmeh achieved stardom when he started work on (Arabic: مرايا, romanized: Maraya, lit. 'Mirrors'), one of the longest-running Arabic television comedy series, in early 1980s. al-Azmeh starred and played leading roles in Maraya and took part in the writing of the series. Although al-Azmeh has had several other television roles, he is best remembered for his roles in Maraya. al-Azmeh won three awards on three occasions in the Cairo International Film Festival for his roles in Maraya, in addition to an honorary award from the Arab Actor's Guild.
