= Maraya =

Syrian television series

Maraya (Arabic: مرايا, lit. 'Mirrors') is a well known satiric multi-season Syrian television series, created by the comedian Yasser al-Azmeh, starting from 1982 to 2013.

== See also ==
- List of Syrian television series
