= Bus lines in Bordeaux =

Logo Bus Bordeaux

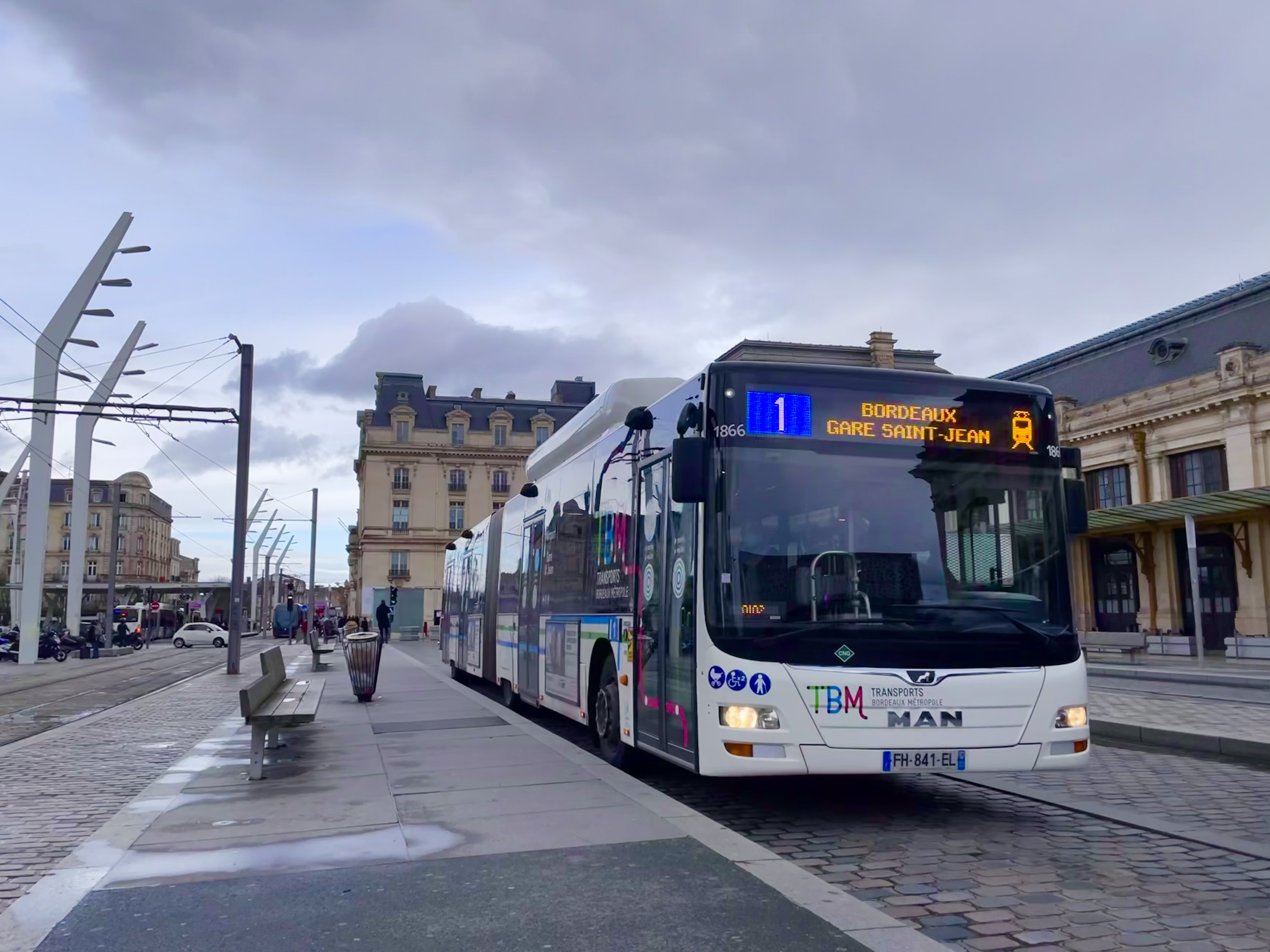
Lianes 1 Bordeaux

Bus lines in Bordeaux are managed by the Urban Community of Bordeaux Public Transport System (Transports Bordeaux Métropole) and Keolis company.
Their network comprises 124 lines:

- 13 high frequency (10–15 minute) services (LIANES),
- 10 main lines which have a service frequency from 15 to 30 minutes,
- 33 other lines,
- 54 special lines reserved for school, called Scodi
- 5 direct lines,
- 1 Night Line (called TBNight)
- 10 Flex' lines (flexible services which follow fixed routes to a location and then pick up or set down on demand in that location),
- 2 shuttles for events in Arkea Arena or Matmut Atlantique stadium,
- 4 lines for tramway maintenance (Relais).

== History ==
- The network was fully reviewed on 4 September 2023 in order to match with new supply and demand (extension of tram lines, express bus lines, demands in peripheric lines ...).
- Changes between old network (which commenced operation on 22 September 2010) and new are still available here for a while.

== Current Network lines ==
=== Lianes ===
There are lines with high level of service (LIgne A Niveau Elevé de Service). These lines constitute with the tram, the main axes of the network. They function from 5 am to midnight or 1 am with a 10- to 15-minute fréquency between 5:30 am and midnight, with an identical service the Saturday morning and a connection to 2 lines of tram at least. On board service is available after 10 pm.

N.	Course	Link	Exploitant
1	Bordeaux-Gare Saint Jean <=> Mérignac-Beaudésert	1	Keolis
2	Bordeaux-Quinconces <=> Le Taillan-La Boétie	2	Keolis
3	Bordeaux-Quinconces <=> Saint-Médard-Issac or Saint-Aubin-Villepreux	3	Keolis
4	Bordeaux-Palais de Justice <=> Pessac-Cap de Bos	4	Keolis
5	Bordeaux-Bassins à flots <=> Villenave-Chambéry or -Courréjean	5	Keolis
7	Bordeaux-Centre commercial du Lac <=> Ambarès-Parabelle	7	Cars de Bordeaux
8	Bordeaux-Pellegrin <=> Gradignan-Centre	8	Keolis
9	Bordeaux-Gare Saint Jean <=> Bordeaux-Brandenburg	9	Keolis
15	Bordeaux-Centre commercial du Lac <=> Villenave-Courréjean	15	Keolis
16	Bouliac-Centre commercial <=> Mérignac-Les Pins	16	Keolis
31	Pessac-Photonique or Gradignan-Beausoleil <=> Ambès-Saint Exupéry or Ambarès-Centre or Bassens-Quai Français	31	Keolis
35	Bordeaux-Cracovie <=> Bordeaux-Gare Saint Jean	35	Keolis
39	Eysines-Cantinolle or Saint-Médard-ZA Picot <=> Villenave-Pyrénées or Pessac-Photonique	39	Keolis

=== Main lines ===
The main lines have a frequency from 15 to 30 minutes. They function from 5 am to midnight. On board service is available after 10 pm.

N.	Course	Link	Exploitant
20	Bordeaux-Brulatour <=> Mérignac-Cimetière Intercommunal	20	Keolis
21	Talence-Peixotto <=> Gradignan-Beausoleil	21	Keolis
22	Blanquefort-Frankton <=> Parempuyre-Fontanieu	22	Keolis
23	Le Bouscat-Hippodrome <=> Bègles-Rives d'Arcins	23	Keolis
24	Pessac-Romainville <=> Bordeaux-Porte de Bourgogne	24	Keolis
25	Bordeaux-Cité du Vin <=> Bouliac-Belle Etoile or -Centre commercial	25	Citram
26	Martignas-Les Pins <=> Mérignac-Lycée Daguin	26	Keolis
27	Lormont-Buttinière or Cenon-Gare <=> Le Bouscat-Place Ravezies	27	Keolis
28	Bordeaux-Galin <=> Bordeaux-Stalingrad	28	Keolis
29	Carbon-Blanc-La Gardette <=> St-Louis-Belle Rive or Ambarès-Bernatet	29	Keolis

=== Lines ===
These lines connect the peripheric cities to another ones and Bordeaux. They function from 6 am to 9 pm.

N.	Course	Link	Exploitant
30	Mérignac-BA 106 or Pessac-Centre <=> Saint-Médard-Galaxie	30	Keolis
32	Bouliac-Centre commercial <=> Bordeaux-Brandenburg	32	Citram
33	Bordeaux-Cracovie <=> Mérignac-Aéroport	33	Keolis
34	Mérignac-Les Pins <=> Pessac-Unitec	34	Keolis
37	Bordeaux-Parc des Expositions <=> Saint-Aubin-Lycée Sud Médoc or -Villepreux	37	Keolis
38	Mérignac-Phare <=> Blanquefort-Caychac	38	Keolis
60	Bordeaux-Stalingrad <=> Bassens-La Chênaie	60	Keolis
61	Bordeaux-Jardin Botanique <=> Ambès-Escarraguel	61	Keolis
64	Artigues-Fonteraude <=> Lormont-Buttinière	64	Keolis
65	Bordeaux-Stalingrad <=> Artigues-Tout Y Faut	65	Keolis
66	Lormont-Lauriers <=> Lormont-Buttinière	66	Keolis
67	Lormont-Buttinière (circular line near Buttinière)	67	Keolis
69	Ambarès-Max Linder <=> Ambarès-Quinsus	69	Keolis
70	Bordeaux-Gambetta Mériadeck <=> Eysines-Lycée Charles Péguy	70	Keolis
71	Le Taillan-Lycée Sud Médoc <=> Mérignac-Barbusse	71	Keolis
72	Le Haillan-Collège Emile Zola <=> Bruges-Gare or Bruges-Zone de Fret	72	Keolis
73	Le Bouscat-Hippodrome <=> Bègles-Rives d'Arcins	73	TBM
74	Mérignac-Fontaine d'Arlac <=> Gradignan-Stade Ornon	74	Keolis
75	Bordeaux-Brandenburg <=> Bruges-Gare	75	Keolis
76	Bordeaux-Brandenburg <=> Parempuyre-Landegrand	76	Keolis
77	Pessac-Bougnard <=> Pessac-Candau	77	Keolis
78	Mérignac-Fontaine d'Arlac <=> Pessac-Toctoucau	78	Keolis
79	Blanquefort-Gare <=> Blanquefort-Ecoparc	79	Keolis
80	Bordeaux-Palais de Justice <=> Gradignan-Stade Ornon	80	Keolis
81	Eysines-Cantinolle <=> Le Taillan-Stade Municipal	81	Keolis
82	Bordeaux-Patinoire <=> Le Bouscat-Hôpital Suburbain	82	Keolis
83	Eysines-Cantinolle <=> Saint-Aubin-Pinsolles	83	Keolis
84	Le Haillan-Rostand <=> Saint-Médard-ZA Picot	84	Keolis
85	Villenave-Chambéry <=> Bègles-Salengro	85	Keolis
86	Bordeaux-Patinoire <=> Bègles-Terres Neuves	86	Keolis
87	Pessac-Centre <=> Villenave-Piscine Chambéry	87	Keolis
89	Villenave-Pyrénées <=> Bègles-Lycée Vaclav Havel	89	Keolis
90	Villenave-Gare <=> Bègles-Lycée Vaclav Havel	90	Keolis

=== Direct lines ===
Direct lines are set in order to make some courses faster, skipping several stops.

N.	Course	Link	Exploitant
51	Bordeaux-Gambetta <=> Mérignac-IMA	51	Keolis
52	Blanquefort-Gare <=> Parempuyre-Fontanieu	52	Keolis
53	Bordeaux-Cracovie <=> Ambès-Escarraguel	53	Keolis
55	Bordeaux-République <=> Pessac-ZA Magellan	55	Keolis
57	Bassens-Carbon-Blanc-La Gardette <=> Ambarès-Centre	57	Keolis

=== Scodi ===
Scodi lines serve schools and function only in school period. Reserved for pupils, inscriptions to take these lines are set every summer.

N.	Course	Link	Exploitant
s1	Cenon-Collège Jean jaurès <=> Artigues-Fontderode	s1	-
s2	Cenon-Collège Jean jaurès <=> Artigues-Fontderode	s2	-
s3	Cenon-Collège Jean jaurès <=> Artigues-Parc du Peyrou	s3	-
s4	Bègles-Collège Berthelot <=> Bègles-Noutary	s4	-
s5	Floirac-Collège Mandela <=> Bouliac-Belle Etoile	s5	-
s7	Lormont-Collège Lapierre <=> Lormont-Palombes	s7	-
s8	Saint-Aubin-Lycée Sud Médoc <=> Saint-Aubin-Genêts	s8	-
s9	Saint-Aubin-Lycée Sud Médoc <=> Saint-Aubin-Segonnes	s9	-
s10	Saint-Aubin-Lycée Sud Médoc <=> Saint-Aubin-Quatre Lagunes	s10	-
s11	Le Haillan-Collège Le Haillan <=> Saint-Médard-Avenue du Haillan	s11	-
s12	Saint-Médard-Collège d'Hastignan <=> Saint-Médard-Robespierre	s12	-
s13	Saint-Médard-Collège d'Hastignan <=> Saint-Médard-Ambroise Paré	s13	-
s14	Saint-Médard-Collège d'Hastignan <=> Saint-Médard-Julien	s14	-
s15	Saint-Médard-Collège François Mauriac <=> Saint-Médard-Place Corbiac	s15	-
s16	Saint-Médard-Collège François Mauriac <=> Saint-Médard-Villagexpo	s16	-
s17	Le Haillan-Collège Le Haillan <=> Saint-Médard-Mazeau	s17	-
s20	Eysines-Collège Albert Camus <=> Le Taillan-Foin	s20	-
s21	Le Taillan-Lycée Sud Médoc <=> Eysines-Le Grand Caillou	s21	-
s22	Saint-Médard-Lycée Sud Médoc <=> Le Taillan-Tanaïs	s22	-
s24	Carbon-Blanc-Collège Simone Veil <=> Ambès-Fort Lajard	s24	-
s25	Carbon-Blanc-Collège Simone Veil <=> Ambès-Saint Exupéry	s25	-
s26	Carbon-Blanc-Collège Simone Veil <=> Ambès-Fort Lajard	s26	-
s27	Lormont-Allende <=> Ambès-Fort Lajard	s27	-
s28	Lormont-Iris <=> Ambarès-Parabelle	s28	-
s29	Ambarès-Collège Claude Massé <=> Ambarès-Parabelle	s29	-
s30	Lormont-Iris <=> St-Louis-Belle Rive	s30	-
s32	Lormont-Esplanade François Mitterrand <=> Artigues-La Cascade	s32	-
s33	Mérignac-Collège Les Eyquems <=> Mérignac-Rue de Lyon	s33	-
s34	Mérignac-Collège Les Eyquems <=> Mérignac-Bazin	s34	-
s35	Mérignac-Collège Les Eyquems <=> Pessac-Zoo de Pessac	s35	-
s36	Mérignac-Collège Les Eyquems <=> Mérignac-Bellonte	s36	-
s37	Mérignac-Collège de Bourran <=> Mérignac-Vallon	s37	-
s38	Pessac-Collège Noës <=> Pessac-Cartier	s38	-
s39	Pessac-Collège Noës <=> Pessac-Guilbaud	s39	-
s40	Pessac-Collège François Mitterrand <=> Pessac-Lucildo	s40	-
s42	Pessac-Collège Alouette <=> Pessac-Hameaux de l'Alouette	s42	-
s43	Pessac-Collège Alouette <=> Pessac-Domaniales du Golf	s43	-
s44	Pessac-Collège Alouette <=> Pessac-Les Chênes	s44	-
s45	Pessac-Collège Alouette <=> Pessac-Fauvettes	s45	-
s46	Pessac-Collège Alouette <=> Pessac-Cartier	s46	-
s47	Talence-Henri Brisson <=> Talence-Stade Suzon	s47	-
s48	Villenave-Collège Pont de la Maye <=> Villenave-Coin	s48	-
s49	Villenave-Collège Pont de la Maye <=> Villenave-Place Pontac	s49	-
s53	Mérignac-Lycée Daguin <=> Martignas-Les Pins	s53	-
s55	Gradignan-Lycée des Graves <=> Gradignan-Malartic	s55	-
s56	Mérignac-Lycée Daguin <=> Martignas-Souge	s56	-
s57	Bordeaux-Gabriel Fauré <=> Bordeaux-Roger Allo	s57	-
s58	Blanquefort-Lycée du Bâtiment <=> Parempuyre-Landegrand	s58	-
s59	Mérignac-Collège Les Eyquems <=> Mérignac-Campana	s59	-
s60	Mérignac-Collège Les Eyquems <=> Mérignac-Happy Parc	s60	-
s61	Lormont-Allende <=> Ambès-Fort Lajard	s61	-
s62	Lormont-Iris <=> Ambarès-Parabelle	s62	-
s63	Lormont-Iris <=> St-Louis-Belle Rive	s63	-
s64	Mérignac-Lycée Daguin <=> Martignas-Girard	s64	-

=== TBNight ===
The line TBNight functions from 1:30 am to 5:50 am, in order to substitute the whole network between campus, Victoire place and other nightclub districts on Thursdays, Fridays and Saturdays night.

N.	Course	Link	Exploitant
	Gradignan-Village 5 <=> Bordeaux-Base sous marine	TBNight	Keolis

=== Flex' ===
Flex' lines have a route fix which leads in a geographical area. In these zones, there are stops served automatically and stops on request.
There exists 4-day flex' lines, which have a regular frequency, and 7-evening ones which have only 2 departures at 2:00 am and 4:00 am from Quinconces station.
All details here.

N.	Service	Course, zone
flex' Aéro	Mondays to Fridays	Mérignac-Aéroport <=> St-Médard <=> St-Aubin
flex' Artigues	Saturdays	Lormont-Buttinière <=> Artigues-près-Bordeaux-Echangeur du Moulinat <=> zone including 64, 66 and 67 bus stops
flex' Bouliac	Mondays to Saturdays	Bouliac-Centre Commercial <=> Bouliac zone <=> Floirac-Arena
flex' Gare	Mondays to Fridays	Parempuyre, La Gorp, Bassens, Carbon-Blanc and Ambarès train stations <=> each zone around <=> Bec d'Ambès zone
flex' N1	Thursdays to Saturdays (2 bus)	Bordeaux-Quinconces <=> Bordeaux-Ravezies <=> Zones of Blanquefort, Bordeaux-nord, Bruges, Eysines, Parempuyre, Le Taillan
flex' N2	Thursdays to Saturdays (2 bus)	Bordeaux-Quinconces <=> Bordeaux-Barrière du Médoc <=> Zones of Bordeaux-Caudéran, Le Bouscat, Le Haillan, Saint-Aubin, Saint-Médard
flex' N3	Thursdays to Saturdays (2 bus)	Bordeaux-Quinconces <=> Bordeaux-Barrière Judaïque <=> Zones of Bordeaux-Ouest, Mérignac, Martignas
flex' N4	Thursdays to Saturdays (2 bus)	Bordeaux-Quinconces <=> Bordeaux-Barrière de Pessac <=> Zones of Bordeaux-Médoquine, Pessac, Gradignan
flex' N5	Thursdays to Saturdays (2 bus)	Bordeaux-Quinconces <=> Bordeaux-Barrière de Bègles <=> Zones of Bègles, Talence, Villenave
flex' N6	Thursdays to Saturdays (2 bus)	Bordeaux-Quinconces <=> Bordeaux-Galin <=> Zones of Artigues, Bouliac, Cenon, Floirac
flex' N7	Thursdays to Saturdays (2 bus)	Bordeaux-Quinconces <=> Bordeaux-Aristide Briand <=> Zones of Ambarès, Ambès, Bassens, Carbon-Blanc, Lormont, Saint-Louis, Saint-Vincent

=== Shuttles ===
When there are events at Arkéa Arena or at Matmut Atlantique, shuttles are set up by TBM.

Line	Course	Link	Exploitant
Arena	Bordeaux-Porte de Bourgogne <=> Floirac-Arkéa Arena	Arena	Keolis
Stade	Cenon-Gare <=> Bordeaux-Parc des Expositions-Stade Matmut Atlantique	Stade	Keolis

=== Relais ===
To replace tram service in maintenance, there are Relais bus line for each tramway line.

Line	Course	Link	Exploitant
Bus A	Same as Tramway A course	A	-
Bus B	Same as Tramway B course	B	-
Bus C	Same as Tramway C course	C	-
Bus D	Same as Tramway D course	D	-

== See also ==
- Transports Bordeaux Métropole
- Bordeaux Tramway
