= Lormont =

Lormont Larmont (Occitan)
- Commune
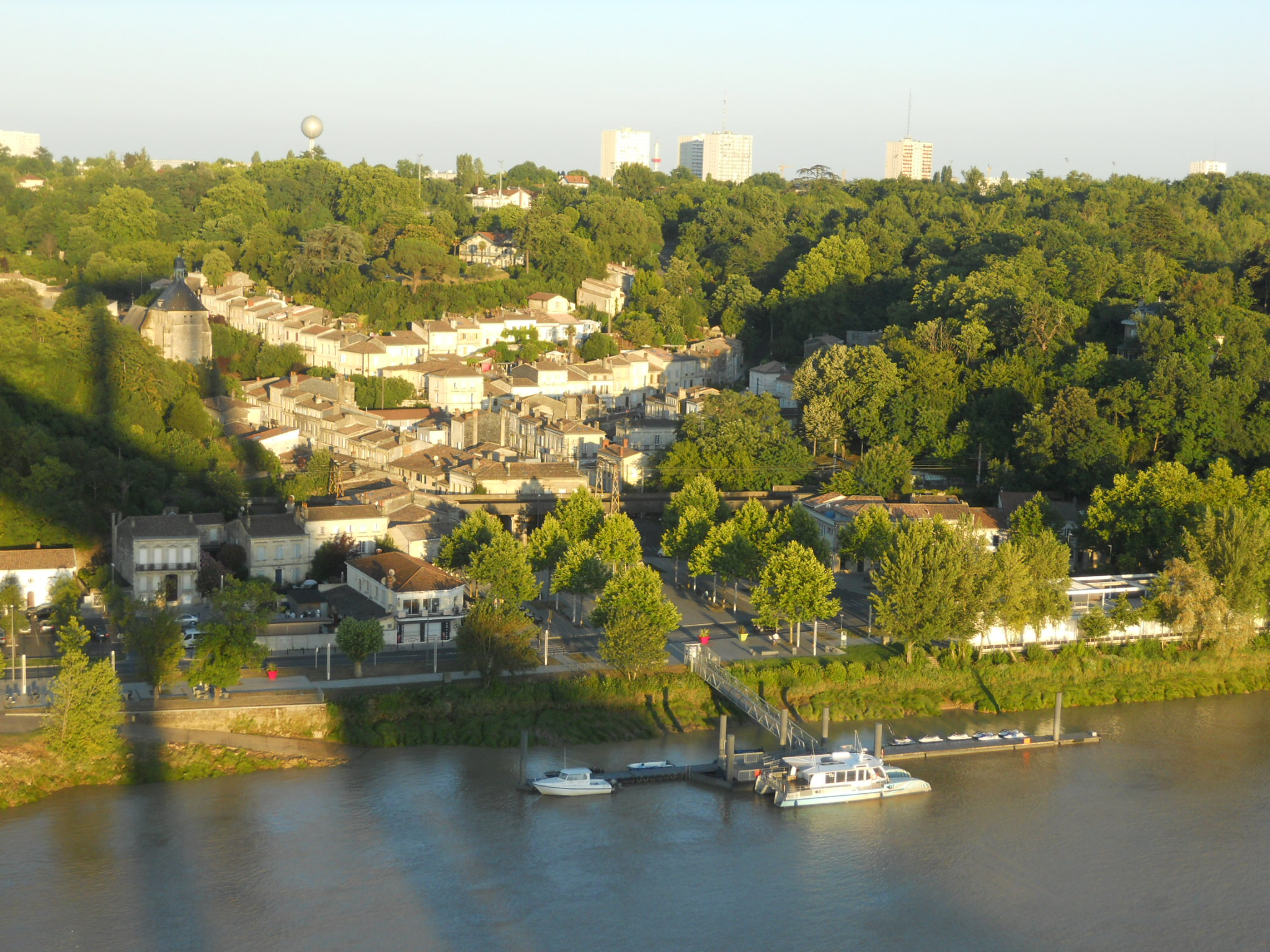
- The old town along the Garonne

- Coat of arms
- Location of Lormont
- Location within France Location within Nouvelle-Aquitaine
- Coordinates: 44°52′45″N 0°31′18″W
- Country: France
- Region: Nouvelle-Aquitaine
- Department: Gironde
- Arrondissement: Bordeaux
- Canton: Lormont
- Intercommunality: Bordeaux Métropole

Government
  - Mayor (2020–2026): Jean Touzeau
- Area^{1}: 7.36 km^{2} (2.84 sq mi)
- Elevation: 50 m (160 ft)
- Highest elevation: 63 m (207 ft)
- Lowest elevation: 2 m (6.6 ft)
- Population (2023): 25,769
  - Density: 3,500/km^{2} (9,070/sq mi)
- Time zone: UTC+01:00 (CET)
  - Summer (DST): UTC+02:00 (CEST)
- INSEE/Postal code: 33249 /33310
- ^{1} French Land Register data, which excludes lakes, ponds, glaciers > 1 km^{2} (0.386 sq mi or 247 acres) and river estuaries.

Lormont (French pronunciation: [lɔʁmɔ̃]; Occitan: Larmont, [ˈlaɾmun]) is a commune in the Gironde department, Nouvelle-Aquitaine, southwestern France. It is a suburb of the city of Bordeaux and is adjacent to it on the northeast. Thus, it is a member of the intercommunality Bordeaux Métropole.

== Etymology ==
The name Lormont comes from "Laureamontus" or "Laureomonte". The "laurier" (laurel) was a wood sacred to the Gauls. For the Romans it symbolized glory and the god Apollo. The Celts considered it to be a symbol of immortality. Until the revolution, Lormont was spelled 'Lormon' without t.

== Geography ==
Lormont is located on the right bank of the river Garonne, 6 km north and downstream of Bordeaux. It has long been a small town in the Bordeaux area until its entry into the CUB on 1 January 1968. It is a popular location due to different means of transport and roads present: once being accessible by gondolas and a national train station, the Pont d'Aquitaine and the tram. The town has 735 hectares.

Lormont can be divided into several major areas:

- Carriet: located north of the town, near Bassens, it is surrounded by major access roads. Located in the area is the council pool, new educational facilities and a mixed housing renewal. The site is very hilly, which offer views on the Garonne and Bordeaux. Carriet is called "Garden City".
- Génicart: Initial period of construction was in the 1970s on the "plateau". Mainly composed of buildings associated with Urbanisation Priority Zones (ZUP) and is now a booming urban renewal.
- Le Bourg: Better known as the 'village' it is located towards the banks of the river. The houses located in this area are of a vintage era from where once you would find docks and naval shipyards which is now home to the Port Autonome of Bordeaux.
- Le Grand Tressan: Domaine du Manoir: located east of the city, this neighborhood consists of individual residences bordering the cities of Sainte-Eulalie, Yvrac, Artigues-près-Bordeaux and Carbon-Blanc.
- Les Iris-Lissandre: The district Iris is located along the Garonne and Génicart. Lissandre contains a large Hermitage Park which is a large natural park with an area of 30 hectares. The castle of Iris and Iris Farm offers enjoyable moments of discovery.
- La Ramade: Currently under construction, the new district will open its doors to many people benefiting from new housing.

Access can be made by the Rocade A630: Exits 2 (Lormont, Carbon Blanc, Bassens, Zone portuaire) 3 (Vieux Lormont) 26 (Artigues Moulinat, Yvrac, Quatre Pavillons) 27 (Lormont, Carbon Blanc)

Lormont lies in a floodplain in the extension area of the 'Entre – Deux – Mers', to confluence the two valleys of the Dordogne and Garonne, this space is made up of recent estuarine sediments. Above 60 meters elevation, the soil consists of a limestone plateau.

The town is bordered by the Garonne and has two streams channelled, the Pimpin and the Garosses, which form an estey. Geothermal drilling was carried out in Génicart and supplies thermal water to a Thermo center in located in the Hermitage Park. Work begun in January 2010 to build a complex of about 7000m^{2}.

Lormont is located on two hills framing a narrow valley, 'Cape deu Tureu' in the north and 'Roqua' to the south. Cycling enthusiasts challenge the steep climb of the côte du Pimpin and avenue des champs. The maximum altitude recorded in Lormont is 63 meters.

== History ==
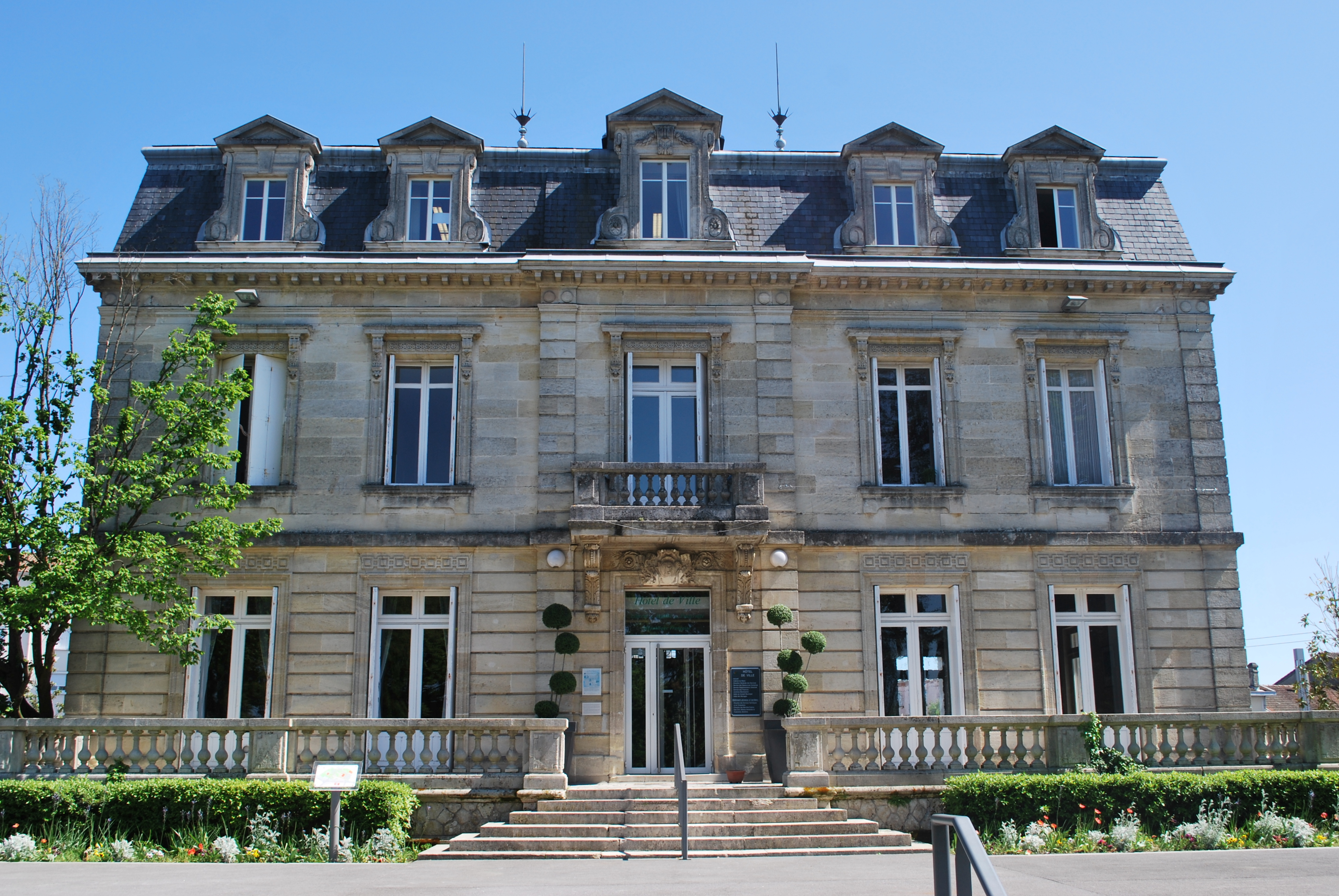
The Hôtel de Ville

Located on the outskirts of Bordeaux, Lormont has always been a prosperous village, fishing port, and a place for the transit of goods and people.

In 778, Charlemagne and Roland founded the Church of St. Martin. Around the year 1000, the Dukes of Aquitaine built the first château de Lormont where Eleanor of Aquitaine stayed. The northern half of Lormont in 1152 became a sauveté (Lordship) of the Archbishops and would have accommodated the princes of England, while the other half is establishing itself dependent provost of Bordeaux.

In 1308, Pope Clement V resided at the château de Lormont where Richard II was born, the son of the "Black Prince" in 1367. The town prospered and lived well with their vineyards, fishing and ferrying passenger from the port. Nevertheless, famine, pestilence and invasion of a Spanish fleet devastated the city. In 1570, Protestants burnt the Village, the church and the Hermitage.

In 1751, the Intendant Tourny opened the road to Paris. Lormont became one of the most important communities of Bordeaux. The first French commercial steamboat called the "Garonne" was built in August 1818 by Chaigneau. They then employed 1,000 workers and built 500 within a century to become the "chantiers de la Garonne" in 1882. After the lines of the TER were opened, in 1901, Lormont played host to the first tramway at the place du port which allowed the Bordelais discover the city.

By the 19th century, the Bordelais used to travel to Lormont for a day of leisure on Sunday afternoons.

The Hôtel de Ville was built as a private residence and completed in 1888.

During the 1960s Lormont was subject to a grand industrialisation which doubled the size of the population. This decade saw the construction of the large housing blocks in the Carriet Génicart and the '4 Pavilions' shopping centre, the inauguration of the Pont d'Aquitaine, the opening of school, sports, cultural and associative infrastructure. Large industries like Siemens and Ricard also took up residency in the area.

== Coat of arms ==
The coat of arms of the city was selected in January 1969 following a competition and validated by the City Council, June 6, 1969. The form is of an English styled shield which recalls the ties that bound England and Lormont.

== Administration ==
The current mayor is Jean Touzeau, in office since 1995 and re-elected in 2020. The municipal council of the city is composed of 35 members including the mayor, 10 deputies, 3 community advisors, 17 municipal councilors and 4 councilors elected from the opposition.

=== List of mayors of Lormont ===
- 1790–1792 : Pierre Chaigneau
- 1792–1795 : Adrien Lorcher
- 1795–1799 : Mathurin Musset
- 1799–1815 : Pierre Dejaneau
- 1815–1821 : Paul Larrat
- 1821–1829 : Arnaud Chaigneau
- 1829–1831 : Arnaud Chaigneau Jr.
- 1831–1857 : Pierre Bichon
- 1857–1869 : Hyppolyte Gourdon
- 1869–1874 : Charles Chaigneau
- 1874–1878 : Arnaud Frédéric Bichon
- 1878–1881 : Ernest Bazille
- 1881–1887 : Jacques Gelot
- 1887–1894 : Pierre Barrailley
- 1895–1905 : Georges Duret
- 1905–1912 : André Syllas Mellon
- 1912–1925 : Hilaire Bachellerie
- 1925–1929 : Ernest Laloue
- 1929–1945 : René Gaudin
- 1945–1947 : André Dupin
- 1945–1965 : Paul Prévost Sansac de Traversay
- 1965–1995 : Maurice Belleaud
- 1995– : Jean Touzeau

=== International relations ===
Lormon is twinned with:

- Castelldefels (Spain) since 1988

=== Urban policy ===
On 21 November 2006, Lormont joined the Great Cities Project to improve the supply of equipment and housing, to promote interactions between neighborhoods and conurbation.

The district of Carriet will develop:

- The demolition of 375 social housing;
- The construction of 364 social housing;
- The creation of 2 District Centers (nursery and elementary schools, multi-sports centre, childcare center, public parks);
- Reworking of landscape/public gardens;

The district of Génicart will develop:

- The demolition of 897 social homes;
- The construction of 878 social housing;
- The construction of a cultural hub at Bois Fleuri (library, city archives, multi-purpose room);
- Reprocessing of public spaces for better road sharing and to encourage cross-traffic from the 3 tram stops;

The centre of the city will develop:

- The rehabilitation of the esplanade François Mitterrand with landscape and urban spaces;
- The establishment of a service center in the château Génicart containing several communal facilities;
- The establishment of further commercial activities in the district.

These projects, which accompanies the layout of the recently installed Bordeaux Tramway Line A on the avenue de la Libération, should basically modify the living conditions of the plateau.

== Population ==
The inhabitants are called Lormontais in French.

Historical population

Year	Pop.	±% p.a.
1793	1,888	—
1800	1,423	−3.96%
1806	1,565	+1.60%
1821	1,598	+0.14%
1831	1,883	+1.65%
1836	2,147	+2.66%
1841	2,383	+2.11%
1846	2,529	+1.20%
1851	2,900	+2.78%
1856	2,760	−0.98%
1861	2,921	+1.14%
1866	2,962	+0.28%
1872	2,762	−1.16%
1876	2,858	+0.86%
1881	2,863	+0.03%
1886	3,138	+1.85%
1891	3,236	+0.62%
1896	3,205	−0.19%
1901	3,072	−0.84%

Year	Pop.	±% p.a.
1906	3,184	+0.72%
1911	3,303	+0.74%
1921	4,029	+2.01%
1926	4,046	+0.08%
1931	4,248	+0.98%
1936	4,109	−0.66%
1946	4,268	+0.38%
1954	5,196	+2.49%
1962	5,976	+1.76%
1968	10,774	+10.32%
1975	18,719	+8.21%
1982	20,910	+1.59%
1990	21,591	+0.40%
1999	21,343	−0.13%
2007	20,636	−0.42%
2012	20,740	+0.10%
2017	23,538	+2.56%
2023	25,769	+1.52%

Source: EHESS and INSEE (1968-2023)

== Economy ==
The city's economic activity revolves around 3 main axes:

- Trade Points: The shopping centers of the 4 Pavillons, Génicart and Carriet.
- Cluster based logistics including port operations with the Port of Carriet and regional distribution platforms.
- 882 small businesses, industrial and commercial facilities located in the city.

The industrial zones of the 4 Pavillons (26.5 ha), La Gardette (18 ha) and Lissandre (15 ha) account for nearly 59.5 hectares dedicated to businesses.

== Sites and Monuments ==
=== The Château of Lormont (Black Prince/Archbishops) ===
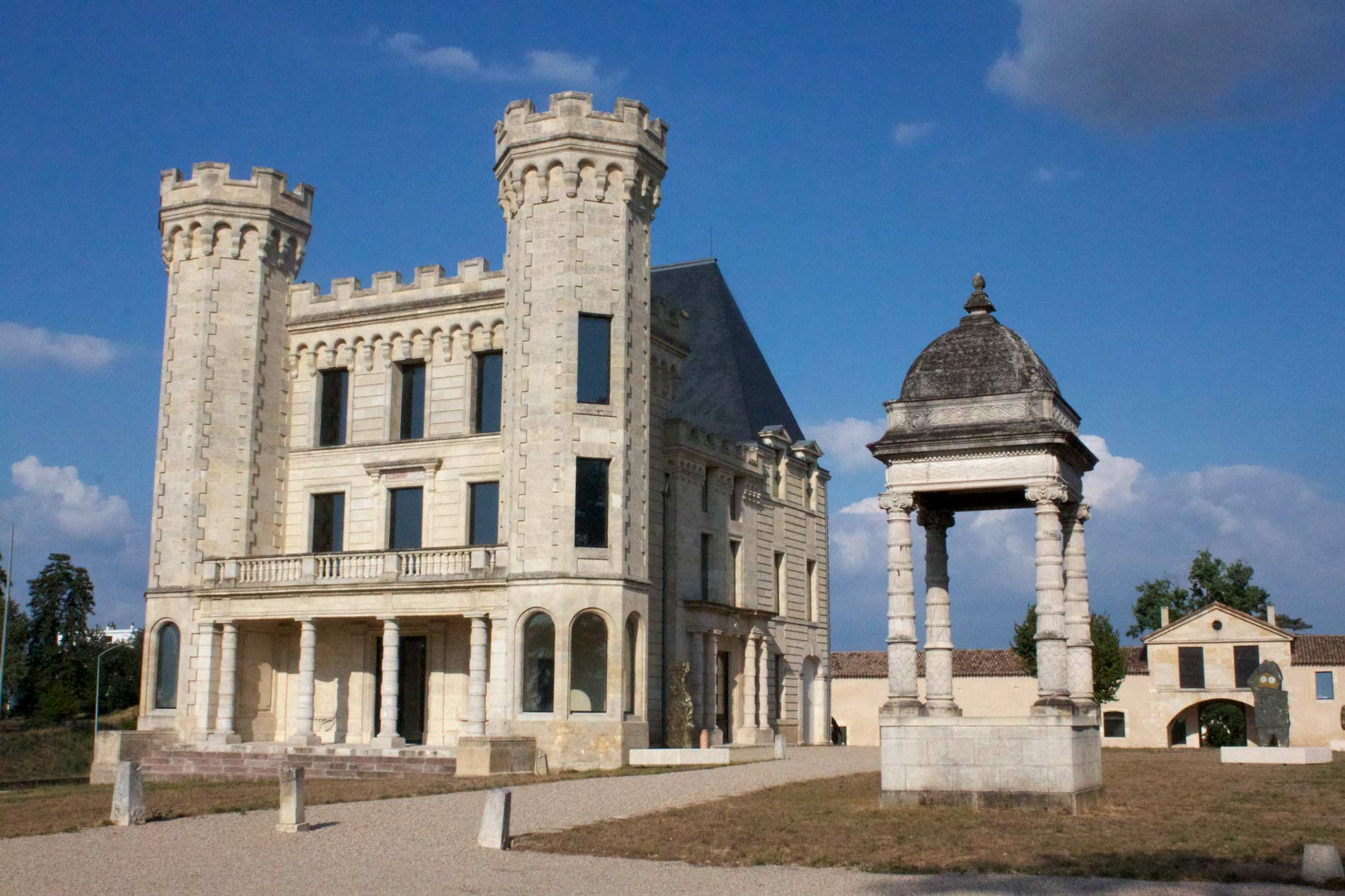
Château du Prince Noir

Built around 1060, the castle of Lormont probably saw Eleanor of Aquitaine stay here during her marriage to King Louis VII of France. The Prince of Aquitaine, also known as the Black Prince lived there. The archbishops of Bordeaux possessed the château in the 14th century. In 1453, negotiations to end the Hundred Years War also took place there. After having been successively destroyed and rebuilt, notably in 1626 by architect Henry Roche for the Cardinal Francis d'Escoubleau of Sourdis then to his brother Henri de Sourdis. The castle became national property in 1789.

Today the castle is private property. After a major renovation it was converted to house offices and also a restaurant.

=== The Château du Bois Fleuri ===
Built around 1880, the Chateau du Bois Fleuri was owned by a wine merchant named Mr. Jouin. This monument of a neo-Gothic castle is inspired by the Neuschwanstein Castle in Bavaria (Germany), of which was the inspiration for Walt Disney to create Sleeping Beauty's castle in 1959.

=== The Château Génicart ===
Built in a vineyard around 1854, Château Génicart was used to help house the army of the United States with 250 barracks erected in the gardens between 1917 and 1919. Today located in the heart of Lormont, it is the local trade hub.

=== The Château des Iris ===
In 1864, Mrs Blanc de Manville decided to build the castle of Iris. This is a tribute to the French flag by choosing colors that adorn it: slate blue, the white stone and red brick. During World War II, the castle of Iris was occupied by the Germans and in 1969 the building was sold to the Urban Community of Bordeaux by Poliet & Chausson, who were a cement works, which was located near the damaged building.

=== Château des Lauriers ===
In 1860, the castle was constructed by a Mr. Gradis, who built the château around large gardens and parks. Today the building. Today, it houses the national museum of health insurance, which presents the history and values of the French social security. Educational workshops. Audio guide. Free guided tour. website: www.musee-insurance maladie.com: Tel. : 05 56 06 19 88

=== Church of Saint Martin ===
The Church of St. Martin stands has stood in the same place since 1294. The patron saint of the parish, owes its name to Martin of Tours. In 1451, then in ruins, it was consecrated by the archbishop Pey Berland, which offered the reconstruction once the Hundred Years War was over. After about 20 years of renovation, it is classified today as a historic monument.

=== Church Saint Esprit ===
The Church was in built in Carriet in 1966. Father Puyo, pastor of St. Martin oversaw the construction of this church with a cubic area of 400m^{2}.

=== Communal laundry house ===
During the nineteenth century many communal laundries began to appear. They remained for many years an important and central meeting location, where the exchange of local information and gossip were traded. In 1880, the first water system to provide drinkable water was created. Today, five laundries still remain: les lavoirs de Lissandre, de Gelot, de la République, de Carriet and de Blanchereau.

=== Pont d'Aquitaine (bridge) ===
After many proposals to link the two banks of the Garonne, it was on 20 May 1960 that the work for the Pont d'Aquitaine started. It provides a connection to the motorway from Paris and also services the port and industrial areas of Ambés and Bassens. Opened on 6 May 1967 by Jacques Chaban-Delmas, the bridge rises to almost 53 meters in height. It took stacks of 105 meters and nearly 12,000 km of cable to suspend the bridge.

=== Hermitage Park ===
With nearly 30 acres, Hermitage park is located on the former site of the cement works, Poliet & Chausson. The park takes its name to an old chapel that was once located on the hillside. The park's highest point is 63 meters, with a network of trails allowing hikers to enjoy the views offered by the park on the Garonne and Bordeaux.

=== Trails ===
There are several well worn trails in the area offering hikers many different choices to undertake. There are walks that give the chance to discover the natural landscapes of the right bank of the river, while there are two walks that enable to hiker to explore the city.

== Public Transport ==
=== TBC Network ===
- Tramway

Mérignac Centre ↔ La Gardette-Bassens-Carbon-Blanc / Floirac Dravemont

- Bus Network

As of February 22, 2010

Liane	7		Les Aubiers <=> Ambarès-et-Lagrave-Parabelle
Line	27		Buttinière <=> Stalingrad
Corol	32		Bouliac-Commercial Centre <=> Bassins à flot
Citéis	40		Cenon-Beausite or Lormont-Lauriers <=> Buttinière
Flexo	50	Ambarès (Night)	Stalingrad <=> Ambarès-et-Lagrave-serving signalled stops of Bec d'Ambès
Line	64		Buttinière <=> Artigues-près-Bordeaux-Fontderode
Line	67		Buttinière => Artigues-près-Bordeaux-Intercommunal Cemetery => Buttinière
Flexo	68	Artigues (Saturday)	Buttinière <=> Artigues-près-Bordeaux-Interchange Moulinat then stops including flexo lines 64 and 67
Line	90		Bassens-La Chênaie <=> Carbon-Blanc-La Mouline or Saint-Louis-de-Montferrand-Belle Rive
Line	91		Stalingrad <=> Ambès-Escarraguel
Line	92		Stalingrad <=> Ambès-Escarraguel or -Fort Lajard
Line	93		Lycée de Lormont <=> Ambès-Fort Lajard
Line	94		(Highschool) Lycée de Lormont <=> Ambarès-et-Lagrave-Parabelle

=== Trans Gironde Network ===
201	Buttinière <=> Blaye-Tourist Office
202	Buttinière or Blaye-Tourist Office <=> Blaye-Tourist Office or Saint-Ciers-sur-Gironde-Church or Pleine-Selve-Chez Pidoux
301	Buttinière <=> Sante-Eulalie-Argentière or Izon-Le Pin or Libourne-Gare Routière (Train Station)
302	Buttinière <=> Libourne-Gare Routière (Train Station)
303	Buttinière <=> Beychac-et-Caillaud-Mairie

== Personalities ==
- Richard II of England
- Lamine Diatta
- Christophe Dugarry
- Miguel Pacios

== See also ==
- Communes of the Gironde department
