= Gambetta tram stop =

Tram stop in Bordeaux, France

Gambetta
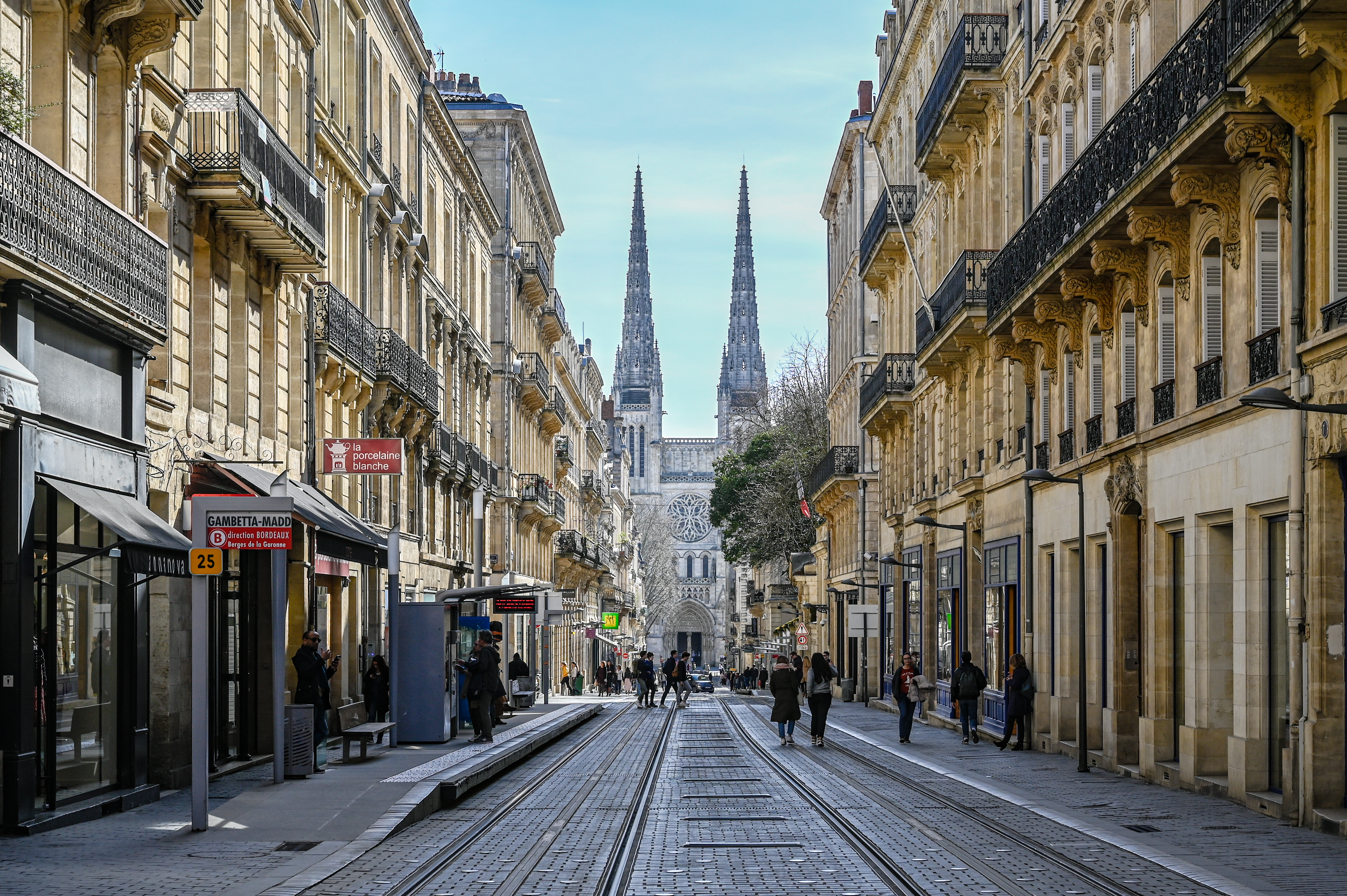

General information
- Location: Bordeaux; France
- Coordinates: 44°50′28″N 0°34′42″W
- Line: Line B

Construction
- Architect: Elizabeth de Portzamparc

History
- Opened: 15 May 2004

Services
Preceding station	Bordeaux tramway	Following station
Hôtel de Ville towards France Alouette or Pessac Centre	Line B	Grand Théâtre towards Berges de la Garonne
Location
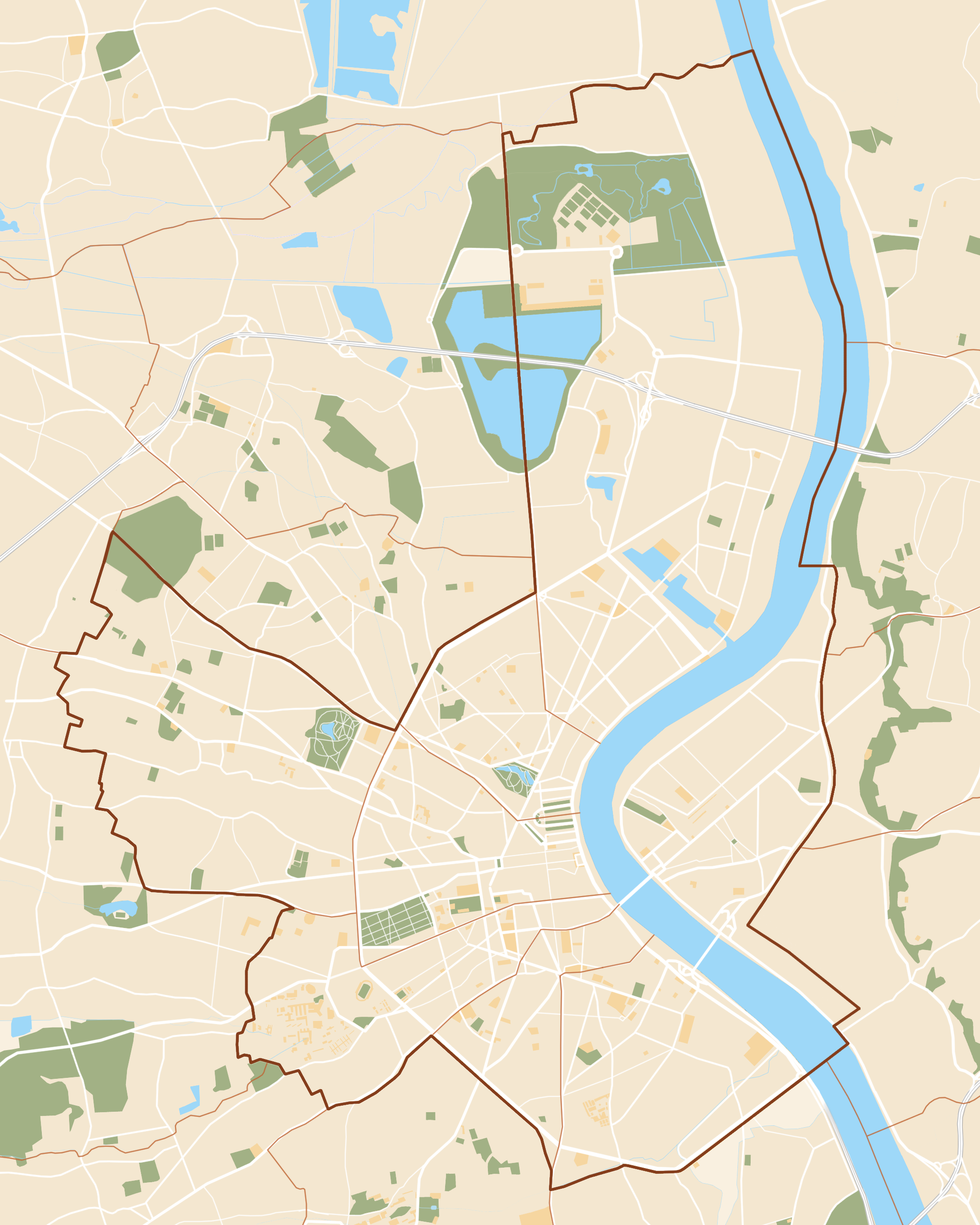
- Location within Bordeaux Location within Nouvelle-Aquitaine

Gambetta tram stop is located on line of the tramway de Bordeaux.

== Situation ==
The station is in Bordeaux on Rue Vital Carles, near the corner with Rue de la Porte Dijeaux.

== Interchanges ==
=== TBM bus network ===
Junction with the Place Gambetta, where there are the following bus lines :

N.	Course	Link
1	Bordeaux-Gare Saint Jean <=> Mérignac-Centre.	1
2	Bordeaux-Quinconces <=> Le Taillan-La Boétie	2
3	Bordeaux-Quinconces <=> Saint-Médard-Issac, -Gare routière or Saint-Aubin-Villepreux	3
4	Bordeaux-Bassins à Flots <=> Pessac-Magonty or -Cap de Bos	4
12	Bordeaux-Palais de Justice <=> Eysines-Hippodrome	12
15	Bordeaux-Centre commercial du Lac or Bruges-Camping international <=> Villenave-Courréjean or -Pont de la Maye	15
16	Bouliac-Centre commercial <=> Mérignac-Les Pins	16

=== Trans Gironde Network ===
N.	Course	Link
601	Gare Saint-Jean ou Quinconces <=> Saint-Jean-d'Illac-Le Las ou Lège-Cap-Ferret -Salle des Sports ou -La Pointe	Schedule

== Close by ==
- Cours de l'Intendance
- Place Gambetta

== See also ==
- TBM
- Tramway de Bordeaux
