= Ambarès-et-Lagrave =

- Commune
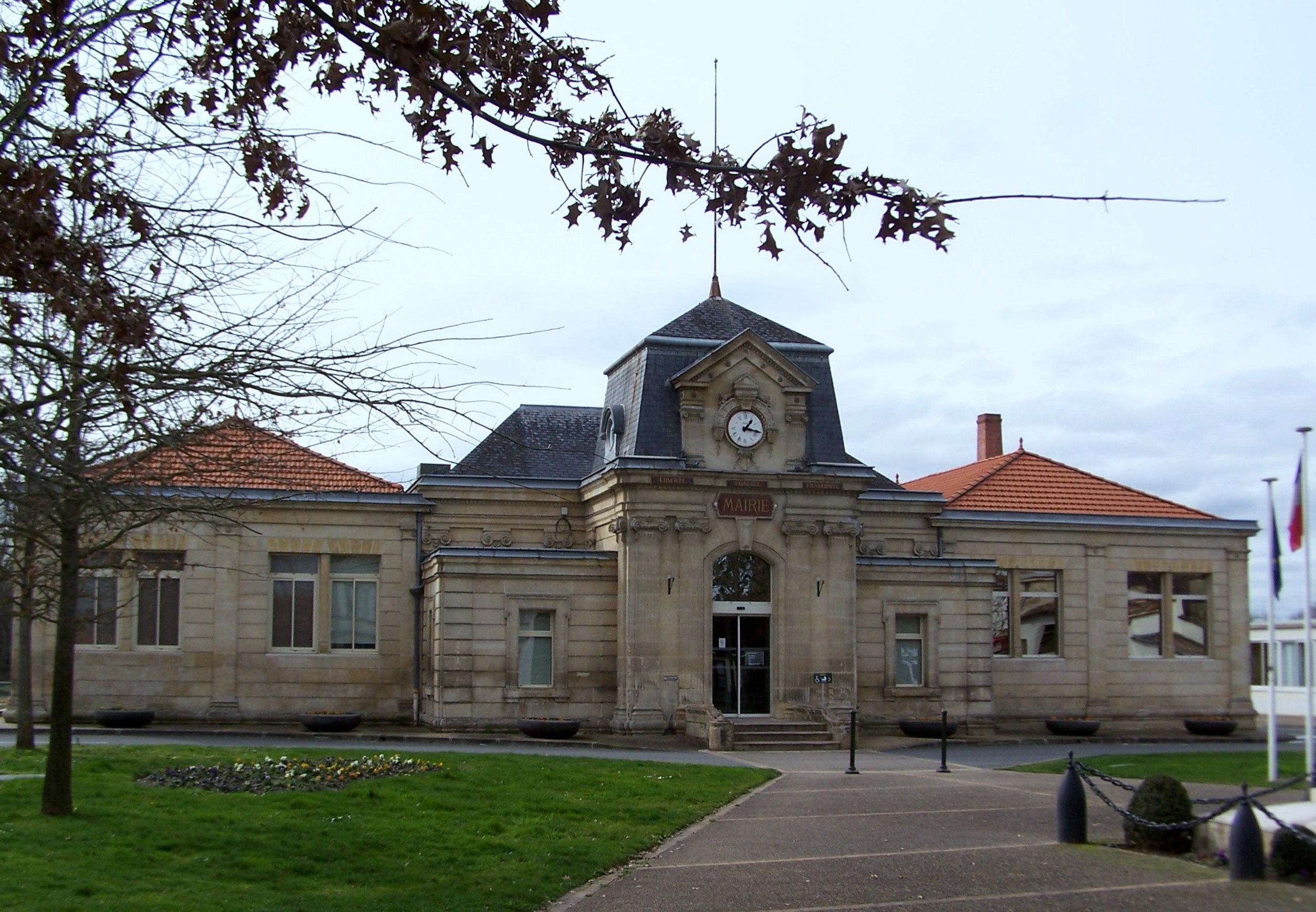
- The Town Hall

- Coat of arms
- Location of Ambarès-et-Lagrave
- Location within France Location within Nouvelle-Aquitaine
- Coordinates: 44°55′33″N 0°29′07″W
- Country: France
- Region: Nouvelle-Aquitaine
- Department: Gironde
- Arrondissement: Bordeaux
- Canton: La Presqu'île
- Intercommunality: Bordeaux Métropole

Government
  - Mayor (2020–2026): Nordine Guendez
- Area^{1}: 24.76 km^{2} (9.56 sq mi)
- Elevation: 7 m (23 ft)
- Highest elevation: 34 m (112 ft)
- Lowest elevation: 0 m (0 ft)
- Population (2023): 17,644
  - Density: 712.6/km^{2} (1,846/sq mi)
- Time zone: UTC+01:00 (CET)
  - Summer (DST): UTC+02:00 (CEST)
- INSEE/Postal code: 33003 /33440
- ^{1} French Land Register data, which excludes lakes, ponds, glaciers > 1 km^{2} (0.386 sq mi or 247 acres) and river estuaries.

Ambarès-et-Lagrave (French pronunciation: [ɑ̃baʁɛs e laɡʁav]; Ambarés e La Grava in Gascon dialect) is a commune in the Gironde department in the Nouvelle-Aquitaine region of southwestern France. Twinned with Midsomer Norton in the BANES area of the United Kingdom.

== Geography ==
Ambarès-et-Lagrave is part of the Bordeaux urban area located to the north of the Bordeaux conurbation between the Garonne and Dordogne. The A10 autoroute passes down the eastern side of the commune from north to south with Exit 42 → Ambarès-et-Lagrave, Saint-Loubès in the commune. The commune is mostly urban with small areas of forest in the north and south and farmland in the west and north.

Ambarès-et-Lagrave is part of the Bordeaux Métropole.

=== Transport ===
TER Aquitaine

The commune is served by two railway stations: the Grave-d'Ambarès station and La Gorp station which have regular links with Bordeaux.

TBC Network

Liane	7		Les Aubiers ⇔ Ambarès-et-Lagrave-Parabelle
Flexo	49	Ambares (Mon-Sat)	Ambarès-et-Lagrave-Collège C. Massé ⇔ Ambarès-et-Lagrave-La Gorp then the Flexo zone of Ambarès
Flexo	50	Ambarès (Soirée)	Stalingrad ⇔ Ambarès-et-Lagrave-Europe then serves on demand stops to Bec d'Ambès
Line	90		Bassens-La Chênaie ⇔ Carbon-Blanc-La Mouline or Saint-Louis-de-Montferrand-Belle Rive
Line	92		Stalingrad ⇔ Ambès-Escarraguel or -Fort Lajard
Line	93	Schooldays only	Lycée de Lormont ⇔ Ambès-Fort Lajard
Line	94	Schooldays only	Lycée de Lormont ⇔ Ambarès-et-Lagrave-Parabelle
Line	95	Schooldays only	Ambarès-et-Lagrave-Collège Massé ⇔ Ambarès-et-Lagrave-Parabelle
Line	96	Schooldays only	Lycée de Lormont ⇔ Saint-Louis-de-Montferrand-Belle Rive

Trans Gironde Network

201	Buttinière ⇔ Blaye-Tourist Office
202	Buttinière or Blaye-Tourist Office ⇔ Blaye-Tourist Office or Saint-Ciers-sur-Gironde-Église or Pleine-Selve-Chez Pidoux
301	Buttinière ⇔ Sante-Eulalie-Argentière or Izon-Le Pin or Libourne-Gare Routière

== History ==
In the 12th century the city of Ambarès belonged to a vast feudal domain comprising a large part of the marshes of Entre-deux-Mers (Between two seas). Later this area became the Barony of Montferrand.

The ancient parish of Ambarès was almost entirely under the jurisdiction of the Lords of Gua who levied tithes from the 15th century.

The Lagrave district was attached to the commune of Ambarès in 1818.

=== Heraldry ===
Arms of Ambarès-et-Lagrave	Blazon: Azure, a baton sinister Argent cabled Sable; at dexter chief a conical tower Argent masoned sable port the same; at middle chief a lion contourned of Or; at sinister base a domed castle flanked by two towers embattled of three pieces, all of Argent masoned in sable, port and windows the same; at fesse point a key of Or, with bow in chief and bit to sinister debruised by another key the same in fesse bow to dexter and bit to chief.

== Administration ==
List of Successive Mayors

From	To	Name	Party
1853		Antoine François Jules Eymond	
2001	2004	Henri Houdebert	PS
2004	2020	Michel Héritié	PS
2020	2026	Nordine Guendez	

=== Twinning ===
Ambarès-et-Lagrave has twinning associations with:

- Kelheim (Bavaria, Germany) since 1989.
- (United Kingdom) Midsomer Norton (Somerset, UK) since 1985.

== Demography ==
The inhabitants of the commune are known as Ambarésiens or Ambarésiennes in French. The population of Ambarès-et-Lagrave has more than doubled between 1962 and 1999. This significant increase in the population is probably due to its proximity to the city of Bordeaux.

Historical population

Year	Pop.	±% p.a.
1793	2,178	—
1800	2,350	+1.09%
1806	1,676	−5.48%
1821	2,132	+1.62%
1831	2,299	+0.76%
1836	2,274	−0.22%
1841	2,240	−0.30%
1846	2,438	+1.71%
1851	2,701	+2.07%
1856	2,666	−0.26%
1861	2,666	+0.00%
1866	2,788	+0.90%
1872	2,782	−0.04%
1876	2,872	+0.80%
1881	3,031	+1.08%
1886	3,156	+0.81%
1891	3,247	+0.57%
1896	3,200	−0.29%
1901	3,269	+0.43%

Year	Pop.	±% p.a.
1906	3,187	−0.51%
1911	3,163	−0.15%
1921	3,224	+0.19%
1926	3,425	+1.22%
1931	3,632	+1.18%
1936	3,805	+0.93%
1946	3,733	−0.19%
1954	4,295	+1.77%
1962	5,831	+3.90%
1968	7,134	+3.42%
1975	7,622	+0.95%
1982	8,105	+0.88%
1990	10,195	+2.91%
1999	11,206	+1.06%
2007	12,963	+1.84%
2012	14,112	+1.71%
2017	16,344	+2.98%
2023	17,644	+1.28%

Source: EHESS and INSEE

== Economy ==
Although the tertiary sector (services) is predominant in Ambarès-et-Lagrave, the town also has many jobs in industry (secondary sector).

- Allocation of Workers (2009, INSEE):

Sector	Ambarès-et-Lagrave (2009)	All France (2009)
Agriculture (primary)	1.6%	1.2%
Industry (secondary)	27.7%	21.0%
Services (tertiary)	70.6%	77.8%

Unemployment rate: 9.8% (2009, INSEE)

== Culture and heritage ==
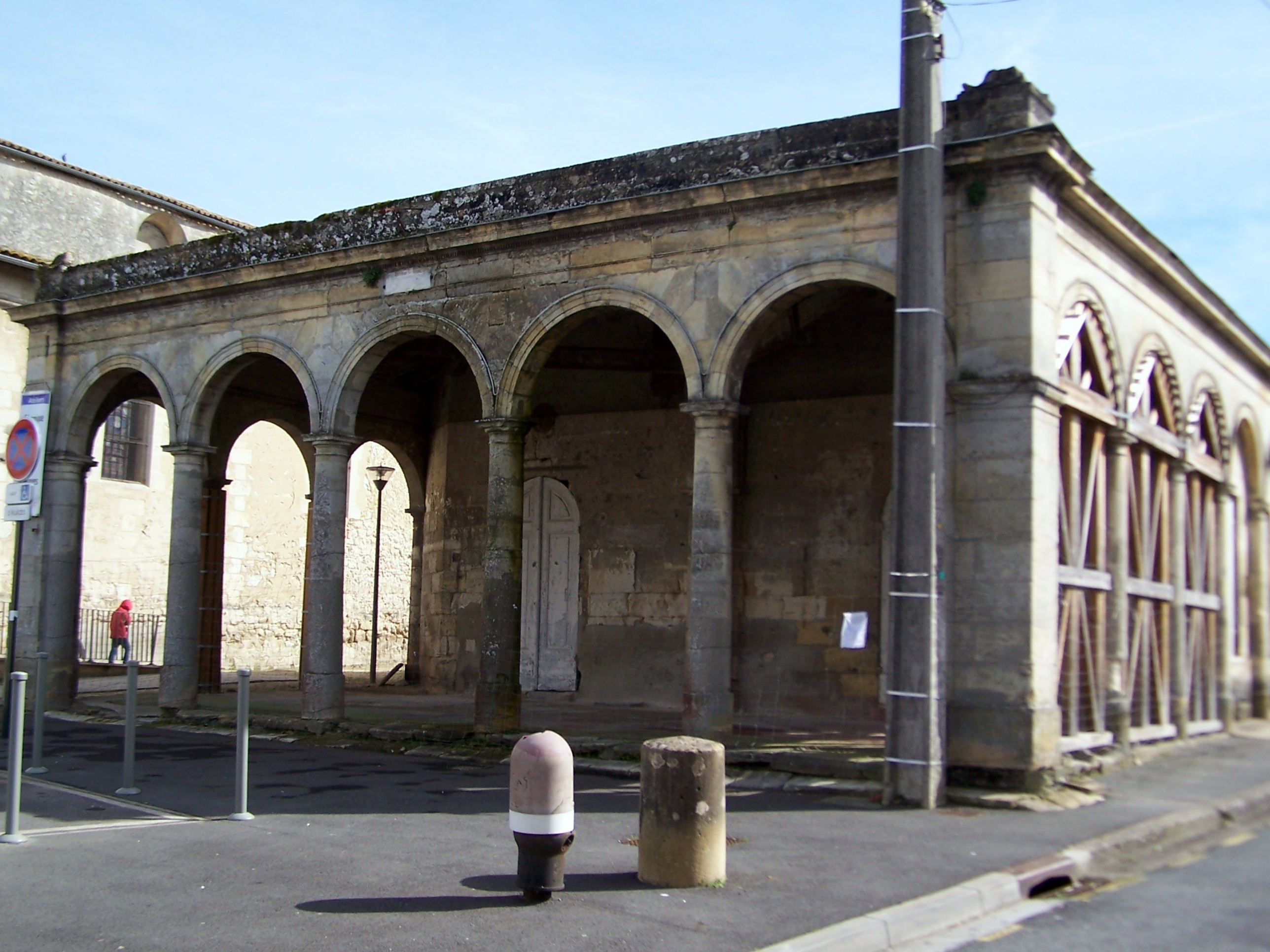
The Covered Market

=== Civil heritage ===
The commune has many buildings and structures that are registered as historical monuments:

- A Lavoir (Public Laundry) at La Gorp (1893)
- The Château Beauséjour (19th century) was probably rebuilt in the middle of the 19th century but as farm buildings it may be older. The old house was listed as Pouyau on the Belleyme map and in the old Land Registry.
- The Château du Tillac (17th century) was the noble house of the Joly de Bonneau family. It was probably built in the 17th century perhaps at the site of an old house as it is located on one of the peaks at the end the peninsula.
- The Chauvette House at 10 Rue de la Commanderie des Templiers (18th century)
- A House at 27 Rue Edmond-Faulat (20th century)
- A House at 6-8 Rue Edmond-Faulat (19th century)
- The Charron House at 9 Rue Edmond-Faulat (17th century)
- The Château de Formont (19th century) was a former noble house on one of the peaks of the end of the peninsula and is shown on the Belleyme map. The building may have been built in the early 18th century as indicated by the date it bore of 1723 which is now destroyed.
- The Café Duthil at 11 Avenue de la Gare (19th century)
- A House at 7 Rue Guillaume-Peychaud (18th century)
- The Château du Gua (1866) was a former noble house of the Laroque, Donissan, and Pineau families. It was known early in the 15th century and mentioned on the Belleyme map. The house was completely destroyed and rebuilt in 1866.
- The Le Gaès Farmhouse at 22 Avenue de la Libération (18th century)
- The Rousseau House at 61 Avenue de la Libération (18th century)
- A Wine Warehouse at 69 bis Avenue de la Libération (1837)
- The former Covered Market / Town Hall at the Place du Maréchal-Leclerc (1836)
- The Château Saint-Denis (17th century) was perhaps an ancient noble house but not listed as such on the Belleyme map. Probably built in the 17th century for the Pineau family according to a U-shaped plan (as amended). It was the property of the actor Louis Jouvet in 1930.
- The Château Peychaud (17th century) was a lordship documented since the 16th century belonging to the Fayet family. The old castle was probably rebuilt in 1680 and in the early 18th century when it included the current building flanked to the north by agricultural areas.
- The Château Bellevue (19th century) was probably rebuilt in the middle of the 19th century on the site of a former U-shaped house mentioned as Puymanot on the Belleyme map and the old Land Registry. It has been converted into a school since 1980.
- The Château Durandeau (19th century) was a former noble house of the Rishon family shown on the Belleyme map. The building may have been built in the 17th century and rebuilt in the 18th century then extensively restored in the middle of the 19th century.
- The Le Grain House at 32 Avenue du Roy (18th century)
- The Beaujet House at 83 Avenue du Roy (18th century)
- The Town Hall / School at Place de la Victoire (19th century)
- The War Memorial at Place de la Victoire (1921)
- A Monumental Column at Rue de la Vierge (1885)
- Mills (18th century)
- Winemakers' Huts (19th-20th century)
- Houses, Manors, and Farms (18th-20th century)
- Montferrand Marsh (17th century)

=== Religious heritage ===
The commune has several religious sites that are registered as historical monuments:

- The Parish Church of Saint Pierre (11th century) The church contains a large number of items that are registered as historical objects.
- The Chapel of Saint Denis (19th century)
- The Cemetery at Rue Victor-Hugo (19th century)
- The Presbytery at 3 Rue Victor-Hugo (18th century)
- The former Church of the Templars Notre-Dame-de-la-Grave at Rue de la Vierge (12th century)
- Monumental Crosses (19th century)

=== Picture Gallery ===
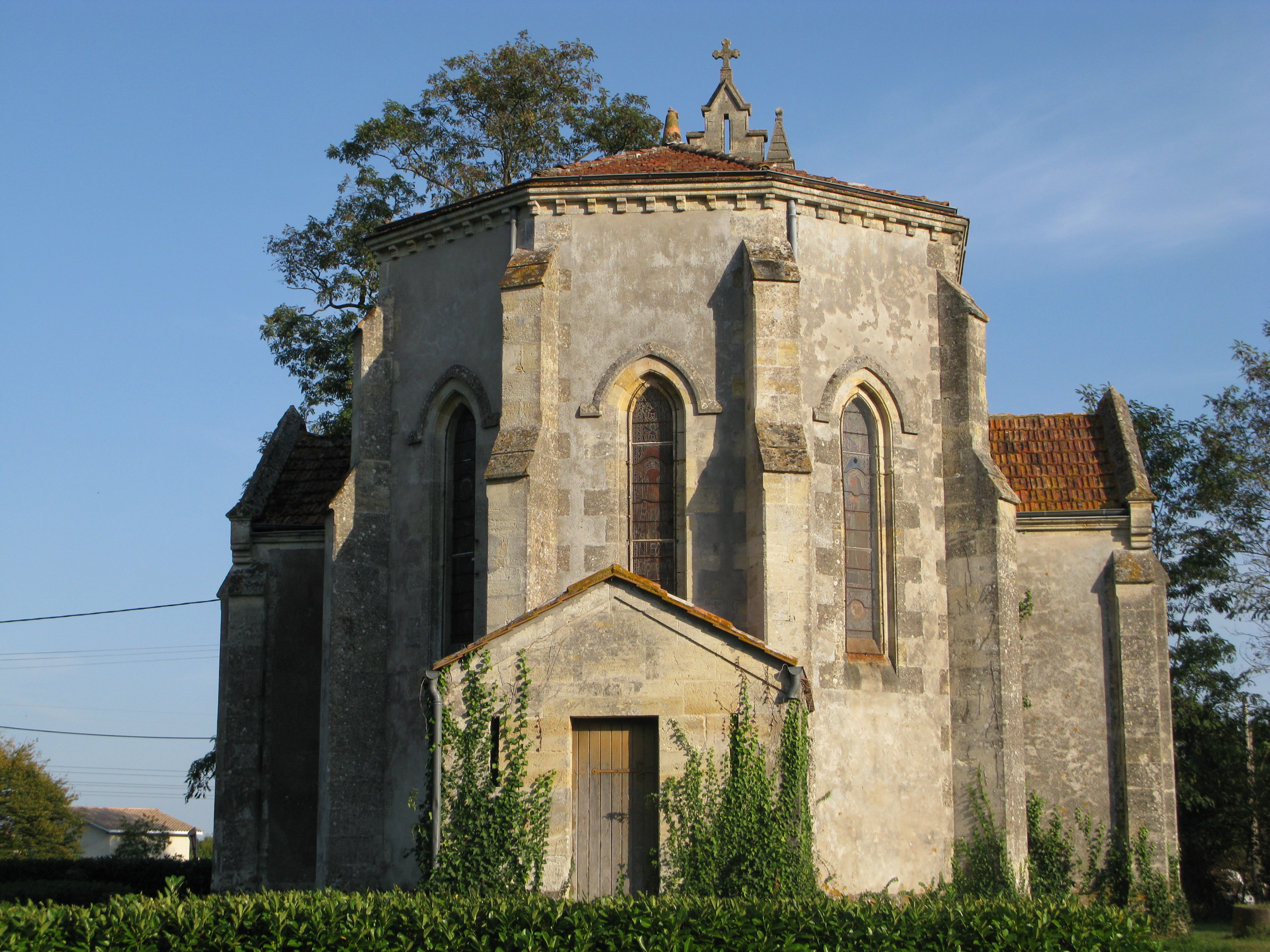
Chapel Saint-Denis

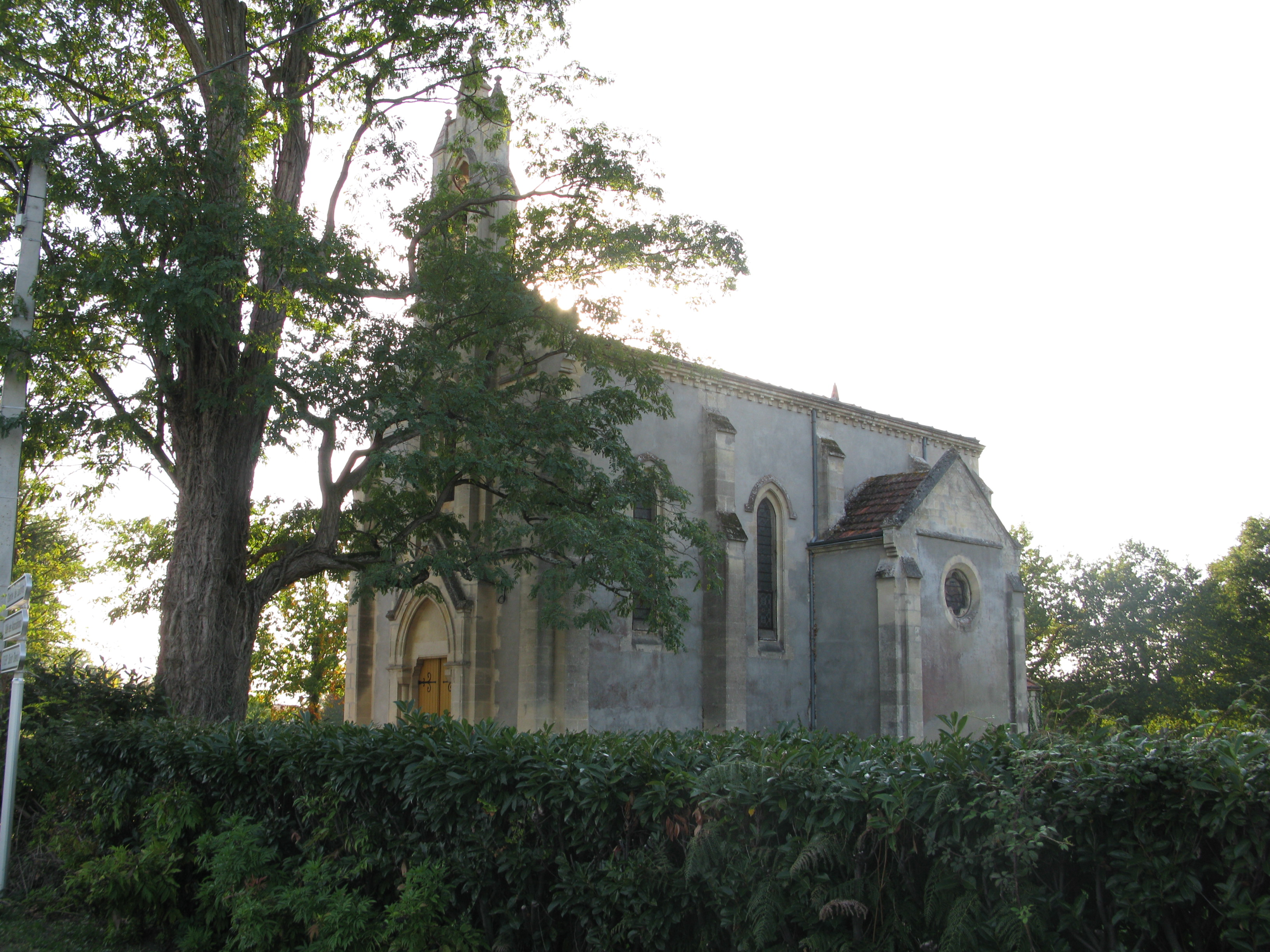
Chapel Saint-Denis

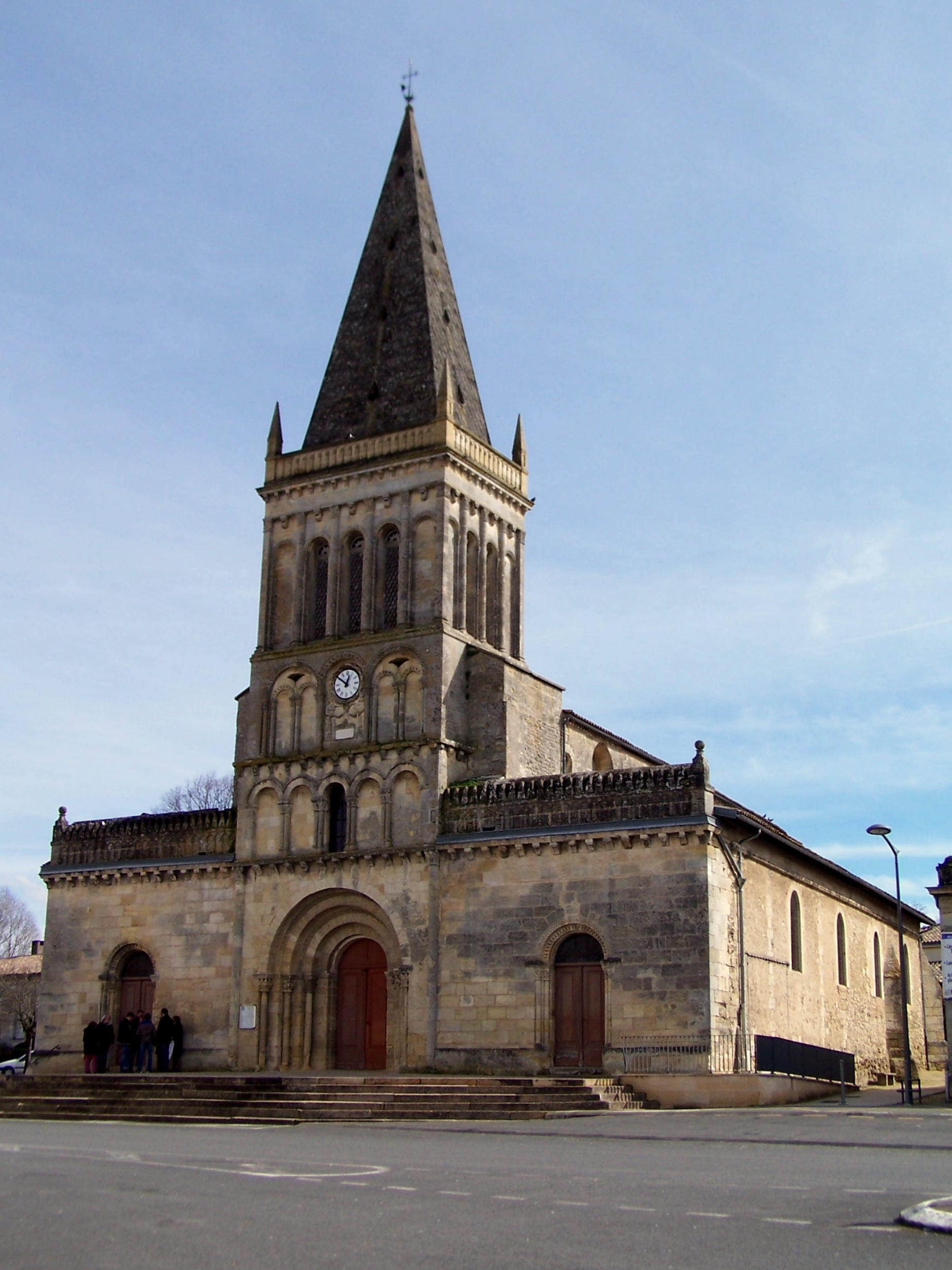
Church of Saint-Pierre

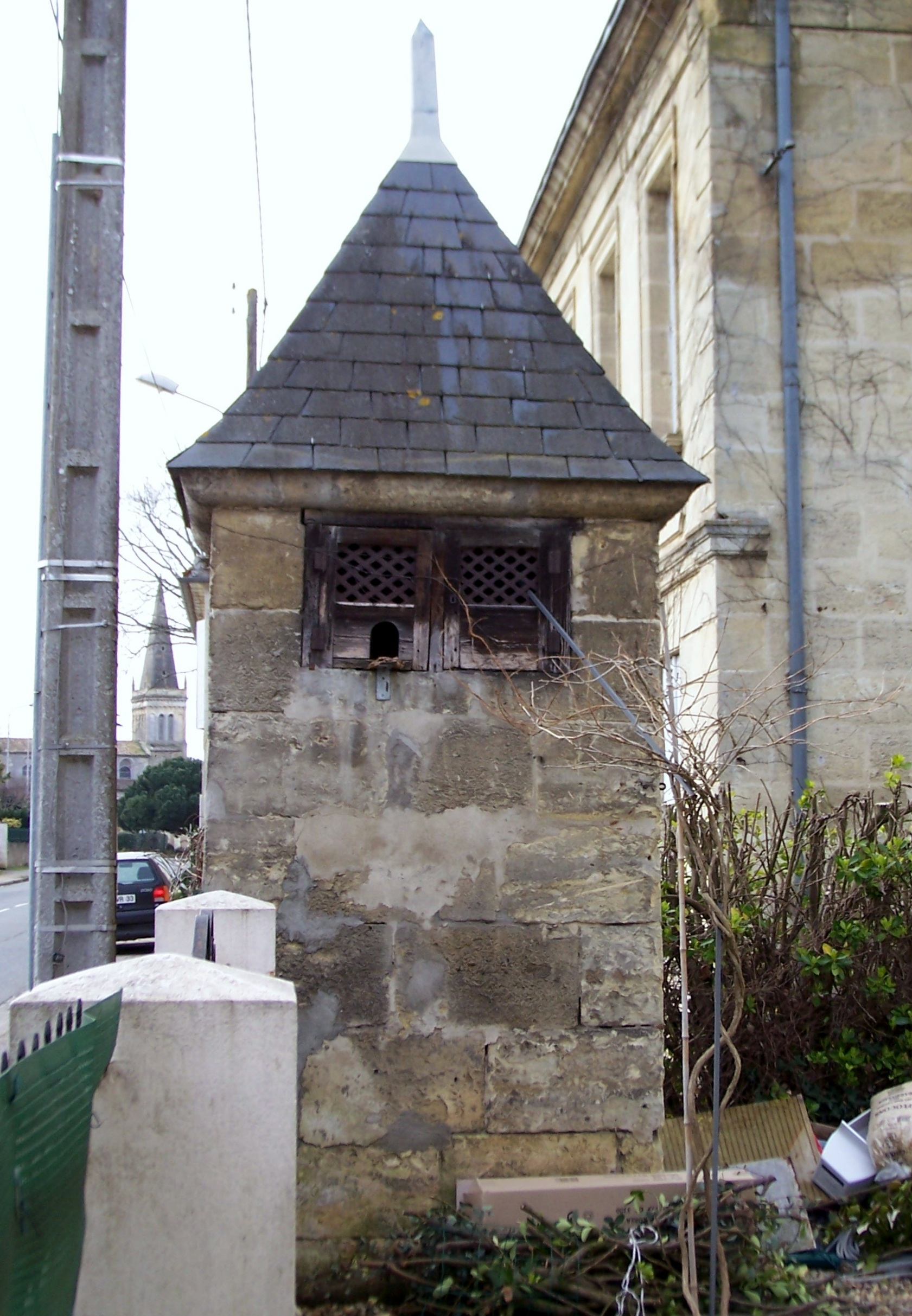
A Dovecote

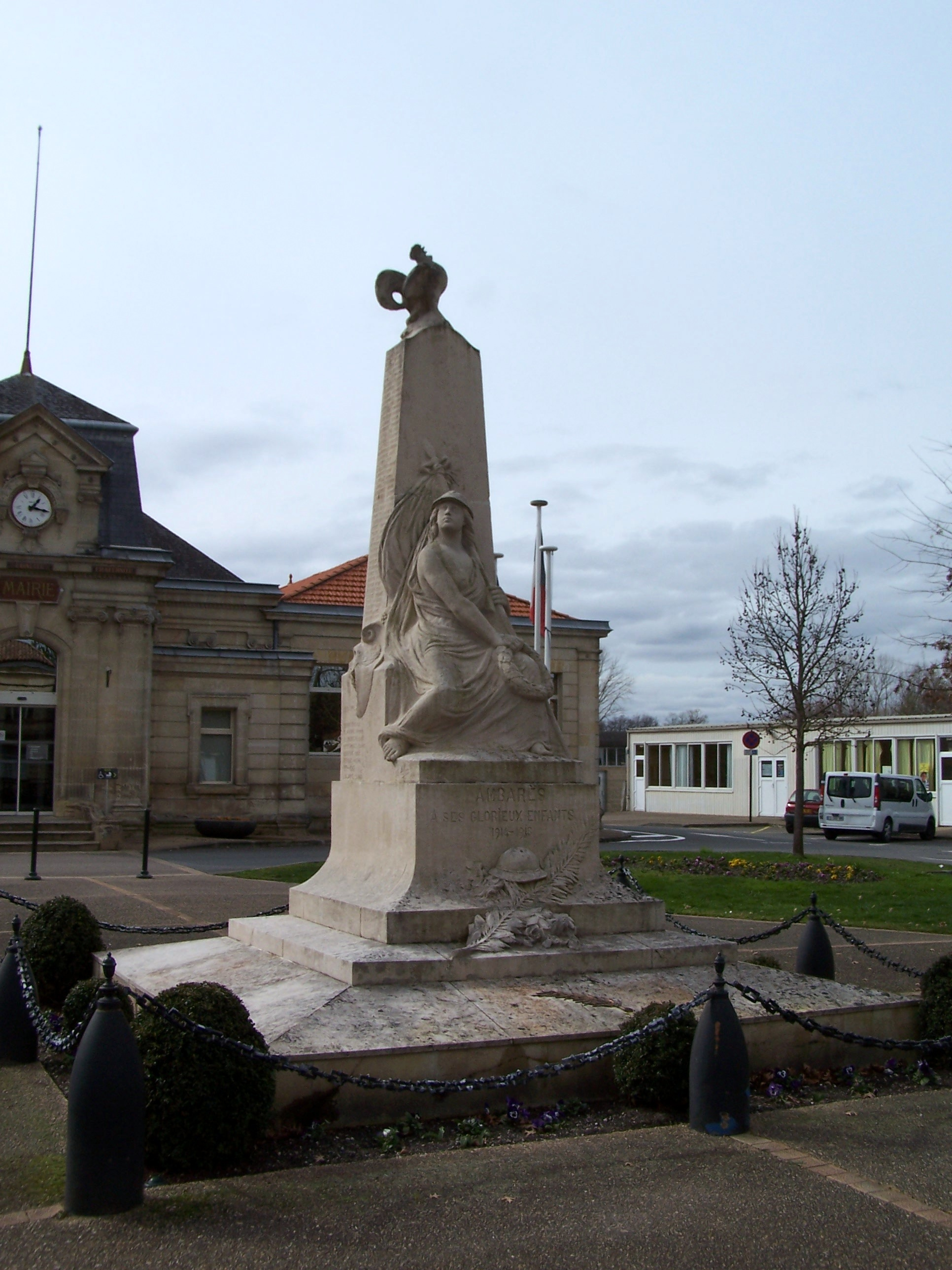
The War Memorial

== Sports ==
The Ambarésienne Sports Association (ASA) was founded in 1970 and is a sports association affiliated with the French Federation of Omnisports Clubs (FFCO). Its purpose is to provide sport for all. The ASA had more than 2,500 members and 23 sections in 2012.

== Notable people linked to the commune ==
- Members of the musical group Noir Désir recorded part of their debut album at Ambarès near La Blanche (water point) and one of the members of the group lives in Ambarès.
- André Lignac, born in Ambarès and was deputy mayor of the town for over 50 years.
- Marc Oraison (1914–1979), born in Ambarès, priest and doctor.

== See also ==
- Communes of the Gironde department
