= Canton of Saint-Médard-en-Jalles =

Coordinates: 44.89°N 0.71°W

The canton of Saint-Médard-en-Jalles is an administrative division of the Gironde department, southwestern France. Its borders were modified at the French canton reorganisation which came into effect in March 2015. Its seat is in Saint-Médard-en-Jalles.

Canton of Saint-Médard-en-Jalles consists of the following communes:

1. Saint-Aubin-de-Médoc
2. Saint-Médard-en-Jalles
3. Le Taillan-Médoc
