= Bordeaux Métropole =

Coordinates: 44.84°N 0.58°W

- Métropole
- Location within the Gironde department
- Country: France
- Region: Nouvelle-Aquitaine
- Department: Gironde
- No. of communes: 28
- Established: 1 January 2015

Government
  - President (2024–): Christine Bost
- Area: 578.28 km^{2} (223.28 sq mi)
- Population (2018): 801,041
  - Density: 1,385.2/km^{2} (3,587.7/sq mi)
- Website: www.bordeaux-metropole.com

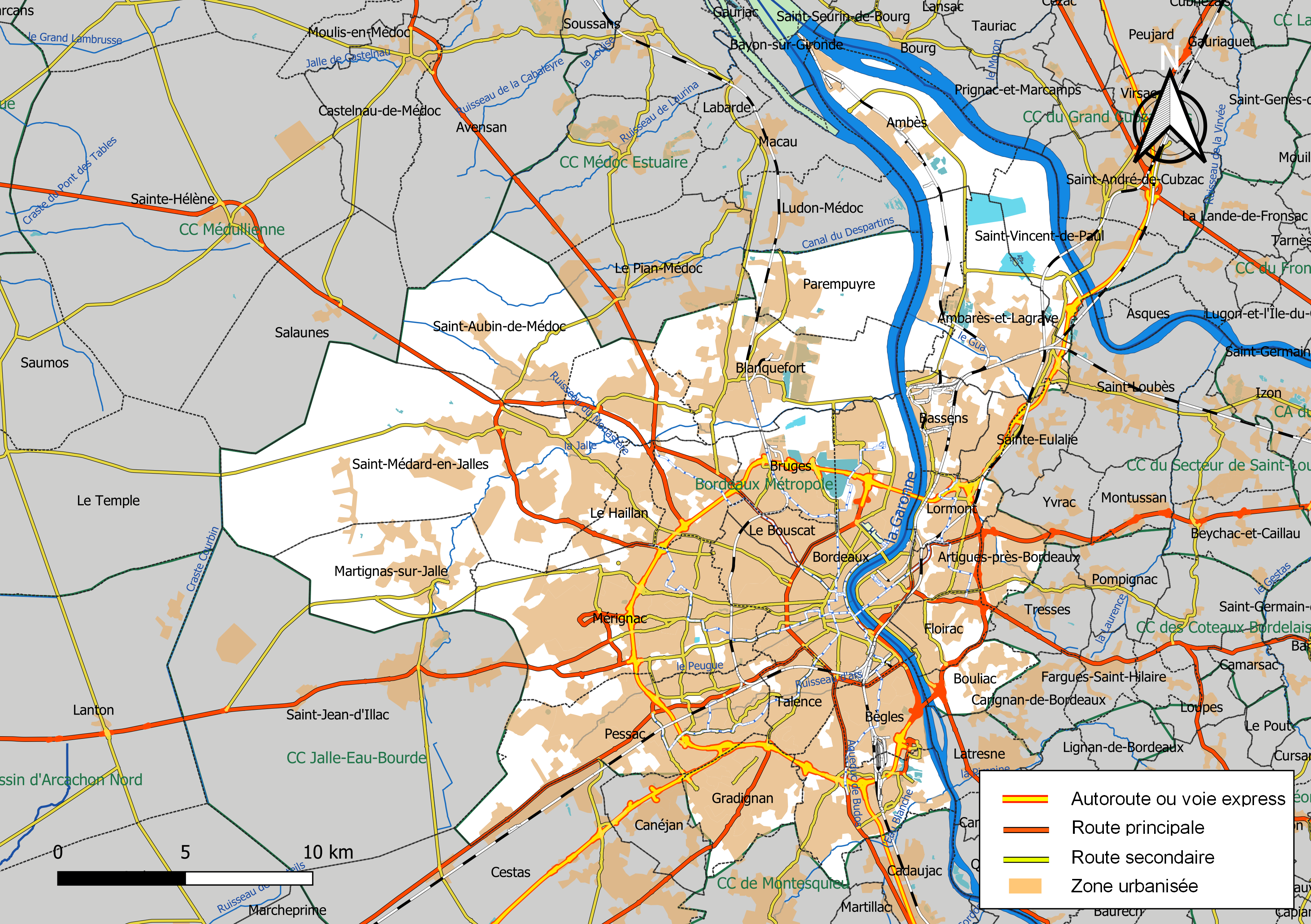
Road map of Bordeaux Métropole

Bordeaux Métropole (French pronunciation: [bɔʁdo metʁɔpɔl]) is the métropole, an intercommunal structure, centred on the city of Bordeaux. It is located in the center of the Gironde department, in the Nouvelle-Aquitaine region, in South West France. It represents about half of the department's population. It was created in January 2015, replacing the previous Communauté urbaine de Bordeaux. It brings together 28 municipalities, and covers an area of 578.3 km^{2} (223.3 sq mi). Its population was 801,041 in 2018, of which 257,068 resided in Bordeaux proper.

Bordeaux Métropole encompasses only the central part of the metropolitan area of Bordeaux (see infobox at Bordeaux article for the metropolitan area). Communes further away from the center of the metropolitan area have formed their own intercommunal structures, such as:

- Communauté de communes de Montesquieu
- Communauté de communes des Coteaux Bordelais
- Communauté de communes Les Rives de la Laurence
- Communauté de communes Jalle Eau Bourde
- etc.

== History ==
The Urban Community of Bordeaux (French: Communauté urbaine de Bordeaux), also known by its French initials CUB, was created in 1966 by the law of 31 December on urban communities which instituted the urban communities of Bordeaux, Lille, Lyon and Strasbourg.

On 1 January 2015, the Métropole replaced the Urban Community in accordance with a law of January 2014.

== Communes ==
The 28 communes of Bordeaux Métropole are:

1. Ambarès-et-Lagrave
2. Ambès
3. Artigues-près-Bordeaux
4. Bassens
5. Bègles
6. Blanquefort
7. Bordeaux
8. Bouliac
9. Le Bouscat
10. Bruges
11. Carbon-Blanc
12. Cenon
13. Eysines
14. Floirac
15. Gradignan
16. Le Haillan
17. Lormont
18. Martignas-sur-Jalle
19. Mérignac
20. Parempuyre
21. Pessac
22. Saint-Aubin-de-Médoc
23. Saint-Louis-de-Montferrand
24. Saint-Médard-en-Jalles
25. Saint-Vincent-de-Paul
26. Le Taillan-Médoc
27. Talence
28. Villenave-d'Ornon

== Administration ==
The Metropolitan Council consists of 101 members, one of them being the president, currently Alain Juppé, the mayor of Bordeaux.

== Presidents of Metropolitan Bordeaux ==
Name		Dates du mandat		Parti	Notes
Jacques Chaban-Delmas	Jacques Chaban-Delmas	1967	1977	UDR	Mayor of Bordeaux / Deputy of Gironde
Michel Sainte-Marie	Michel Sainte-Marie	1977	1983	PS	Deputy of Gironde / Mayor of Mérignac
Jacques Chaban-Delmas	Jacques Chaban-Delmas	1983	1995	RPR	Mayor of Bordeaux / Deputy of Gironde
Alain Juppé	Alain Juppé	1995	2004	UMP	Prime minister from 1995 to 1997 / Mayor of Bordeaux
Alain Rousset	Alain Rousset	2004	2007	PS	Mayor of Pessac / President of Aquitaine Regional Council / Resigned because of overlapping mandates
Vincent Feltesse	Vincent Feltesse	2007	2014	PS	Mayor of Blanquefort in 2012 / Deputy of Gironde
Alain Juppé	Alain Juppé	2014	2019	UMP LR	Prime minister from 1995 to 1997 / Mayor of Bordeaux, premier president of Bordeaux Métropole
Patrick Bobet	Patrick Bobet	2019	2020	LR	Mayor of Bouscat; replaced Alain Juppé after he left in February 2019
Alain Anziani	Alain Anziani	2020	2024	PS	Mayor of Mérignac / Senator for Gironde
Christine Bost	Christine Bost	2024	2026	PS	Mayor of Eysines; elected after Alain Anziani resigned for health reasons
Thomas Cazenave	Thomas Cazenave	2026		RE	Mayor of Bordeaux / Minister Delegate for Public Accounts
