= Parempuyre =

- Commune
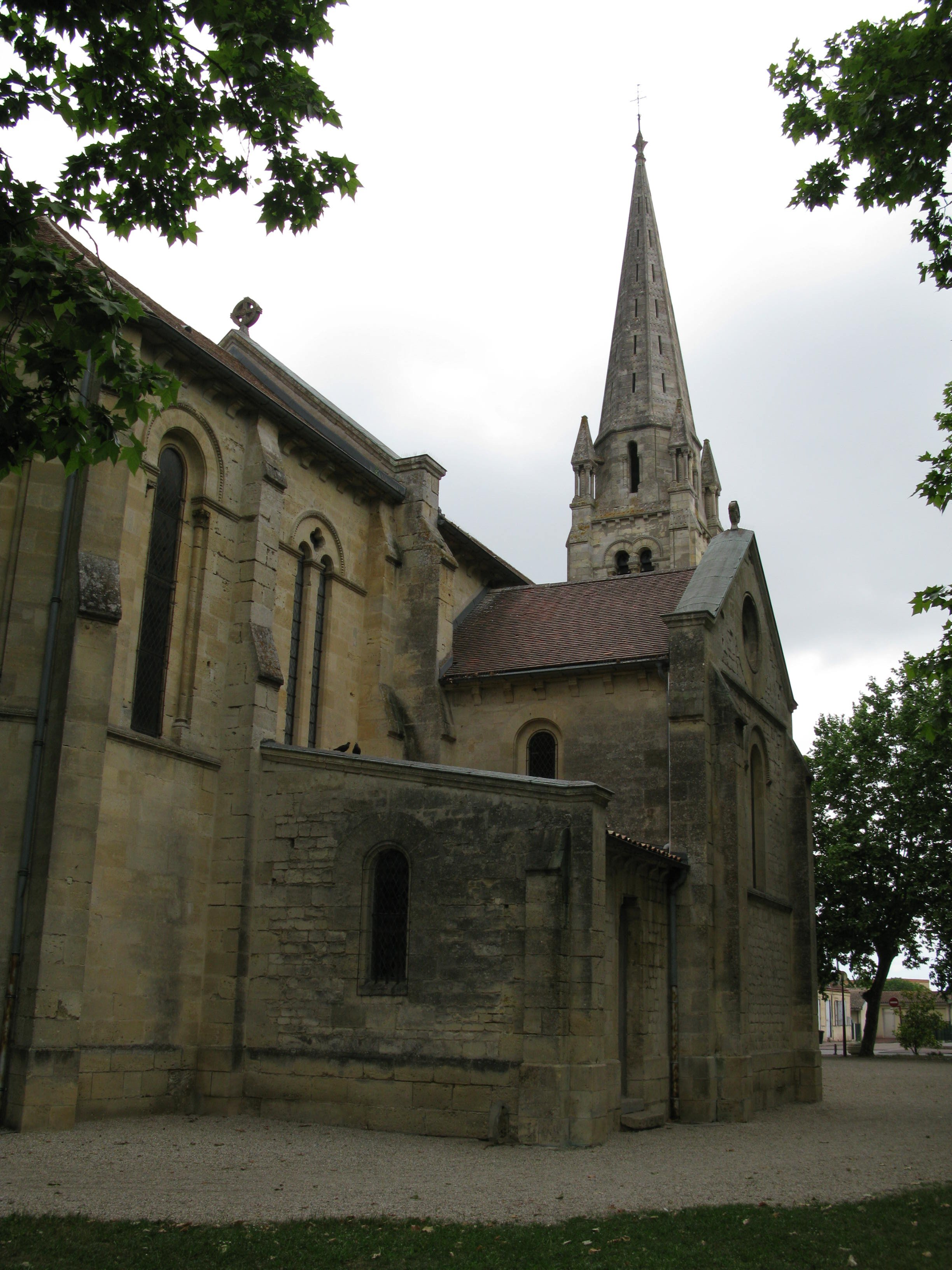
- The church in Parempuyre

- Coat of arms
- Location of Parempuyre
- Location within France Location within Nouvelle-Aquitaine
- Coordinates: 44°57′00″N 0°36′14″W
- Country: France
- Region: Nouvelle-Aquitaine
- Department: Gironde
- Arrondissement: Bordeaux
- Canton: Les Portes du Médoc
- Intercommunality: Bordeaux Métropole

Government
  - Mayor (2020–2026): Béatrice de François
- Area^{1}: 21.8 km^{2} (8.4 sq mi)
- Elevation: 7 m (23 ft)
- Highest elevation: 15 m (49 ft)
- Lowest elevation: 0 m (0 ft)
- Population (2023): 10,672
  - Density: 490/km^{2} (1,270/sq mi)
- Time zone: UTC+01:00 (CET)
  - Summer (DST): UTC+02:00 (CEST)
- INSEE/Postal code: 33312 /33290
- ^{1} French Land Register data, which excludes lakes, ponds, glaciers > 1 km^{2} (0.386 sq mi or 247 acres) and river estuaries.

Parempuyre (French pronunciation: [paʁɑ̃pɥiʁ]; Occitan: Parampuira) is a commune in the Gironde department in Nouvelle-Aquitaine in southwestern France.

== Heraldry ==
| Arms of Parempuyre | Divided per pale, first vert with a gold hunting horn, second azure charged with silver waves. |

== Population ==
Historical population
| Year | Pop. | ±% p.a. |
|---|---|---|
| 1968 | 1,670 | — |
| 1975 | 2,148 | +3.66% |
| 1982 | 3,541 | +7.40% |
| 1990 | 5,481 | +5.61% |
| 1999 | 6,613 | +2.11% |
| 2007 | 7,324 | +1.28% |
| 2012 | 7,942 | +1.63% |
| 2017 | 8,709 | +1.86% |
| 2023 | 10,672 | +3.45% |
Source: INSEE

== See also ==
- Communes of the Gironde department
