= Carbon-Blanc =

- Commune
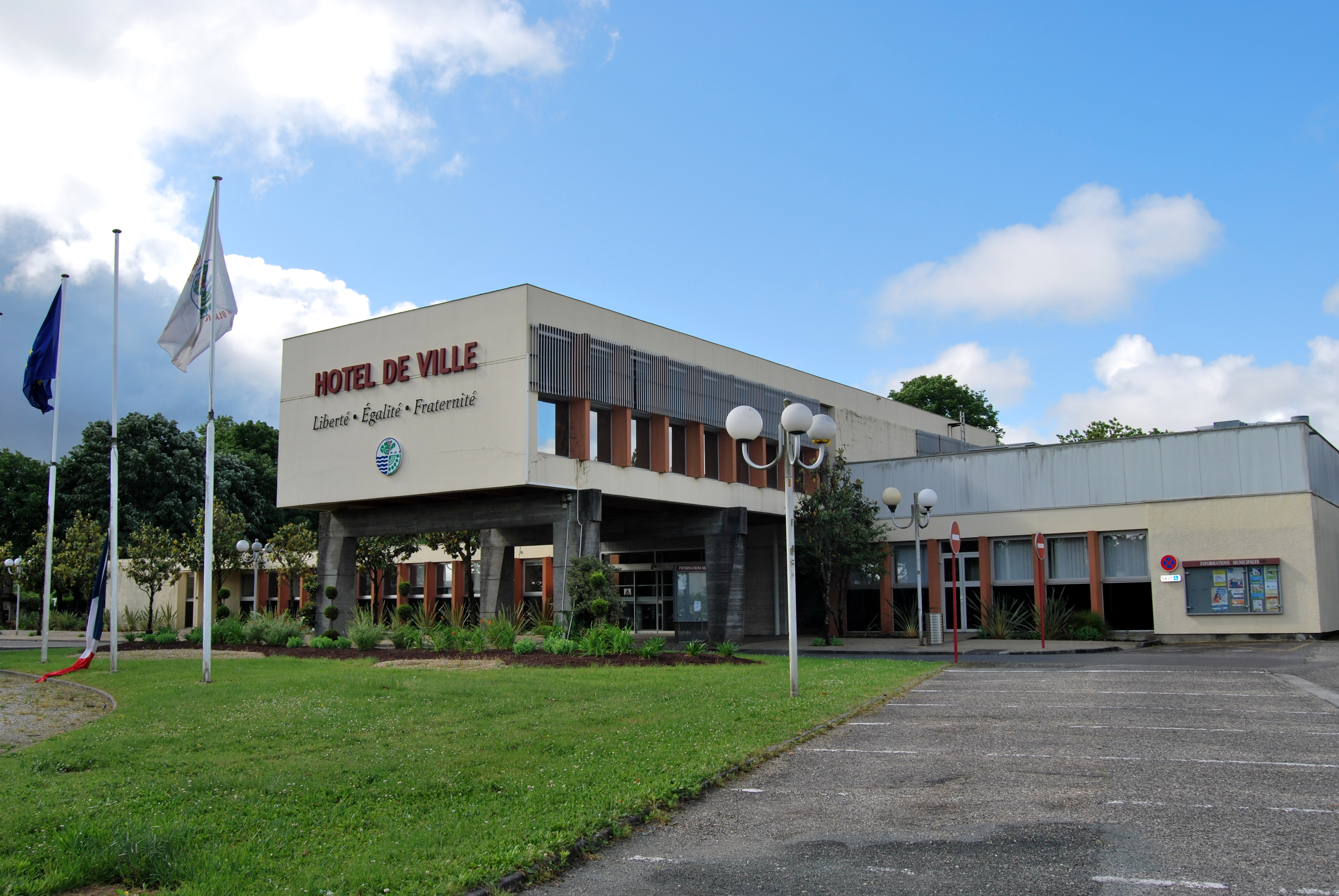
- The town hall in Carbon-Blanc
- Location of Carbon-Blanc
- Location within France Location within Nouvelle-Aquitaine
- Coordinates: 44°53′45″N 0°30′19″W
- Country: France
- Region: Nouvelle-Aquitaine
- Department: Gironde
- Arrondissement: Bordeaux
- Canton: La Presqu'île
- Intercommunality: Bordeaux Métropole

Government
  - Mayor (2020–2026): Patrick Labesse
- Area^{1}: 3.86 km^{2} (1.49 sq mi)
- Elevation: 28 m (92 ft)
- Highest elevation: 55 m (180 ft)
- Lowest elevation: 10 m (33 ft)
- Population (2023): 8,331
  - Density: 2,160/km^{2} (5,590/sq mi)
- Time zone: UTC+01:00 (CET)
  - Summer (DST): UTC+02:00 (CEST)
- INSEE/Postal code: 33096 /33560
- ^{1} French Land Register data, which excludes lakes, ponds, glaciers > 1 km^{2} (0.386 sq mi or 247 acres) and river estuaries.

Carbon-Blanc (French pronunciation: [kaʁbɔ̃ blɑ̃]; Occitan: Carbon Blanc) is a commune in the Gironde department in Nouvelle-Aquitaine in southwestern France. The commune was created in 1853 when it was separated from neighboring Bassens by decree of Napoleon III.

== Population ==
Historical population

Year	Pop.	±% p.a.
1856	735	—
1861	839	+2.68%
1866	918	+1.82%
1872	851	−1.26%
1876	824	−0.80%
1881	788	−0.89%
1886	887	+2.40%
1891	846	−0.94%
1896	855	+0.21%
1901	865	+0.23%
1906	865	+0.00%
1911	852	−0.30%
1921	958	+1.18%
1926	964	+0.12%

Year	Pop.	±% p.a.
1931	1,127	+3.17%
1936	1,107	−0.36%
1946	1,149	+0.37%
1954	1,300	+1.56%
1962	1,628	+2.85%
1968	3,075	+11.18%
1975	4,567	+5.81%
1982	5,733	+3.30%
1990	5,842	+0.24%
1999	6,620	+1.40%
2007	6,971	+0.65%
2012	7,147	+0.50%
2017	8,091	+2.51%
2023	8,331	+0.49%

Source: EHESS and INSEE (1968-2023)

== Sister cities ==
Carbon-Blanc has 2 sister cities:

- Großostheim, Germany
- San Martín de Valdeiglesias, Spain

== See also ==
- Communes of the Gironde department
