= Artigues-près-Bordeaux =

- Commune
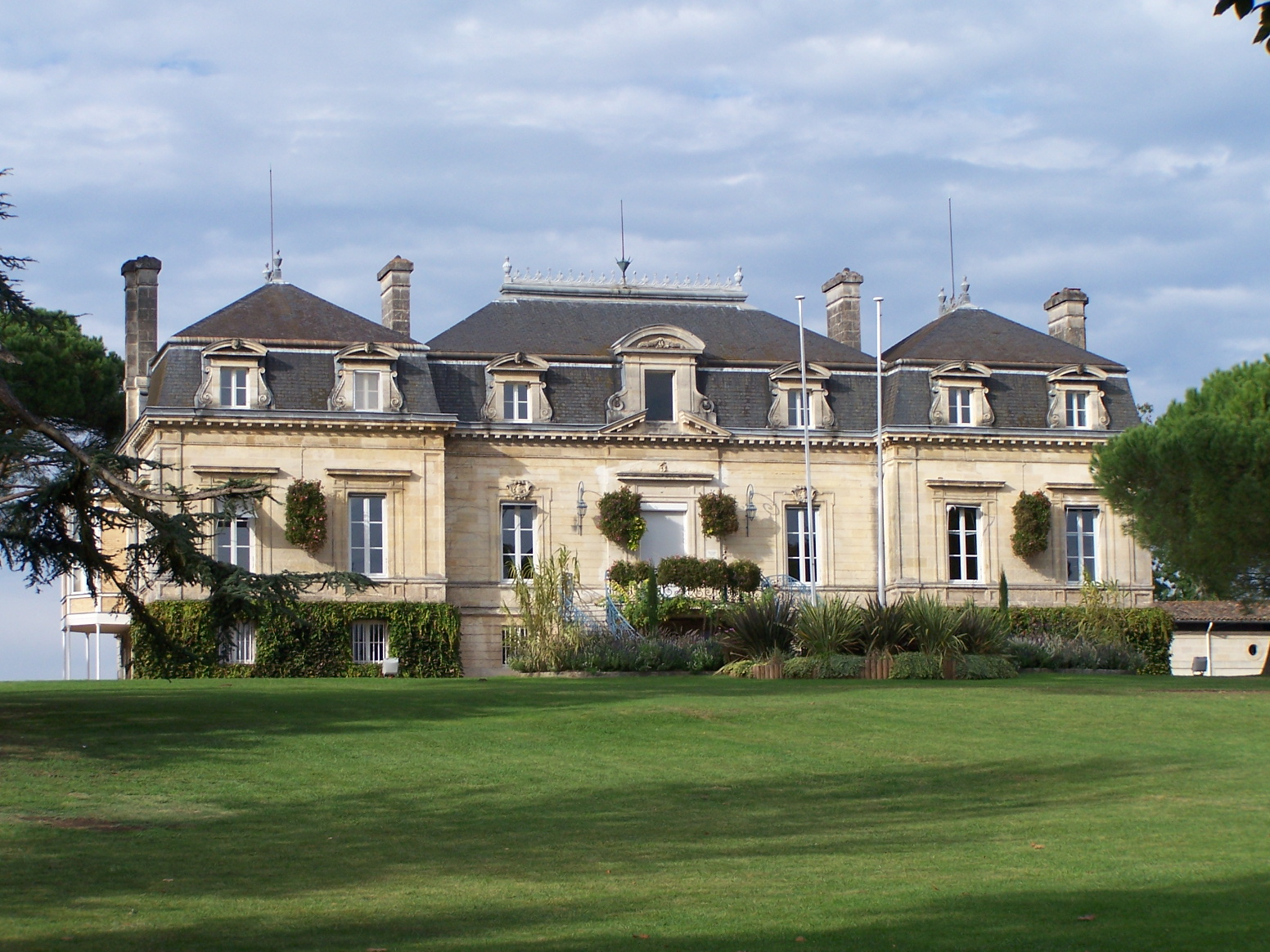
- Town hall

- Coat of arms
- Location of Artigues-près-Bordeaux
- Location within France Location within Nouvelle-Aquitaine
- Coordinates: 44°51′46″N 0°29′06″W
- Country: France
- Region: Nouvelle-Aquitaine
- Department: Gironde
- Arrondissement: Bordeaux
- Canton: Lormont
- Intercommunality: Bordeaux Métropole

Government
  - Mayor (2020–2026): Alain Garnier
- Area^{1}: 7.36 km^{2} (2.84 sq mi)
- Elevation: 63 m (207 ft)
- Highest elevation: 81 m (266 ft)
- Lowest elevation: 30 m (98 ft)
- Population (2023): 8,687
  - Density: 1,180/km^{2} (3,060/sq mi)
- Time zone: UTC+01:00 (CET)
  - Summer (DST): UTC+02:00 (CEST)
- INSEE/Postal code: 33013 /33370
- Website: http://www.artigues-pres-bordeaux.fr
- ^{1} French Land Register data, which excludes lakes, ponds, glaciers > 1 km^{2} (0.386 sq mi or 247 acres) and river estuaries.

Artigues-près-Bordeaux (French pronunciation: [aʁtiɡ pʁɛ bɔʁdo], literally Artigues near Bordeaux; Occitan: Artigas de Bordèu) is a commune in the Gironde department in southwestern France.

== Population ==
Historical population

| Year | Pop. | ±% p.a. |
|---|---|---|
| 1793 | 364 | — |
| 1800 | 299 | −2.77% |
| 1806 | 368 | +3.52% |
| 1821 | 345 | −0.43% |
| 1831 | 387 | +1.16% |
| 1836 | 395 | +0.41% |
| 1841 | 397 | +0.10% |
| 1846 | 444 | +2.26% |
| 1851 | 430 | −0.64% |
| 1856 | 439 | +0.42% |
| 1861 | 440 | +0.05% |
| 1866 | 468 | +1.24% |
| 1872 | 434 | −1.25% |
| 1876 | 443 | +0.51% |
| 1881 | 439 | −0.18% |
| 1886 | 458 | +0.85% |
| 1891 | 452 | −0.26% |
| 1896 | 497 | +1.92% |
| 1901 | 487 | −0.41% |

| Year | Pop. | ±% p.a. |
|---|---|---|
| 1906 | 502 | +0.61% |
| 1911 | 480 | −0.89% |
| 1921 | 528 | +0.96% |
| 1926 | 605 | +2.76% |
| 1931 | 607 | +0.07% |
| 1936 | 680 | +2.30% |
| 1946 | 672 | −0.12% |
| 1954 | 746 | +1.31% |
| 1962 | 775 | +0.48% |
| 1968 | 966 | +3.74% |
| 1975 | 1,499 | +6.48% |
| 1982 | 2,723 | +8.90% |
| 1990 | 5,530 | +9.26% |
| 1999 | 5,984 | +0.88% |
| 2007 | 6,491 | +1.02% |
| 2012 | 7,582 | +3.16% |
| 2017 | 8,639 | +2.64% |
| 2023 | 8,687 | +0.09% |

Source: EHESS and INSEE (1968-2023)

== See also ==
- Communes of the Gironde department
