= Le Taillan-Médoc =

Le Taillan-Médoc Lo Telhan de Medòc (Occitan)
- Commune
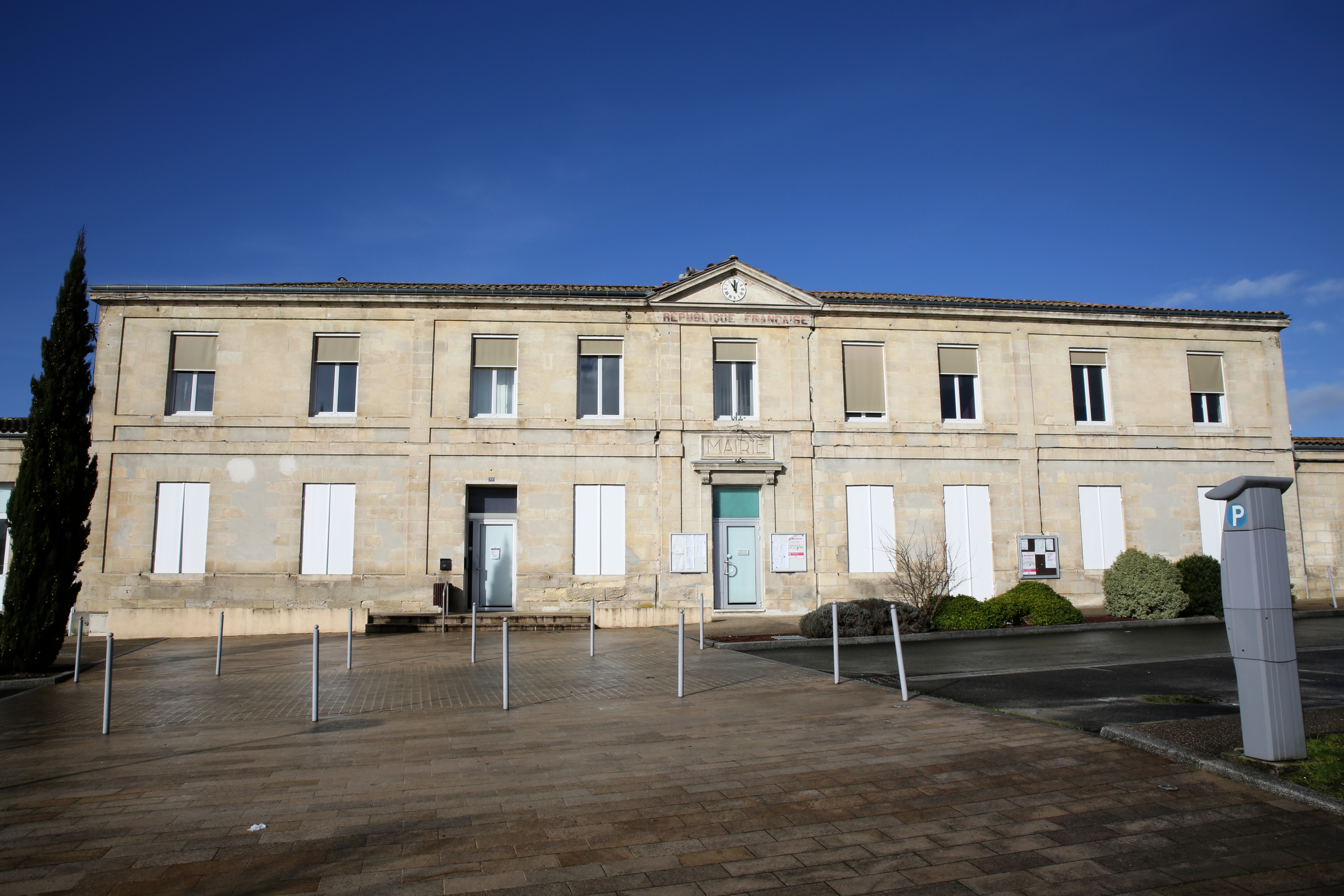
- Le Taillan-Médoc Town Hall

- Coat of arms
- Location of Le Taillan-Médoc
- Location within France Location within Nouvelle-Aquitaine
- Coordinates: 44°54′19″N 0°40′07″W
- Country: France
- Region: Nouvelle-Aquitaine
- Department: Gironde
- Arrondissement: Bordeaux
- Canton: Saint-Médard-en-Jalles
- Intercommunality: Bordeaux Métropole

Government
  - Mayor (2024–2026): Eric Cabrillat
- Area^{1}: 15.16 km^{2} (5.85 sq mi)
- Elevation: 26 m (85 ft)
- Highest elevation: 39 m (128 ft)
- Lowest elevation: 4 m (13 ft)
- Population (2023): 11,073
  - Density: 730.4/km^{2} (1,892/sq mi)
- Time zone: UTC+01:00 (CET)
  - Summer (DST): UTC+02:00 (CEST)
- INSEE/Postal code: 33519 /33320
- ^{1} French Land Register data, which excludes lakes, ponds, glaciers > 1 km^{2} (0.386 sq mi or 247 acres) and river estuaries.

Le Taillan-Médoc (French pronunciation: [lə tajɑ̃ medɔk], lit. "The Taillan Médoc"; Occitan: Lo Telhan de Medòc, lit. "The Taillan of Médoc") is a commune in the Gironde department in the Nouvelle-Aquitaine region in Southwestern France. Part of Bordeaux Métropole, it is located northwest of Bordeaux.

== Demographics ==
Historical population
| Year | Pop. | ±% p.a. |
|---|---|---|
| 1968 | 2,778 | — |
| 1975 | 4,038 | +5.49% |
| 1982 | 5,124 | +3.46% |
| 1990 | 6,815 | +3.63% |
| 1999 | 7,885 | +1.63% |
| 2007 | 8,719 | +1.26% |
| 2012 | 9,335 | +1.37% |
| 2017 | 10,096 | +1.58% |
| 2023 | 11,073 | +1.55% |
Source: INSEE

== See also ==
- Communes of the Gironde department
