= Saint-Aubin-de-Médoc =

Saint-Aubin-de-Médoc Sent Aubin de Medòc (Occitan)
- Commune
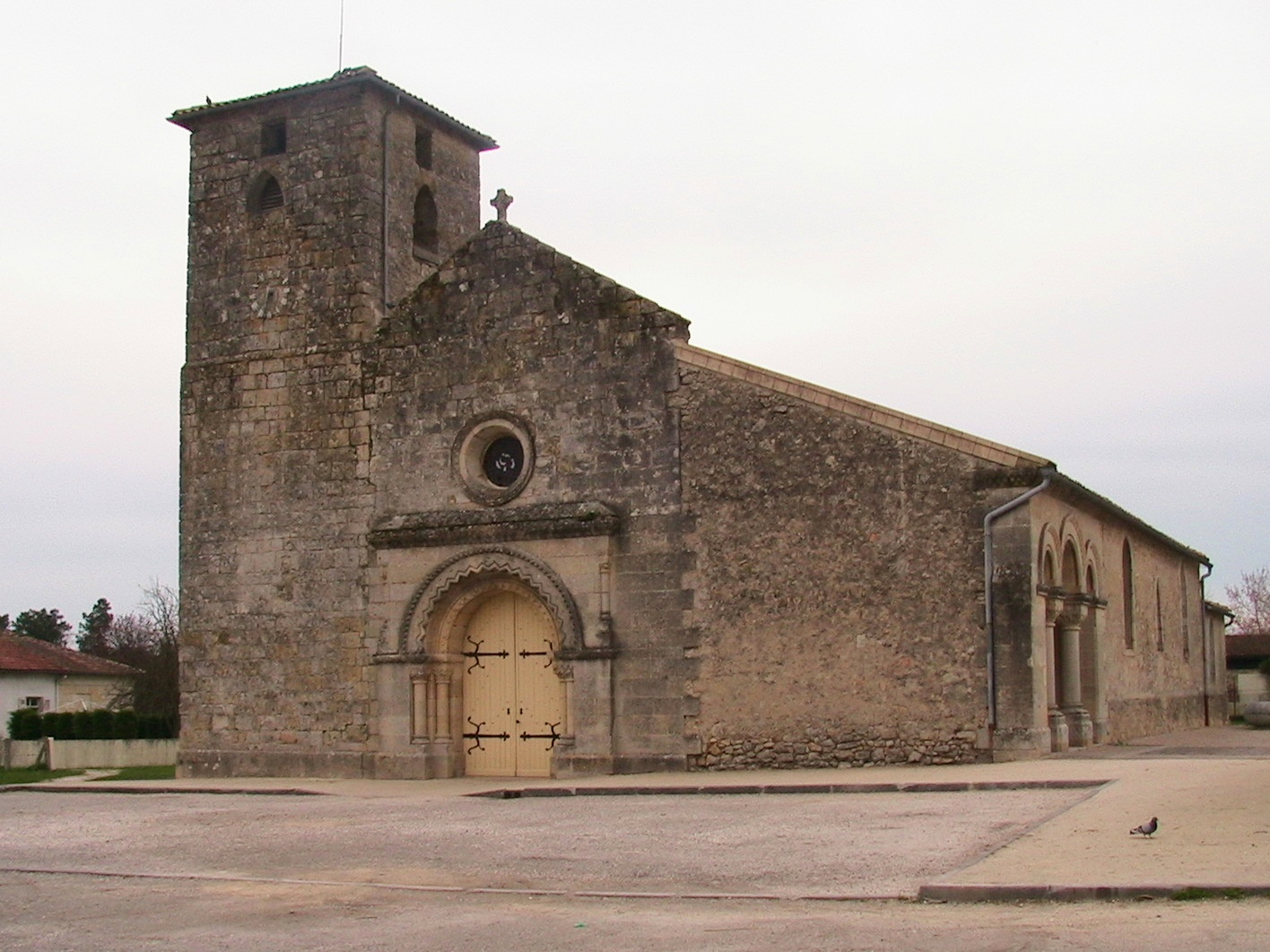
- The church in Saint-Aubin-de-Médoc
- Location of Saint-Aubin-de-Médoc
- Location within France Location within Nouvelle-Aquitaine
- Coordinates: 44°54′47″N 0°43′27″W
- Country: France
- Region: Nouvelle-Aquitaine
- Department: Gironde
- Arrondissement: Bordeaux
- Canton: Saint-Médard-en-Jalles
- Intercommunality: Bordeaux Métropole

Government
  - Mayor (2020–2026): Christophe Duprat
- Area^{1}: 34.72 km^{2} (13.41 sq mi)
- Elevation: 30 m (98 ft)
- Highest elevation: 51 m (167 ft)
- Lowest elevation: 23 m (75 ft)
- Population (2023): 7,769
  - Density: 223.8/km^{2} (579.5/sq mi)
- Time zone: UTC+01:00 (CET)
  - Summer (DST): UTC+02:00 (CEST)
- INSEE/Postal code: 33376 /33160
- ^{1} French Land Register data, which excludes lakes, ponds, glaciers > 1 km^{2} (0.386 sq mi or 247 acres) and river estuaries.

Saint-Aubin-de-Médoc (French pronunciation: [sɛ̃.t‿obɛ̃ də medɔk], lit. "Saint Aubin of Médoc"; Occitan: Sent Aubin de Medòc) is a commune in the Gironde department in the Nouvelle-Aquitaine region in Southwestern France. Part of Bordeaux Métropole, it is located northwest of Bordeaux.

== Demographics ==
Historical population
Year	Pop.	±% p.a.
1968	723	—
1975	2,105	+16.49%
1982	2,979	+5.09%
1990	4,332	+4.79%
1999	4,990	+1.58%
2007	5,610	+1.47%
2012	6,350	+2.51%
2017	7,362	+3.00%
2023	7,769	+0.90%
Source: INSEE

== See also ==
- Communes of the Gironde department
