= Bassens, Gironde =

Bassens
- Commune
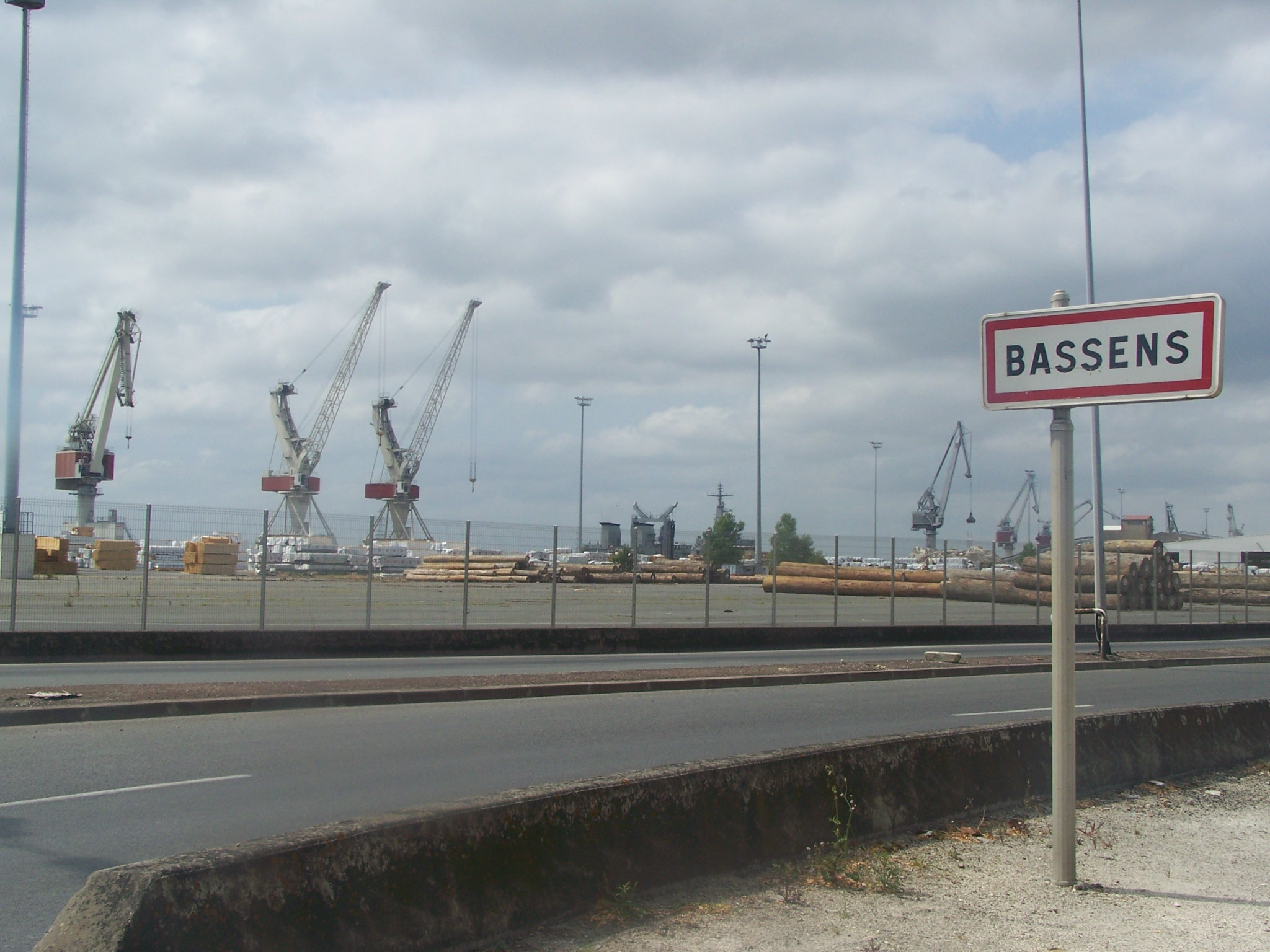
- Docks

- Coat of arms
- Location of Bassens
- Location within France Location within Nouvelle-Aquitaine
- Coordinates: 44°53′56″N 0°30′50″W
- Country: France
- Region: Nouvelle-Aquitaine
- Department: Gironde
- Arrondissement: Bordeaux
- Canton: Lormont
- Intercommunality: Bordeaux Métropole

Government
  - Mayor (2020–2026): Alexandre Rubio
- Area^{1}: 10.27 km^{2} (3.97 sq mi)
- Elevation: 45 m (148 ft)
- Highest elevation: 56 m (184 ft)
- Lowest elevation: 2 m (6.6 ft)
- Population (2023): 8,435
  - Density: 821.3/km^{2} (2,127/sq mi)
- Time zone: UTC+01:00 (CET)
  - Summer (DST): UTC+02:00 (CEST)
- INSEE/Postal code: 33032 /33530
- ^{1} French Land Register data, which excludes lakes, ponds, glaciers > 1 km^{2} (0.386 sq mi or 247 acres) and river estuaries.

Bassens (French pronunciation: [basɛ̃s]) is a commune in the Gironde department in southwestern France.

== Population ==
Historical population
| Year | Pop. | ±% p.a. |
|---|---|---|
| 1968 | 4,841 | — |
| 1975 | 6,133 | +3.44% |
| 1982 | 6,595 | +1.04% |
| 1990 | 6,472 | −0.24% |
| 1999 | 6,978 | +0.84% |
| 2007 | 6,656 | −0.59% |
| 2012 | 6,967 | +0.92% |
| 2017 | 7,278 | +0.88% |
| 2023 | 8,435 | +2.49% |
Source: INSEE

== See also ==
- Communes of the Gironde department
