= Bouliac =

- Commune
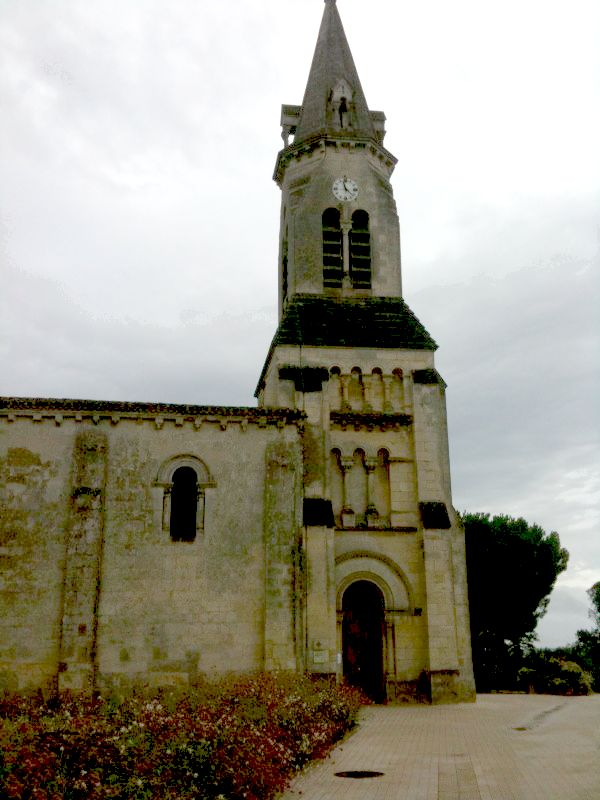
- The church in Bouliac

- Flag Coat of arms
- Location of Bouliac
- Location within France Location within Nouvelle-Aquitaine
- Coordinates: 44°48′57″N 0°30′03″W
- Country: France
- Region: Nouvelle-Aquitaine
- Department: Gironde
- Arrondissement: Bordeaux
- Canton: Cenon
- Intercommunality: Bordeaux Métropole

Government
  - Mayor (2020–2026): Dominique Alcala
- Area^{1}: 7.48 km^{2} (2.89 sq mi)
- Elevation: 75 m (246 ft)
- Highest elevation: 84 m (276 ft)
- Lowest elevation: 4 m (13 ft)
- Population (2023): 3,804
  - Density: 509/km^{2} (1,320/sq mi)
- Time zone: UTC+01:00 (CET)
  - Summer (DST): UTC+02:00 (CEST)
- INSEE/Postal code: 33065 /33270
- ^{1} French Land Register data, which excludes lakes, ponds, glaciers > 1 km^{2} (0.386 sq mi or 247 acres) and river estuaries.

Bouliac (French pronunciation: [buljak]; Occitan: Boliac) is a commune in the Gironde department in Nouvelle-Aquitaine in southwestern France.

== Population ==
Historical population
Year	Pop.	±% p.a.
1968	1,102	—
1975	2,375	+11.59%
1982	2,398	+0.14%
1990	2,841	+2.14%
1999	3,248	+1.50%
2007	3,056	−0.76%
2012	3,160	+0.67%
2017	3,631	+2.82%
2023	3,804	+0.78%
Source: INSEE

== See also ==
- Communes of the Gironde department
