= Saint-Louis-de-Montferrand =

- Commune
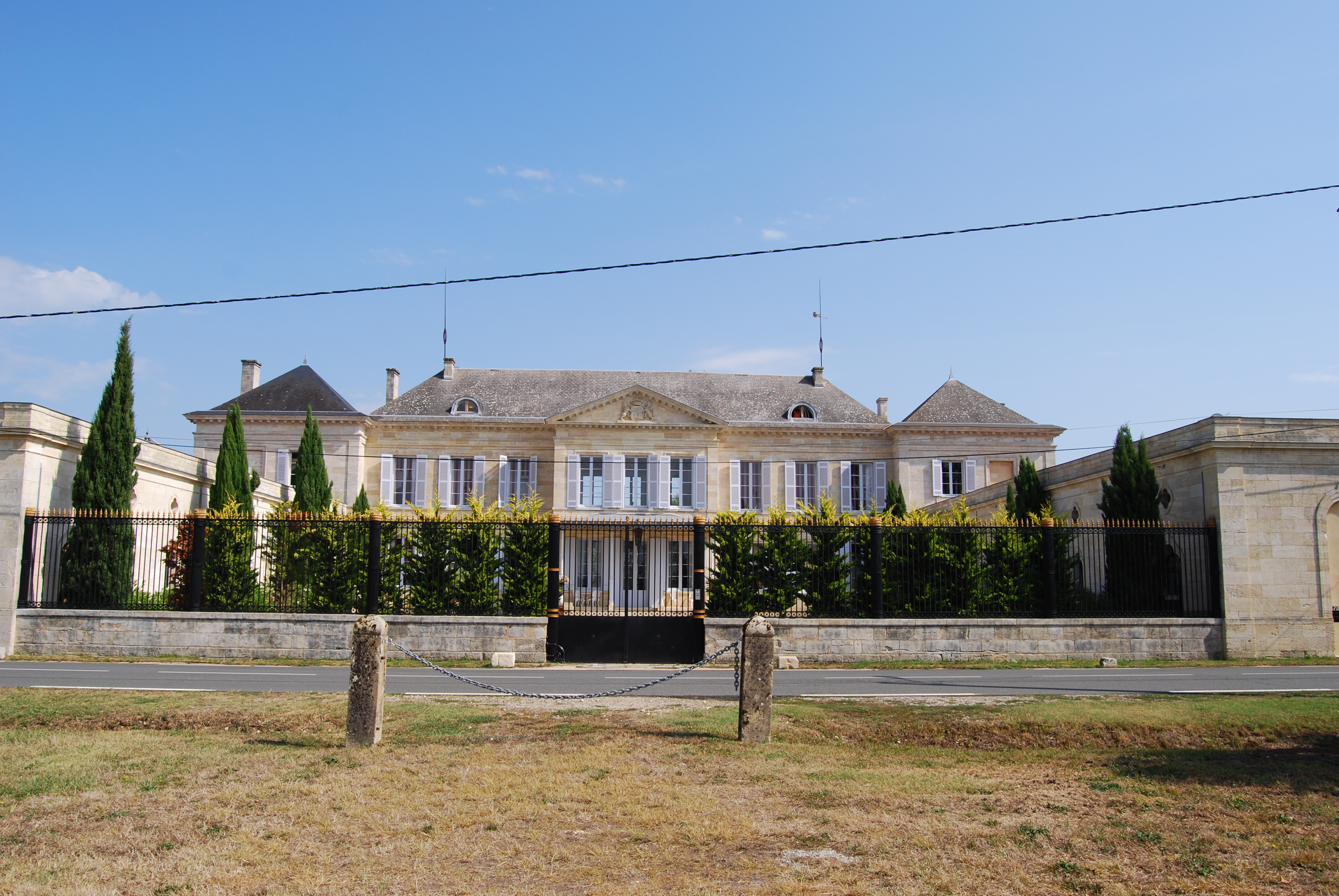
- Château Peyronnet

- Coat of arms
- Location of Saint-Louis-de-Montferrand
- Location within France Location within Nouvelle-Aquitaine
- Coordinates: 44°57′12″N 0°32′01″W
- Country: France
- Region: Nouvelle-Aquitaine
- Department: Gironde
- Arrondissement: Bordeaux
- Canton: La Presqu'île
- Intercommunality: Bordeaux Métropole

Government
  - Mayor (2020–2026): Josiane Zambon
- Area^{1}: 10.8 km^{2} (4.2 sq mi)
- Elevation: 4 m (13 ft)
- Highest elevation: 5 m (16 ft)
- Lowest elevation: 1 m (3.3 ft)
- Population (2023): 2,051
  - Density: 190/km^{2} (492/sq mi)
- Time zone: UTC+01:00 (CET)
  - Summer (DST): UTC+02:00 (CEST)
- INSEE/Postal code: 33434 /33440
- ^{1} French Land Register data, which excludes lakes, ponds, glaciers > 1 km^{2} (0.386 sq mi or 247 acres) and river estuaries.

Saint-Louis-de-Montferrand (French pronunciation: [sɛ̃lwi də mɔ̃fɛʁɑ̃]; Gascon: Sent Loís de Montferrand) is a commune in the Gironde department in the Nouvelle-Aquitaine region in Southwestern France.

== History ==
Origin of the name: from the surname of the Montferrands, owners of a very large part of the peninsula until the 18th century.

== Population ==
Historical population
Year	Pop.	±% p.a.
1968	1,165	—
1975	1,078	−1.10%
1982	1,340	+3.16%
1990	1,808	+3.82%
1999	1,864	+0.34%
2007	2,030	+1.07%
2012	2,073	+0.42%
2017	2,153	+0.76%
2023	2,051	−0.81%
Source: INSEE

== See also ==
- Communes of the Gironde department
