= Ambès =

- Commune
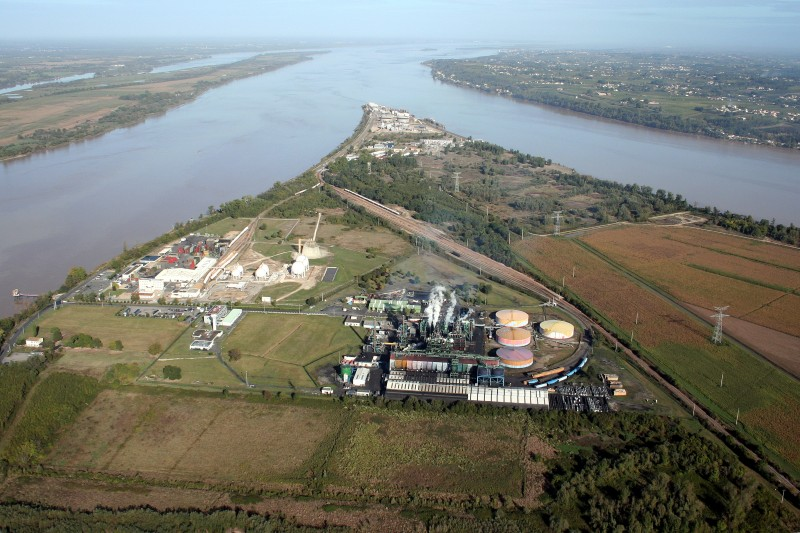
- Port

- Coat of arms
- Location of Ambès
- Location within France Location within Nouvelle-Aquitaine
- Coordinates: 45°00′44″N 0°32′22″W
- Country: France
- Region: Nouvelle-Aquitaine
- Department: Gironde
- Arrondissement: Bordeaux
- Canton: La Presqu'île
- Intercommunality: Bordeaux Métropole

Government
  - Mayor (2023–2026): Gilbert Dodogaray
- Area^{1}: 28.85 km^{2} (11.14 sq mi)
- Elevation: 4 m (13 ft)
- Highest elevation: 8 m (26 ft)
- Lowest elevation: 0 m (0 ft)
- Population (2023): 3,313
  - Density: 114.8/km^{2} (297.4/sq mi)
- Time zone: UTC+01:00 (CET)
  - Summer (DST): UTC+02:00 (CEST)
- INSEE/Postal code: 33004 /33810
- ^{1} French Land Register data, which excludes lakes, ponds, glaciers > 1 km^{2} (0.386 sq mi or 247 acres) and river estuaries.

Ambès (French pronunciation: [ɑ̃bɛs]; Occitan: Ambés) is a commune in the Gironde department in southwestern France.

It is located at the point, the Bec d'Ambès (Occ. bèc is cognate with Old English bæc for beck), where the rivers Garonne and Dordogne meet to form the Gironde estuary.

== Population ==
Historical population
| Year | Pop. | ±% p.a. |
|---|---|---|
| 1968 | 2,243 | — |
| 1975 | 2,545 | +1.82% |
| 1982 | 2,715 | +0.93% |
| 1990 | 2,567 | −0.70% |
| 1999 | 2,824 | +1.07% |
| 2007 | 2,931 | +0.47% |
| 2012 | 2,882 | −0.34% |
| 2017 | 3,128 | +1.65% |
| 2023 | 3,313 | +0.96% |
Source: INSEE

== See also ==
- Communes of the Gironde department

== Gallery ==
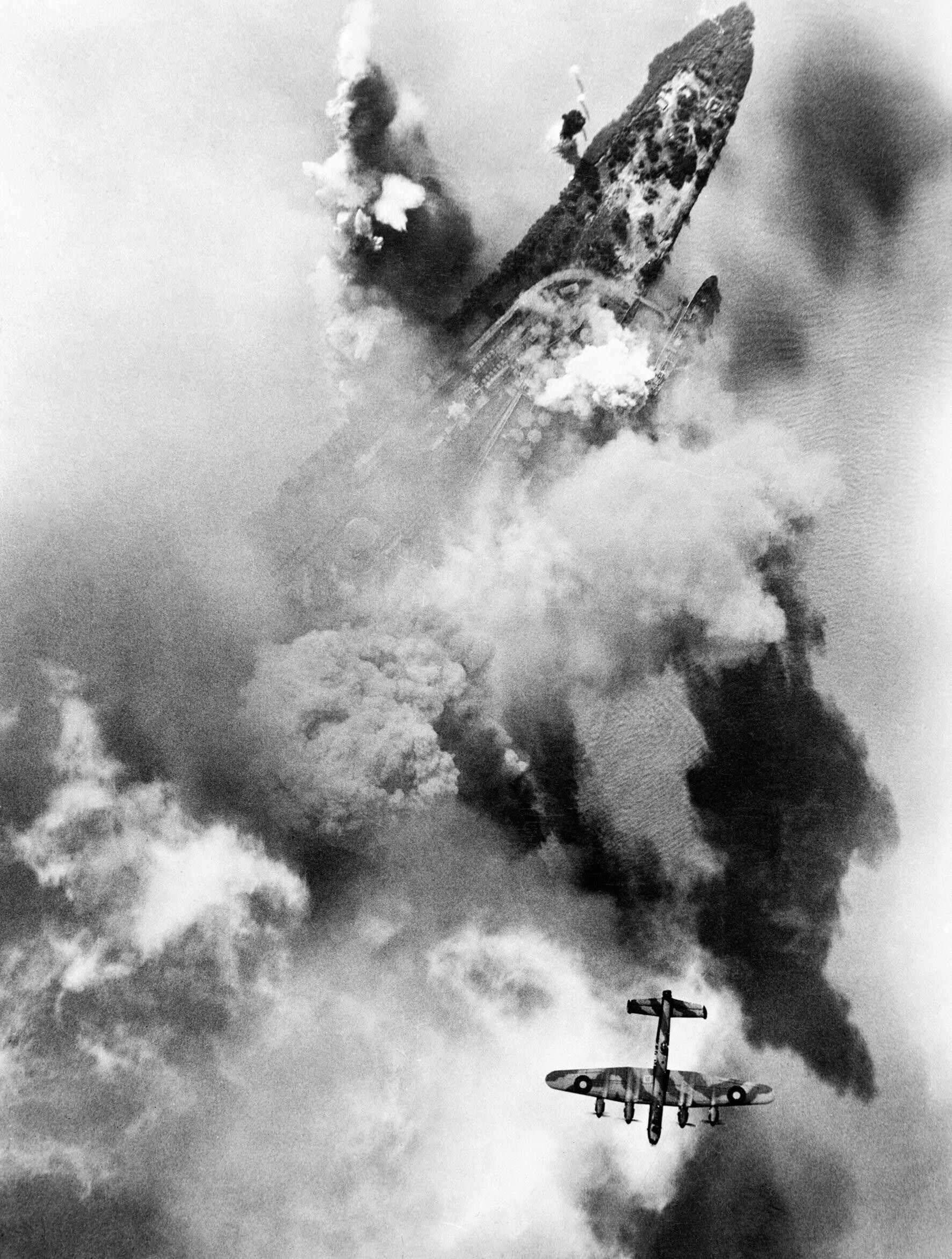
An Avro Lancaster of No. 514 Squadron RAF over the target during a Bomber Command attack on oil storage tanks at Bec d'Ambès in the Garonne estuary, 4 August 1944.
