= Saint-Caprais =

Saint-Caprais ("Saint Caprasius") may refer to the following places in France:

- Saint-Caprais, Allier, a commune in the department of Allier
- Saint-Caprais, Cher, a commune in the department of Cher
- Saint-Caprais, Gers, a commune in the department of Gers
- Saint-Caprais, Lot, a commune in the department of Lot
- Saint-Caprais-de-Blaye, a commune in the department of Gironde
- Saint-Caprais-de-Bordeaux, a commune in the department of Gironde
- Saint-Caprais-de-Lerm, a commune in the department of Lot-et-Garonne
