= Cambes =

Cambes may refer to several communes in France:

- Cambes, Gironde, in the Gironde département
- Cambes, Lot, in the Lot département
- Cambes, Lot-et-Garonne, in the Lot-et-Garonne département
- Cambes-en-Plaine, in the Calvados département
