= Carignan-de-Bordeaux =

- Commune
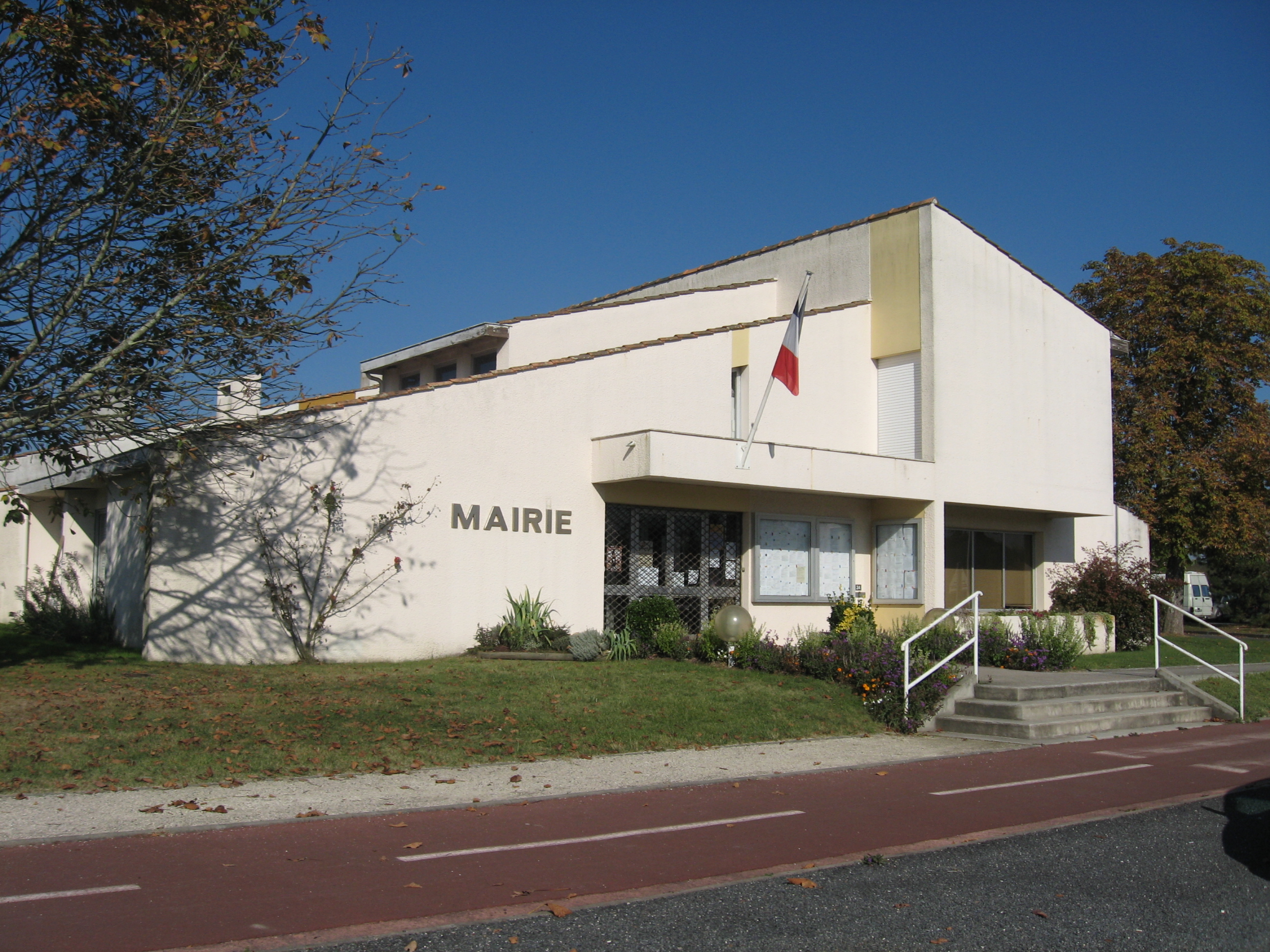
- The town hall in Carignan-de-Bordeaux

- Coat of arms
- Location of Carignan-de-Bordeaux
- Location within France Location within Nouvelle-Aquitaine
- Coordinates: 44°48′57″N 0°28′24″W
- Country: France
- Region: Nouvelle-Aquitaine
- Department: Gironde
- Arrondissement: Bordeaux
- Canton: Créon
- Intercommunality: Coteaux Bordelais

Government
  - Mayor (2020–2026): Thierry Genetay
- Area^{1}: 8.78 km^{2} (3.39 sq mi)
- Elevation: 80 m (260 ft)
- Highest elevation: 86 m (282 ft)
- Lowest elevation: 10 m (33 ft)
- Population (2023): 4,388
  - Density: 500/km^{2} (1,290/sq mi)
- Time zone: UTC+01:00 (CET)
  - Summer (DST): UTC+02:00 (CEST)
- INSEE/Postal code: 33099 /33360
- ^{1} French Land Register data, which excludes lakes, ponds, glaciers > 1 km^{2} (0.386 sq mi or 247 acres) and river estuaries.

Carignan-de-Bordeaux (French pronunciation: [kaʁiɲɑ̃ də bɔʁdo], literally Carignan of Bordeaux; Occitan: Carinhan de Bordèu) is a commune in the Gironde department in Nouvelle-Aquitaine in southwestern France. Château Beaugey is located within the commune.

== Population ==
Historical population
Year	Pop.	±% p.a.
1968	1,209	—
1975	1,931	+6.92%
1982	2,276	+2.38%
1990	2,867	+2.93%
1999	3,094	+0.85%
2007	3,376	+1.10%
2012	3,743	+2.09%
2017	3,859	+0.61%
2023	4,388	+2.16%
Source: INSEE

== See also ==
- Communes of the Gironde department
