= Loupe (surname) =

- Pronunciation: French: [lup]

Origin
- Language: French
- Meaning: a person from Loupes or La Loupe
- Region of origin: France

Loupe is a locational surname of French origin, which originally meant a person from Loupes or La Loupe in France. The name may refer to:

- Andrew Loupe (born 1988), American golfer

== See also ==
- Loup (surname)
- Loupe, a small magnification device
