= Fortified house =

Type of medieval residence

A fortified house or fortified mansion, from French maison forte, is a type of building which developed in Europe during the Middle Ages, generally with significant fortifications added. During the earlier Roman period it was common for wealthy landowners to construct unfortified villas on their lands. After the fall of Rome, increased social instability and military conflict necessitated more austere, defensible types of structures. A castle is a type of particularly well-fortified residence. In English-language academic works of castellology, the French term maison-forte is also used, more seldom unhyphenated (maison forte).

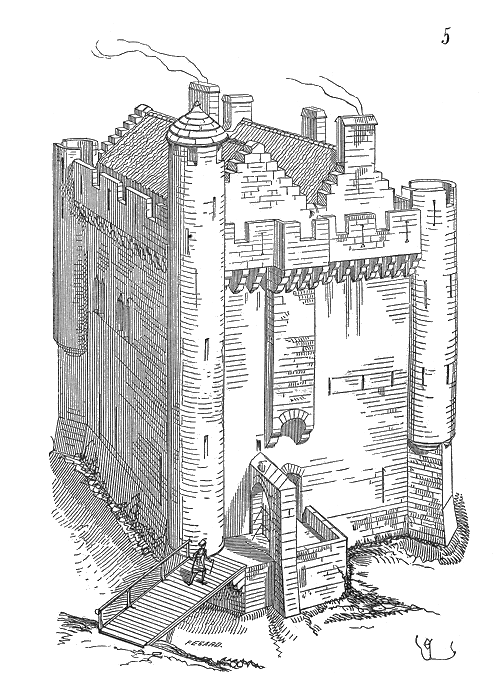
Fortified house in Camarsac, 14th century (artist's impression by Viollet-le-Duc)

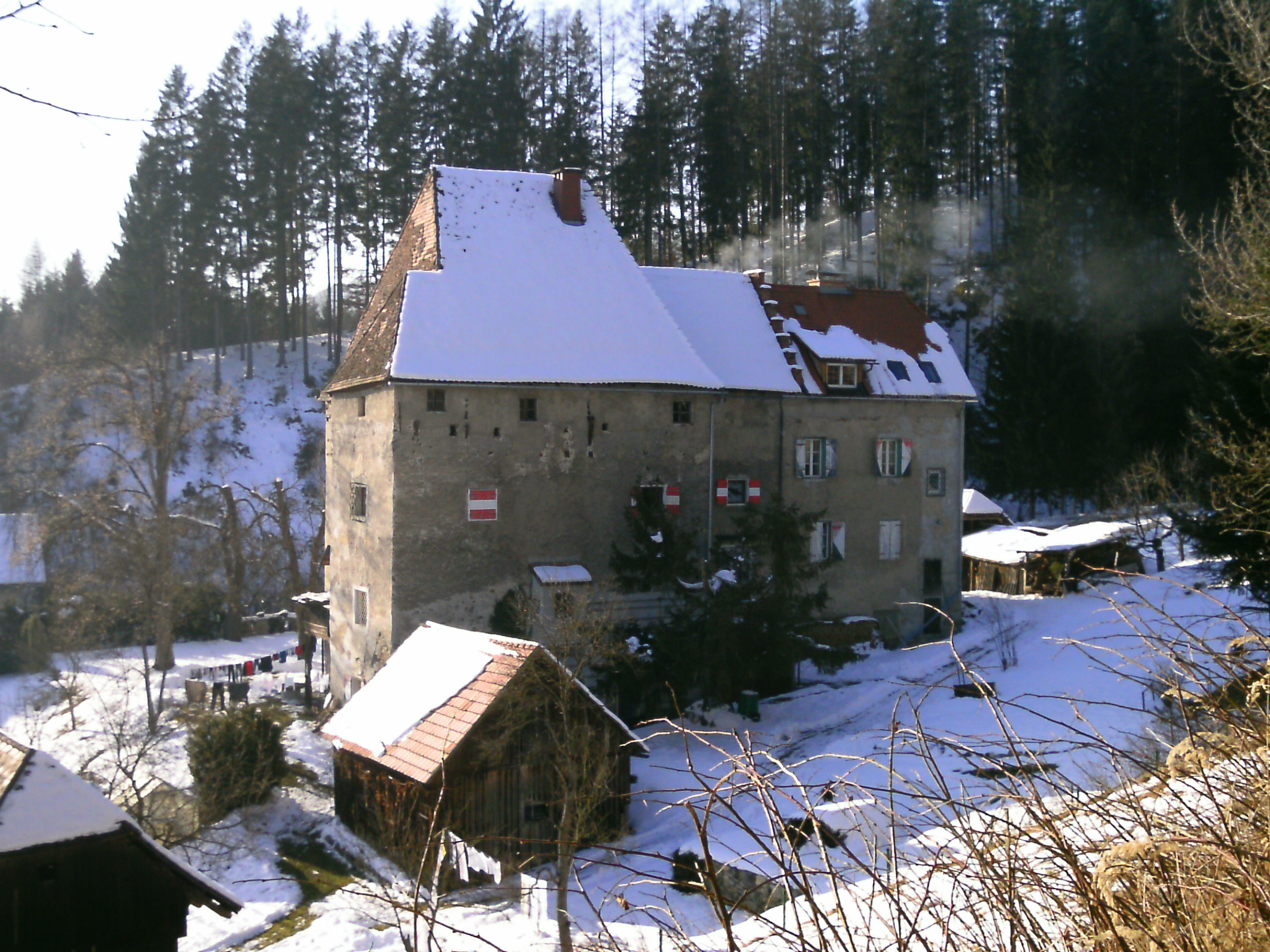
Schloss Hart by the Harter Graben near Kindberg, Austria

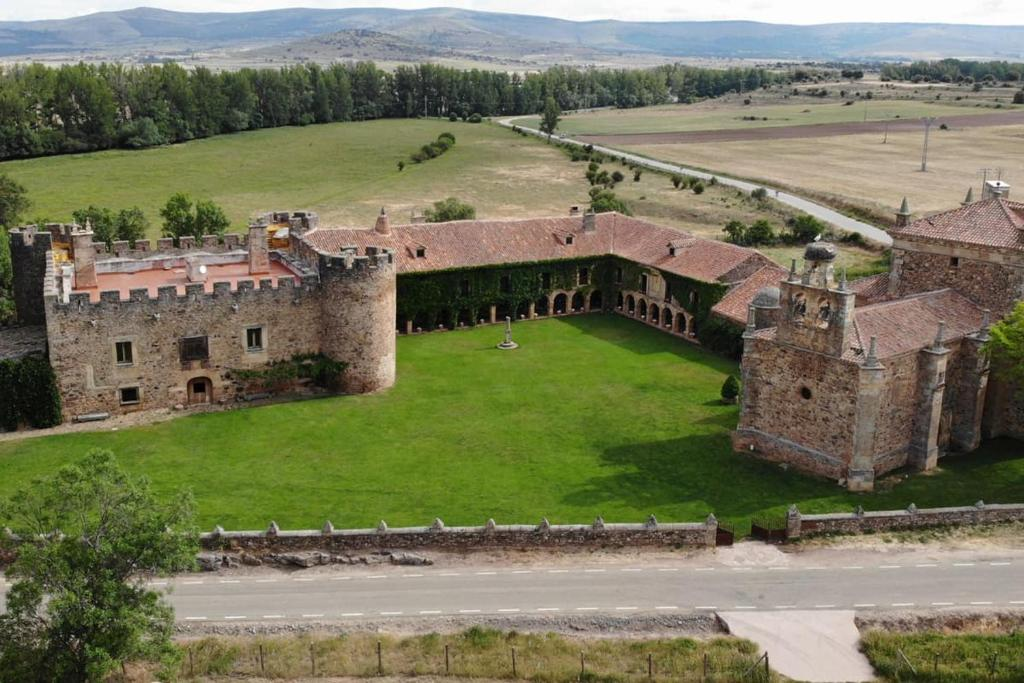
Fortified house of San Gregorio (Casa Fuerte de San Gregorio) in Almarza

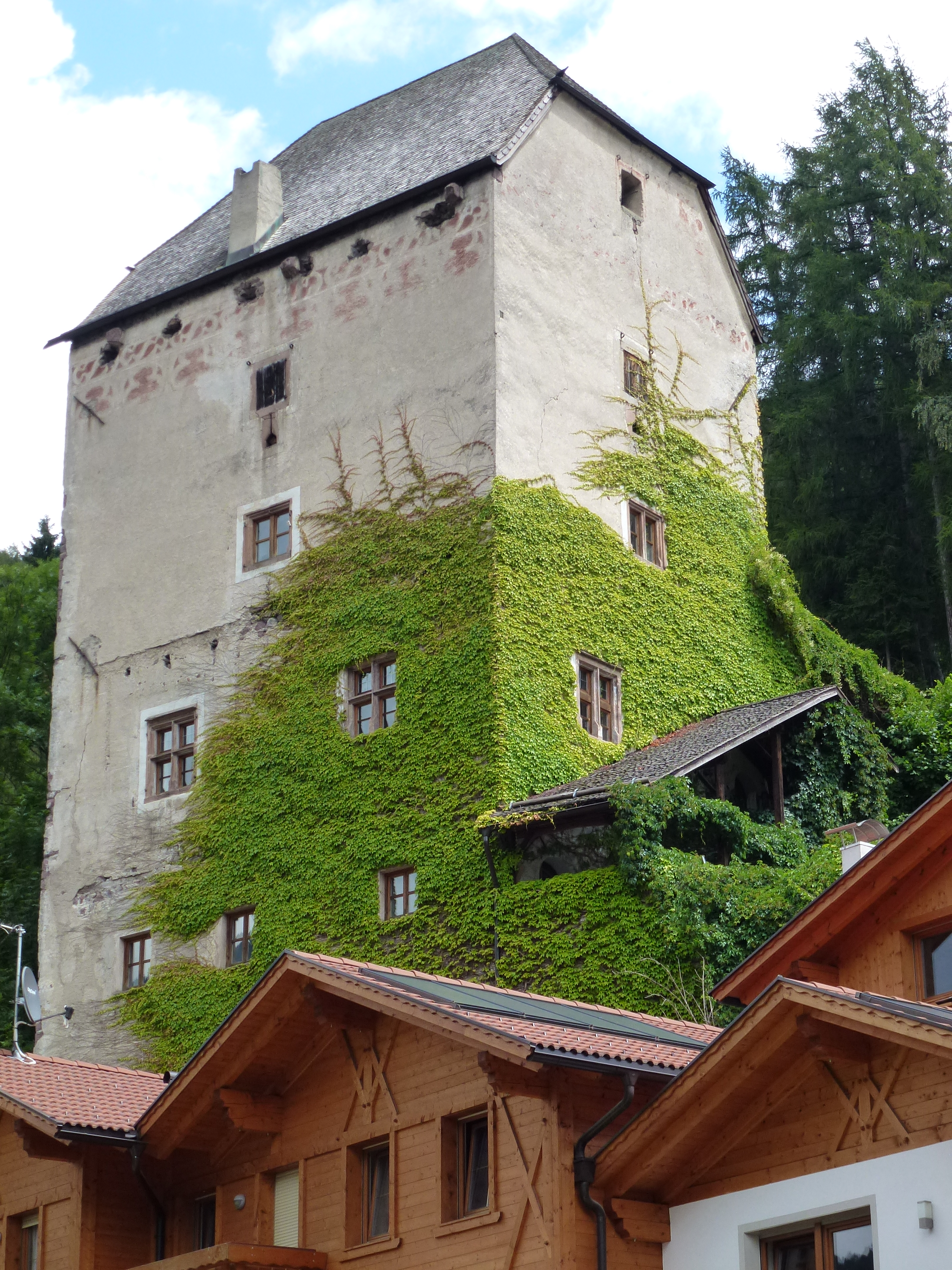
Kränzelstein in Sarnthein, South Tyrol

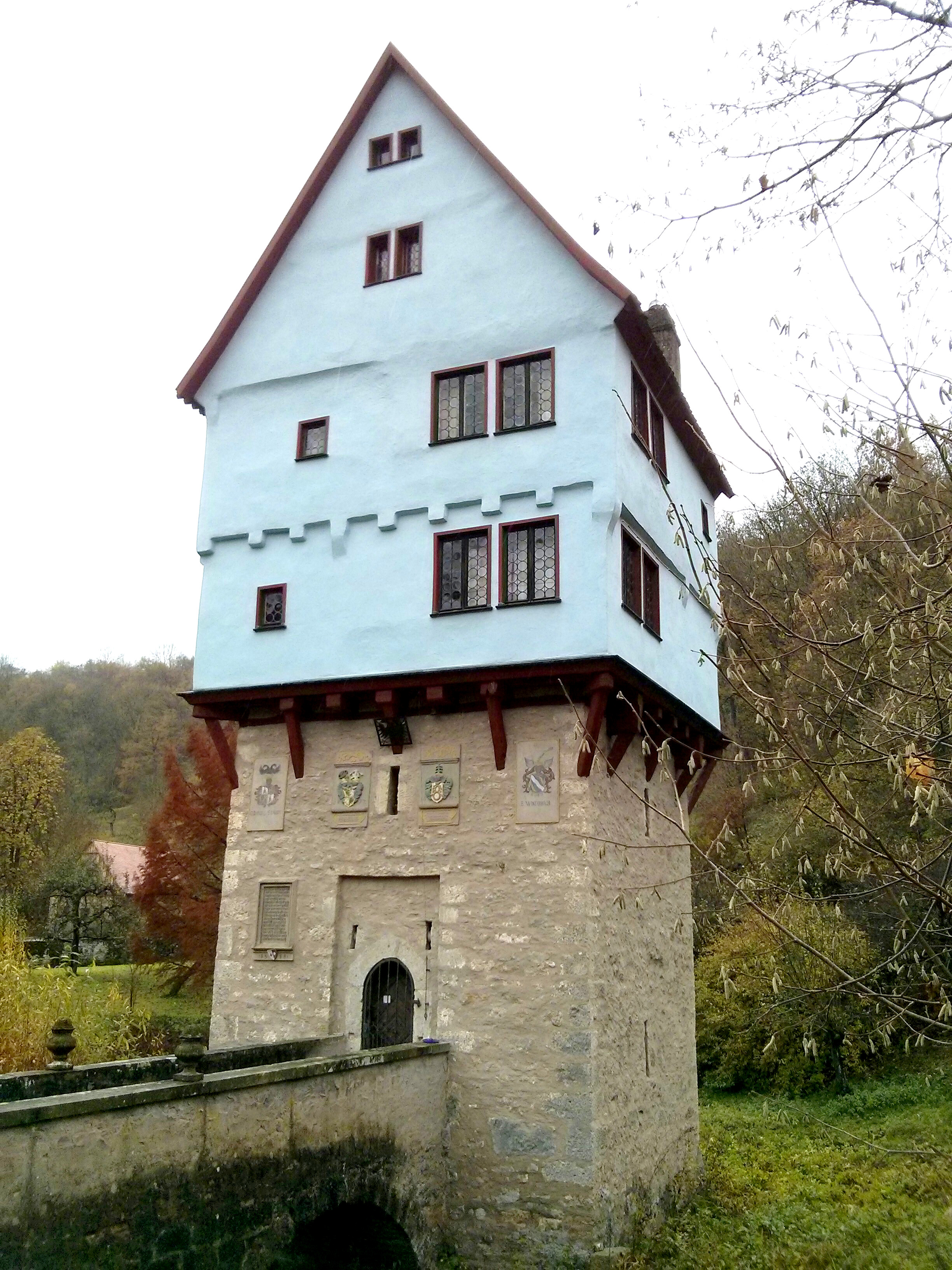
Topplerschlösschen in Fuchmühle, Rothenburg ob der Tauber, Bavaria, Germany

== See also ==
- Bastle house, fortified farmhouses on the Anglo-Scottish border
- Block house
- Fortified houses in Ireland
- Fortification: Frontier forts in N America, including forts, stations and fortified homesteads
- Manor house
- Tower house

== Literature ==
- Bur, Michel (1986). "La maison forte au Moyen Age" (in French). Actes de la table ronde de Nancy, Pont-à-Mousson, 1984, Paris: Ed. CNRS.
- Cayot, Fabrice (2003). "Les maisons seigneuriales rurales à la fin du Moyen Age (XIVe–XVIe s.) dans l'Yonne" (in French). Annales de Bourgogne, 75, pp. 259–288.
- Mouillebouche, Hervé (2002). Les maisons fortes en Bourgogne du Nord du XIIIe au XVIe siècle (in French). Dijon: EUD.
