= Haux =

Haux may refer to:

- Haux, Gironde, a commune in France
- Haux, Pyrénées-Atlantiques, a commune in France
- Villa Haux, a monument in Germany
