= Arrondissement of Bordeaux =

Bordeaux
- Arrondissement
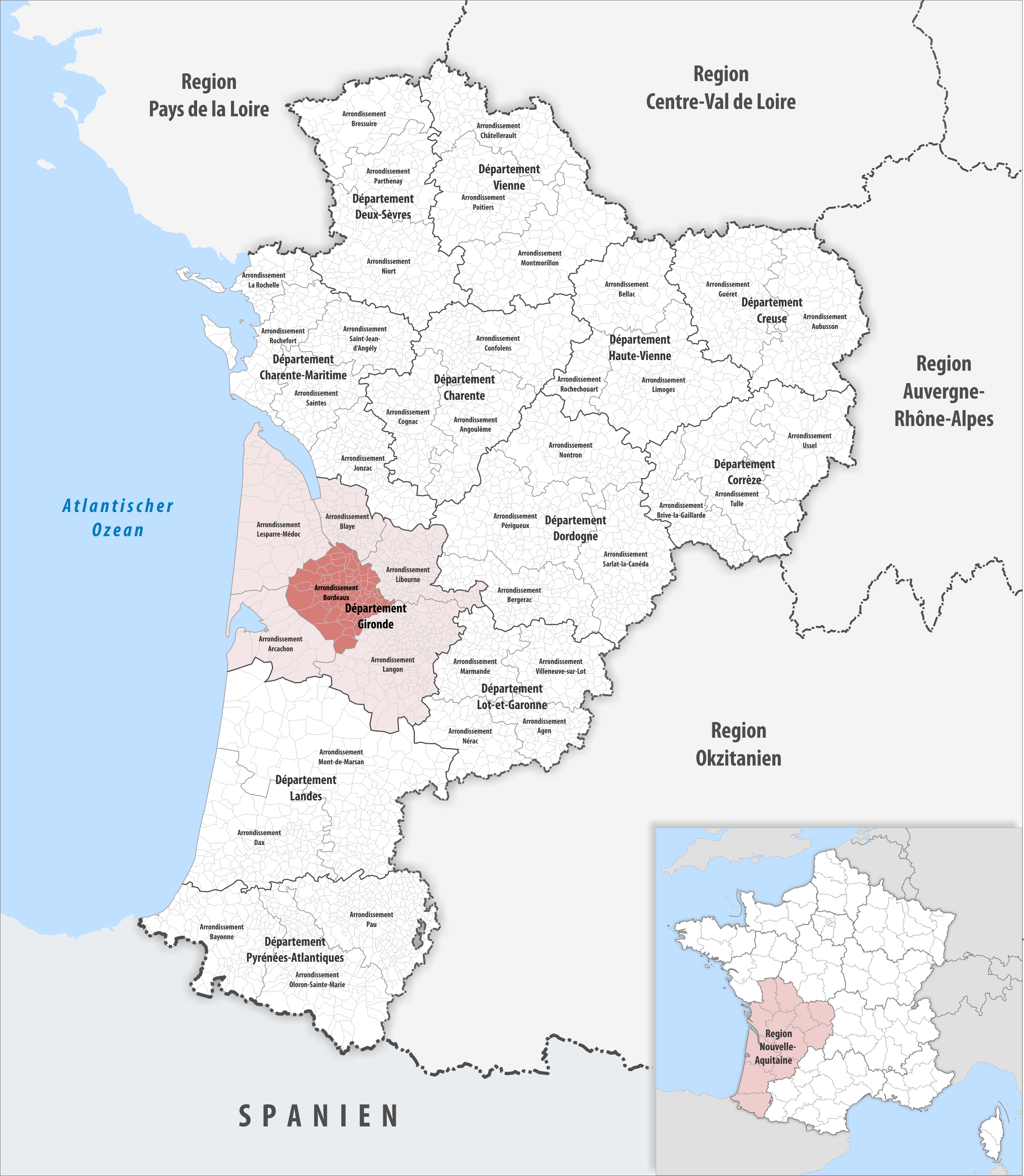
- Location within the region Nouvelle-Aquitaine
- Country: France
- Region: Nouvelle-Aquitaine
- Department: Gironde
- No. of communes: {{{nbcomm}}}
- Area: 1,521.8 km^{2} (587.6 sq mi)
- Population (2023): 1,038,899
  - Density: 682.68/km^{2} (1,768.1/sq mi)
- INSEE code: 332

The arrondissement of Bordeaux is an arrondissement of France in the Gironde department in the Nouvelle-Aquitaine region. It has 82 communes. Its population is 1,013,121 (2021), and its area is 1,521.8 km^{2} (587.6 sq mi).

== Composition ==
The communes of the arrondissement of Bordeaux, and their INSEE codes, are:

1. Ambarès-et-Lagrave (33003)
2. Ambès (33004)
3. Artigues-près-Bordeaux (33013)
4. Ayguemorte-les-Graves (33023)
5. Bassens (33032)
6. Baurech (33033)
7. Beautiran (33037)
8. Bègles (33039)
9. Beychac-et-Caillau (33049)
10. Blanquefort (33056)
11. Blésignac (33059)
12. Bonnetan (33061)
13. Bordeaux (33063)
14. Bouliac (33065)
15. Le Bouscat (33069)
16. La Brède (33213)
17. Bruges (33075)
18. Cabanac-et-Villagrains (33077)
19. Cadaujac (33080)
20. Camarsac (33083)
21. Cambes (33084)
22. Camblanes-et-Meynac (33085)
23. Canéjan (33090)
24. Carbon-Blanc (33096)
25. Carignan-de-Bordeaux (33099)
26. Castres-Gironde (33109)
27. Cénac (33118)
28. Cenon (33119)
29. Cestas (33122)
30. Créon (33140)
31. Croignon (33141)
32. Cursan (33145)
33. Eysines (33162)
34. Fargues-Saint-Hilaire (33165)
35. Floirac (33167)
36. Gradignan (33192)
37. Le Haillan (33200)
38. Haux (33201)
39. Isle-Saint-Georges (33206)
40. Latresne (33234)
41. Léognan (33238)
42. Lignan-de-Bordeaux (33245)
43. Lormont (33249)
44. Loupes (33252)
45. Ludon-Médoc (33256)
46. Macau (33262)
47. Madirac (33263)
48. Martignas-sur-Jalle (33273)
49. Martillac (33274)
50. Mérignac (33281)
51. Montussan (33293)
52. Parempuyre (33312)
53. Pessac (33318)
54. Le Pian-Médoc (33322)
55. Pompignac (33330)
56. Le Pout (33335)
57. Quinsac (33349)
58. Sadirac (33363)
59. Saint-Aubin-de-Médoc (33376)
60. Saint-Caprais-de-Bordeaux (33381)
61. Sainte-Eulalie (33397)
62. Saint-Genès-de-Lombaud (33408)
63. Saint-Jean-d'Illac (33422)
64. Saint-Léon (33431)
65. Saint-Loubès (33433)
66. Saint-Louis-de-Montferrand (33434)
67. Saint-Médard-d'Eyrans (33448)
68. Saint-Médard-en-Jalles (33449)
69. Saint-Morillon (33454)
70. Saint-Selve (33474)
71. Saint-Sulpice-et-Cameyrac (33483)
72. Saint-Vincent-de-Paul (33487)
73. Sallebœuf (33496)
74. Saucats (33501)
75. La Sauve (33505)
76. Tabanac (33518)
77. Le Taillan-Médoc (33519)
78. Talence (33522)
79. Le Tourne (33534)
80. Tresses (33535)
81. Villenave-d'Ornon (33550)
82. Yvrac (33554)

== History ==
The arrondissement of Bordeaux was created in 1800. At the May 2006 reorganisation of the arrondissements of Gironde, it lost the canton of Saint-André-de-Cubzac to the arrondissement of Blaye, the cantons of Cadillac and Podensac to the arrondissement of Langon and the canton of Castelnau-de-Médoc to the arrondissement of Lesparre-Médoc. In January 2007 it lost the four cantons of Arcachon, Audenge, Belin-Béliet and La Teste-de-Buch to the new arrondissement of Arcachon.

As a result of the reorganisation of the cantons of France which came into effect in 2015, the borders of the cantons are no longer related to the borders of the arrondissements. The cantons of the arrondissement of Bordeaux were, as of January 2015:

1. Bègles
2. Blanquefort
3. Bordeaux-1
4. Bordeaux-2
5. Bordeaux-3
6. Bordeaux-4
7. Bordeaux-5
8. Bordeaux-6
9. Bordeaux-7
10. Bordeaux-8
11. Le Bouscat
12. La Brède
13. Carbon-Blanc
14. Cenon
15. Créon
16. Floirac
17. Gradignan
18. Lormont
19. Mérignac-1
20. Mérignac-2
21. Pessac-1
22. Pessac-2
23. Saint-Médard-en-Jalles
24. Talence
25. Villenave-d'Ornon
