= Cursan =

- Commune
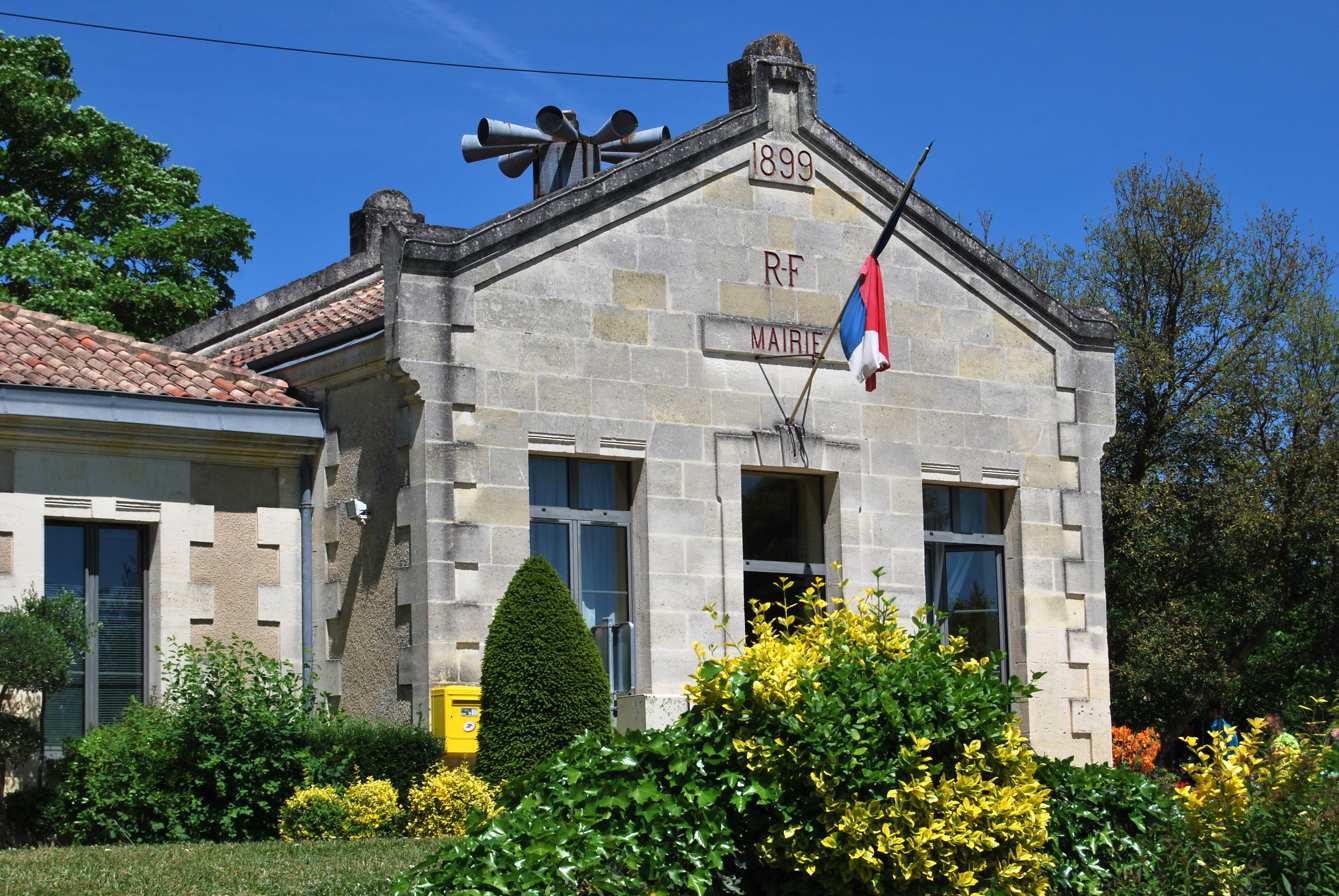
- The town hall in Cursan

- Coat of arms
- Location of Cursan
- Location within France Location within Nouvelle-Aquitaine
- Coordinates: 44°48′16″N 0°20′10″W
- Country: France
- Region: Nouvelle-Aquitaine
- Department: Gironde
- Arrondissement: Bordeaux
- Canton: Créon
- Intercommunality: Créonnais

Government
  - Mayor (2020–2026): Ludovic Caurraze
- Area^{1}: 6.07 km^{2} (2.34 sq mi)
- Elevation: 80 m (260 ft)
- Highest elevation: 109 m (358 ft)
- Lowest elevation: 41 m (135 ft)
- Population (2023): 663
  - Density: 109/km^{2} (283/sq mi)
- Time zone: UTC+01:00 (CET)
  - Summer (DST): UTC+02:00 (CEST)
- INSEE/Postal code: 33145 /33670
- ^{1} French Land Register data, which excludes lakes, ponds, glaciers > 1 km^{2} (0.386 sq mi or 247 acres) and river estuaries.

Cursan (French pronunciation: [kyʁsɑ̃]; Occitan: Curçan) is a commune in the Gironde department in southwestern France.

== Population ==
Historical population
Year	Pop.	±% p.a.
1968	180	—
1975	162	−1.49%
1982	413	+14.30%
1990	451	+1.11%
1999	437	−0.35%
2007	459	+0.62%
2012	560	+4.06%
2017	650	+3.03%
2023	663	+0.33%
Source: INSEE

== See also ==
- Communes of the Gironde department
