= Saint-Genès-de-Lombaud =

- Commune
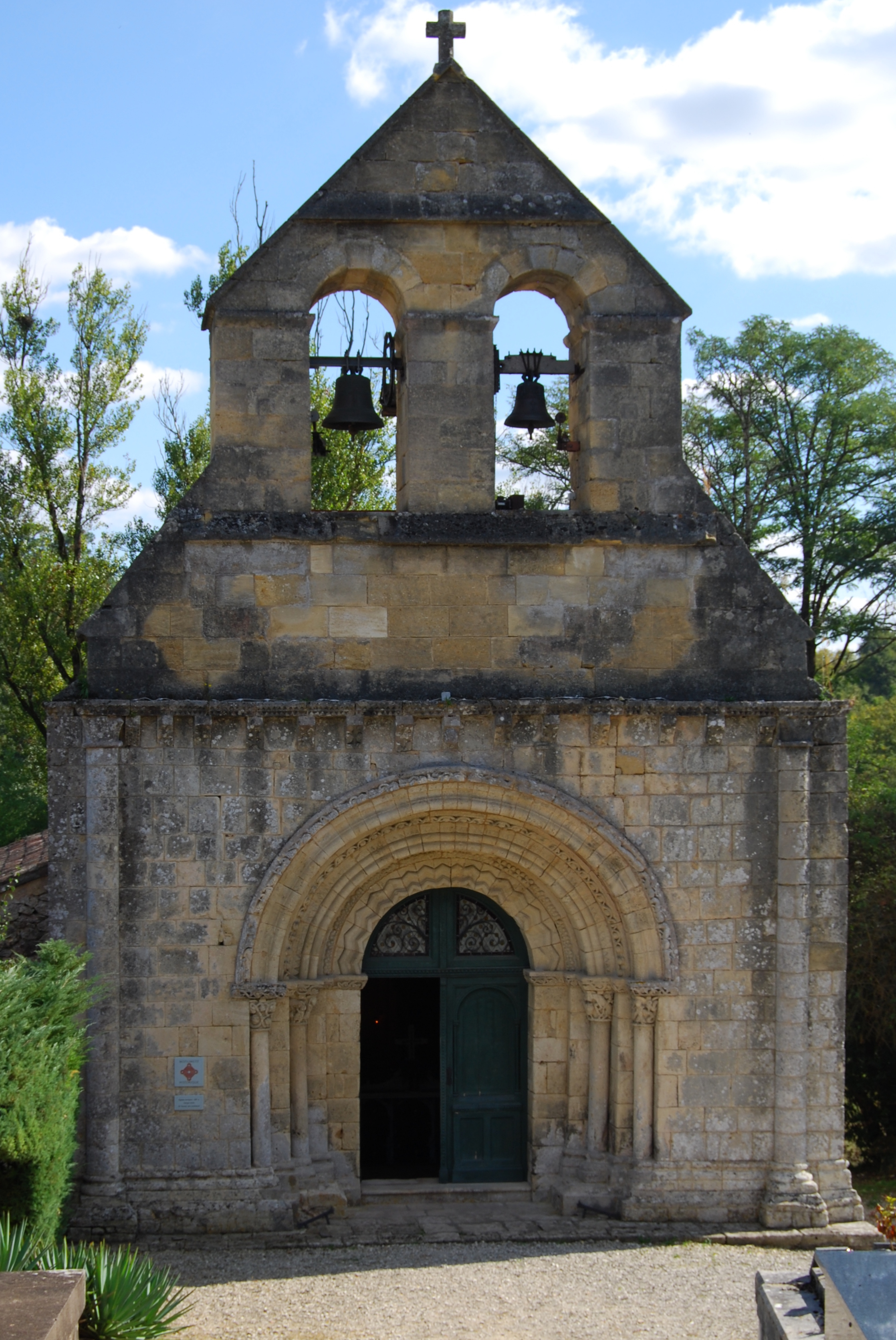
- The church in Saint-Genès-de-Lombaud

- Coat of arms
- Location of Saint-Genès-de-Lombaud
- Location within France Location within Nouvelle-Aquitaine
- Coordinates: 44°45′15″N 0°22′50″W
- Country: France
- Region: Nouvelle-Aquitaine
- Department: Gironde
- Arrondissement: Bordeaux
- Canton: Créon
- Intercommunality: Créonnais

Government
  - Mayor (2020–2026): Maryvonne Lafon
- Area^{1}: 6.14 km^{2} (2.37 sq mi)
- Elevation: 86 m (282 ft)
- Highest elevation: 99 m (325 ft)
- Lowest elevation: 22 m (72 ft)
- Population (2023): 394
  - Density: 64.2/km^{2} (166/sq mi)
- Time zone: UTC+01:00 (CET)
  - Summer (DST): UTC+02:00 (CEST)
- INSEE/Postal code: 33408 /33670
- ^{1} French Land Register data, which excludes lakes, ponds, glaciers > 1 km^{2} (0.386 sq mi or 247 acres) and river estuaries.

Saint-Genès-de-Lombaud is a commune in the Gironde department in Nouvelle-Aquitaine in southwestern France.

== History ==
The town’s centerpiece is its Romanesque church, which dates back to at least the 12th century. The church was once a pilgrimage site dedicated to the Vierge Noire (Black Virgin) and features a unique entryway with two staircases, showcasing a statue of the Virgin attributed to the 13th century. Among its distinctive art pieces is a Renaissance-era high relief of God the Father, along with a mural from 1507 depicting Saint Urbain and other figures.

Beyond its religious sites, Saint-Genès-de-Lombaud also preserves a medieval motte, a raised earthwork that served as a fortification, reflecting the town's strategic historical importance during the Middle Ages.

== Population ==
Historical population
Year	Pop.	±% p.a.
1968	179	—
1975	168	−0.90%
1982	191	+1.85%
1990	205	+0.89%
1999	250	+2.23%
2007	282	+1.52%
2012	330	+3.19%
2017	391	+3.45%
2023	394	+0.13%
Source: INSEE

== See also ==
- Communes of the Gironde department
