= Lignan-de-Bordeaux =

- Commune
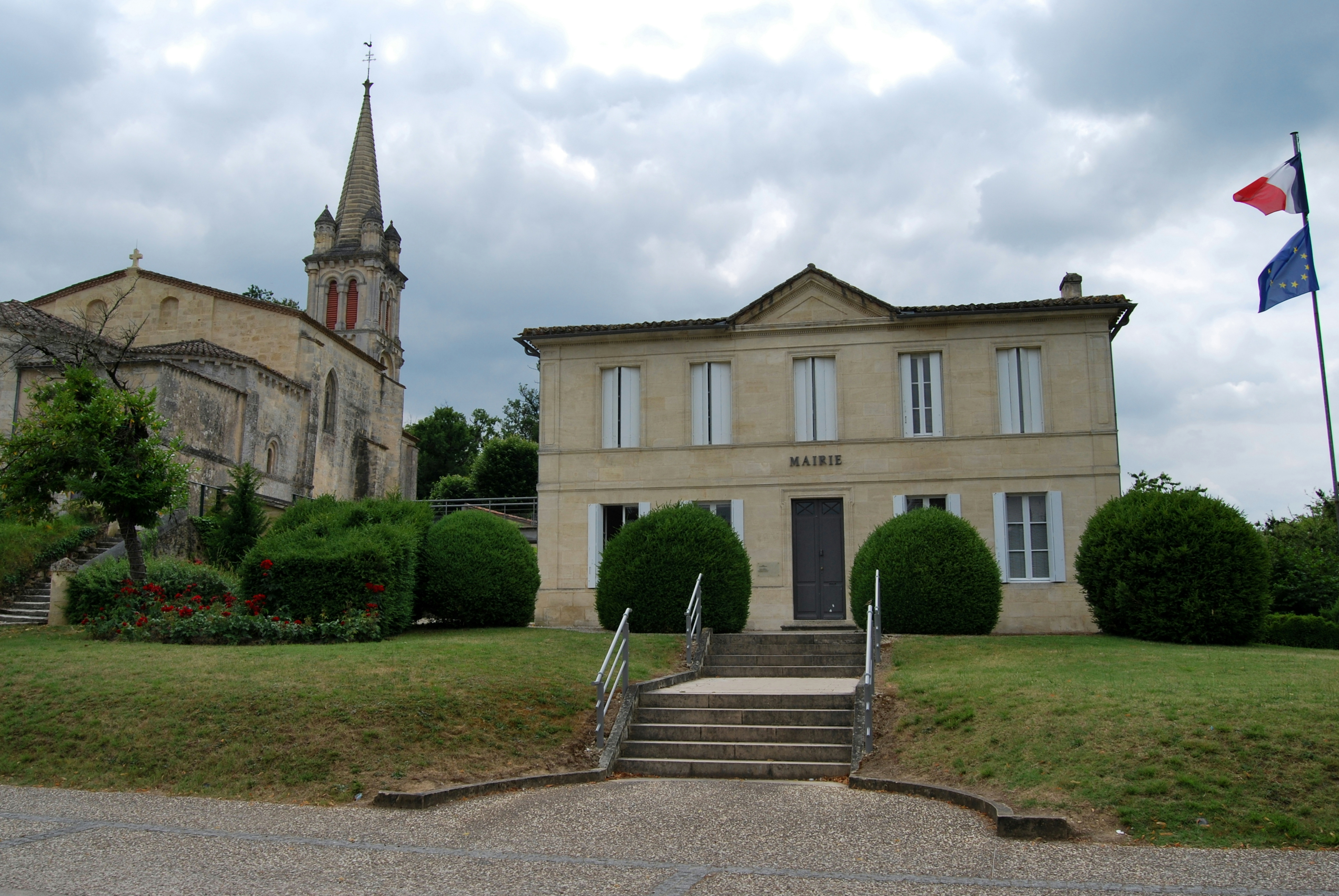
- The church and town hall in Lignan-de-Bordeaux

- Coat of arms
- Location of Lignan-de-Bordeaux
- Location within France Location within Nouvelle-Aquitaine
- Coordinates: 44°47′49″N 0°25′36″W
- Country: France
- Region: Nouvelle-Aquitaine
- Department: Gironde
- Arrondissement: Bordeaux
- Canton: Créon
- Intercommunality: Portes de l'Entre-Deux-Mers

Government
  - Mayor (2020–2026): Pierre Buisseret
- Area^{1}: 8.94 km^{2} (3.45 sq mi)
- Elevation: 54 m (177 ft)
- Highest elevation: 95 m (312 ft)
- Lowest elevation: 17 m (56 ft)
- Population (2023): 842
  - Density: 94.2/km^{2} (244/sq mi)
- Demonym(s): Lignanais, Lignanaises
- Time zone: UTC+01:00 (CET)
  - Summer (DST): UTC+02:00 (CEST)
- INSEE/Postal code: 33245 /33360
- ^{1} French Land Register data, which excludes lakes, ponds, glaciers > 1 km^{2} (0.386 sq mi or 247 acres) and river estuaries.

Lignan-de-Bordeaux (French pronunciation: [liɲɑ̃ də bɔʁdo], literally Lignan of Bordeaux; Occitan: Linhan de Bordèu) is a commune in the Gironde department in Nouvelle-Aquitaine in southwestern France.

== Population ==
Historical population
Year	Pop.	±% p.a.
1968	465	—
1975	530	+1.89%
1982	643	+2.80%
1990	722	+1.46%
1999	677	−0.71%
2007	716	+0.70%
2012	746	+0.82%
2017	822	+1.96%
2023	842	+0.40%
Source: INSEE

== See also ==
- Communes of the Gironde department
