= Madirac =

- Commune
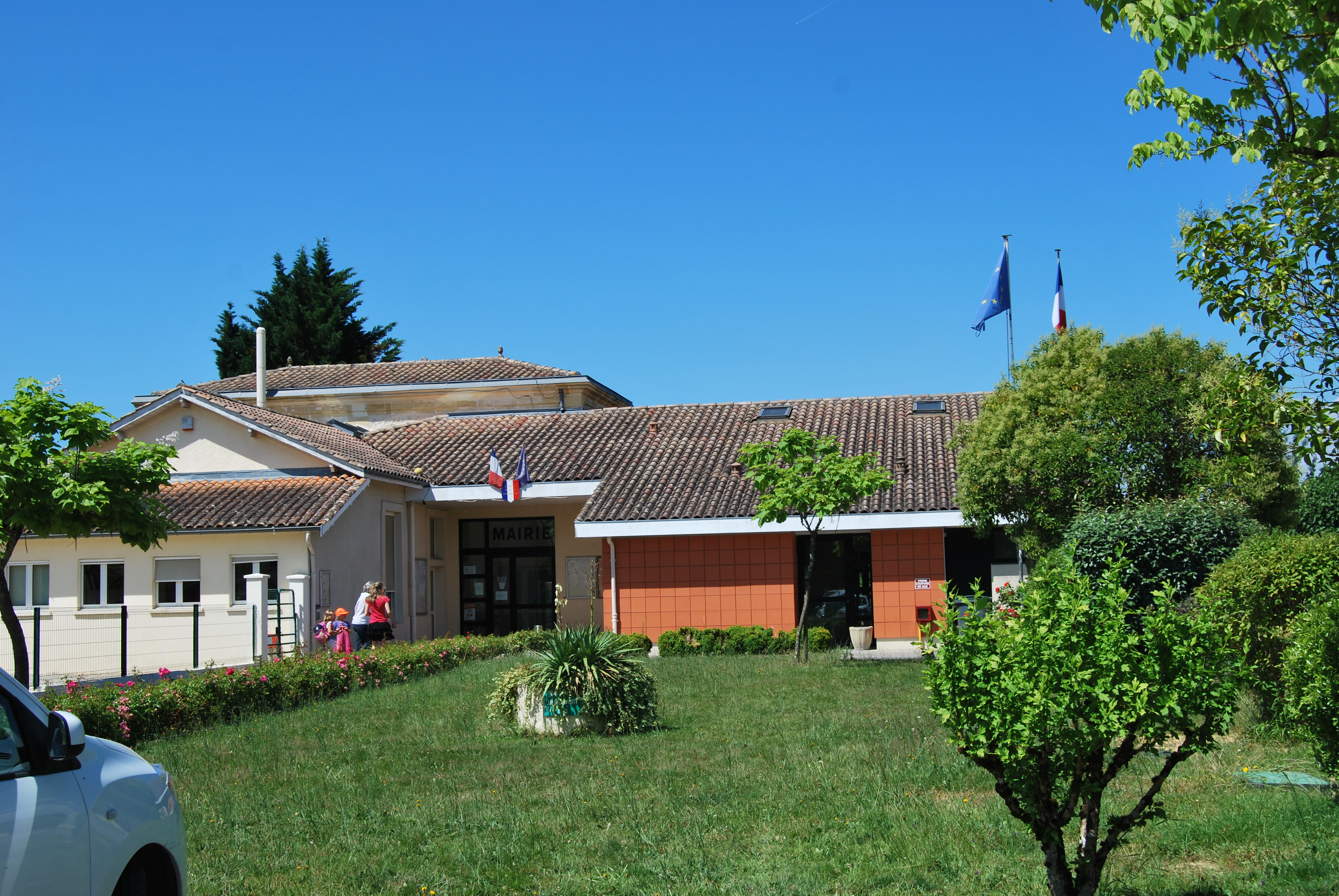
- The town hall in Madirac

- Coat of arms
- Location of Madirac
- Location within France Location within Nouvelle-Aquitaine
- Coordinates: 44°45′51″N 0°24′10″W
- Country: France
- Region: Nouvelle-Aquitaine
- Department: Gironde
- Arrondissement: Bordeaux
- Canton: Créon
- Intercommunality: Créonnais

Government
  - Mayor (2020–2026): Bernard Pagès
- Area^{1}: 1.86 km^{2} (0.72 sq mi)
- Elevation: 85 m (279 ft)
- Highest elevation: 92 m (302 ft)
- Lowest elevation: 37 m (121 ft)
- Population (2023): 307
  - Density: 165/km^{2} (427/sq mi)
- Time zone: UTC+01:00 (CET)
  - Summer (DST): UTC+02:00 (CEST)
- INSEE/Postal code: 33263 /33670
- ^{1} French Land Register data, which excludes lakes, ponds, glaciers > 1 km^{2} (0.386 sq mi or 247 acres) and river estuaries.

Madirac (French pronunciation: [madiʁak]) is a commune in the Gironde department in Nouvelle-Aquitaine in southwestern France.

== Population ==
Historical population
Year	Pop.	±% p.a.
1968	75	—
1975	78	+0.56%
1982	115	+5.70%
1990	136	+2.12%
1999	156	+1.54%
2007	195	+2.83%
2012	197	+0.20%
2017	245	+4.46%
2023	307	+3.83%
Source: INSEE

== See also ==
- Communes of the Gironde department
