= Camblanes-et-Meynac =

Camblanes-et-Meynac Camblanas e Meinac (Occitan)
- Commune
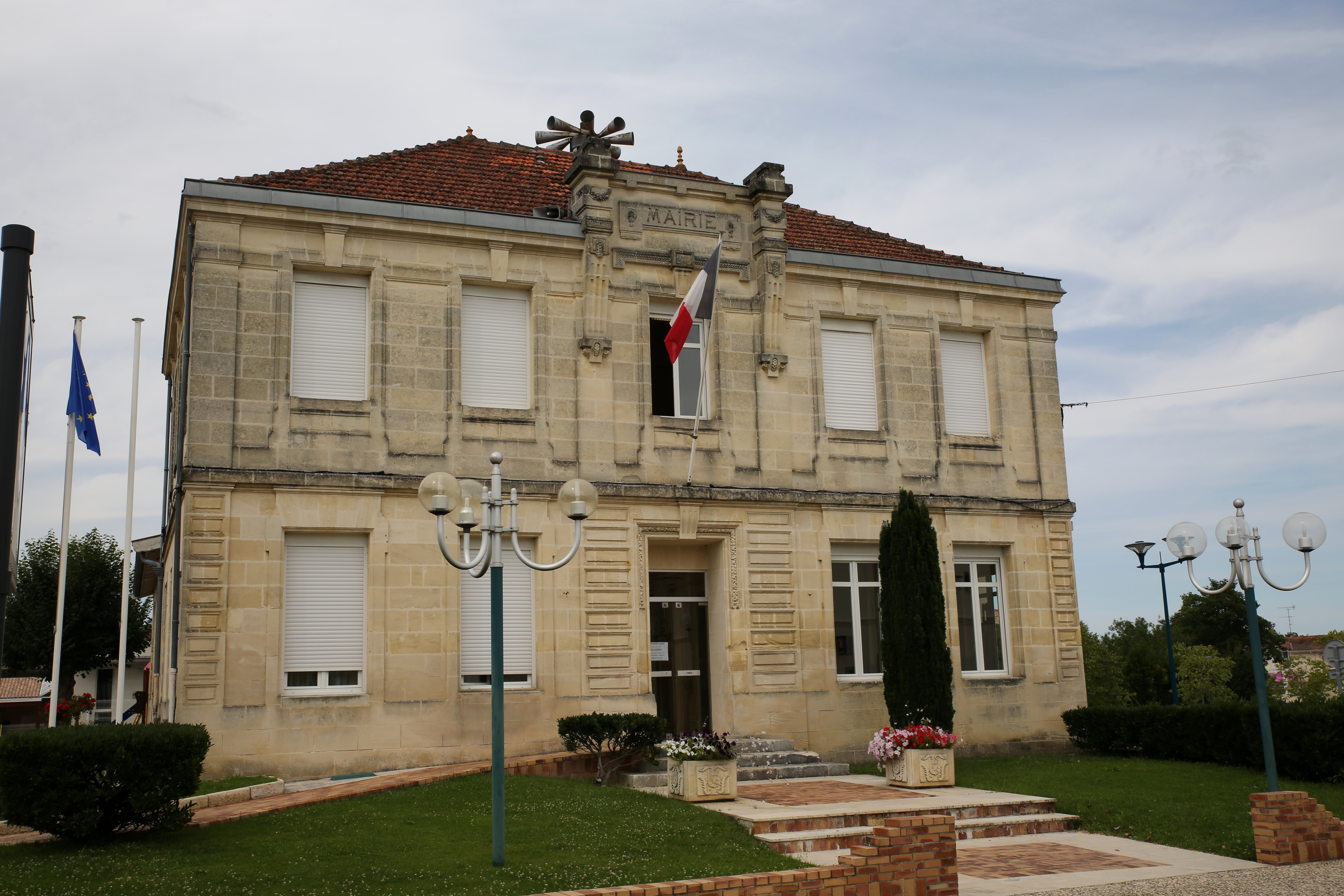
- The town hall in Camblanes

- Coat of arms
- Location of Camblanes-et-Meynac
- Location within France Location within Nouvelle-Aquitaine
- Coordinates: 44°45′57″N 0°29′11″W
- Country: France
- Region: Nouvelle-Aquitaine
- Department: Gironde
- Arrondissement: Bordeaux
- Canton: Créon
- Intercommunality: Portes de l'Entre Deux Mers

Government
  - Mayor (2020–2026): Jean-Philippe Guillemot
- Area^{1}: 8.68 km^{2} (3.35 sq mi)
- Elevation: 70 m (230 ft)
- Highest elevation: 80 m (260 ft)
- Lowest elevation: 2 m (6.6 ft)
- Population (2023): 3,181
  - Density: 366/km^{2} (949/sq mi)
- Time zone: UTC+01:00 (CET)
  - Summer (DST): UTC+02:00 (CEST)
- INSEE/Postal code: 33085 /33360
- Website: www.camblanes-et-meynac.fr
- ^{1} French Land Register data, which excludes lakes, ponds, glaciers > 1 km^{2} (0.386 sq mi or 247 acres) and river estuaries.

Camblanes-et-Meynac (French pronunciation: [kɑ̃blan e mejnak]; Occitan: Camblanas e Meinac) is a commune in the Gironde department in Nouvelle-Aquitaine in southwestern France.

== Population ==
Historical population
Year	Pop.	±% p.a.
1968	1,505	—
1975	1,742	+2.11%
1982	2,030	+2.21%
1990	1,932	−0.62%
1999	2,089	+0.87%
2007	2,561	+2.58%
2012	2,735	+1.32%
2017	2,885	+1.07%
2023	3,181	+1.64%
Source: INSEE

== See also ==
- Communes of the Gironde department
