= Pompignac =

Pompignac Pompinhac (Occitan)
- Commune
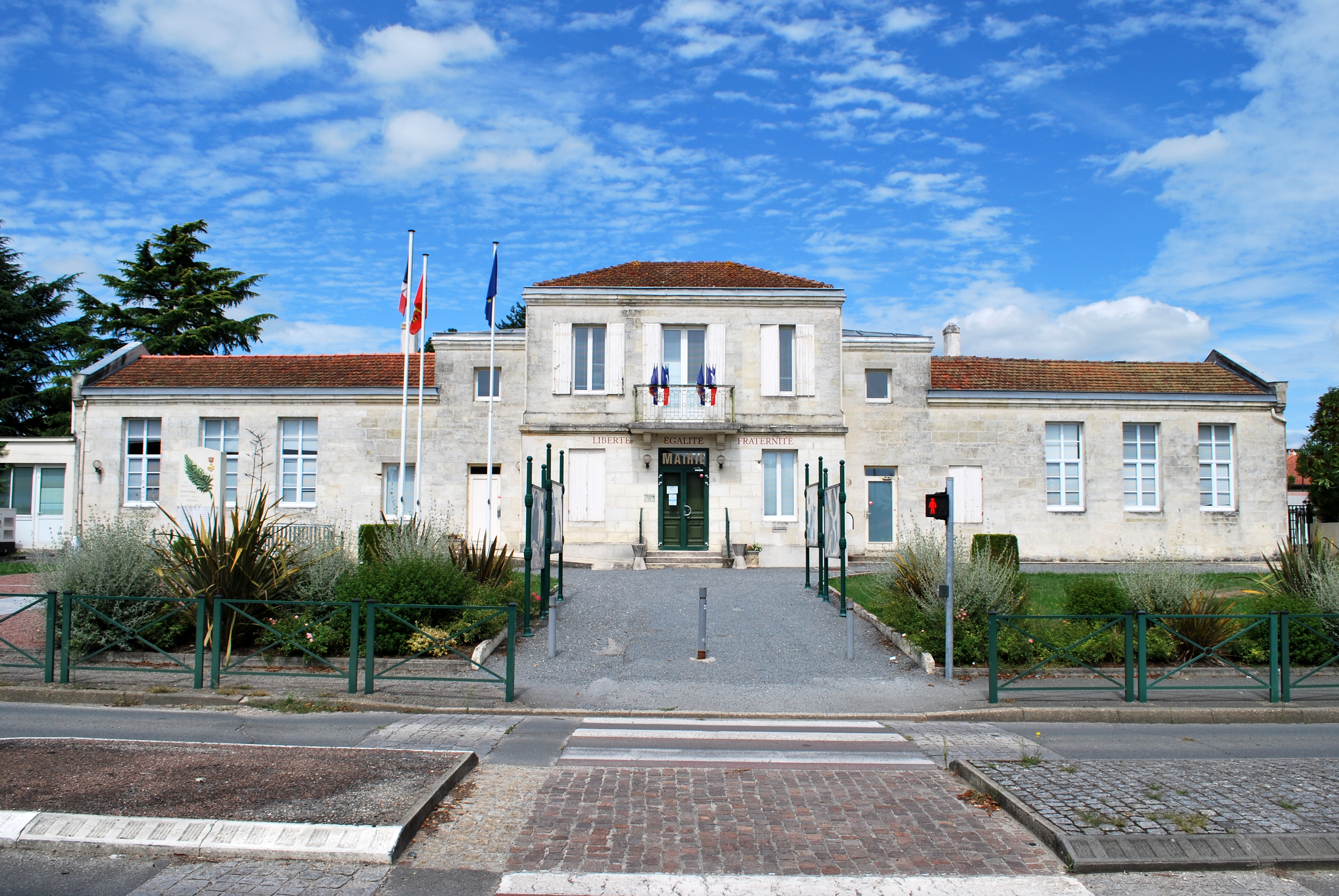
- Pompignac Town Hall

- Coat of arms
- Location of Pompignac
- Location within France Location within Nouvelle-Aquitaine
- Coordinates: 44°51′07″N 0°26′09″W
- Country: France
- Region: Nouvelle-Aquitaine
- Department: Gironde
- Arrondissement: Bordeaux
- Canton: Créon
- Intercommunality: Coteaux Bordelais

Government
  - Mayor (2020–2026): Céline Deligny-Estovert
- Area^{1}: 11.62 km^{2} (4.49 sq mi)
- Elevation: 75 m (246 ft)
- Highest elevation: 89 m (292 ft)
- Lowest elevation: 17 m (56 ft)
- Population (2023): 3,577
  - Density: 307.8/km^{2} (797.3/sq mi)
- Time zone: UTC+01:00 (CET)
  - Summer (DST): UTC+02:00 (CEST)
- INSEE/Postal code: 33330 /33370
- Website: pompignac.fr
- ^{1} French Land Register data, which excludes lakes, ponds, glaciers > 1 km^{2} (0.386 sq mi or 247 acres) and river estuaries.

Pompignac (French pronunciation: [pɔ̃piɲak]; Occitan: Pompinhac) is a commune in the Gironde department in the Nouvelle-Aquitaine region in Southwestern France.

== Geography ==
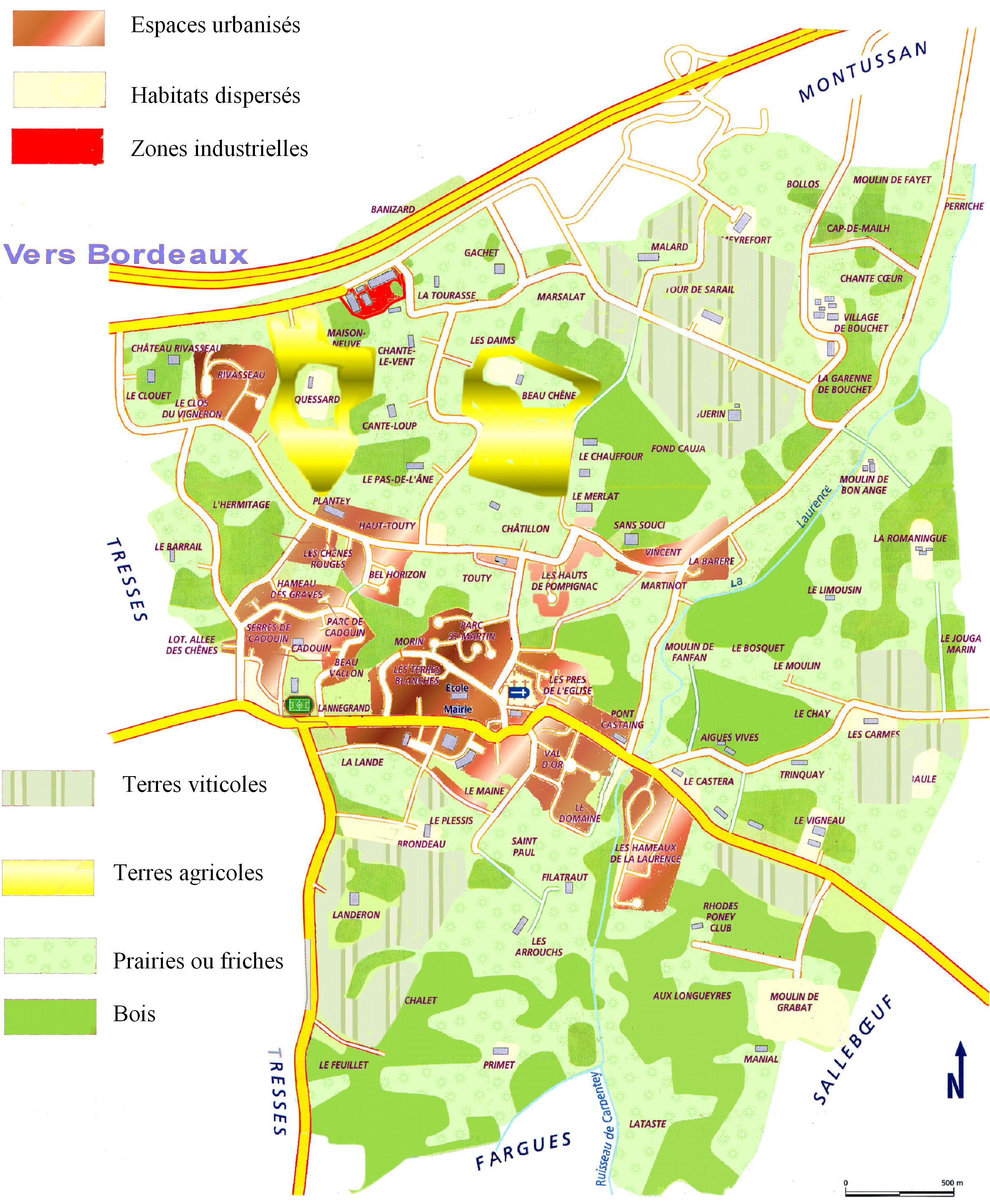
Map of Pompignac

== Demographics ==
Historical population
Year	Pop.	±% p.a.
1968	749	—
1975	1,222	+7.24%
1982	1,640	+4.29%
1990	2,355	+4.63%
1999	2,529	+0.80%
2007	2,542	+0.06%
2012	2,767	+1.71%
2017	2,980	+1.49%
2023	3,577	+3.09%
Source: INSEE

== Notable people ==
- Wim Crusio, behavioral neurogeneticist

== See also ==
- Communes of the Gironde department
