= Sallebœuf =

- Commune
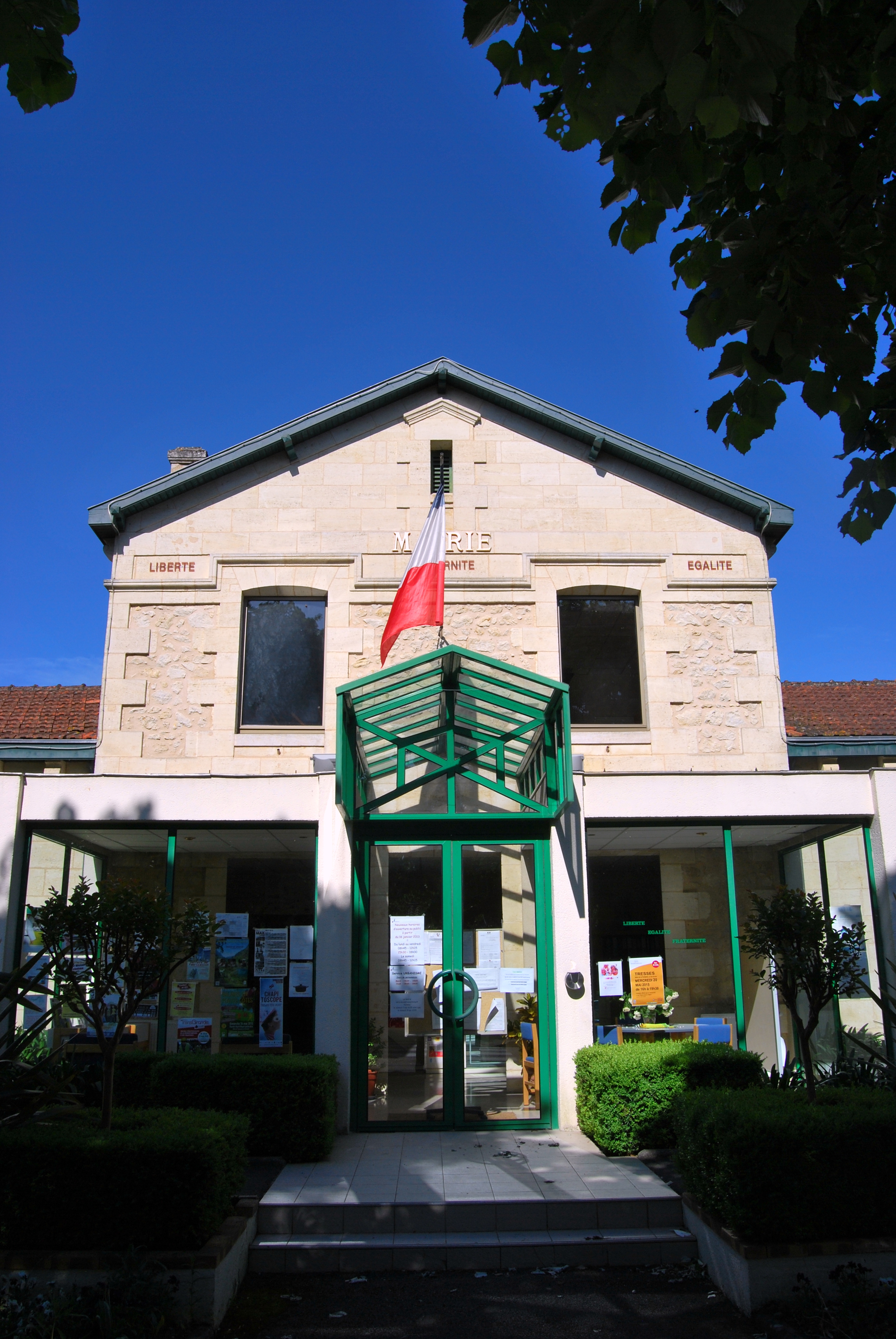
- The town hall in Sallebœuf

- Coat of arms
- Location of Sallebœuf
- Location within France Location within Nouvelle-Aquitaine
- Coordinates: 44°50′36″N 0°23′47″W
- Country: France
- Region: Nouvelle-Aquitaine
- Department: Gironde
- Arrondissement: Bordeaux
- Canton: Créon
- Intercommunality: Coteaux Bordelais

Government
  - Mayor (2020–2026): Nathalie Faber
- Area^{1}: 14.8 km^{2} (5.7 sq mi)
- Elevation: 56 m (184 ft)
- Highest elevation: 97 m (318 ft)
- Lowest elevation: 21 m (69 ft)
- Population (2023): 2,767
  - Density: 187/km^{2} (484/sq mi)
- Time zone: UTC+01:00 (CET)
  - Summer (DST): UTC+02:00 (CEST)
- INSEE/Postal code: 33496 /33370
- ^{1} French Land Register data, which excludes lakes, ponds, glaciers > 1 km^{2} (0.386 sq mi or 247 acres) and river estuaries.

Sallebœuf (French pronunciation: [salbœf]; Occitan: Salabeu) is a commune in the Gironde department in Nouvelle-Aquitaine in southwestern France.

== Population ==
Historical population
Year	Pop.	±% p.a.
1968	741	—
1975	1,085	+5.60%
1982	1,602	+5.72%
1990	1,714	+0.85%
1999	1,926	+1.30%
2007	2,042	+0.73%
2012	2,232	+1.80%
2017	2,490	+2.21%
2023	2,767	+1.77%
Source: INSEE

== See also ==
- Communes of the Gironde department
