= La Sauve =

- Commune
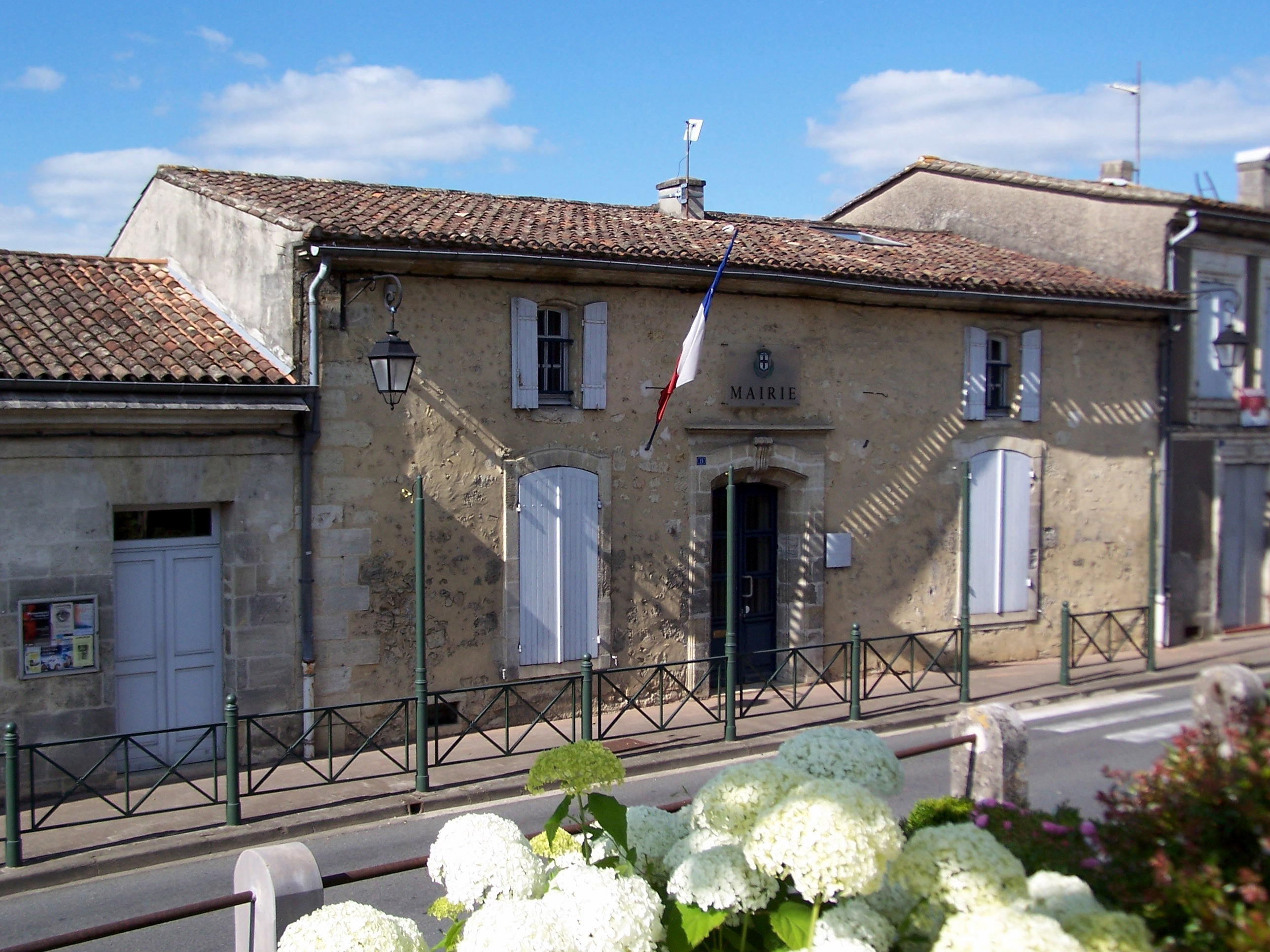
- The town hall in La Sauve

- Coat of arms
- Location of La Sauve
- Location within France Location within Nouvelle-Aquitaine
- Coordinates: 44°46′13″N 0°18′38″W
- Country: France
- Region: Nouvelle-Aquitaine
- Department: Gironde
- Arrondissement: Bordeaux
- Canton: L'Entre-Deux-Mers
- Intercommunality: Créonnais

Government
  - Mayor (2020–2026): Alain Boizard
- Area^{1}: 18.64 km^{2} (7.20 sq mi)
- Elevation: 81 m (266 ft)
- Highest elevation: 118 m (387 ft)
- Lowest elevation: 52 m (171 ft)
- Population (2023): 1,589
  - Density: 85.25/km^{2} (220.8/sq mi)
- Time zone: UTC+01:00 (CET)
  - Summer (DST): UTC+02:00 (CEST)
- INSEE/Postal code: 33505 /33670
- ^{1} French Land Register data, which excludes lakes, ponds, glaciers > 1 km^{2} (0.386 sq mi or 247 acres) and river estuaries.

La Sauve (French pronunciation: [la sov]; Occitan: La Seuva Majora) is a commune in the Gironde department in Nouvelle-Aquitaine in southwestern France.

== Population ==
Historical population
Year	Pop.	±% p.a.
1968	857	—
1975	843	−0.24%
1982	1,004	+2.53%
1990	1,100	+1.15%
1999	1,213	+1.09%
2007	1,366	+1.50%
2012	1,423	+0.82%
2017	1,483	+0.83%
2023	1,589	+1.16%
Source: INSEE

== See also ==
- Communes of the Gironde department
