= Cénac =

- Commune
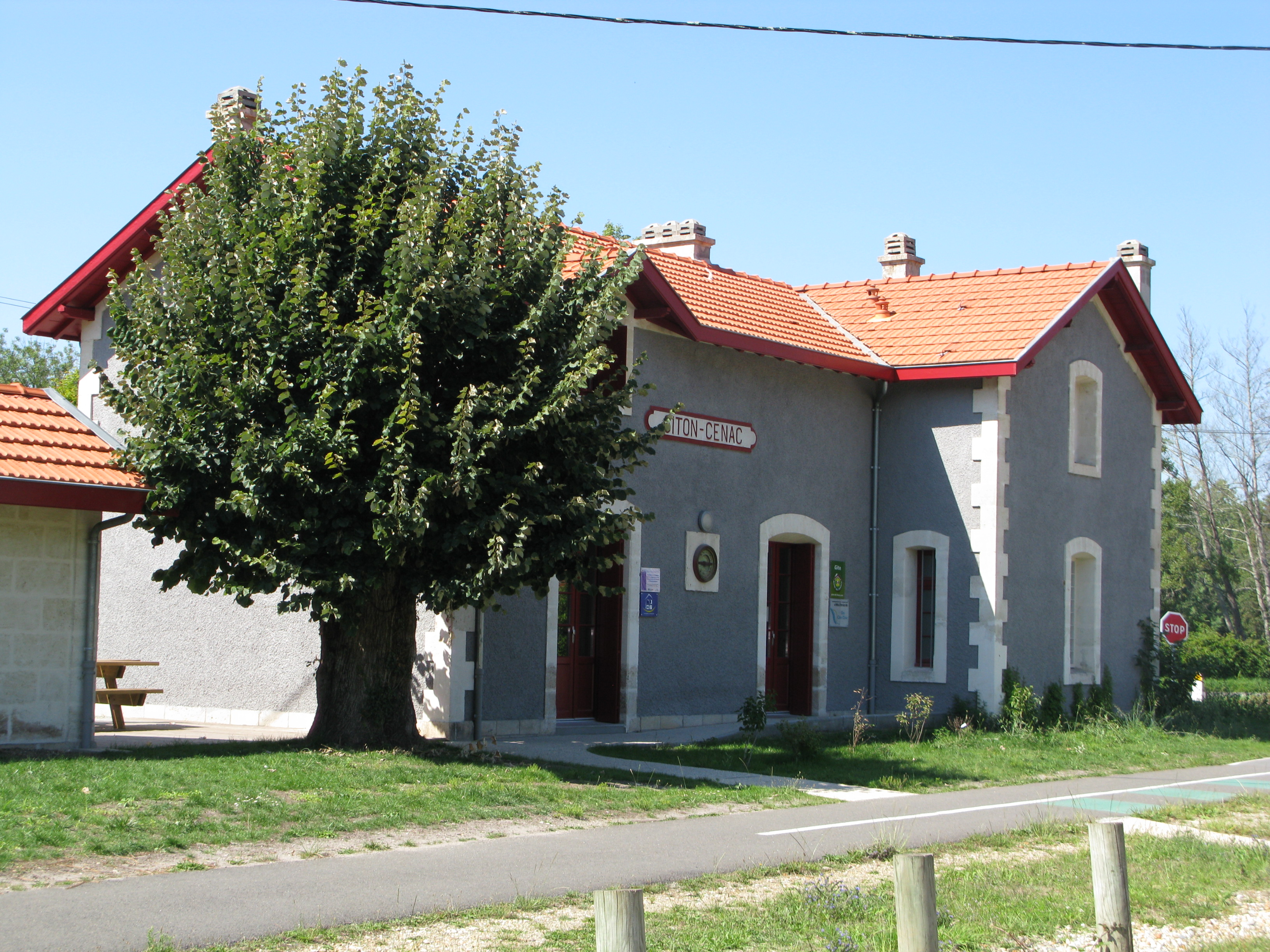
- Former train station

- Coat of arms
- Location of Cénac
- Location within France Location within Nouvelle-Aquitaine
- Coordinates: 44°46′51″N 0°27′33″W
- Country: France
- Region: Nouvelle-Aquitaine
- Department: Gironde
- Arrondissement: Bordeaux
- Canton: Créon
- Intercommunality: Portes de l'Entre Deux Mers

Government
  - Mayor (2020–2026): Catherine Veyssy
- Area^{1}: 7.5 km^{2} (2.9 sq mi)
- Elevation: 75 m (246 ft)
- Highest elevation: 82 m (269 ft)
- Lowest elevation: 7 m (23 ft)
- Population (2023): 2,195
  - Density: 290/km^{2} (760/sq mi)
- Time zone: UTC+01:00 (CET)
  - Summer (DST): UTC+02:00 (CEST)
- INSEE/Postal code: 33118 /33360
- ^{1} French Land Register data, which excludes lakes, ponds, glaciers > 1 km^{2} (0.386 sq mi or 247 acres) and river estuaries.

Cénac (French pronunciation: [senak]; Occitan: Senac) is a commune in the Gironde department in Nouvelle-Aquitaine in southwestern France.

== Population ==
Historical population
| Year | Pop. | ±% p.a. |
|---|---|---|
| 1968 | 703 | — |
| 1975 | 934 | +4.14% |
| 1982 | 1,474 | +6.74% |
| 1990 | 1,700 | +1.80% |
| 1999 | 1,806 | +0.67% |
| 2007 | 1,843 | +0.25% |
| 2012 | 1,833 | −0.11% |
| 2017 | 1,907 | +0.79% |
| 2023 | 2,195 | +2.37% |
Source: INSEE

== See also ==
- Communes of the Gironde department
