= Bonnetan =

- Commune
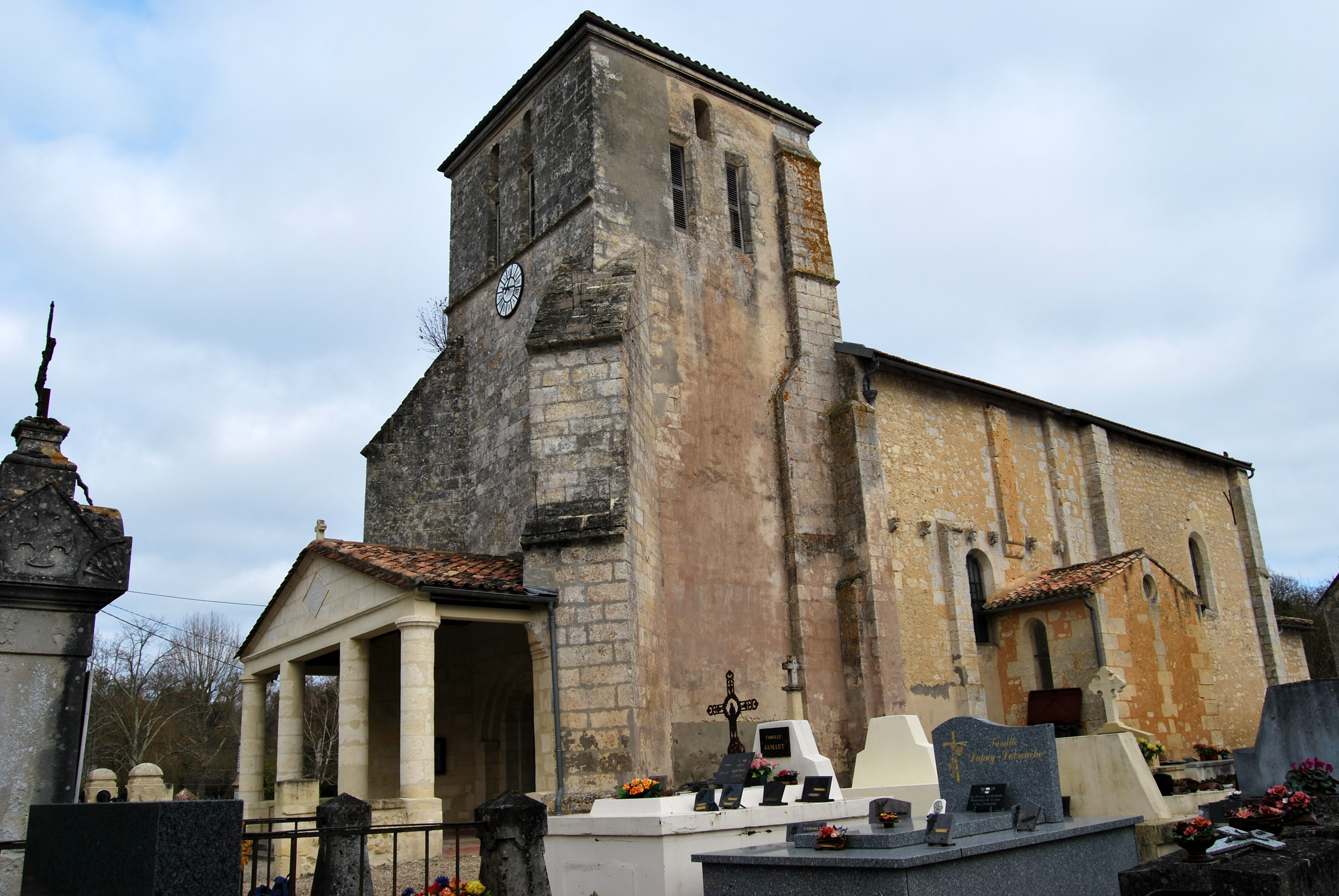
- The church in Bonnetan

- Coat of arms
- Location of Bonnetan
- Location within France Location within Nouvelle-Aquitaine
- Coordinates: 44°49′19″N 0°24′37″W
- Country: France
- Region: Nouvelle-Aquitaine
- Department: Gironde
- Arrondissement: Bordeaux
- Canton: Créon
- Intercommunality: Coteaux Bordelais

Government
  - Mayor (2020–2026): Alain Bargue
- Area^{1}: 4.29 km^{2} (1.66 sq mi)
- Elevation: 84 m (276 ft)
- Highest elevation: 100 m (330 ft)
- Lowest elevation: 34 m (112 ft)
- Population (2023): 1,065
  - Density: 248/km^{2} (643/sq mi)
- Time zone: UTC+01:00 (CET)
  - Summer (DST): UTC+02:00 (CEST)
- INSEE/Postal code: 33061 /33370
- ^{1} French Land Register data, which excludes lakes, ponds, glaciers > 1 km^{2} (0.386 sq mi or 247 acres) and river estuaries.

Bonnetan (French pronunciation: [bɔntɑ̃]; Occitan: Bonetan) is a commune in the Gironde department in Nouvelle-Aquitaine in southwestern France.

In 2002, the Tour de France went through the town.

== Population ==
Historical population
Year	Pop.	±% p.a.
1968	275	—
1975	418	+6.16%
1982	623	+5.87%
1990	679	+1.08%
1999	735	+0.88%
2007	819	+1.36%
2012	844	+0.60%
2017	947	+2.33%
2023	1,065	+1.98%
Source: INSEE

== See also ==
- Communes of the Gironde department
