= Tresses =

- Commune
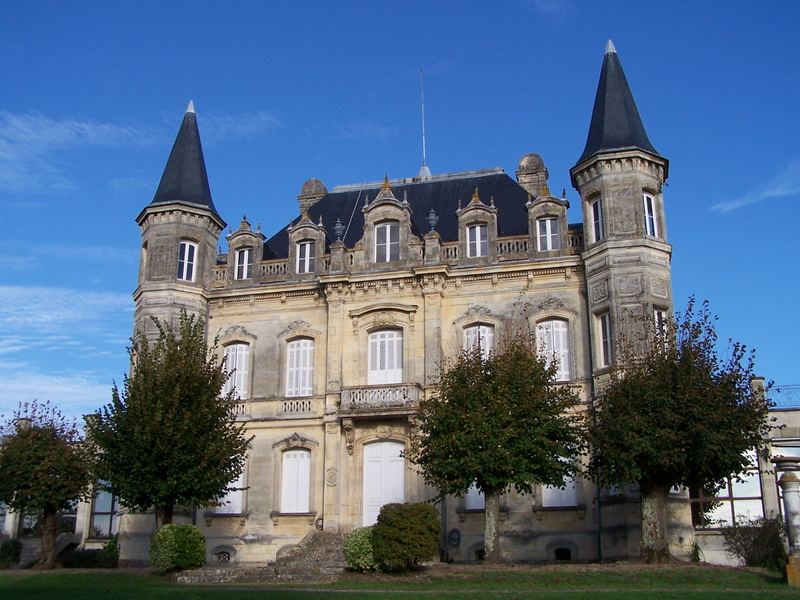
- Château la Séguinie

- Coat of arms
- Location of Tresses
- Location within France Location within Nouvelle-Aquitaine
- Coordinates: 44°50′58″N 0°27′46″W
- Country: France
- Region: Nouvelle-Aquitaine
- Department: Gironde
- Arrondissement: Bordeaux
- Canton: Créon
- Intercommunality: Coteaux Bordelais

Government
  - Mayor (2020–2026): Christian Soubie
- Area^{1}: 11.54 km^{2} (4.46 sq mi)
- Elevation: 75 m (246 ft)
- Highest elevation: 88 m (289 ft)
- Lowest elevation: 27 m (89 ft)
- Population (2023): 5,290
  - Density: 458/km^{2} (1,190/sq mi)
- Time zone: UTC+01:00 (CET)
  - Summer (DST): UTC+02:00 (CEST)
- INSEE/Postal code: 33535 /33370
- ^{1} French Land Register data, which excludes lakes, ponds, glaciers > 1 km^{2} (0.386 sq mi or 247 acres) and river estuaries.

Tresses (Occitan: Trenças) is a commune in the Gironde department in Nouvelle-Aquitaine in southwestern France.

== Population ==
Historical population

Year	Pop.	±% p.a.
1793	680	—
1800	563	−2.66%
1806	556	−0.21%
1821	575	+0.22%
1831	587	+0.21%
1836	593	+0.20%
1841	598	+0.17%
1846	582	−0.54%
1851	580	−0.07%
1856	585	+0.17%
1861	584	−0.03%
1866	582	−0.07%
1872	634	+1.44%
1876	671	+1.43%
1881	704	+0.96%
1886	747	+1.19%
1891	679	−1.89%
1896	764	+2.39%
1901	807	+1.10%

Year	Pop.	±% p.a.
1906	808	+0.02%
1911	786	−0.55%
1921	775	−0.14%
1926	798	+0.59%
1931	801	+0.08%
1936	811	+0.25%
1946	807	−0.05%
1954	930	+1.79%
1962	1,002	+0.94%
1968	1,130	+2.02%
1975	1,735	+6.32%
1982	2,695	+6.49%
1990	3,368	+2.83%
1999	3,592	+0.72%
2007	3,928	+1.12%
2012	4,327	+1.95%
2017	4,610	+1.28%
2023	5,290	+2.32%

Source: EHESS and INSEE (1968-2023)

== See also ==
- Communes of the Gironde department
