= Créon =

- Commune
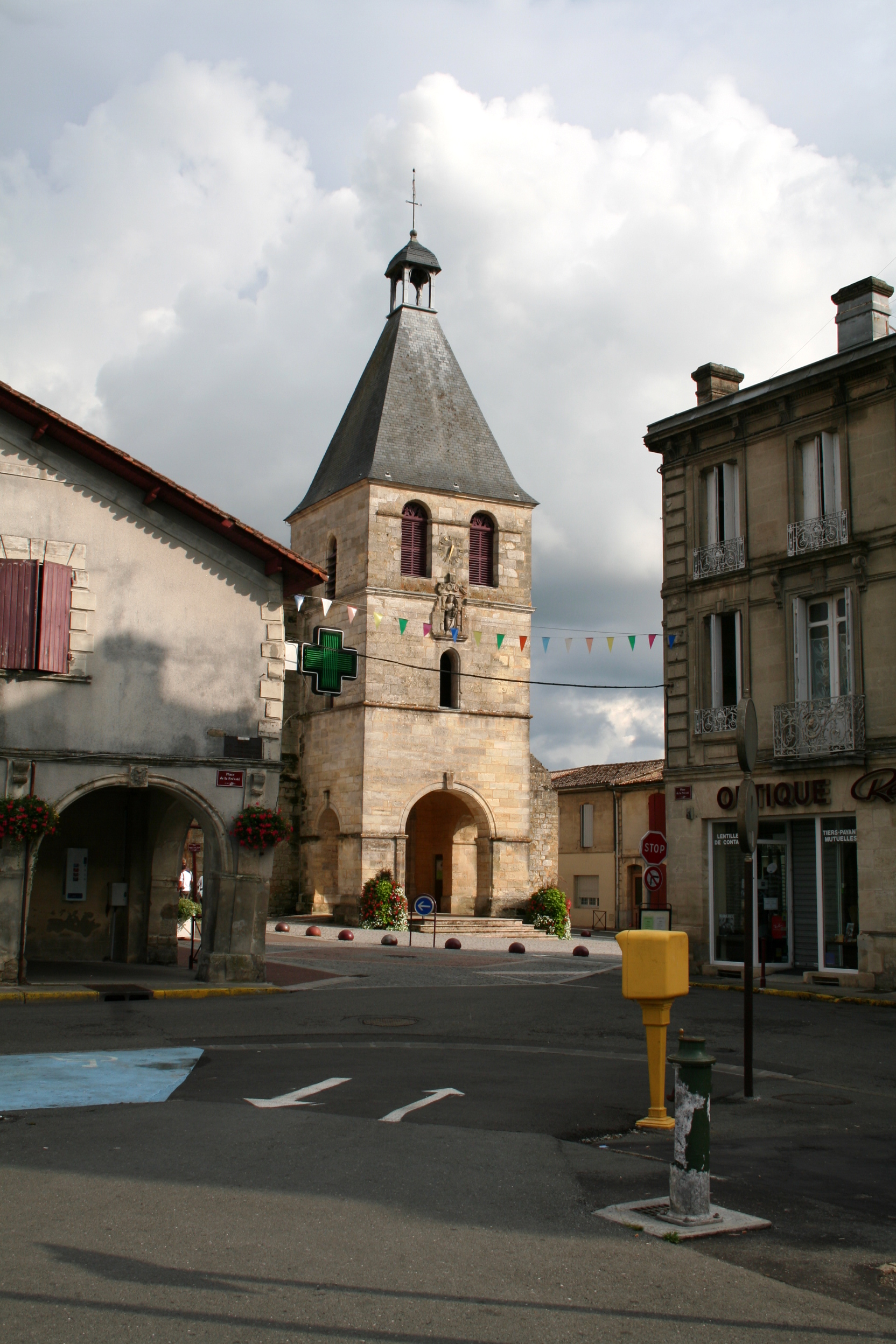
- The church in Créon

- Coat of arms
- Location of Créon
- Location within France Location within Nouvelle-Aquitaine
- Coordinates: 44°46′31″N 0°20′49″W
- Country: France
- Region: Nouvelle-Aquitaine
- Department: Gironde
- Arrondissement: Bordeaux
- Canton: Créon
- Intercommunality: Créonnais

Government
  - Mayor (2025–2026): Sylvie Desmond
- Area^{1}: 8.02 km^{2} (3.10 sq mi)
- Elevation: 100 m (330 ft)
- Highest elevation: 109 m (358 ft)
- Lowest elevation: 51 m (167 ft)
- Population (2023): 4,950
  - Density: 617/km^{2} (1,600/sq mi)
- Time zone: UTC+01:00 (CET)
  - Summer (DST): UTC+02:00 (CEST)
- INSEE/Postal code: 33140 /33670
- ^{1} French Land Register data, which excludes lakes, ponds, glaciers > 1 km^{2} (0.386 sq mi or 247 acres) and river estuaries.

Créon (French pronunciation: [kʁeɔ̃]; Gascon: Crion) is a commune in the Gironde department in Nouvelle-Aquitaine in southwestern France.

== Population ==
Historical population

Year	Pop.	±% p.a.
1793	877	—
1800	843	−0.56%
1806	910	+1.28%
1821	805	−0.81%
1831	913	+1.27%
1836	878	−0.78%
1841	896	+0.41%
1846	923	+0.60%
1851	1,004	+1.70%
1856	1,049	+0.88%
1861	1,069	+0.38%
1866	1,051	−0.34%
1872	1,085	+0.53%
1876	1,158	+1.64%
1881	1,142	−0.28%
1886	1,145	+0.05%
1891	1,131	−0.25%
1896	1,141	+0.18%
1901	1,116	−0.44%

Year	Pop.	±% p.a.
1906	1,043	−1.34%
1911	1,049	+0.11%
1921	978	−0.70%
1926	999	+0.43%
1931	1,012	+0.26%
1936	1,003	−0.18%
1946	1,015	+0.12%
1954	1,026	+0.13%
1962	1,286	+2.86%
1968	1,560	+3.27%
1975	1,842	+2.40%
1982	2,205	+2.60%
1990	2,508	+1.62%
1999	2,856	+1.45%
2007	3,922	+4.04%
2012	4,333	+2.01%
2017	4,697	+1.63%
2023	4,950	+0.88%

Source: EHESS and INSEE (1968-2023)

== Notable people ==
- Nicolas Thierry, politician

== See also ==
- Communes of the Gironde department
