= Croignon =

- Commune
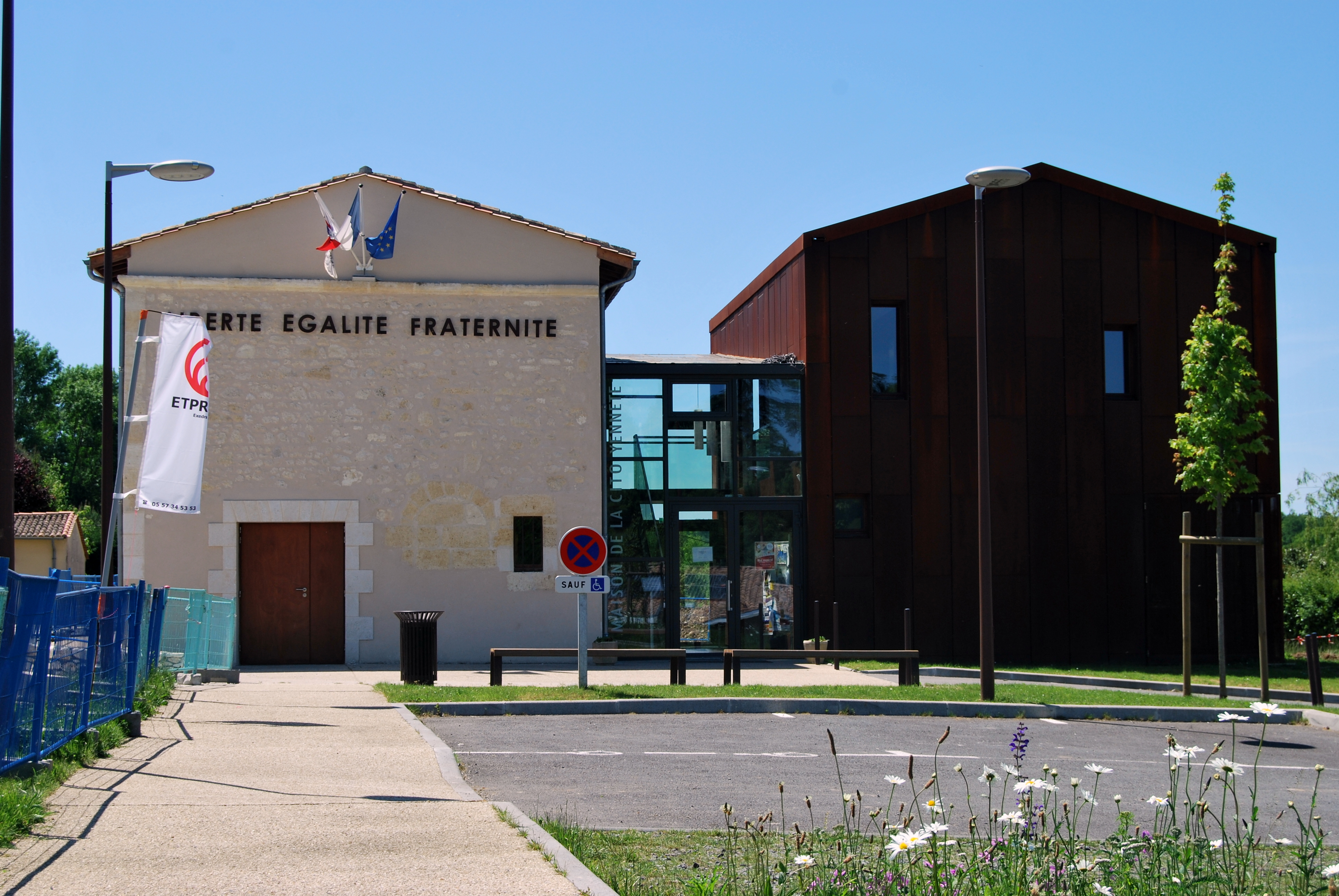
- The town hall in Croignon

- Coat of arms
- Location of Croignon
- Location within France Location within Nouvelle-Aquitaine
- Coordinates: 44°49′14″N 0°20′39″W
- Country: France
- Region: Nouvelle-Aquitaine
- Department: Gironde
- Arrondissement: Bordeaux
- Canton: Créon
- Intercommunality: Coteaux Bordelais

Government
  - Mayor (2020–2026): Jean-Frédéric Cousso
- Area^{1}: 4.62 km^{2} (1.78 sq mi)
- Elevation: 66 m (217 ft)
- Highest elevation: 103 m (338 ft)
- Lowest elevation: 26 m (85 ft)
- Population (2023): 749
  - Density: 162/km^{2} (420/sq mi)
- Time zone: UTC+01:00 (CET)
  - Summer (DST): UTC+02:00 (CEST)
- INSEE/Postal code: 33141 /33750
- ^{1} French Land Register data, which excludes lakes, ponds, glaciers > 1 km^{2} (0.386 sq mi or 247 acres) and river estuaries.

Croignon (French pronunciation: [kʁwaɲɔ̃]; Occitan: Cronhon) is a commune in the Gironde department in Nouvelle-Aquitaine in southwestern France.

== Population ==
Historical population
Year	Pop.	±% p.a.
1968	226	—
1975	235	+0.56%
1982	288	+2.95%
1990	349	+2.43%
1999	382	+1.01%
2007	465	+2.49%
2012	514	+2.02%
2017	642	+4.55%
2023	749	+2.60%
Source: INSEE

== See also ==
- Communes of the Gironde department
