= Baurech =

- Commune
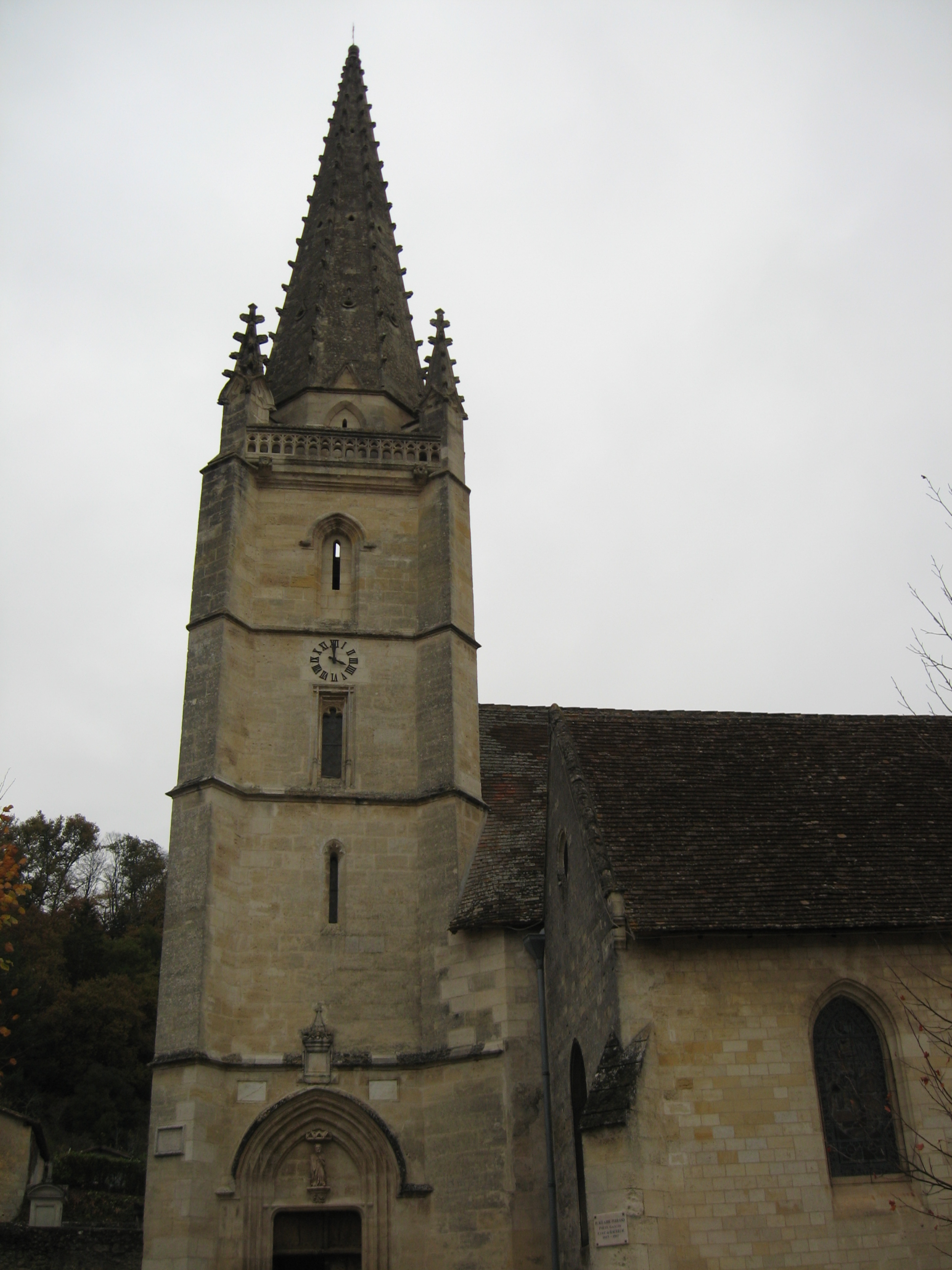
- The church in Baurech

- Coat of arms
- Location of Baurech
- Location within France Location within Nouvelle-Aquitaine
- Coordinates: 44°43′35″N 0°26′19″W
- Country: France
- Region: Nouvelle-Aquitaine
- Department: Gironde
- Arrondissement: Bordeaux
- Canton: Créon
- Intercommunality: Portes de l'Entre Deux Mers

Government
  - Mayor (2020–2026): Pascal Modet
- Area^{1}: 7.68 km^{2} (2.97 sq mi)
- Elevation: 56 m (184 ft)
- Highest elevation: 97 m (318 ft)
- Lowest elevation: 2 m (6.6 ft)
- Population (2023): 907
  - Density: 118/km^{2} (306/sq mi)
- Time zone: UTC+01:00 (CET)
  - Summer (DST): UTC+02:00 (CEST)
- INSEE/Postal code: 33033 /33880
- ^{1} French Land Register data, which excludes lakes, ponds, glaciers > 1 km^{2} (0.386 sq mi or 247 acres) and river estuaries.

Baurech (French pronunciation: [boʁɛʃ]) is a commune in the Gironde department in southwestern France.

== Population ==
Historical population
Year	Pop.	±% p.a.
1968	565	—
1975	598	+0.81%
1982	632	+0.79%
1990	633	+0.02%
1999	695	+1.04%
2007	763	+1.17%
2012	778	+0.39%
2017	871	+2.28%
2023	907	+0.68%
Source: INSEE

== See also ==
- Communes of the Gironde department
