= Le Pout =

- Commune
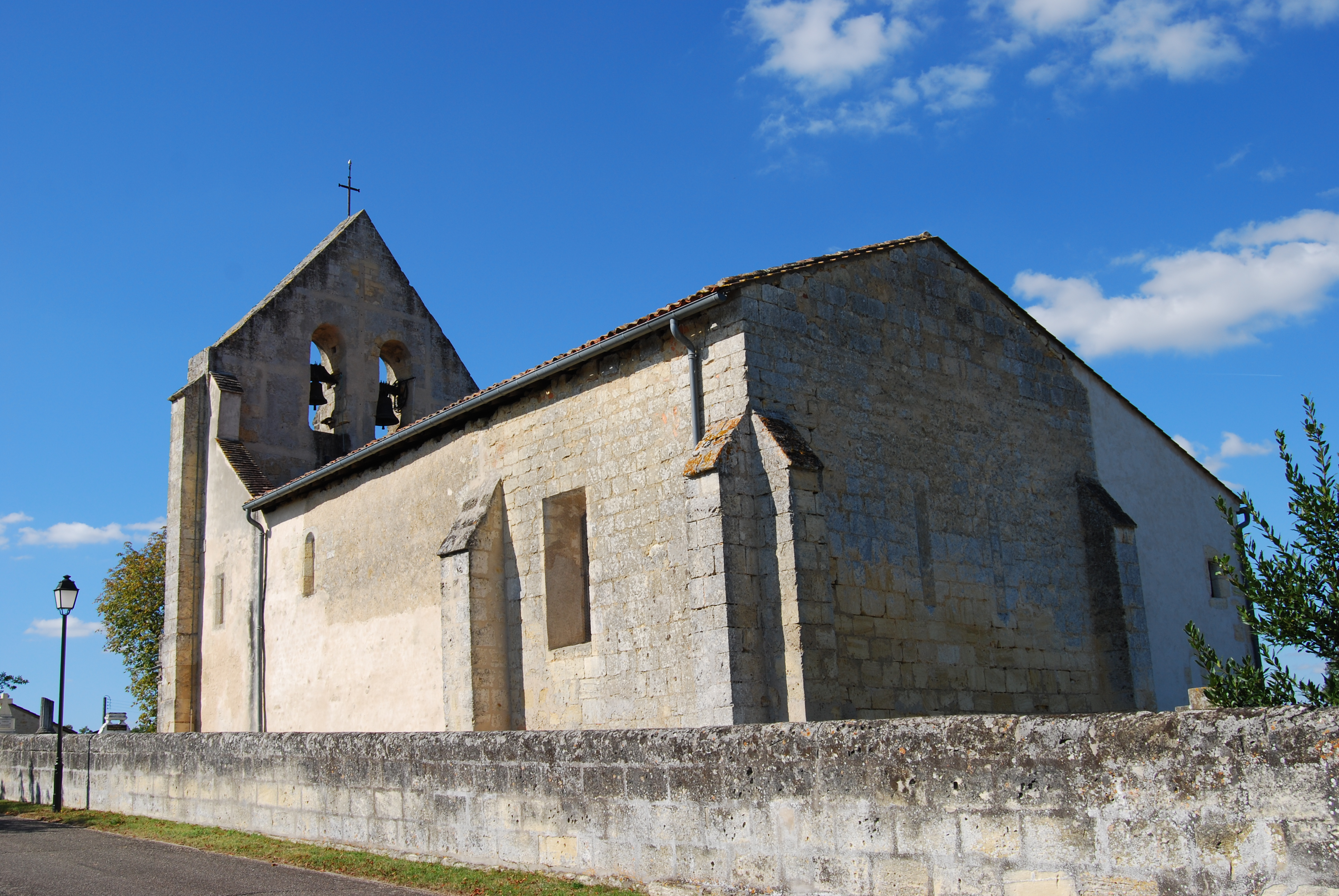
- The church in Le Pout

- Coat of arms
- Location of Le Pout
- Location within France Location within Nouvelle-Aquitaine
- Coordinates: 44°47′44″N 0°21′35″W
- Country: France
- Region: Nouvelle-Aquitaine
- Department: Gironde
- Arrondissement: Bordeaux
- Canton: Créon
- Intercommunality: Créonnais

Government
  - Mayor (2020–2026): Jean-Luc Joyeux
- Area^{1}: 3.93 km^{2} (1.52 sq mi)
- Highest elevation: 106 m (348 ft)
- Lowest elevation: 35 m (115 ft)
- Population (2023): 616
  - Density: 157/km^{2} (406/sq mi)
- Time zone: UTC+01:00 (CET)
  - Summer (DST): UTC+02:00 (CEST)
- INSEE/Postal code: 33335 /33670
- ^{1} French Land Register data, which excludes lakes, ponds, glaciers > 1 km^{2} (0.386 sq mi or 247 acres) and river estuaries.

Le Pout (French pronunciation: [lə pu]; Occitan: Lo Pot) is a commune in the Gironde department in Nouvelle-Aquitaine in southwestern France.

== Population ==
Historical population
Year	Pop.	±% p.a.
1968	128	—
1975	133	+0.55%
1982	302	+12.43%
1990	371	+2.61%
1999	340	−0.96%
2007	345	+0.18%
2012	546	+9.62%
2017	603	+2.01%
2023	616	+0.36%
Source: INSEE

== See also ==
- Communes of the Gironde department
