= Fargues-Saint-Hilaire =

- Commune
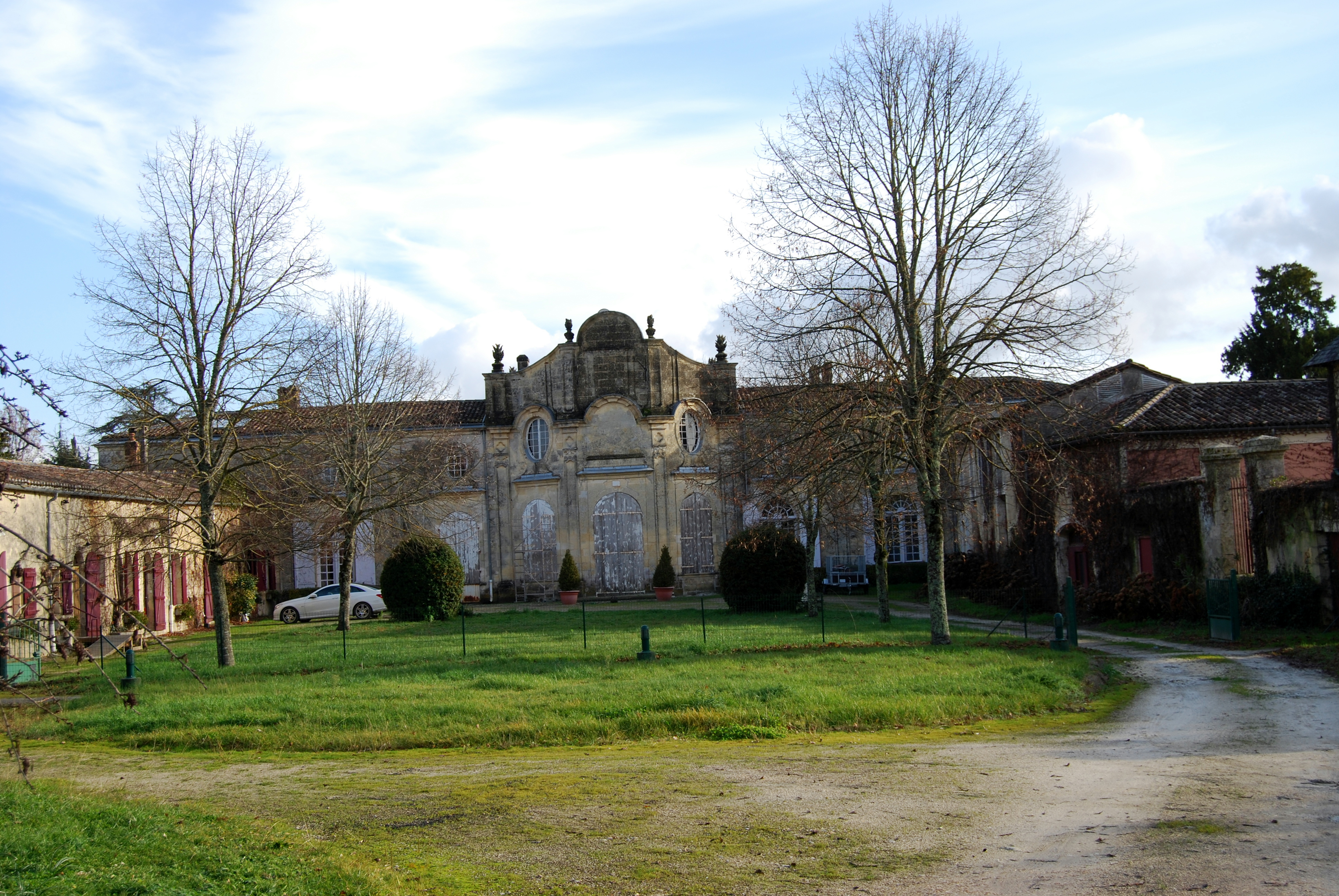
- Chateau of Beauséjour
- Location of Fargues-Saint-Hilaire
- Location within France Location within Nouvelle-Aquitaine
- Coordinates: 44°49′27″N 0°26′39″W
- Country: France
- Region: Nouvelle-Aquitaine
- Department: Gironde
- Arrondissement: Bordeaux
- Canton: Créon
- Intercommunality: Coteaux Bordelais

Government
  - Mayor (2020–2026): Bertrand Gautier
- Area^{1}: 7.42 km^{2} (2.86 sq mi)
- Highest elevation: 88 m (289 ft)
- Lowest elevation: 17 m (56 ft)
- Population (2023): 3,543
  - Density: 477/km^{2} (1,240/sq mi)
- Time zone: UTC+01:00 (CET)
  - Summer (DST): UTC+02:00 (CEST)
- INSEE/Postal code: 33165 /33370
- ^{1} French Land Register data, which excludes lakes, ponds, glaciers > 1 km^{2} (0.386 sq mi or 247 acres) and river estuaries.

Fargues-Saint-Hilaire (French pronunciation: [faʁɡ sɛ̃.t‿ilɛʁ]; Occitan: Fargas Sent Ilari) is a commune in the Gironde department in Nouvelle-Aquitaine in southwestern France.

== Population ==
Historical population
Year	Pop.	±% p.a.
1968	1,104	—
1975	1,212	+1.34%
1982	1,583	+3.89%
1990	2,032	+3.17%
1999	2,249	+1.13%
2007	2,745	+2.52%
2012	2,715	−0.22%
2017	2,889	+1.25%
2023	3,543	+3.46%
Source: INSEE

== See also ==
- Communes of the Gironde department
