= Saint-Caprais-de-Bordeaux =

- Commune
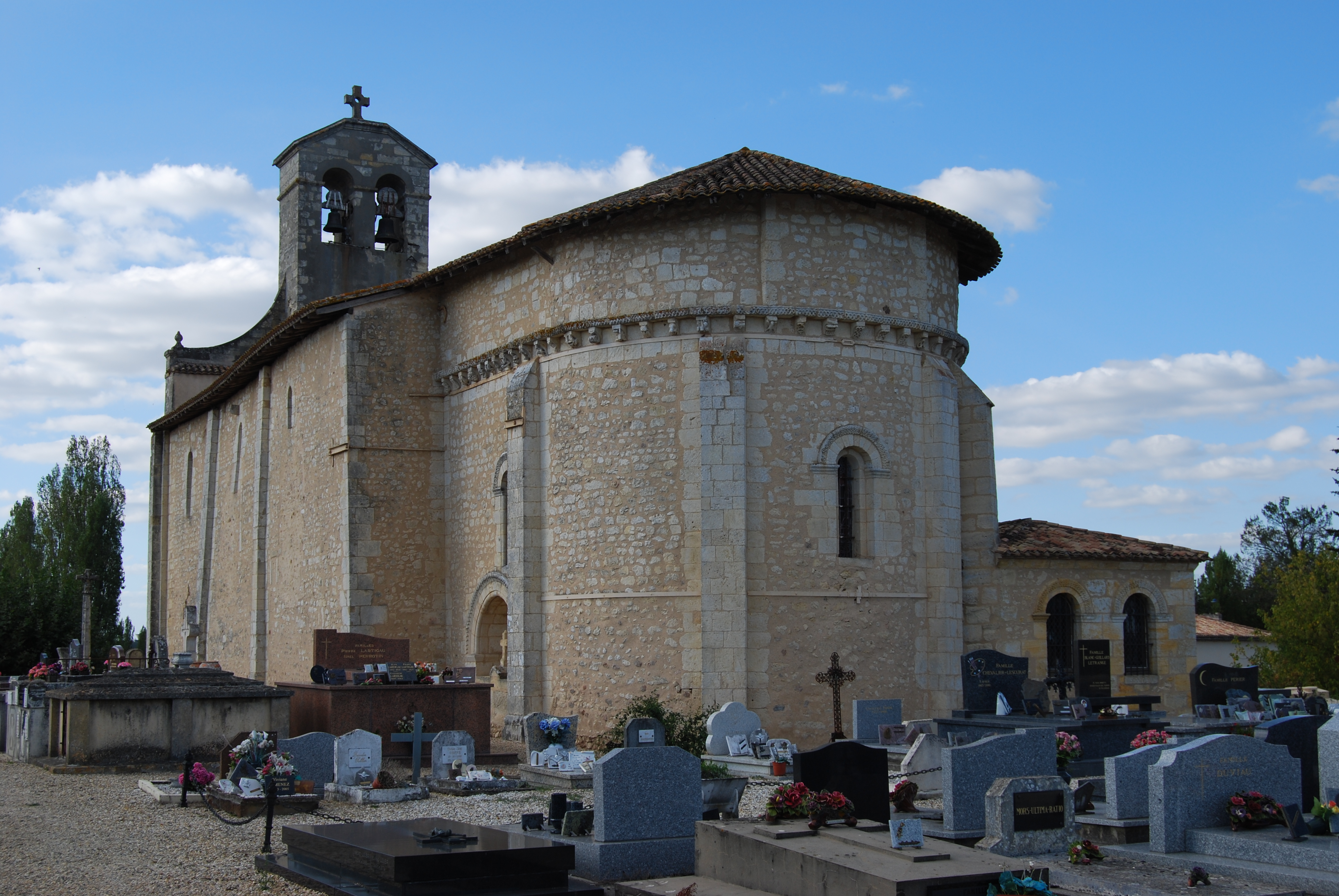
- The church in Saint-Caprais-de-Bordeaux

- Coat of arms
- Location of Saint-Caprais-de-Bordeaux
- Location within France Location within Nouvelle-Aquitaine
- Coordinates: 44°45′06″N 0°26′06″W
- Country: France
- Region: Nouvelle-Aquitaine
- Department: Gironde
- Arrondissement: Bordeaux
- Canton: Créon
- Intercommunality: Portes de l'Entre Deux Mers

Government
  - Mayor (2021–2026): Tania Couty
- Area^{1}: 10.26 km^{2} (3.96 sq mi)
- Elevation: 70 m (230 ft)
- Highest elevation: 97 m (318 ft)
- Lowest elevation: 25 m (82 ft)
- Population (2023): 3,450
  - Density: 336/km^{2} (871/sq mi)
- Time zone: UTC+01:00 (CET)
  - Summer (DST): UTC+02:00 (CEST)
- INSEE/Postal code: 33381 /33880
- ^{1} French Land Register data, which excludes lakes, ponds, glaciers > 1 km^{2} (0.386 sq mi or 247 acres) and river estuaries.

Saint-Caprais-de-Bordeaux (French pronunciation: [sɛ̃ kapʁɛ də bɔʁdo], literally Saint-Caprais of Bordeaux; Gascon: Sent Caprasi or Sent Caprasi de Bordèu) is a commune in the Gironde department in Nouvelle-Aquitaine in southwestern France.

== Population ==
Historical population
Year	Pop.	±% p.a.
1968	884	—
1975	1,006	+1.86%
1982	1,805	+8.71%
1990	2,321	+3.19%
1999	2,534	+0.98%
2007	2,659	+0.60%
2012	2,738	+0.59%
2017	3,222	+3.31%
2023	3,450	+1.15%
Source: INSEE

== See also ==
- Communes of the Gironde department
