= Château Beaugey =

French château

Coordinates: 44°48′07″N 0°28′48″W

Château Beaugey is a château in Gironde, Nouvelle-Aquitaine, France.
