= Haux, Gironde =

Haux
- Commune
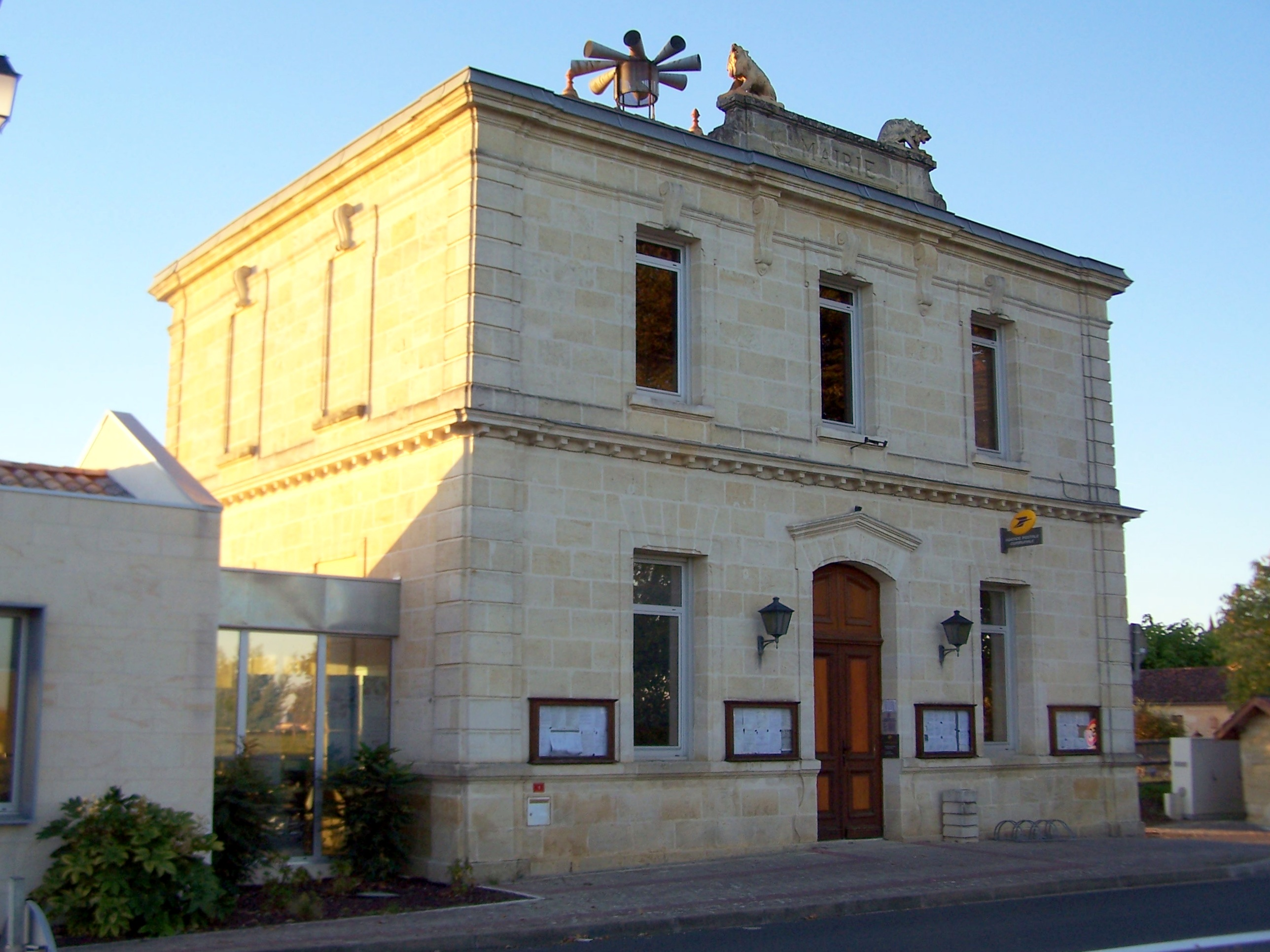
- The town hall in Haux

- Coat of arms
- Location of Haux
- Location within France Location within Nouvelle-Aquitaine
- Coordinates: 44°44′13″N 0°22′15″W
- Country: France
- Region: Nouvelle-Aquitaine
- Department: Gironde
- Arrondissement: Bordeaux
- Canton: L'Entre-Deux-Mers
- Intercommunality: Créonnais

Government
  - Mayor (2020–2026): Romain Barthet-Barateig
- Area^{1}: 10.21 km^{2} (3.94 sq mi)
- Elevation: 100 m (330 ft)
- Highest elevation: 101 m (331 ft)
- Lowest elevation: 11 m (36 ft)
- Population (2023): 840
  - Density: 82/km^{2} (210/sq mi)
- Time zone: UTC+01:00 (CET)
  - Summer (DST): UTC+02:00 (CEST)
- INSEE/Postal code: 33201 /33550
- ^{1} French Land Register data, which excludes lakes, ponds, glaciers > 1 km^{2} (0.386 sq mi or 247 acres) and river estuaries.

Haux (French pronunciation: [ɔks]; Gascon: Haus) is a commune situated in the Gironde department in southwestern France.

== Population ==
Historical population
Year	Pop.	±% p.a.
1968	552	—
1975	504	−1.29%
1982	647	+3.63%
1990	729	+1.50%
1999	732	+0.05%
2007	759	+0.45%
2012	781	+0.57%
2017	827	+1.15%
2023	840	+0.26%
Source: INSEE

== See also ==
- Communes of the Gironde department
