= Loupes =

- Commune
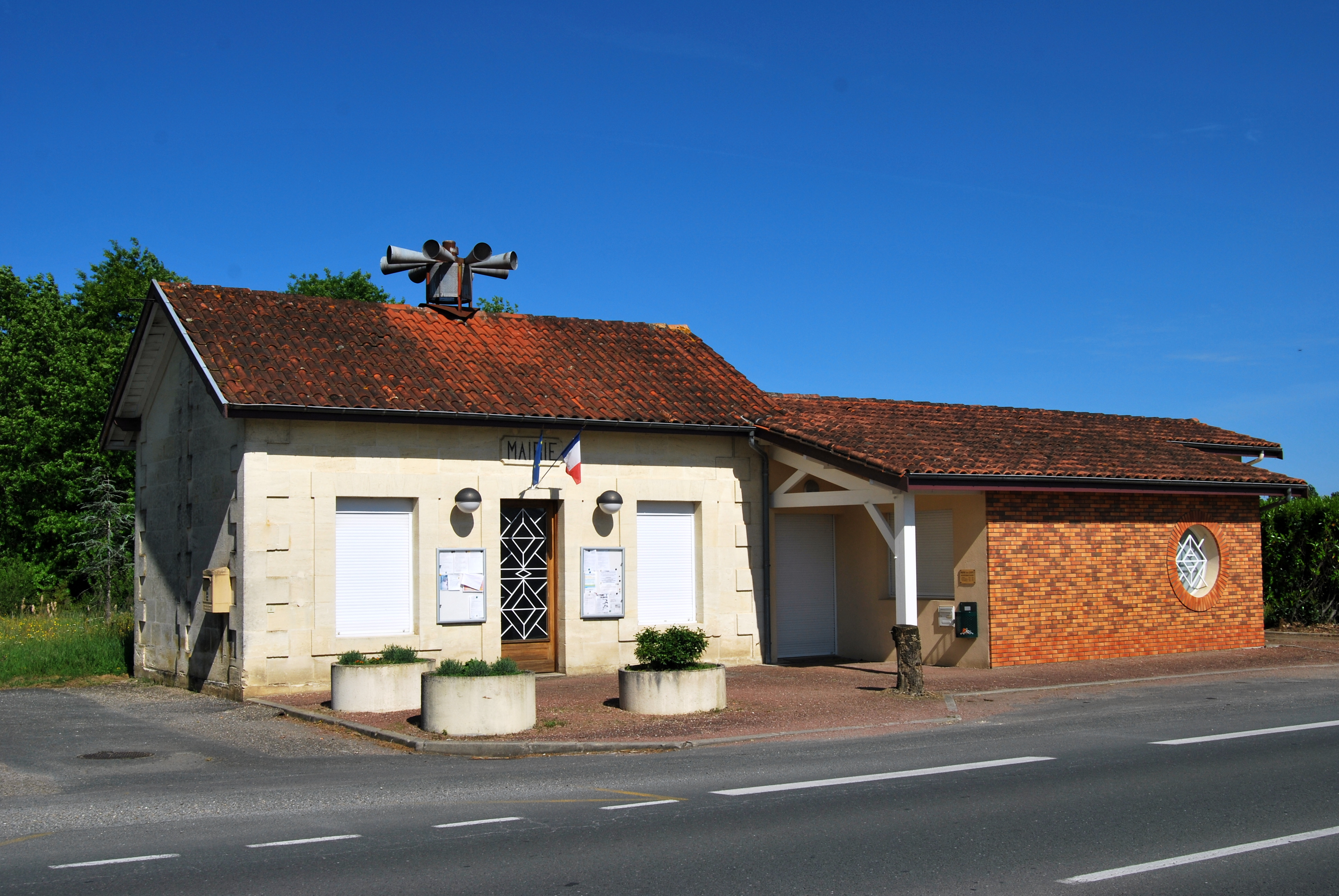
- The town hall in Loupes

- Coat of arms
- Location of Loupes
- Location within France Location within Nouvelle-Aquitaine
- Coordinates: 44°48′23″N 0°23′32″W
- Country: France
- Region: Nouvelle-Aquitaine
- Department: Gironde
- Arrondissement: Bordeaux
- Canton: Créon
- Intercommunality: Créonnais

Government
  - Mayor (2020–2026): Véronique Lesvignes
- Area^{1}: 4.87 km^{2} (1.88 sq mi)
- Elevation: 103 m (338 ft)
- Highest elevation: 105 m (344 ft)
- Lowest elevation: 45 m (148 ft)
- Population (2023): 957
  - Density: 197/km^{2} (509/sq mi)
- Time zone: UTC+01:00 (CET)
  - Summer (DST): UTC+02:00 (CEST)
- INSEE/Postal code: 33252 /33370
- ^{1} French Land Register data, which excludes lakes, ponds, glaciers > 1 km^{2} (0.386 sq mi or 247 acres) and river estuaries.

Loupes (French pronunciation: [lup]; Occitan: Lopa) is a commune in the Gironde department in Nouvelle-Aquitaine in southwestern France.

== Name ==
The name of the town is thought to come from the Latin noun lupus, which means "wolf".

== Population ==
Historical population
Year	Pop.	±% p.a.
1968	171	—
1975	239	+4.90%
1982	291	+2.85%
1990	348	+2.26%
1999	442	+2.69%
2007	595	+3.79%
2012	687	+2.92%
2017	795	+2.96%
2023	957	+3.14%
Source: INSEE

== See also ==
- Communes of the Gironde department
