= Camarsac =

- Commune
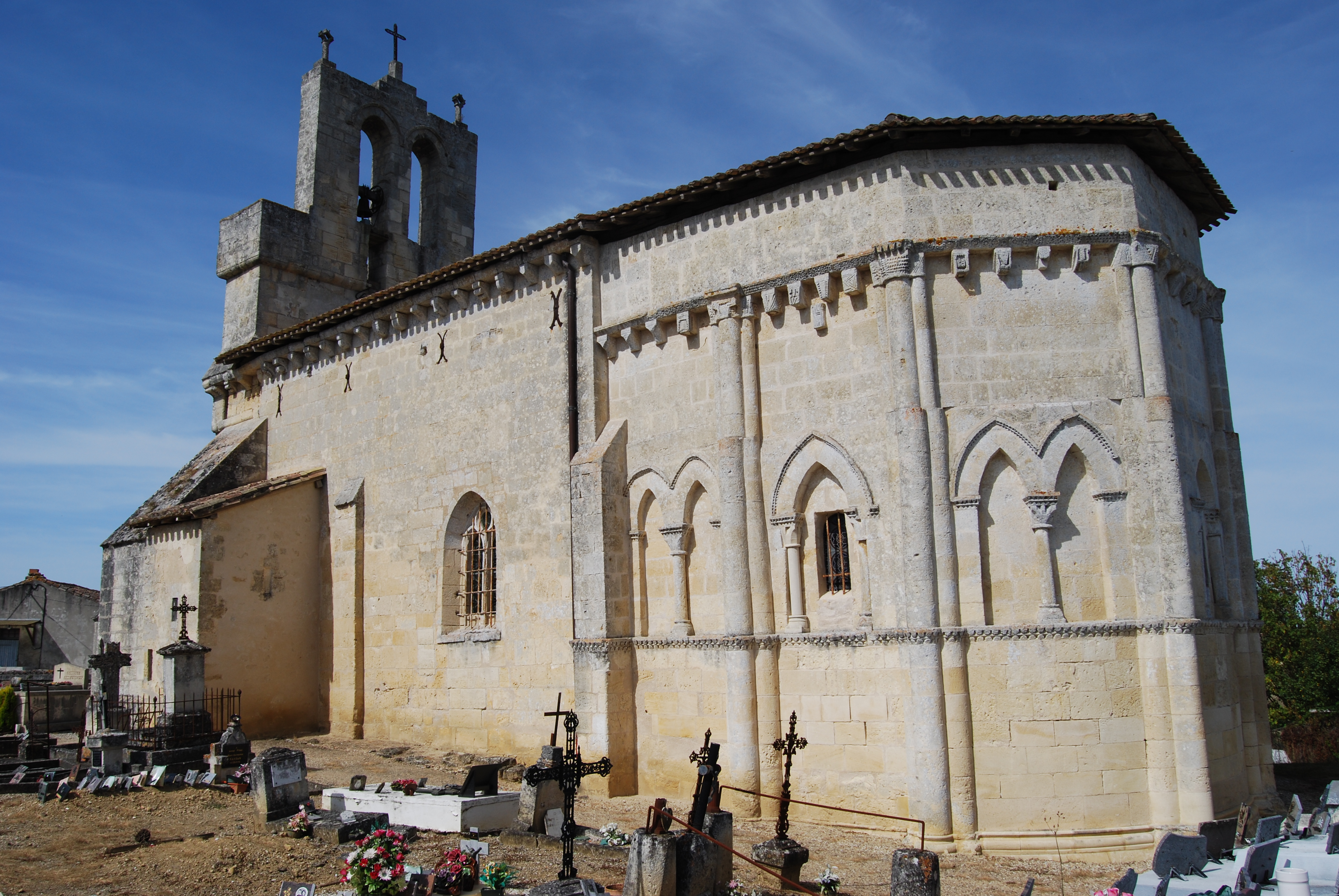
- The church in Camarsac

- Coat of arms
- Location of Camarsac
- Location within France Location within Nouvelle-Aquitaine
- Coordinates: 44°50′00″N 0°21′48″W
- Country: France
- Region: Nouvelle-Aquitaine
- Department: Gironde
- Arrondissement: Bordeaux
- Canton: Créon
- Intercommunality: Coteaux Bordelais

Government
  - Mayor (2020–2026): Marie-Jeanne Sokolovitch
- Area^{1}: 5.35 km^{2} (2.07 sq mi)
- Elevation: 44 m (144 ft)
- Highest elevation: 99 m (325 ft)
- Lowest elevation: 24 m (79 ft)
- Population (2023): 1,048
  - Density: 196/km^{2} (507/sq mi)
- Time zone: UTC+01:00 (CET)
  - Summer (DST): UTC+02:00 (CEST)
- INSEE/Postal code: 33083 /33750
- ^{1} French Land Register data, which excludes lakes, ponds, glaciers > 1 km^{2} (0.386 sq mi or 247 acres) and river estuaries.

Camarsac (French pronunciation: [kamaʁsak]) is a commune in the Gironde department in Nouvelle-Aquitaine in southwestern France.

== Population ==
Historical population
Year	Pop.	±% p.a.
1968	420	—
1975	543	+3.74%
1982	766	+5.04%
1990	743	−0.38%
1999	771	+0.41%
2007	913	+2.14%
2012	960	+1.01%
2017	1,004	+0.90%
2023	1,048	+0.72%
Source: INSEE

== See also ==
- Communes of the Gironde department
