= Caprasius =

Caprasius may refer to:

- Caprasius of Agen (4th century), French martyr and saint
- Caprasius of Lérins (died 430), French hermit and saint
- San Caprasio, a church in Santa Cruz de la Serós, Jacetania, Spain, dedicated to Caprasius of Agen
