= Canton of Créon =

Coordinates: 44.77°N 0.35°W

Créon
- Canton
- A map of the canton of Créon in the Gironde department.
- Country: France
- Region: Nouvelle-Aquitaine
- Department: Gironde
- No. of communes: {{{nbcomm}}}
- INSEE code: 3311

The canton of Créon is an administrative division of the Gironde department, southwestern France. Its borders were modified at the French canton reorganisation which came into effect in March 2015. Its seat is in Créon.

It consists of the following communes:

1. Baurech
2. Bonnetan
3. Camarsac
4. Cambes
5. Camblanes-et-Meynac
6. Carignan-de-Bordeaux
7. Cénac
8. Créon
9. Croignon
10. Cursan
11. Fargues-Saint-Hilaire
12. Latresne
13. Lignan-de-Bordeaux
14. Loupes
15. Madirac
16. Pompignac
17. Le Pout
18. Quinsac
19. Sadirac
20. Saint-Caprais-de-Bordeaux
21. Saint-Genès-de-Lombaud
22. Sallebœuf
23. Tresses
