= Cambes, Gironde =

Cambes
- Commune
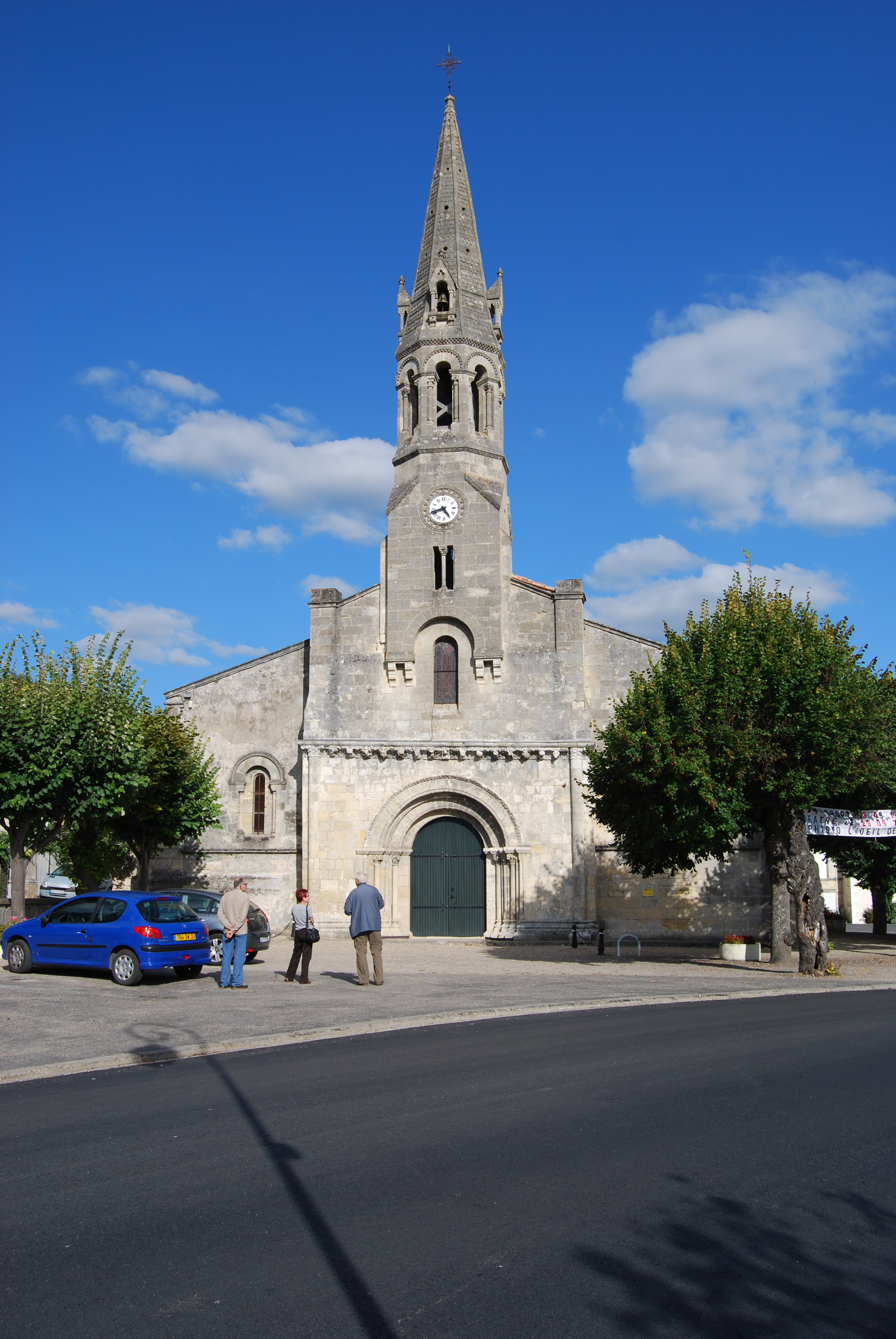
- The church in Cambes

- Coat of arms
- Location of Cambes
- Location within France Location within Nouvelle-Aquitaine
- Coordinates: 44°43′58″N 0°27′43″W
- Country: France
- Region: Nouvelle-Aquitaine
- Department: Gironde
- Arrondissement: Bordeaux
- Canton: Créon
- Intercommunality: Portes de l'Entre Deux Mers

Government
  - Mayor (2022–2026): Rose Pedreira Afonso
- Area^{1}: 5.34 km^{2} (2.06 sq mi)
- Elevation: 23 m (75 ft)
- Highest elevation: 86 m (282 ft)
- Lowest elevation: 2 m (6.6 ft)
- Population (2023): 1,897
  - Density: 355/km^{2} (920/sq mi)
- Time zone: UTC+01:00 (CET)
  - Summer (DST): UTC+02:00 (CEST)
- INSEE/Postal code: 33084 /33880
- ^{1} French Land Register data, which excludes lakes, ponds, glaciers > 1 km^{2} (0.386 sq mi or 247 acres) and river estuaries.

Cambes (French pronunciation: [kɑ̃b]; Occitan: Cambas) is a commune in the Gironde department in Nouvelle-Aquitaine in southwestern France.

== Population ==
Historical population
Year	Pop.	±% p.a.
1968	838	—
1975	844	+0.10%
1982	924	+1.30%
1990	1,035	+1.43%
1999	1,145	+1.13%
2007	1,275	+1.35%
2012	1,345	+1.07%
2017	1,625	+3.85%
2023	1,897	+2.61%
Source: INSEE

== See also ==
- Communes of the Gironde department
