= List of senators of Gironde =

Location of Gironde in France

Following is a list of senators of Gironde, people who have represented the department of Gironde in the Senate of France.

== Third Republic ==
Senators for Gironde under the French Third Republic were:

- Charles de Pelleport-Burete (1876-1879)
- Louis Béhic (1876–1879)
- Louis Hubert-Delisle (1876–1879)
- Raoul Duval (1876–1879)
- Pierre Issartier (1879–1887)
- Jean Callen (1879–1888)
- Henri de Lur-Saluces (1879–1891)
- Bernard Dupouy de 1879–1897)
- Armand Caduc (1885–1902)
- André Lavertujon (1887–1897)
- Ludovic Trarieux (1888–1904)
- Louis Obissier (1897–1911)
- David Raynal (1897-1903) died in office
- Albert Thounens (1903-1920)
- Ernest Monis (1891–1920)
- Albert Decrais (1903–1915)
- Marcel Courrégelongue (1904–1924)
- Guillaume Chastenet de Castaing (1912–1933)
- Eugène Buhan (1920–1933)
- Louis David (1920–1924)
- Marcel Vayssiere (1920-1922) died in office
- Charles Chaumet (1923–1932)
- Fernand Faure (1924–1929)
- Armand Calmel (1924–1941)
- Joseph Capus (1930–1941)
- René Caillier (1932–1941)
- Jean Odin (1933-1941)
- Georges Portmann (1933-1941)

== Fourth Republic ==
Senators for Gironde under the French Fourth Republic were:

- René Duhourquet (1946–1948)
- François Leuret (1946–1948)
- Maxime Teyssandier (1946–1948)
- Robert Brettes (1946–1959)
- Jean Sourbet (7–19 November 1948)
- Lucien de Gracia (1948–1951)
- Jean Durand (1948–1955)
- Max Monichon (1948–1959)
- Georges Milh (1951–1955)
- Marc Pauzet (1955–1959)
- Georges Portmann (1955–1959)

== Fifth Republic ==
Former senators for Gironde under the French Fifth Republic were:

| Name | Took office | Group | Notes |
|---|---|---|---|
| Marc Pauzet | 1959–1971 | | |
| Georges Portmann | 1959–1971 | | |
| Max Monichon | 1959–1977 | | |
| Raymond Brun | 1959–1989 | | |
| Jacques Boyer-Andrivet | 1971–1980 then 1987–1989 | | |
| Jean-François Pintat | 1971–1990 | | |
| Armand Bastit-Saint Martin | 1977–1980 | | |
| Marc Boeuf | 1980–1993 | | |
| Jacques Valade | 1980–1987, then 1989–2008 | The Republicans group (Senate) (UMP) | |
| Bernard Dussaut | 1989–2008 | Socialist and Republican group (SOC) | |
| Gérard César | 1990–2017 | The Republicans group (Senate) (UMP) | resigned 2017 |
| Joëlle Dusseau | 1993–1998 | | |
| Xavier Pintat | 1998–2017 | The Republicans group (Senate) (UMP) | resigned 2017 |
| Alain Anziani | 2008–2017 | Socialist and Republican group (SOC) | resigned 2017 |
| Marie-Hélène des Esgaulx | 2008–2017 | The Republicans group (Senate) (UMP) | resigned 2017 |

As of January 2018 the senators were:

| Name | Took office | Group | Notes |
|---|---|---|---|
| Françoise Cartron | 2008 / 2014 | Socialist and Republican group (SOC) | |
| Philippe Madrelle | 1980 / 1989 / 1998 / 2008 / 2014 | Socialist and Republican group (SOC) | |
| Alain Cazabonne | from 1 October 2017 | Centrist Union group (UC) | replaced Marie-Hélène Des Esgaulx, resigned |
| Nathalie Delattre | from 1 October 2017 | European Democratic and Social Rally group (RDSE) | replaced Xavier Pintat, resigned |
| Laurence Harribey | from 1 October 2017 | Socialist and Republican group (SOC) | replaced Alain Anziani, resigned |
| Florence Lassarde | from 1 October 2017 | The Republicans group (Senate) (UMP) | replaced Gérard César, resigned |

== Sources ==
- Liste des anciens sénateurs de la IIIème République par circonscription (in French), Sénat de France
- Liste des anciens sénateurs de la IVème République par circonscription (in French), Sénat de France
- Liste des anciens sénateurs de la Vème République par circonscription (in French), Sénat de France
- Liste par département - Gironde (in French), Sénat de France
