= List of presidents of Aquitaine =

This is the list of presidents of Aquitaine since 1974. Regional legislatures are directly elected since 1986.

№	President	Party	Term	Other positions
1	Jacques Chaban-Delmas	UDR, after RPR	1974 – 1979	President of National Assembly; Deputy of Gironde; Mayor of Bordeaux
2	André Labarrère	PS	1979 – 1981	Deputy of Pyrénées-Atlantiques; Mayor of Pau; Delegated Minister in charge of relations with Parliament (1981-1986)
3	Philippe Madrelle	PS	1981 – 1985	Senator de la Gironde; Mayor of Carbon-Blanc
4	Jacques Chaban-Delmas	RPR	1985 – 1988	President of National Assembly; Deputy of Gironde; Mayor of Bordeaux
-	Jean François-Poncet	UDF	1988	Acting president President of departmental council of Lot-et-Garonne
5	Jean Tavernier	RPR	1988 – 1992	
6	Jacques Valade	RPR	1992 – 1998	Senator de la Gironde
7	Alain Rousset	PS	1998 – 2015	Mayor of Pessac; Deputy of Gironde's 7th constituency
