= Noël Mamère =

French journalist and politician (born 1948)

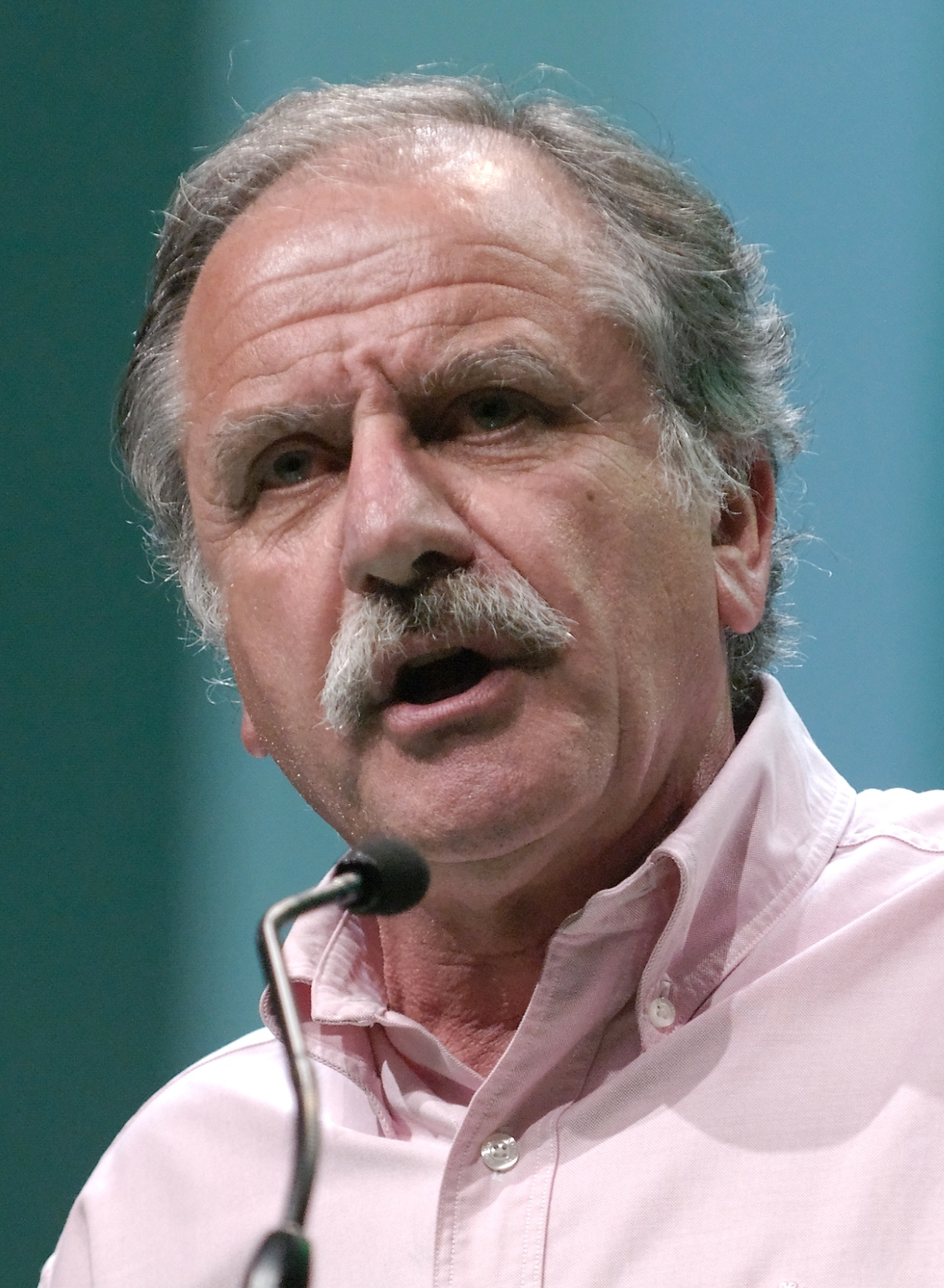
- Noël Mamère in 2009

Member of the French National Assembly for Gironde's 3rd constituency
- In office 1 June 1997 – 20 June 2017
- Preceded by: Jean-Claude Barran
- Succeeded by: Loïc Prud'homme

Mayor of Bègles
- In office 20 March 1989 – 29 June 2017
- Preceded by: Bernard Moncla
- Succeeded by: Clément Rossignol Puech

Member of the European Parliament for France
- In office 19 July 1994 – 11 August 1997
- Succeeded by: Henri de Lassus Saint-Geniès
- Parliamentary group: ERA (1994‍–‍1996); Green (1996‍–‍1997)

Member of the Aquitaine Regional Council for Gironde
- In office 23 March 1992 – 25 October 1994

Personal details
- Born: 25 December 1948 (age 77) Libourne, Gironde, France
- Party: GE (1990–1994); CES (1994–1998); LV (1998–2010); EELV (2010–2013); Génération.s (2017–2018)
- Profession: Journalist

Noël Mamère (French pronunciation: [nɔɛl mamɛʁ]; born 25 December 1948) is a French journalist and former politician. He was the mayor of Bègles in Gironde from 1989 to 2017, as well as deputy to the French National Assembly for Gironde's 3rd constituency from 1997 to 2017. He also served as a Member of the European Parliament from 1994 to 1997.

== Biography ==
Noël Mamère rose to fame in the 1980s as a journalist and anchorman, in particular on Antenne 2.

In 1992, he became president of Brice Lalonde's Ecology Generation party, from which he was expelled in 1994. He then founded "Ecology-Solidarity Convergences", of which he was president, before joining Les Verts in 1998.

In 2002, he was a presidential candidate and garnered 5.25% of the votes.

On 5 June 2004, whilst mayor of Bègles, he stirred up controversy by conducting a marriage ceremony for a male homosexual couple, nine years before same-sex marriage became legal in France. The marriage was annulled by the courts on 27 July 2004. The couple appealed to the European Court of Human Rights, who ultimately upheld the annulment in 2016, but acknowledged that, by then, it was now legal for them to get married.

== Political career ==
Member of European Parliament : 1994–1997 (Resignation, elected in the National Assembly of France). Elected in 1994.

Member of the National Assembly of France for Gironde : 1997–2017. Elected in 1997, reelected in 2002, 2007, 2012.

Regional councillor of Aquitaine : 1992–1994 (Resignation) / March 1998 (Resignation). Reelected in 1998.

Mayor of Bègles : 1989–2017. Reelected in 1995, 2001, 2008, 2014.

Municipal councillor of Bègles : 1989–2017. Reelected in 1995, 2001, 2008, 2014.

Vice-president of the Urban Community of Bordeaux : 1989–2001. Reelected in 1995.

Member of the Urban Community of Bordeaux : 1989–2001. Reelected in 1995.
