= Politics of Aquitaine =

The politics of Aquitaine, France takes place in a framework of a presidential representative democracy, whereby the President of Regional Council is the head of government, and of a pluriform multi-party system. Legislative power is vested in the regional council.

== Executive ==
The executive of the region is led by the President of the regional council.

=== Current composition ===
- Alain Rousset (PS): President
- Jean-Louis Carrère (PS): 1st Vice President
- Françoise Cartron (PS): 2nd Vice President
- Georges Labazée (PS): 3rd Vice President
- Jean-Pierre Dufour (Green): 4th Vice President
- Michel Moyrand (PS): 5th Vice President
- Jean Guérard (PS): 6th Vice President
- Alain Anziani (PS): 7th Vice President
- François Deluga (PS): 8th Vice President
- Anne-Marie Cocula (DVG): 9th Vice President
- Rose-Marie Schmitt (Green): 10th Vice President
- Henri Houdebert (PS): 11th Vice President
- François Maïtia (PS): 12th Vice President
- Béatrice Gendreau (PS): 13th Vice President
- Jean Lissar (Green): 14th Vice President
- Stéphane Delpeyrat (PS): 15th Vice President

=== List of presidents ===
Presidents of Aquitaine
President	Party	Term
Jacques Chaban-Delmas	UDR	1974-1979
André Labarrère	PS	1979-1981
Philippe Madrelle	PS	1981-1985
Jacques Chaban-Delmas	RPR	1985-1988
Jean Tavernier	RPR	1988-1992
Jacques Valade	RPR	1992-1998
Alain Rousset	PS	1998-

== Legislative branch ==
The Regional Council of Aquitaine (Conseil régional d'Aquitaine) is composed of 85 councillors, elected by proportional representation in a two-round system. The winning list in the second round is automatically entitled to a quarter of the seats. The remainder of the seats are allocated through proportional representation with a 5% threshold.

The council is elected for a six-year term.

=== Current composition ===
Party		seats
•	Socialist Party	43
	Union for a Popular Movement	12
	Union for French Democracy	9
•	The Greens	9
	National Front	7
•	Miscellaneous Left	4
•	Left Radical Party	1

== Elections ==
=== Other elections ===
In the 2007 legislative election, the PS won 16 seats, the UMP won 7, and the MoDem won two. In addition, the New Centre won one seat, as did the Greens.
