= Cantons of the Gironde department =

The following is a list of the 33 cantons of the Gironde department, in France, following the French canton reorganisation which came into effect in March 2015:

- Andernos-les-Bains
- Bordeaux-1
- Bordeaux-2
- Bordeaux-3
- Bordeaux-4
- Bordeaux-5
- Le Bouscat
- La Brède
- Cenon
- Les Coteaux de Dordogne
- Créon
- L'Entre-Deux-Mers
- L'Estuaire
- Gujan-Mestras
- Les Landes des Graves
- Le Libournais-Fronsadais
- Lormont
- Mérignac-1
- Mérignac-2
- Le Nord-Gironde
- Le Nord-Libournais
- Le Nord-Médoc
- Pessac-1
- Pessac-2
- Les Portes du Médoc
- La Presqu'île
- Le Réolais et Les Bastides
- Saint-Médard-en-Jalles
- Le Sud-Gironde
- Le Sud-Médoc
- Talence
- La Teste-de-Buch
- Villenave-d'Ornon
