= Grégoire de Fournas =

French politician (born 1985)

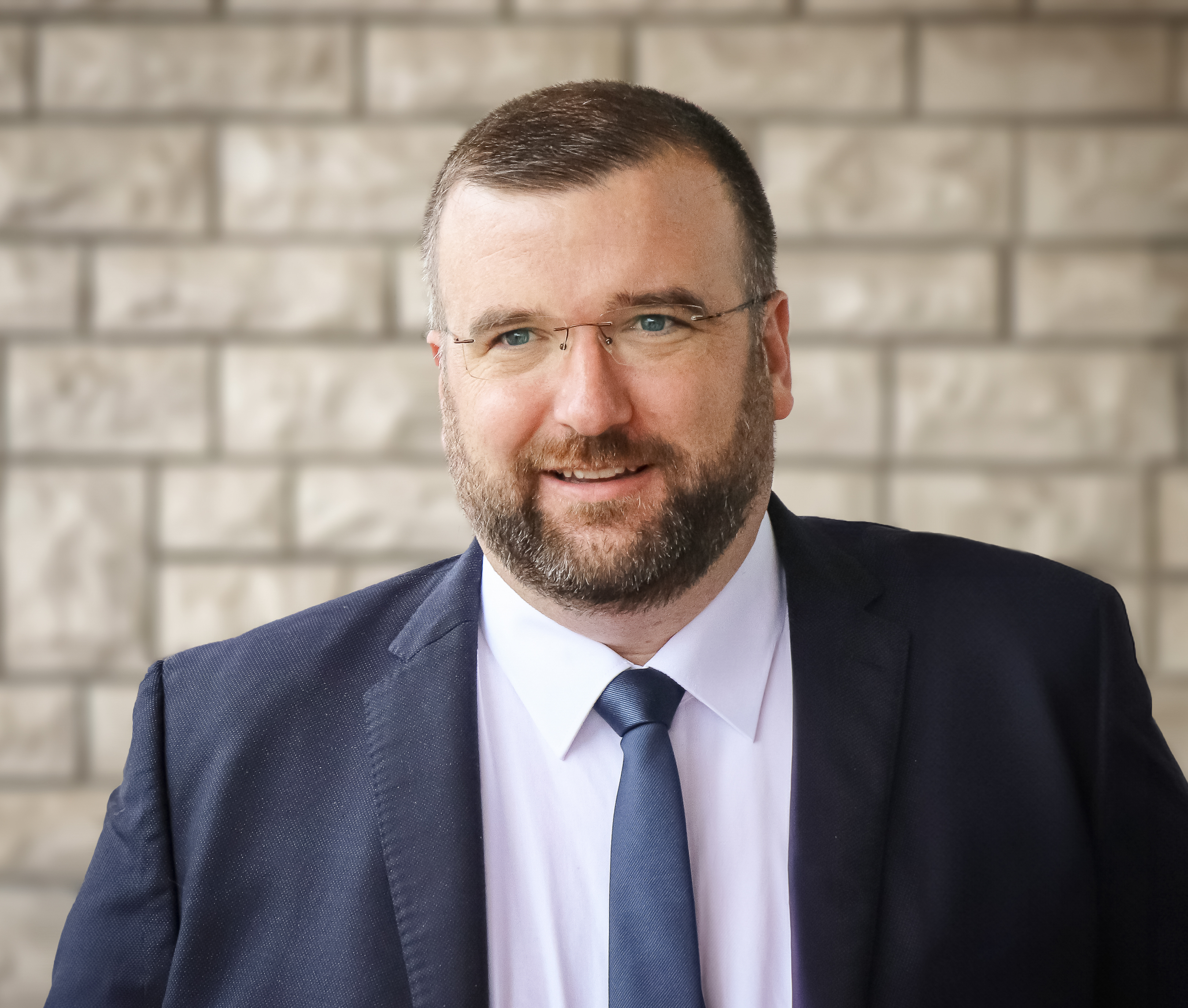

Member of the National Assembly for Gironde's 5th constituency
- In office 22 June 2022 – 9 June 2024
- Preceded by: Benoît Simian
- Succeeded by: Pascale Got

Personal details
- Born: Grégoire de Fournas de Brosse; 19 March 1985 (age 41) Lesparre-Médoc, France
- Party: National Rally (2011–present)
- Occupation: Winegrower, politician

Grégoire de Fournas de Brosse (French pronunciation: [ɡʁeɡwaʁ də fuʁnas]; born 19 March 1985) is a French politician who represented the National Assembly Party in the National Assembly from 2022 to 2024. A member of the National Rally (RN), he has been a municipal councillor of Pauillac since 2020. De Fournas also held a seat in the Departmental Council of Gironde for the canton of Le Nord-Médoc from 2015 to 2021.

In the 2024 legislative elections, he lost his seat in the National Assembly after being defeated in the second round in his constituency.

== Biography ==
Grégoire de Fournas holds Brevet de technicien supérieur qualifications in agricultural studies, viticulture and oenology. His family runs the Château Vieux Cassan vineyard in Saint-Germain-d'Esteuil of which he became the director in 2010.

He was elected a departmental councillor of Gironde in the canton of Le Nord-Médoc in 2015. He campaigned against the construction of a nearby windfarm. In 2020, he was elected a municipal councillor of Pauillac.

In the 2022 legislative election, he was elected in the 5th constituency of Gironde unseating La République En Marche! (LREM) representative Benoît Simian. A profile in Libération described De Fournas as a "staunch defender of hunting, fiercely opposed to wind turbines, the installations of which he virulently combats."

=== 2022 ban from parliament ===
On 3 November 2022, during the government question period in the National Assembly, De Fournas interrupted fellow representative Carlos Martens Bilongo's remarks on the situation of migrants on the SOS Méditerranée ship Ocean Viking, shouting "Qu'il retourne en Afrique!" which can be translated either to "He just has to go back to Africa then!" or "It just has to go back to Africa then!"

De Fournas's outburst was deemed racist by other MPs, though it was unclear whether he was referring to Bilongo or the ship. De Fournas rejected the racism accusation, saying he was referring to the ship. National Assembly President Yaël Braun-Pivet suspended the meeting following the remarks. De Fournas later received a 15-day ban from the National Assembly and had his pay docked.
