= Émile Moure =

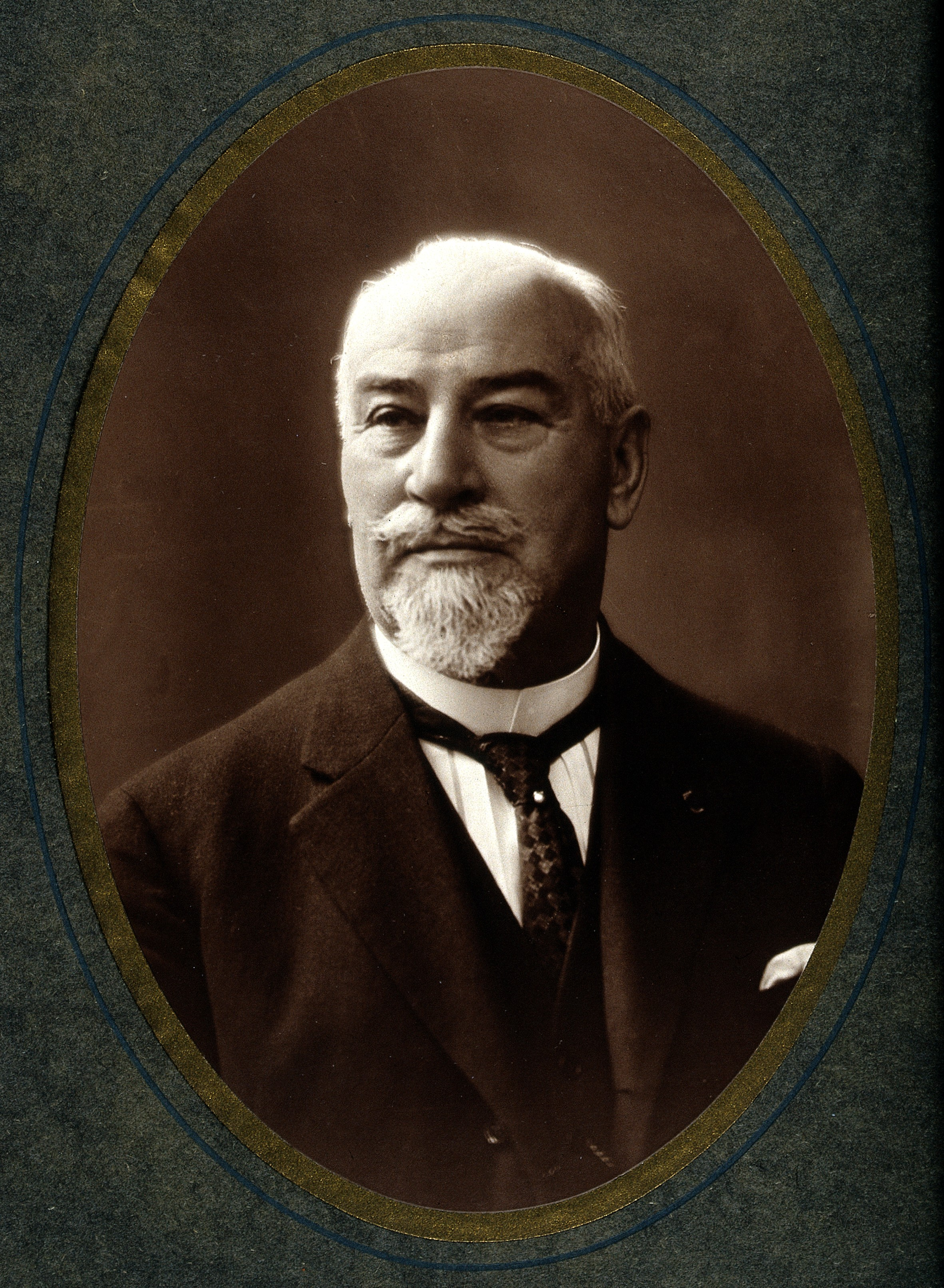
Emile-Jean Moure. Photograph by J. Serini.

Émile Moure (08 January 1855 - 28 November 1941) was a French doctor who was considered a pioneer in the field of otorhinolaryngology (ENT).

== Early life ==
Moure was born in Bordeaux in the Gironde department of France in 1855. In 1874, at the age of 19, he moved from Bordeaux to Paris to study medicine.

== Career ==
Until the mid-nineteenth century, ENT infections were typically treated as separate medical conditions. Moure and his contemporaries sought to create an integrated approach for the management and treatment of these conditions having observed clinical practices outside of France in countries such as Germany, Austria, Russia, and Great Britain.

In 1880, Moure returned to Bordeaux and founded both the monthly journal, Revue de Laryngologie, and a private ENT clinic (the current Saint-Augustin clinic) to provide specialised training to doctors from France and abroad. Due to ENT being a relatively new discipline, this clinic was the first of its kind in France.

In 1882, he founded the Société française d'otologie et de laryngologie (French Society of Otology and Laryngology) to provide such training, and later became president of the society in 1889. The society was later renamed the Société française d’otologie, de laryngologie et de rhinologie (SFORL) (French Society of Otology, Laryngology and Rhinology) in 1892. He was appointed lecturer of the clinic in 1890, assistant professor in 1902, and professor in 1912, subsequently assuming the ENT Chair in 1913.

During the First World War, Moure served in various capacities, such as the Chef du Centre de Spécialité (Head of the Speciality Centre) of the 18th Region, technical advisor to the Ministry of War, and army inspector.

In the field of laryngology specifically, Moure made notable contributions by introducing the use of cocaine as treatment, and pioneering endoscopic techniques for examining the upper respiratory and digestive tracts.

== Family ==
His son-in-law Georges Portmann was an ENT specialist and member of the French Senate for Gironde. He was appointed as Moure's successor at the clinic, eventually becoming the clinical lead in 1920, an associate professor in 1923, and eventually the ENT Chair at the Faculty of Medicine between 1924 and 1963, as well as the faculty dean between 1949 and 1955.

His grandson Michel Portman achieved global recognition as one of the foremost specialists in otorhinolaryngology, notably in the field of electrocochleography. He became an associate professor in 1955, held the ENT chair like his father and grandfather in 1978, and became an honorary professor at Bordeaux Segalen University. As a researcher, he founded the Laboratoire d'audiologie expérimentale (now Inserm) in Bordeaux. His wife Claudine Portmann was also recognised in the field of audiology.

His great-grandson Didier Portmann also pursued a career in otorhinolaryngology. He currently serves as director of the Georges-Portmann Institute and editor of the Revue de laryngologie.

His son Paul Moure was a surgeon in Paris and was known for his work with vascular grafts.

== Published works ==
Moure wrote various educational works during his career. Some of his notable publications include:

- Manuel pratique des Fosses nasales (1886)
- Leçons sur les Maladies du Larynx (1890)
- Traité des Maladies de la Gorge (1904)
- Plaies de Guerre du Larynx et de la Trachée (1904)
- Technique chirurgicale (written in two volumes) (1904)
