= Françoise Cartron =

French politician

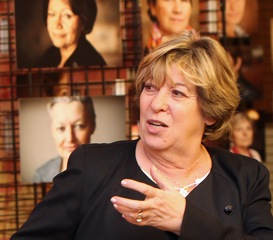
Françoise Cartron

Françoise Cartron (born 27 March 1949) is a member of the Senate of France, representing the Gironde department. She is a member of the Socialist Party.

Before being elected as a member of the senate on 21 September 2008, Cartron was a primary school headteacher. She is also the mayor of Artigues-près-Bordeaux, a vice-president of the Aquitaine Regional Council and of the Urban Community of Bordeaux.

== Bibliography ==
- Page on the Senate website
