= Pascale Got =

French politician (born 1961)

Member of the National Assembly for Gironde's 5th constituency
- Incumbent
- Assumed office 8 July 2024
- Preceded by: Grégoire de Fournas
- In office 20 June 2007 – 20 June 2017
- Preceded by: Jean-François Régère
- Succeeded by: Benoît Simian

Member of the Departmental Council of Gironde for the Le Sud-Médoc Castelnau-de-Médoc (2011–2015)
- Incumbent
- Assumed office 31 March 2011 Serving with Dominique Fedieu
- Preceded by: Yves Lecaudey

Secretary of the National Assembly
- In office 27 June 2012 – 20 June 2017

Personal details
- Born: 1 April 1961 (age 65) Royan, France
- Party: Socialist Party
- Education: Bordeaux Aquitaine Institute of Journalism

Pascale Got (French pronunciation: [paskal ɡo]; born 1 April 1961) is a French politician who has served as the deputy for Gironde's 5th constituency in the National Assembly since 2024. A member of the Socialist Party, she represented the same constituency in the Assembly from 2007 to 2017 and has sat on the Departmental Council of Gironde for the Canton of Le Sud-Médoc since 2011.

== Biography ==
Pascale Got was born on 1 April 1961 in Royan, France. She graduated from the Bordeaux Aquitaine Institute of Journalism in 1985 and worked as a journalist before entering politics. A member of the Socialist Party, Panot was first elected to the National Assembly in Gironde's 5th constituency during the 2007 French legislative elections. The race saw her defeat incumbent Jean-François Régère of the Union for a Popular Movement (UMP) in the run-off with 50.4% of the vote. In 2011, Got was elected to the General Council of Gironde, representing the canton of Castelnau-de-Médoc. She was re-elected in the 2015 departmental elections and currently serves alongside Dominique Fedieu.

Got was re-elected to the National Assembly in the 2012 legislative elections, defeating the UMP's David-Gordon Krief and increasing her mandate to 61.9% of the vote. She was also elected as one the Assembly's secretaries on 27 June 2012, making her a member of its Bureau. In 2017, Got lost re-election to La République En Marche's Benoît Simian, who won 50.5% of the vote to her 49.5%. She was re-nominated by the Socialists, who were now part of the New Popular Front, in her old constituency for the 2024 legislative elections. Got narrowly defeated incumbent Grégoire de Fournas of the National Rally in the run-off to return to the National Assembly, benefiting from the withdrawal of third-placed Horizons candidate Stéphane Sense.
