= Montussan =

- Commune
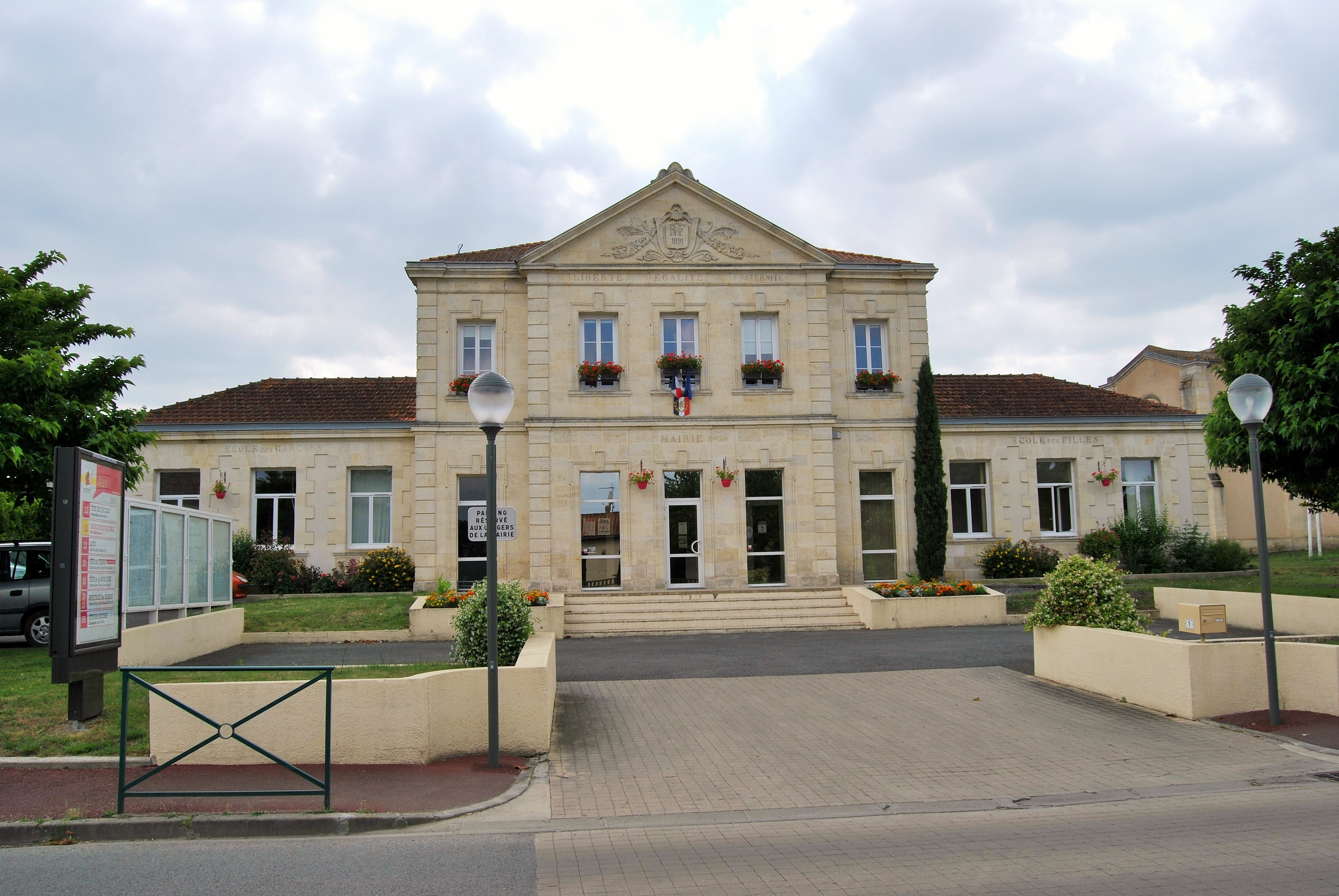
- The town hall in Montussan

- Coat of arms
- Location of Montussan
- Location within France Location within Nouvelle-Aquitaine
- Coordinates: 44°52′57″N 0°25′38″W
- Country: France
- Region: Nouvelle-Aquitaine
- Department: Gironde
- Arrondissement: Bordeaux
- Canton: Lormont
- Intercommunality: CC Les Rives de la Laurence

Government
  - Mayor (2020–2026): Frédéric Dupic
- Area^{1}: 8.3 km^{2} (3.2 sq mi)
- Elevation: 58 m (190 ft)
- Highest elevation: 88 m (289 ft)
- Lowest elevation: 7 m (23 ft)
- Population (2023): 3,628
  - Density: 440/km^{2} (1,100/sq mi)
- Time zone: UTC+01:00 (CET)
  - Summer (DST): UTC+02:00 (CEST)
- INSEE/Postal code: 33293 /33450
- ^{1} French Land Register data, which excludes lakes, ponds, glaciers > 1 km^{2} (0.386 sq mi or 247 acres) and river estuaries.

Montussan (French pronunciation: [mɔ̃tysɑ̃]; Occitan: Montuçan) is a commune in the Gironde department in Nouvelle-Aquitaine in southwestern France.

== Population ==
Historical population
Year	Pop.	±% p.a.
1968	1,024	—
1975	1,233	+2.69%
1982	1,727	+4.93%
1990	1,903	+1.22%
1999	2,207	+1.66%
2007	2,598	+2.06%
2012	3,002	+2.93%
2017	3,212	+1.36%
2023	3,628	+2.05%
Source: INSEE

== See also ==
- Communes of the Gironde department
