= Yvrac =

- Commune
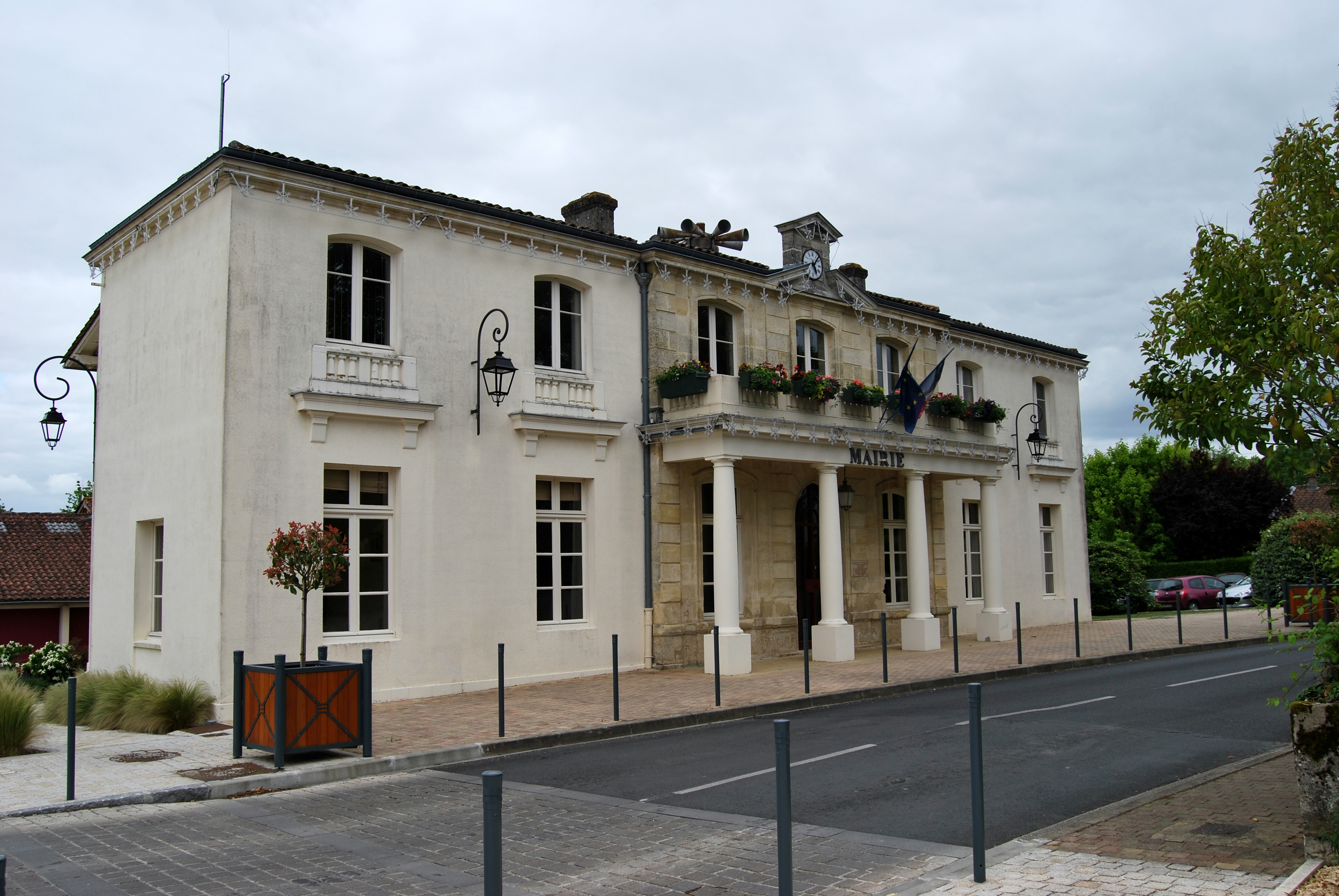
- The town hall in Yvrac
- Location of Yvrac
- Location within France Location within Nouvelle-Aquitaine
- Coordinates: 44°52′50″N 0°27′37″W
- Country: France
- Region: Nouvelle-Aquitaine
- Department: Gironde
- Arrondissement: Bordeaux
- Canton: Lormont
- Intercommunality: CC Les Rives de la Laurence

Government
  - Mayor (2024–2026): Olivier Lafeuillade
- Area^{1}: 8.49 km^{2} (3.28 sq mi)
- Highest elevation: 89 m (292 ft)
- Lowest elevation: 24 m (79 ft)
- Population (2023): 2,899
  - Density: 341/km^{2} (884/sq mi)
- Demonym(s): Yvracais, Yvracaises
- Time zone: UTC+01:00 (CET)
  - Summer (DST): UTC+02:00 (CEST)
- INSEE/Postal code: 33554 /33370
- ^{1} French Land Register data, which excludes lakes, ponds, glaciers > 1 km^{2} (0.386 sq mi or 247 acres) and river estuaries.

Yvrac (French pronunciation: [ivʁak]; Occitan: Ivrac) is a commune in the Gironde department in Nouvelle-Aquitaine in southwestern France.

== Population ==
Historical population

Year	Pop.	±% p.a.
1793	727	—
1800	609	−2.50%
1806	725	+2.95%
1821	670	−0.52%
1831	675	+0.07%
1841	714	+0.56%
1846	680	−0.97%
1851	694	+0.41%
1856	694	+0.00%
1861	723	+0.82%
1866	738	+0.41%
1872	789	+1.12%
1876	750	−1.26%
1881	736	−0.38%
1886	817	+2.11%
1891	773	−1.10%
1896	738	−0.92%
1901	769	+0.83%

Year	Pop.	±% p.a.
1906	762	−0.18%
1911	721	−1.10%
1921	796	+0.99%
1926	787	−0.23%
1931	770	−0.44%
1936	788	+0.46%
1946	759	−0.37%
1954	908	+2.27%
1962	1,012	+1.36%
1968	1,162	+2.33%
1975	1,651	+5.15%
1982	2,202	+4.20%
1990	2,185	−0.10%
1999	2,166	−0.10%
2007	2,310	+0.81%
2012	2,817	+4.05%
2017	2,812	−0.04%
2023	2,899	+0.51%

Source: EHESS (1793-1999) and INSEE

== See also ==
- Communes of the Gironde department
