= Château d'Eck =

Coordinates: 44°44′39″N 0°32′21″W

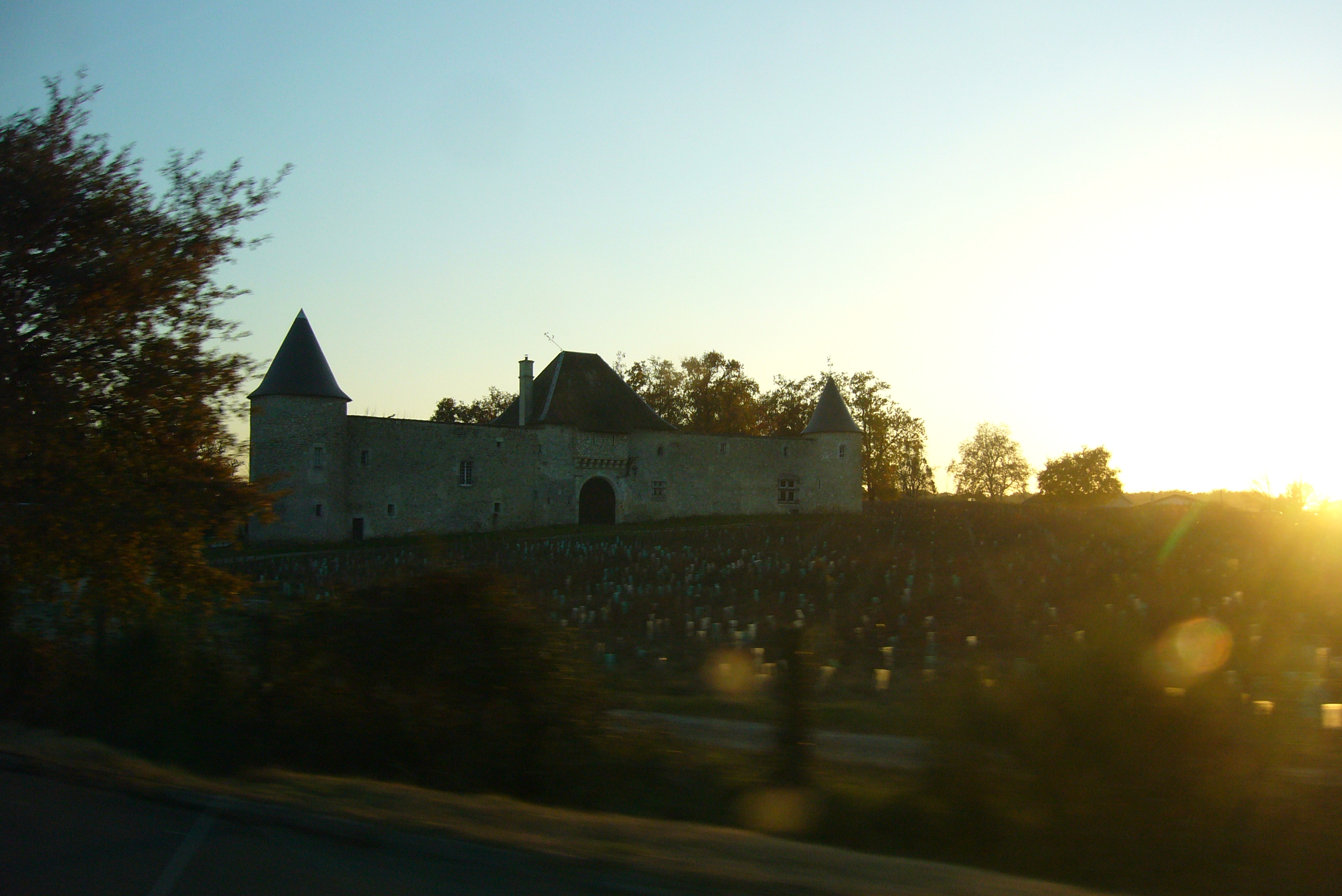

Château d'Eck is a château in Gironde, Nouvelle-Aquitaine, France.
