= Arrondissements of the Gironde department =

Arrondissements in Gironde, France with their populations

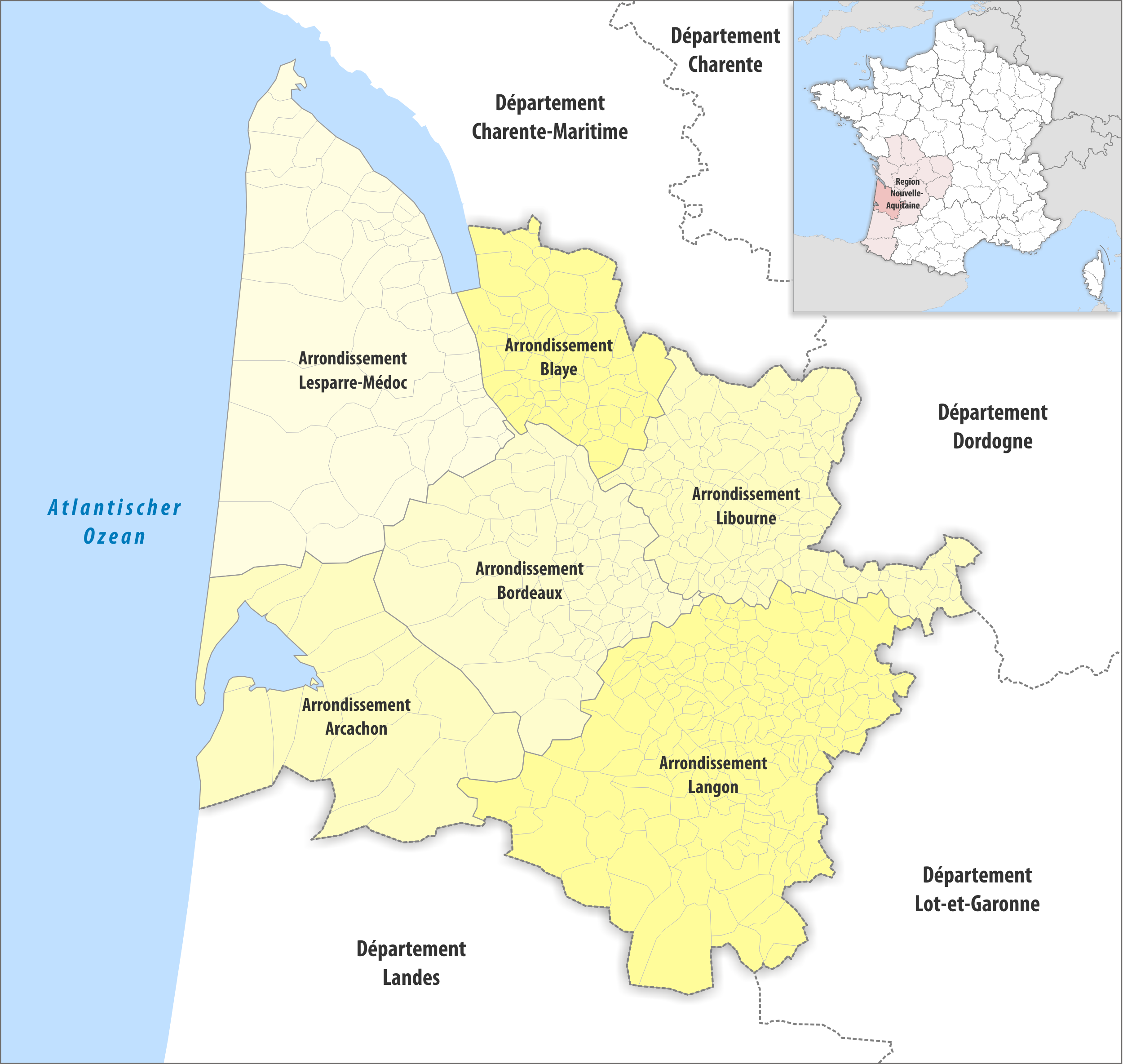
Map of arrondissements of the Gironde department.

The 6 arrondissements of the Gironde department are:

1. Arrondissement of Arcachon, (subprefecture: Arcachon) with 17 communes. The population of the arrondissement was 162,720 in 2021.
2. Arrondissement of Blaye, (subprefecture: Blaye) with 62 communes. The population of the arrondissement was 94,930 in 2021.
3. Arrondissement of Bordeaux, (prefecture of the Gironde department: Bordeaux) with 82 communes. The population of the arrondissement was 1,013,121 in 2021.
4. Arrondissement of Langon, (subprefecture: Langon) with 196 communes. The population of the arrondissement was 134,250 in 2021.
5. Arrondissement of Lesparre-Médoc, (subprefecture: Lesparre-Médoc) with 49 communes. The population of the arrondissement was 93,807 in 2021.
6. Arrondissement of Libourne, (subprefecture: Libourne) with 129 communes. The population of the arrondissement was 156,142 in 2021.

== History ==
In 1800 the arrondissements of Bordeaux, Bazas, Blaye, Lesparre, Libourne and La Réole were established. In 1926 the arrondissements of Lesparre and La Réole were disbanded, and Langon replaced Bazas as subprefecture. The arrondissement of Lesparre-Médoc was restored in 1942. At the May 2006 reorganisation of the arrondissements of Gironde, the arrondissement of Bordeaux absorbed the canton of Saint-André-de-Cubzac to the arrondissement of Blaye, the cantons of Cadillac and Podensac to the arrondissement of Langon and the canton of Castelnau-de-Médoc to the arrondissement of Lesparre-Médoc. The arrondissement of Arcachon was created in January 2007 from the four cantons of Arcachon, Audenge, Belin-Béliet and La Teste-de-Buch, that were previously part of the arrondissement of Bordeaux.
