= Loïc Prud'homme =

French politician (born 1969)

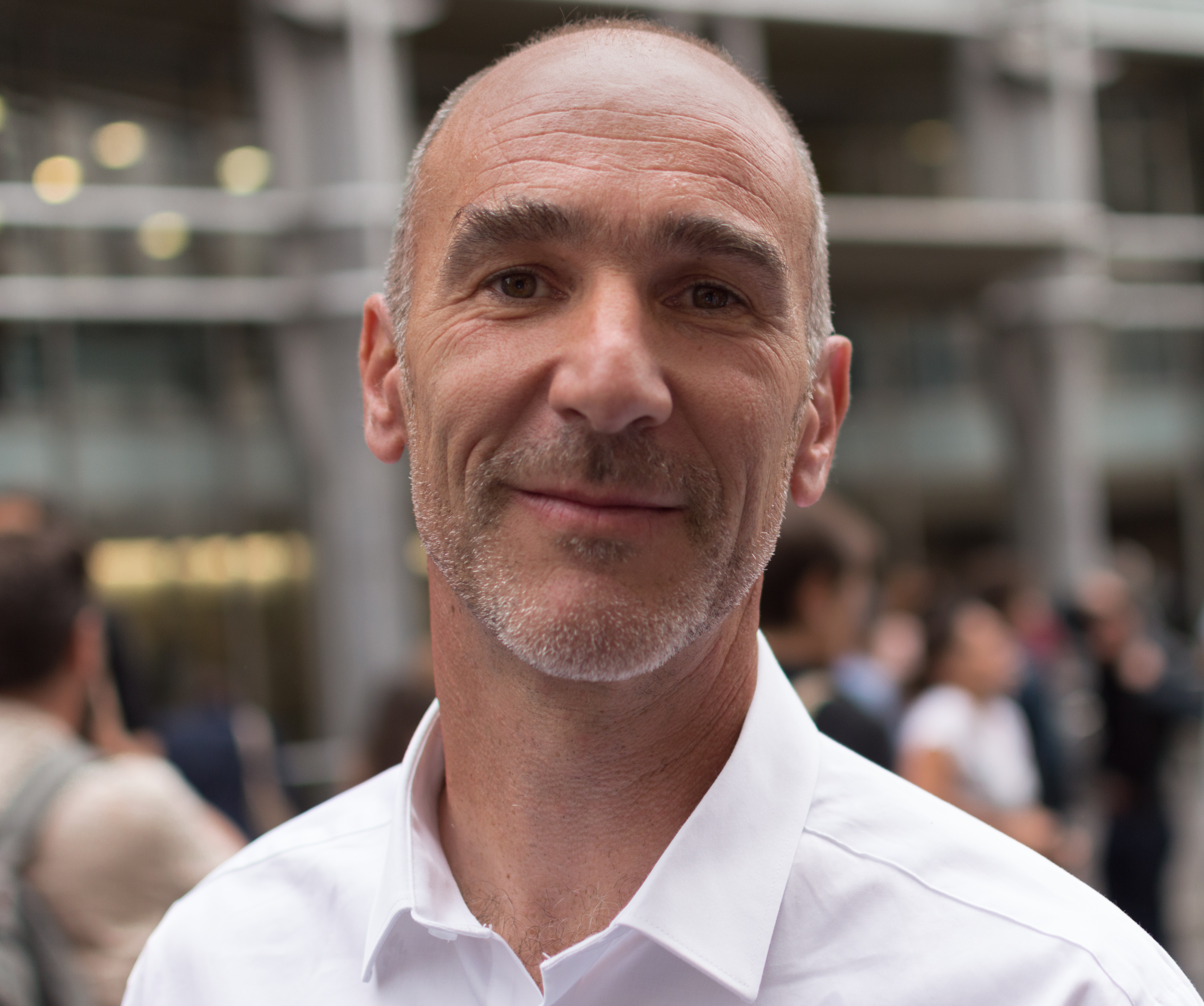
- Loïc Prud'homme in 2017

Member of the National Assembly for Gironde's 3rd constituency
- Incumbent
- Assumed office 21 June 2017
- Preceded by: Noël Mamère

Personal details
- Born: 19 August 1969 (age 56) Bègles, France
- Party: La France Insoumise
- Profession: Technician

Loïc Prud'homme (born 19 August 1969) is a French politician representing la France Insoumise. He was elected to the French National Assembly on 18 June 2017, representing Gironde's 3rd constituency.

== See also ==
- 2017 French legislative election
