= Gironde's 3rd constituency =

Constituency of the National Assembly of France

3rd constituency of Gironde
- inline Constituency of the National Assembly of France

- Location of constituency in Department

- Location of Gironde in France
- Deputy: Loïc Prud'homme; LFI
- Department: Gironde
- Cantons: Bègles, Bordeaux VI, Talence, Villenave-d'Ornon.

The 3rd constituency of the Gironde (French: Troisième circonscription de la Gironde) is a French legislative constituency in Gironde département. Like the other 576 French constituencies, it elects one MP using the two-round system, with a run-off if no candidate receives over 50% of the vote in the first round.

== Historical representation ==
Election	Member	Party
1958	Jacques Lavigne	UNR
1962	Jacques Lavigne	UNR
1967	Henri Deschamps	DVG
1968	Jacques Grondeau	UDR
1973	Henri Deschamps	DVG
1978	Henri Deschamps	PS
1981	Catherine Lalumière	PS
1981	Marcel Join	PS
1986	Proportional representation - no election by constituency	
1988	Catherine Lalumière	PS
1989	Claude Barande	PS
1993	Jean-Claude Barran	RPR
1997	Noël Mamère	LV
2002	Noël Mamère	LV
2007	Noël Mamère	LV
2012	Noël Mamère	EELV
2017	Loïc Prud'homme	LFI
2022	Loïc Prud'homme	LFI
2024	Loïc Prud'homme	LFI

== Election results ==
=== 2024 ===
Candidate	Party	Alliance	First round			Second round		
Candidate	Party	Alliance	Votes	%	+/–	Votes	%	+/–
Loïc Prud’homme	LFI	NFP	30,664	49.83	+5.06	32,525	53.84	-5.43
Ariane Ary	MoDem	Ensemble	17,080	27.75	-1.71	15,905	26.33	-14.40
Maryvonne Bastères	RN		12,037	19.56	+8.76	11,983	19.84	new
Cyrille Doumenge	REC		679	1.10	-1.74			
Jacques Guldner	LO		572	0.93	+0.22			
Flora Savino	DIV		305	0.50	+0.24			
Nathan Minivielle-Larrousse	DIV		196	0.32	new			
Johan Giraud-Girard	DIV		4	0.01	new			
Yacine Touzani	DIV		2	0.00	new			
Votes			61,539	100.00		60,413	100.00	
Valid votes			61,539	97.41	-0.68	60,413	97.77	+3.08
Blank votes			1,176	1.86	+0.42	985	1.59	-2.17
Null votes			463	0.73	+0.24	395	0.64	-0.91
Turnout			63,178	68.95	+18.88	61,793	67.41	+19.49
Abstentions			28,457	31.05	-18.88	29,871	32.59	-19.49
Registered voters			91,635			91,664		
Result			LFI HOLD					

=== 2022 ===
Legislative Election 2022: Gironde's 3rd constituency
Party	Candidate	Votes	%	±%
LFI (NUPÉS)	Loïc Prud'homme	19,730	44.89	+3.40
MoDem (Ensemble)	Fabien Robert	12,947	29.46	-4.31
RN	Maryvonne Basteres	4,748	10.80	+3.94
PRG	Yannick Boutot	2,273	5.17	N/A
UDI (UDC)	Asia Dayan	1,335	3.04	−5.44
REC	Cyrille Doumenge	1,248	2.84	N/A
Others	N/A	1,666		
Turnout		43,947	50.07	+0.83
2nd round result
LFI (NUPÉS)	Loïc Prud'homme	24,066	59.27	+9.07
MoDem (Ensemble)	Fabien Robert	16,541	40.73	−9.07
Turnout		40,607	47.92	+5.10
LFI hold				

=== 2017 ===
Candidate	Label	First round		Second round	
Candidate	Label	Votes	%	Votes	%
Marik Fetouh	REM	13,232	33.77	16,117	49.80
Loïc Prud'homme	FI	7,451	19.02	16,248	50.20
Naïma Charaï	PS	6,869	17.53		
Alexandre Gourd	LR	3,323	8.48		
Bruno Paluteau	FN	2,686	6.86		
Isabelle Taris	PCF	1,077	2.75		
Olivier Cazaux	ECO	857	2.19		
Dominique Dufour	DLF	411	1.05		
Badhia Messaoud	DIV	385	0.98		
Nathalie Le Guen	EXD	385	0.98		
Françoise Matha-Stepani	DVD	352	0.90		
Jean-Marc Ferrari	ECO	343	0.88		
Danielle Berdoyes	DIV	311	0.79		
Alain Perrier	DVG	280	0.71		
Cécile Teulon	ECO	248	0.63		
Sascha-Lou Rey-Capdepon	DIV	239	0.61		
Joël Chassaigne	DIV	218	0.56		
Éric Marhadour	EXG	213	0.54		
Thomas Holbing	ECO	176	0.45		
Wilfrid Issanga	DIV	65	0.17		
Pascal Chauvet	DIV	37	0.09		
Mikael Millac	DVD	22	0.06		
Votes		39,180	100.00	32,365	100.00
Valid votes		39,180	98.21	32,365	93.30
Blank votes		493	1.24	1,592	4.59
Null votes		221	0.55	734	2.12
Turnout		39,894	49.24	34,691	42.82
Abstentions		41,129	50.76	46,333	57.18
Registered voters		81,023		81,024	
Source: Ministry of the Interior

=== 2012 ===
2012 legislative election in Gironde's 3rd constituency
Candidate	Party	First round	
Candidate	Party	Votes	%
Noël Mamère	EELV	21,840	51.98%
Agnès Nedelec-Befve	UMP	6,094	14.50%
Céline Simon	FG	4,521	10.76%
Bruno Paluteau	FN	3,869	9.21%
Bernard Debuc	MoDem	3,476	8.27%
Maud Andrieux	DVG (BAG)	706	1.68%
Alain Mourguy	AEI	547	1.30%
Marie Faure	NPA	472	1.12%
Jean-Luc Venture	POI	214	0.51%
Pierre Pinto Bicho	LO	191	0.45%
Christophe Martins	PP	90	0.21%
Valid votes		42,020	98.26%
Spoilt and null votes		742	1.74%
Votes cast / turnout		42,762	57.61%
Abstentions		31,461	42.39%
Registered voters		74,223	100.00%

=== 2007 ===
Legislative Election 2007: Gironde's 3rd constituency
Party	Candidate	Votes	%	±%
LV	Noël Mamère	17,725	39.82	
UMP	Elisabeth Vigne	12,650	28.42	
MoDem	Marie-Françoise Lire	4,740	10.65	
PCF	Jean-Jacques Paris	3,900	8.76	
Far left	Patrick Brosse	1,407	3.16	
FN	Arnaud Lagrave	1,368	3.07	
Others	N/A	2,720		
Turnout		45,094	62.42	
2nd round result
LV	Noël Mamère	26,611	62.82	
UMP	Elisabeth Vigne	15,751	37.18	
Turnout		43,935	60.82	
LV hold				

=== 2002 ===
Legislative Election 2002: Gironde's 3rd constituency
Party	Candidate	Votes	%	±%
LV	Noël Mamère	16,787	38.50	+4.49
UDF	Alain Cazabonne	15,193	34.84	+9.86
PCF	Jean-Jacques Paris	4,262	9.77	−6.82
FN	Henri Sanchez	3,255	7.46	−2.81
CPNT	Janick Bergeon	926	2.12	
Others	N/A	3,182		
Turnout		44,365	68.33	+0.02
2nd round result
LV	Noël Mamère	21,475	54.64	−6.27
UDF	Alain Cazabonne	17,828	45.36	+6.27
Turnout		41,038	63.22	
LV gain from DVE				

=== 1997 ===
Legislative Election 1997: Gironde's 3rd constituency
Party	Candidate	Votes	%	±%
DVE	Noël Mamère	14,131	34.01	
RPR	Jean-Claude Barran	10,380	24.98	
PCF	Jean-Jacques Paris	6,892	16.59	
FN	Henri Lastrade	4,266	10.27	
GE	Philippe Coat	1,022	2.46	
LO	Solange Texier	987	2.38	
DVD	Elzear de Sabran-Ponteves	835	2.01	
Others	N/A	3,041		
Turnout		43,156	68.31	
2nd round result
DVE	Noël Mamère	25,515	60.91	
RPR	Jean-Claude Barran	16,375	39.09	
Turnout		44,934	71.13	
DVE gain from RPR				

== Sources ==
- French Interior Ministry results website: "Résultats électoraux officiels en France" (in French).
