= Jacques Valade =

French academic, politician and diplomat (1930–2023)

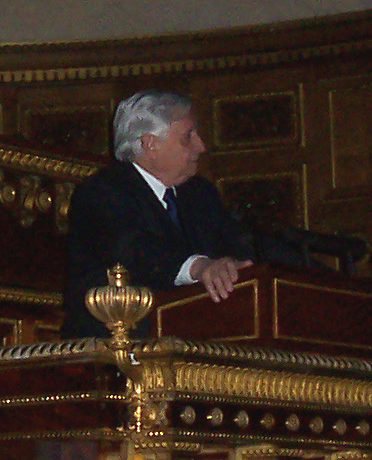
- Valade in 2007

Minister Delegate for Research and Higher Education
- In office 20 January 1987 – 10 May 1988
- Prime Minister: Jacques Chirac
- Preceded by: Alain Devaquet
- Succeeded by: Hubert Curien

President of the Regional Council of Aquitaine
- In office 27 March 1992 – 20 March 1998
- Preceded by: Jean Tavernier
- Succeeded by: Alain Rousset

President of the General Council of Gironde
- In office 22 March 1985 – 2 October 1988
- Preceded by: Philippe Madrelle
- Succeeded by: Philippe Marelle

Senator for Gironde
- In office 2 October 1989 – 30 September 2008
- In office 2 October 1980 – 19 February 1987

Member of the National Assembly for Gironde's 2nd constituency
- In office 20 October 1970 – 1 April 1973
- Preceded by: Jacques Chaban-Delmas
- Succeeded by: Jacques Chaban-Delmas

Personal details
- Born: 4 May 1930 Bordeaux, France
- Died: 3 October 2023 (aged 93) Bordeaux, France
- Party: UDR (until 1976); RPR (1976–2002); UMP (from 2002)

Jacques Valade (French pronunciation: [ʒak valad]; 4 May 1930 – 3 October 2023) was a French academic and politician who served as Minister Delegate for Research and Higher Education from 1987 to 1988 under Prime Minister Jacques Chirac. He also presided over the General Council of Gironde from 1985 to 1988 and the Regional Council of Aquitaine from 1992 to 1998.

== Career ==
=== Scientific career ===
A chemical engineer, he obtained a thesis in organic chemistry in 1950, and became an assistant and then an associate professor at the Bordeaux Faculty of Science in 1960. He was Professor at the University of Bordeaux (1963–1987), Dean of the Faculty of Science (1968–1970), and Director of the Institut du Pin (1969–1974), a public-private institute for the study and development of chemical components and derivatives from maritime pine in Bordeaux.

=== Local political career ===
At the same time, he took on local political responsibilities, serving as a deputy to the Bordeaux mayor (Jacques Chaban-Delmas, then Alain Juppé), from 1971 to 2001 (first deputy from 1977 to 1992), President of the General Council of the Gironde department from 1985 to 1988 (elected in the canton of Bordeaux-4, 1970–1989), and President of the Regional Council of Aquitaine from 1992 to 1998.

=== National political career ===
He was the deputy for Gironde's 2nd constituency from 1970 to 1973 (as Chaban-Delmas's substitute) and a senator for Gironde from 1980 to 1987 and again from 1989 to 2008 (Vice-President of the Senate, 1995–2001; Chairman of the Senate Cultural Affairs Committee, 2001–2008), and Minister Delegate for Research and Higher Education from 1987 to 1988 in Jacques Chirac's second government. He did not run for reelection to the Senate in 2008. From 2008 to 2015, he was appointed ambassador-at-large for French decentralised cooperation in Asia.

== Honours and distinctions ==
- Officer of Legion of Honour in 2008 (Knight in 1978)
- Commander of Ordre des Palmes académiques in 1989
- Order of the Rising Sun (Japan)
- Order of the Three Stars (Latvia)
- Order of the Equatorial Star (Gabon)
- On 26 April 1984, he was elected as a resident member of the Académie nationale des sciences, belles-lettres et arts de Bordeaux (National Academy of Science, Art and Literature of Bordeaux) in chair no. 5.

Valade died on 3 October 2023 in Bordeaux, at age 93.
