= Gironde's 5th constituency =

Constituency of the National Assembly of France

5th constituency of Gironde
- inline Constituency of the National Assembly of France

- Location of constituency in Department

- Location of Gironde in France
- Deputy: Pascale Got; PS
- Department: Gironde
- Cantons: (pre-2015) Blanquefort, Castelnau-de-Médoc, Lesparre-Médoc, Pauillac, Saint-Laurent-Médoc, Saint-Vivien-de-Médoc.

The 5th constituency of the Gironde (French: Cinquième circonscription de la Gironde) is a French legislative constituency in Gironde département. Like the other 576 French constituencies, it elects one MP using the two-round system, with a run-off if no candidate receives over 50% of the vote in the first round.

Election	Member	Party
1988	Pierre Brana	PS
1993	Xavier Pintat	UDF
1997	Pierre Brana	PS
2002	Jean-François Régère	UMP
2007	Pascale Got	PS
2012	Pascale Got	PS
2017	Benoît Simian	LREM
2022	Grégoire De Fournas	RN
2024	Pascale Got	PS

== Election results ==
=== 2024 ===
Candidate	Party	Alliance	First round			Second round		
Candidate	Party	Alliance	Votes	%	+/–	Votes	%	+/–
Grégorie De Fournas	RN		35,457	42.32	+13.77	39,656	49.37	-3.91
Pascale Got	PS	NFP	26,631	31.79	-5.87	40,665	50.63	+3.91
Stéphane Sence	HOR	Ensemble	15,576	18.59	-6.88	withdrew		
Benoït Simian	DIV		3,041	3.63	new			
Laurent Toussaint	LR	UDC	2,218	2.65	-1.61			
Thierry Fagegaltier	LO		858	1.02	-0.27			
Votes			83,781	100.00		80,321	100.00	
Valid votes			83,781	97.37	-0.03	80,321	93.17	+7.89
Blank votes			1,641	1.91	+0.06	4,525	5.25	-5.98
Null votes			618	0.72	-0.03	1,360	1.58	-1.90
Turnout			86,040	69.92	+20.36	86,206	70.04	+22.28
Abstentions			37,023	30.08	-20.36	36,874	29.96	-22.28
Registered voters			123,063			123,080		
Result			PS GAIN FROM RN					

=== 2022 ===
Legislative Election 2022: Gironde's 5th constituency
Party	Candidate	Votes	%	±%
RN	Grégoire De Fournas	16,672	28.55	+12.58
LFI (NUPÉS)	Olivier Maneiro	15,134	25.92	-9.00
HOR (Ensemble)	Karine Nouette Gaulain	14,876	25.47	−7.94
LR (UDC)	Viviane Chaine-Ribeiro	2,486	4.26	−5.26
LMR	Stéphane Sence	2,472	4.23	N/A
REC	Roxane Maury	2,257	3.86	N/A
LREM	Benoît Simian*	2,150	3.68	N/A
Others	N/A	2,351		
Turnout		58,397	49.56	−1.10
2nd round result
RN	Grégoire De Fournas	26,263	53.28	N/A
LFI (NUPÉS)	Olivier Maneiro	23,026	46.72	−2.82
Turnout		49,289	47.76	+5.50
RN gain from LREM				

* LREM dissident

=== 2017 ===
Candidate	Label	First round		Second round	
Candidate	Label	Votes	%	Votes	%
Benoît Simian	REM	18,399	33.41	21,011	50.46
Pascale Got	PS	10,220	18.56	20,632	49.54
Grégoire de Fournas	FN	8,794	15.97		
Martine Calvo	FI	6,229	11.31		
Florence Legrand	LR	5,242	9.52		
Stéphane Saubusse	ECO	1,862	3.38		
Sonia Colemyn	DLF	1,302	2.36		
Christophe Capelli	DVD	972	1.76		
Stéphane Le Bot	PCF	921	1.67		
Julien Brard	DIV	329	0.60		
François-Régis Taveau	EXD	328	0.60		
Rémy Coste	EXG	301	0.55		
Thi Be Nguyen	DIV	176	0.32		
Votes		55,075	100.00	41,643	100.00
Valid votes		55,075	98.36	41,643	89.16
Blank votes		631	1.13	3,273	7.01
Null votes		288	0.51	1,792	3.84
Turnout		55,994	50.66	46,708	42.26
Abstentions		54,525	49.34	63,806	57.74
Registered voters		110,519		110,514	
Source: Ministry of the Interior

=== 2012 ===
2012 legislative election in Gironde's 5th constituency
Candidate	Party	First round		Second round	
Candidate	Party	Votes	%	Votes	%
Pascale Got	PS	27,011	45.37%	34,453	61.91%
David Gordon-Krief	UMP	13,534	22.73%	21,203	38.10%
Jacques Colombier	FN	9,168	15.40%		
Stéphane Le Bot	FG	2,620	4.40%		
Stéphane Saubusse	EELV	1,627	2.73%		
Jean-Marc Lasserre	DVD	1,608	2.70%		
Jean-Louis Albentosa	MoDem	1,419	2.38%		
Philippe Poutou	NPA	1,264	2.12%		
Jean Martin	PR	527	0.89%		
Martine Rodriguez	DLR	339	0.57%		
Géraldine Da Cunha	AEI	288	0.48%		
Marouani Ben Hadj Salem	LO	131	0.22%		
Valid votes		59,536	98.74%	55,654	96.62%
Spoilt and null votes		758	1.26%	1,949	3.38%
Votes cast / turnout		60,294	58.82%	57,603	55.65%
Abstentions		42,205	41.18%	45,913	44.35%
Registered voters		102,499	100.00%	103,516	100.00%

=== 2007 ===
Legislative Election 2007: Gironde's 5th constituency
Party	Candidate	Votes	%	±%
UMP	Jean-François Régère	22,832	39.01	
PS	Pascale Got	16,450	28.11	
MoDem	Joan Taris	6,276	10.72	
CPNT	Jean-Francis Seguy	3,164	5.41	
FN	Denis Lemoine	2,437	4.16	
LV	Stéphane Saubusse	2,209	3.77	
PCF	Conchita Cimbron	1,632	2.79	
Far left	Philippe Poutou	1,632	2.70	
Others	N/A	1,942		
Turnout		59,601	62.35	
2nd round result
PS	Pascale Got	29,179	50.37	
UMP	Jean-François Régère	28,745	49.63	
Turnout		59,813	62.57	
PS gain from UDF				

=== 2002 ===
Legislative Election 2002: Gironde's 5th constituency
Party	Candidate	Votes	%	±%
PS	Pierre Brana	17,652	31.05	
UDF	Jean-François Régère	16,474	28.97	
CPNT	Henri Sabarot	7,249	12.75	
FN	Denis Lemoine	6,515	11.46	
LV	Isabelle Maille	1,801	3.17	
RPF	Virginie Cerutti	1,685	2.96	
PCF	Joelle Gardelle	1,346	2.37	
Others	N/A	3,052		
Turnout		57,845	67.08	
2nd round result
UDF	Jean-François Régère	27,427	52.90	
PS	Pierre Brana	24,421	47.10	
Turnout		53,879	62.48	
UDF gain from PS				

=== 1997 ===
Legislative Election 1997: Gironde's 5th constituency
Party	Candidate	Votes	%	±%
PS	Pierre Brana	18,024	33.68	
UDF	Xavier Pintat	16,846	31.48	
FN	Jean-Philippe Lavalette	7,898	14.76	
PCF	Conception Cimbron	4,071	7.61	
LV	Annie Gaillat	1,503	2.81	
Others	N/A	5,179		
Turnout		56,290	70.65	
2nd round result
PS	Pierre Brana	31,013	54.89	
UDF	Xavier Pintat	25,489	45.11	
Turnout		59,854	75.12	
PS gain from UDF				

== References and Sources ==
- French Interior Ministry results website: "Résultats électoraux officiels en France" (in French).
