= Benoît Simian =

French politician (born 1983)

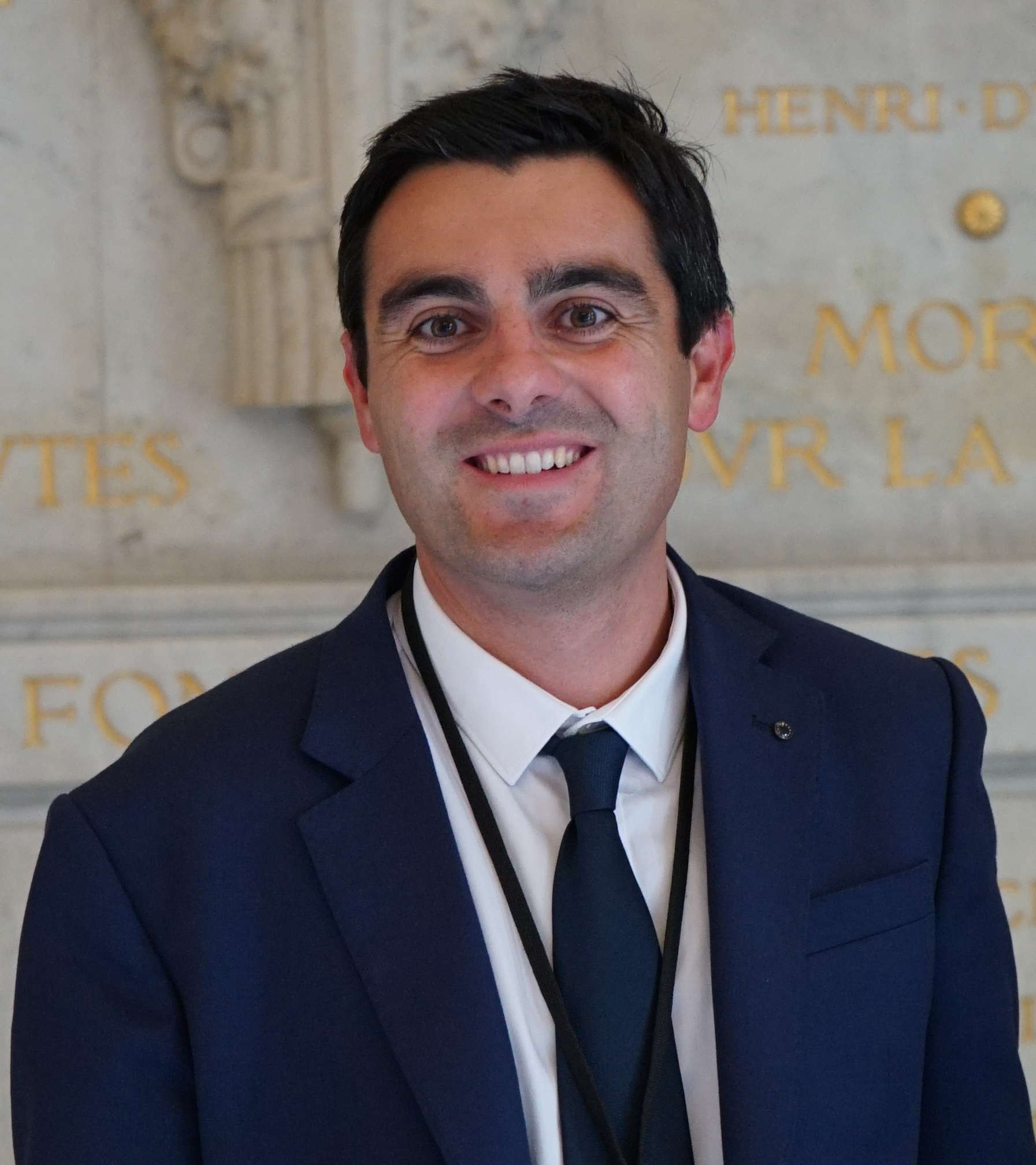

Member of the French National Assembly for Gironde's 5th constituency
- In office 21 June 2017 – June 2022
- Preceded by: Pascale Got
- Succeeded by: Grégoire de Fournas

Mayor of Ludon-Médoc
- In office 2014–2017
- Preceded by: Joseph Forter
- Succeeded by: Philippe Ducamp

Personal details
- Born: 27 May 1983 (age 42) Bordeaux, France
- Political party: En Marche!
- Profession: Human Resource Manager

Benoît Simian (born 27 May 1983) is a French politician of La République En Marche! (LREM) who served as a member of the French National Assembly for Gironde's 5th constituency from 2017 to 2022.

== Political career ==
In parliament, Simian serves as member of the Finance Committee and the Committee on European Affairs. In addition to his committee assignments, he is part of the parliamentary friendship groups with Croatia and Spain.

At the initiative of Simian and Jean-Bernard Sempastous, some twenty LREM deputies who had been elected in rural areas established their interest group within the party's parliamentary group in September 2018. He joined the Horizons group.

He lost his seat in the first round of the 2022 French legislative election.

== Political positions ==
In July 2019, Simian voted in favor of the French ratification of the European Union’s Comprehensive Economic and Trade Agreement (CETA) with Canada.
