= Xavier Pintat =

French politician

Xavier Pintat (born 15 March 1954 in Bordeaux, Gironde) is a member of the Senate of France, representing the Gironde department. He is a member of the Union for a Popular Movement. He is the son of Jean-François Pintat, a politician.

== Biography ==
Engineer at the CEA by profession, Pintat was elected senator of the Gironde on 27 September 1998 and reelected in September 2008.

== Former terms ==
Member of the Gironde from 1993 to 1997.

Member of the French parliamentary delegation of the Parliamentary Assembly of the Council of Europe.

Member of the French parliamentary delegation to the Assembly of the Western European Union
