= Jean-François Pintat =

French politician (1923–90)

Senator for Gironde
- In office 26 July 1971 – 14 June 1990

Personal details
- Born: 29 July 1923 Bordeaux, Gironde, France
- Died: 14 June 1990 (aged 66) Soulac-sur-Mer, Gironde, France

Jean-François Pintat (French: [ʒɑ̃ fʁɑ̃swa pɛ̃ta]; 29 July 1923 – 14 June 1990) was a French engineer and politician. Pintat was the Senator for Gironde from 1971 to 1990.

== Early life ==
Jean-François Pintat was born on 29 July 1923 in Bordeaux, France. Pintat was an engineer. In 1965, Pintat hired Roland Etienne Blais at his driver, Blais would later become the mayor of Soulac-sur-Mer, where Pintat resided.

== Senate ==
Pintat was elected as the Senator for the department of Gironde on 26 September 1971. From 17 July 1979 to 23 July 1984, Pintat served as Vice-Chair of the Liberal and Democratic Group in the European Parliament. (Note: The Liberal and Democratic Group has been known as the Alliance of Liberals and Democrats for Europe Group since July 2004.)

He was re-elected to the Senate on 28 September 1980, and again on 24 September 1989.

On 14 June 1990, at the age of 66, Pintat died at his home in Soulac-sur-Mer, Gironde, France following a period of serious illness.

== Personal life ==
Pintat had a son, Xavier Pintat, who became mayor of Soulac-sur-Mer, an engineer, and a Senator for Gironde.
