= Philippe Madrelle =

French politician (1937–2019)

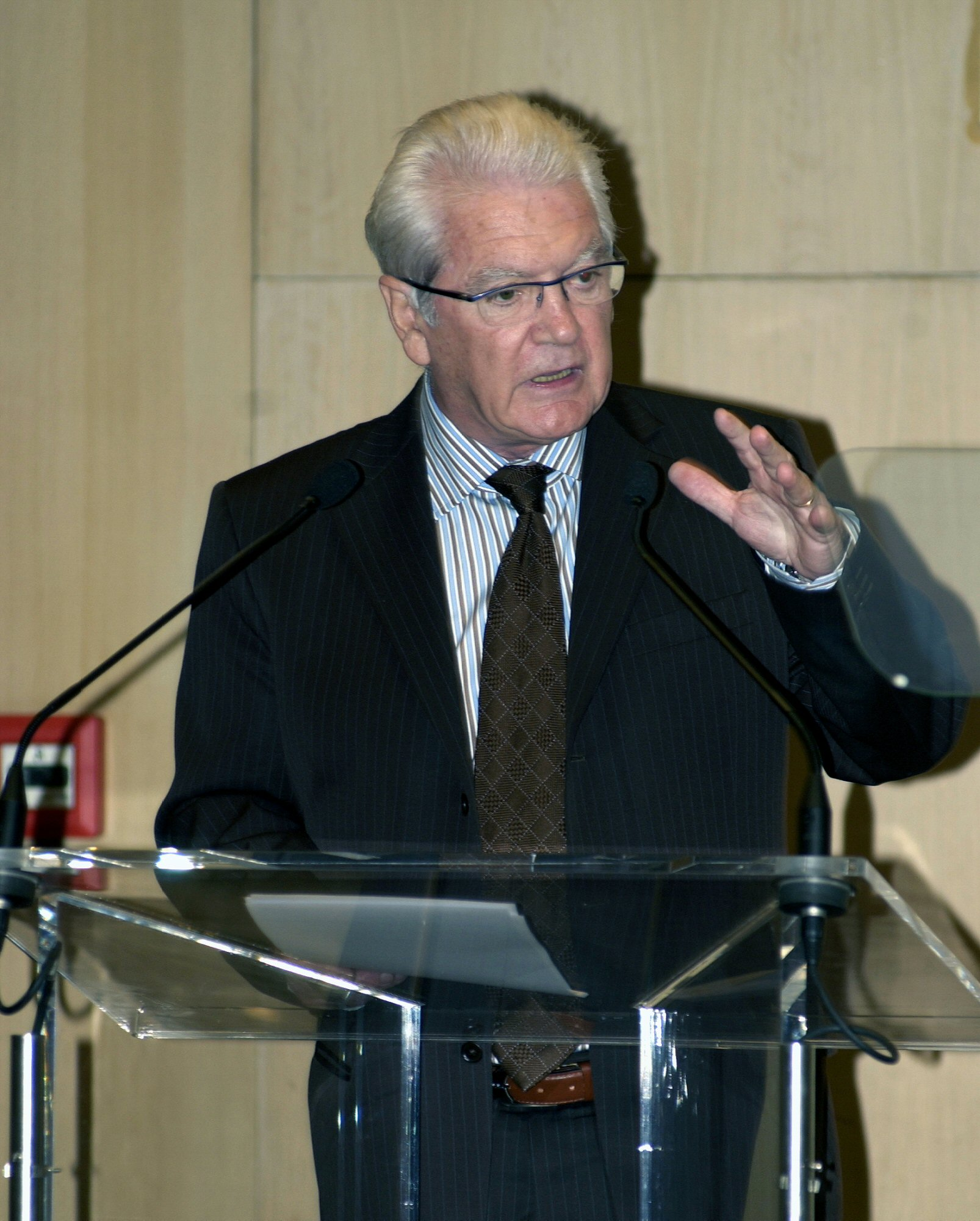
- Philippe Madrelle in 2011.

Member of the Senate for Gironde
- In office 1 October 1980 – 27 August 2019
- Succeeded by: Hervé Gillé
- Parliamentary group: SOC

President of the General Council of Gironde
- In office 1 October 1988 – 1 April 2015
- Preceded by: Jacques Valade
- Succeeded by: Jean-Luc Gleyze
- In office 19 March 1976 – 22 March 1985
- Preceded by: Raymond Brun
- Succeeded by: Jacques Valade

Mayor of Carbon-Blanc
- In office 15 March 1976 – 18 March 2001
- Succeeded by: Franck Maurras

General Councillor of Gironde
- In office 15 March 1968 – 1 April 2015
- Preceded by: René Cassage
- Succeeded by: Canton dissolved
- Constituency: Canton of Carbon-Blanc

President of the Regional Council of Aquitaine
- In office 1981–1985
- Preceded by: André Labarrère
- Succeeded by: Jacques Chaban-Delmas

Deputy for Gironde's 4th constituency
- Preceded by: René Cassagne
- Succeeded by: Pierre Garmendia
- Parliamentary group: FGDS (1968-1973); PSRG(1973-1978); SOC(1978-1980)
- Constituency: Gironde's 4th constituency

Personal details
- Born: 21 April 1937 Saint-Seurin-de-Cursac, France
- Died: 27 August 2019 (aged 82) Bordeaux, France
- Party: PS

Philippe Madrelle (21 April 1937 – 27 August 2019) was a French politician. A member of the Socialist Party, he served as a Deputy from the Gironde between 1968 and 1980, President of the General Council of Gironde between 1976 and 2015, and Senator from 1980 until his death.

== Biography ==
=== Political involvement ===
==== Senator for Gironde (1980—2019) ====
Madrelle was elected Senator for Gironde on 28 September 1980. He was re-elected on 24 September 1989, 27 September 1998, 21 September 2008, and 28 September 2014. From 1 October 2017, he became the longest serving active member of the Senate, succeeding Serge Dassault. He indicated that he wished to not represent himself again at the expiration of his senatorial mandate in 2020. He died of cancer on 27 August 2019 in Bordeaux.

== Summary of mandates ==
- Senator for Gironde (1980–2019)
- Deputy for Gironde's 4th constituency (1968–1980)
- President of the Regional Council of Aquitaine (1981–1985)
- Regional Councillor of Aquitaine (1986–1989)
- President of the General Council of Gironde (1976—1985 and 1988–2015)
- General Councillor of Gironde (1968–2015)
- Mayor of Carbon-Blanc (1976–2001)
