= Departmental Council of Gironde =

Departmental legislature in France

Departmental Council of Gironde Conseil départemental de la Gironde

Leadership
- President: Jean-Luc Gleyze, PS since 2 April 2015

Structure
- Seats: 66
- Political groups: Government (50): PS (33); LÉ (8); DVG (5); PCF (3); PP (1); Opposition (16): LR (6); DVD (5); Agir (2); UDI (2); MoDem (1); www.gironde.fr

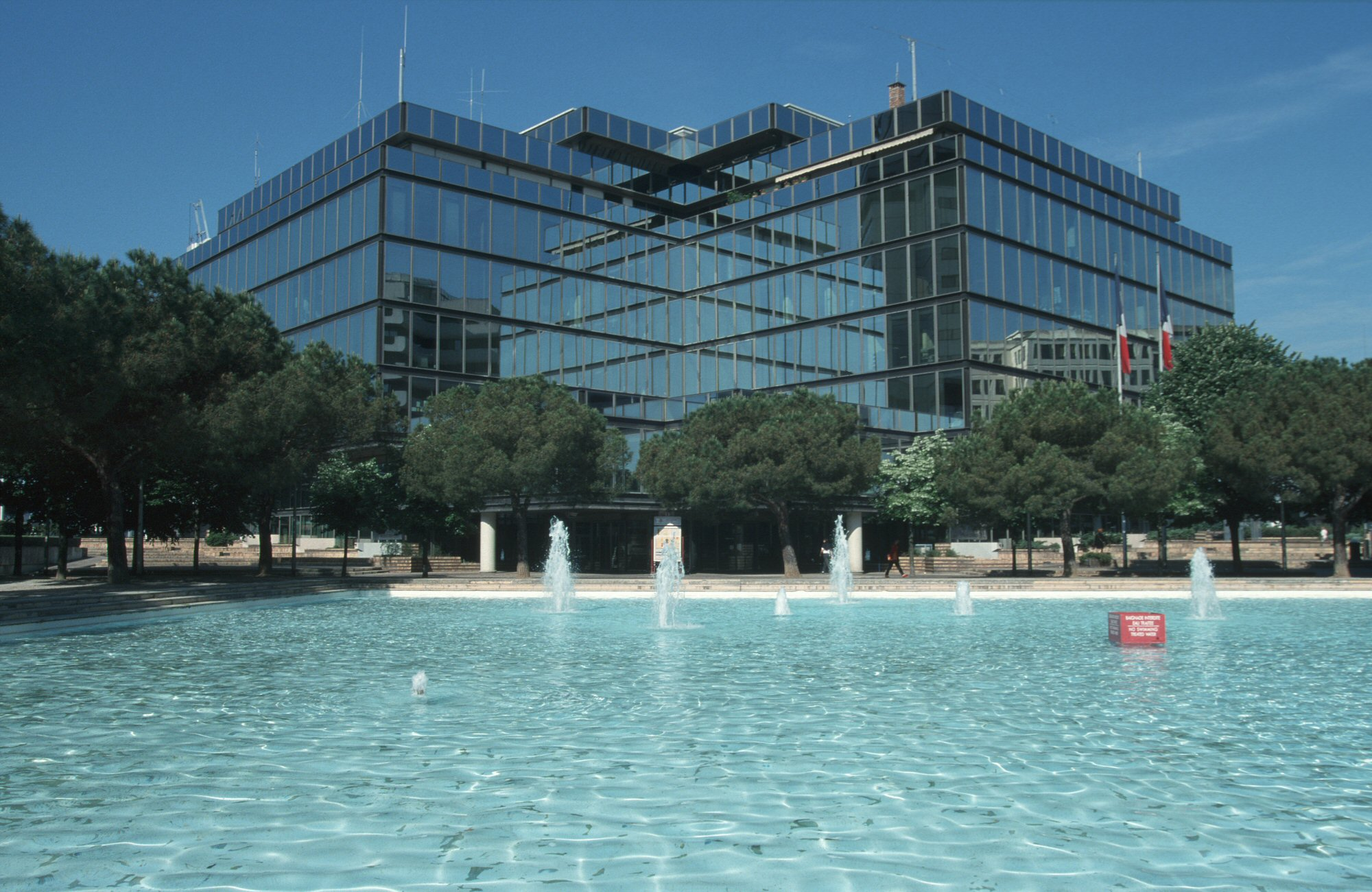
The headquarters of the department in Bordeaux

The Departmental Council of Gironde (French: Conseil départemental de la Gironde, Occitan: Conselh departamental de Gironda) is the deliberative assembly of the Gironde department in the region of Nouvelle-Aquitaine. It consists of 66 members (general councilors) from 33 cantons and its headquarters are in Bordeaux.

The President of the General Council is Jean-Luc Gleyze.

== Elected officials ==
=== President ===
List of successive presidents of the Departmental Council of Gironde
In office		Name	Party
President of the General Council of Gironde
September 1945	April 1951	Jean-Fernand Audeguil	SFIO
April 1951	March 1976	Raymond Brun	Radical then CNIP
March 1976	March 1985	Philippe Madrelle	PS
March 1985	October 1988	Jacques Valade	RPR
October 1988	March 2015	Philippe Madrelle	PS
President of the Departmental Council of Gironde
March 2015	Incumbent	Jean-Luc Gleyze	PS

=== Vice-Presidents ===
The President of the Departmental Council is assisted by 15 vice-presidents chosen from among the departmental advisers. Each of them has a delegation of authority.

List of vice-presidents of the Gironde Departmental Council (as of 2021)
Order	Name	Party	Canton (constituency)	Delegation
1st	Christine Bost	PS	Les Portes du Médoc	Territorial planning, cooperation and tourism
2nd	Arnaud Arfeuille	PS	Mérignac-2	General administration, finance and modernization of public action
3rd	Isabelle Dexpert	PS	Le Sud-Gironde	Educational policies, colleges
4th	Martine Jardiné	PS	Villenave-d'Ornon	Social development, prevention and parenting from infancy to youth
5th	Sébastien Saint-Pasteur	UGE	Pessac-2	Access to rights, health, digital, local public services and civic technology
6th	Laure Curvale	EELV	Pessac-1	Ecological transition and heritage
7th	Marie-Claude Agullana	DVG	L'Entre-Deux-Mers	Child protection
8th	Jean-François Egron	PS	Cenon	Disability, inclusion, adapted housing and mobility
9th	Pascale Got	PS	Le Sud-Médoc	Environmental protection, sensitive natural areas and risk management
10th	Stéphane Le Bot	UG	Le Nord-Médoc	Agriculture, food, seas and forests
11th	Sophie Piquemal	PS	Les Landes des Graves	Social emergency, housing, social and solidarity economy integration
12th	Carole Guère	PS	Mérignac-1	Associative, sporting and cultural dynamics
13th	Jean-Henri Galand	PS	Le Libournais-Fronsadais	Mobility and infrastructure
14th	Romain Dostes	EELV	Bordeaux-1	Seniors policy, inter-generational link
15th	Matthieu Mangin	PS	Bordeaux-5	Communication, information to citizens

== See also ==
- Gironde
- General councils of France
