= Georges Portmann =

French physician

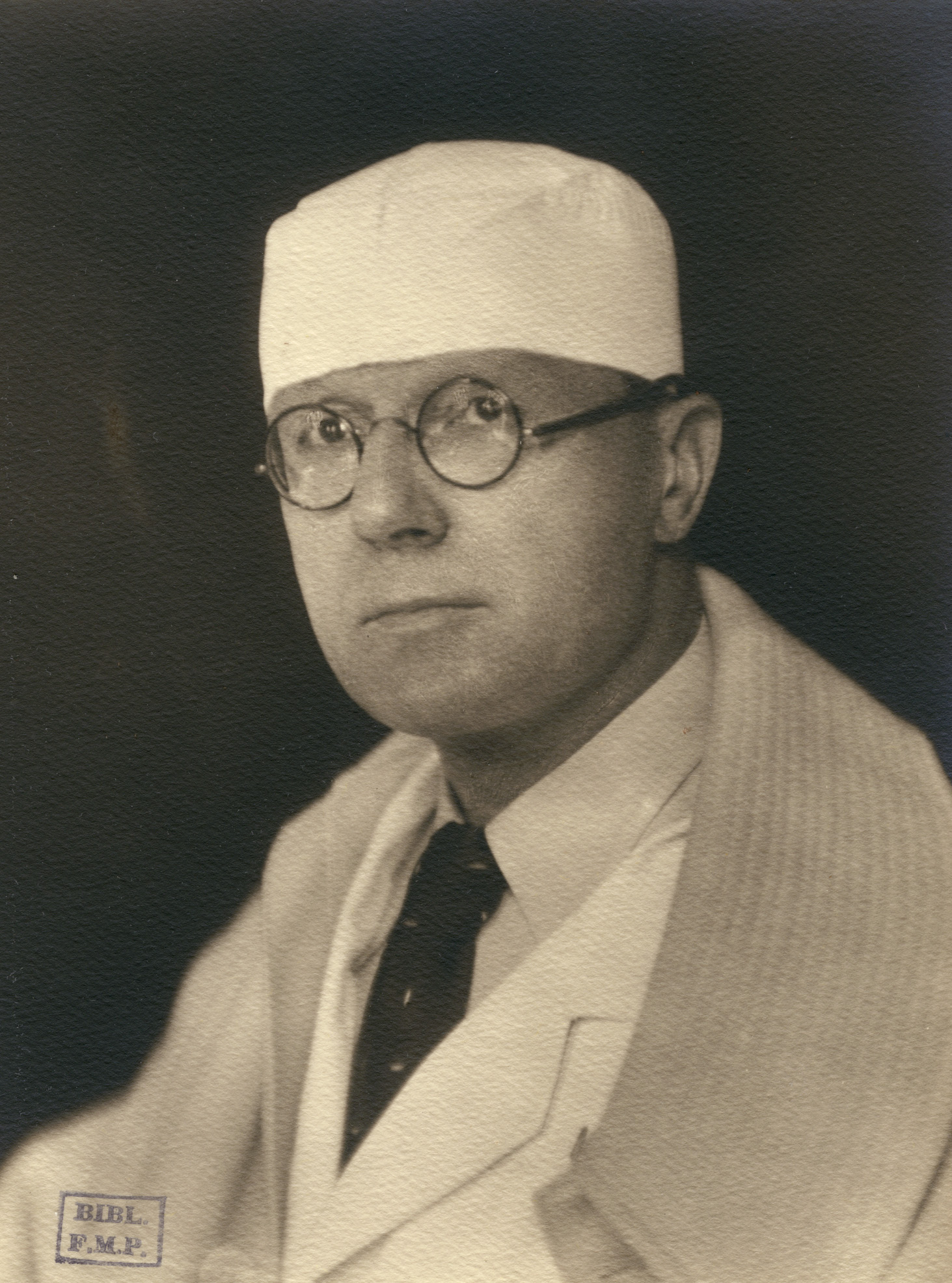
Georges Portmann

Georges Portmann (1 July 1890 – 24 February 1985) was a French teacher, physician and specialist in the field of otorhinolaryngology (ENT), and member of the French Senate for the département of Gironde.

== Early career ==
Portmann was born in Saint-Jean-de-Maurienne in the Savoie region of France on 1 July 1890. He studied Medicine at the École de Santé Navale et Coloniale (Naval and Colonial Health School, now named the École du service de santé des armées de Bordeaux), a military school in Bordeaux that provided training to naval doctors.

After completing his studies, he served briefly as a doctor in the Marine regiment of the French Navy in the expeditionary force that was sent to the Balkans to support the Serbian Army against Austrian troops. He was later transferred to a cruiser in the Mediterranean fleet. It was during this time that he won the Croix du Guerre with palm, an award issued to military units whose members performed heroic deeds in combat. He was also awarded the Croix de chevalier (Knight) and the Croix d'officier (Officer) by the Legion of Honour.

== Medical career ==
After serving in the navy, Portmann followed the works of Émile Moure, who was a French doctor and pioneer in the field of otorhinolaryngology. Moure had opened a free educational institution in Bordeaux in 1880 that specialised in the study and treatment of ENT conditions. Portmann was appointed as Moure's successor at the institution, eventually becoming the clinical lead in 1920, an associate professor in 1923, and eventually the ENT Chair at the Faculty of Medicine between 1924 and 1963, as well as the faculty dean between 1949 and 1955.

== Political career ==
Portmann's political career began in the 1930s when he was appointed mayor of Sainte-Eulalie in Gironde and was subsequently elected as a centre-left senator of Gironde in January 1933. This was a position he held for nearly four decades, firstly until December 1941 under the Third Republic, again from June 1955 until April 1959 under the Fourth Republic, and lastly from April 1959 to September 1971 under the Fifth Republic.

In July 1940, he voted full powers to Philippe Pétain. In January 1941, after the dismissal of Pierre Laval, Pierre-Étienne Flandin appointed Portmann as Secretary General for Information in the Vichy government, a position he held until April 1942 when Laval returned to government. He entered the French Resistance in 1942 and hid Jews in his hospital whilst also using his position as mayor to provide falsified ration cards. He was briefly suspended from his teaching post following the French Liberation, although he was soon acquitted by the High Court of Justice.

== Family ==
Following his return to Bordeaux after the First World War, Portmann married Emily Moure, the daughter of Émile-Jules Moure. Their son, Michel Portmann, achieved global recognition as one of the foremost specialists in otorhinolaryngology. He held the position of professor of Medicine at the University of Bordeaux, and as a researcher, notably in the field of electrocochleography. Michel's own son, Didier Portmann, also pursued a career in otorhinolaryngology. He currently serves as director of the Georges-Portmann Institute and editor of the Revue de laryngologie (Laryngology Review).

== Published works ==
Portmann is the author of numerous scientific, medical, and political publications. Some of his notable publications include:

- Le cancer du nez, des fosses nasales, des cavités accessoires, et du naso-pharynx (1927)
- L'Allemagne dans les tranchées de la paix, which warned against the rise of Nazism (1933)
- Considérations cliniques et anatomo-pathologiques sur le cancer du larynx chez le vieillard (1935). This was written by Portmann in collaboration with Mougneau and Barraud.
- Considérations sur la pathologie de la surdité progressive', par le Prof. Georges Portmann (1943)
- Georges Portmann. Son action Parlementaire, Scientifique et Sociale (1955)
- Oto-rhino-laryngologie (1960). This was written by Portmann in collaboration with follow doctors, Jean Despons, Max Berger, and his son, Michel.
- Contacts et pensées : Souvenirs (1982). This was written by Portmann, René Massot, and Anne Portmann.
