= Regional Council of Aquitaine =

Regional Council of Aquitaine: Conseil régional d'Aquitaine (French); Akitaniako Eskualde Kontseilua (Basque); Conselh regional d'Aquitània (Occitan)
- Logo of the Council (as of 2015)

Type
- Type: Unicameral

History
- Disbanded: 2015

Leadership
- President: Alain Rousset, PS since 1998

Structure
- Seats: 85
- Political groups: Radical Party of the Left/ Socialist Party (45); Left Front (3); Europe Ecology – The Greens (10); Union for a Popular Movement (17); Democratic Movement (10)

Elections
- Last election: 2010

Meeting place
- Hôtel de région, Bordeaux

Website
- aquitaine.fr

The Regional Council of Aquitaine was the regional council of the French region of Aquitaine. It included 85 members. It was replaced by the Regional Council of Nouvelle-Aquitaine in 2016.

== Seats ==
=== By Department ===
- 36 councillors for Gironde
- 17 councillors for Pyrénées-Atlantiques
- 12 councillors for Dordogne
- 10 councillors for Lot-et-Garonne
- 10 councillors for Landes

== Elections ==
=== 2004 ===
| Candidate | Party | Votes (Round One) | % (Round One) | Votes (Round Two) | % (Round Two) |
|---|---|---|---|---|---|
| Alain Rousset (incumbent) | PS-PRG-Verts | 516,392 | 38.42% | 769,893 | 54.87% |
| Xavier Darcos | UMP-CNIP | 247,232 | 18.40% | 469,386 | 33.46% |
| Jacques Colombier | FN | 153,859 | 11.45% | 163,731 | 11.67% |
| François Bayrou | UDF | 215,796 | 16.06% | - | - |
| Jean Saint-Josse | CPNT | 96,925 | 7.21% | - | - |
| Annie Guilhamet | PCF-MRC | 58,485 | 4.35% | - | - |
| Martine Mailfert | LCR/LO | 55,215 | 4.11% | - | - |
| Total | | 1,343,904 | 100.00% | 1,403,010 | 100.00% |

== Past Regional Councils ==
=== 1998 ===
| Party | Seats |
|---|---|
| Socialist Party | 28 |
| Union for French Democracy | 15 |
| Rally for the Republic | 13 |
| National Front | 9 |
| Hunting, Fishing, Nature, Traditions | 8 |
| French Communist Party | 8 |
| The Greens | 3 |
| Citizens' Movement | 1 |

=== 1992 ===
| Party | Seats |
|---|---|
| Rally for the Republic-Union for French Democracy | 32 |
| Socialist Party | 20 |
| Hunting, Fishing, Nature, Traditions | 10 |
| National Front | 8 |
| Ecology Generation | 7 |
| French Communist Party | 6 |
| The Greens | 2 |
| Citizens' Movement | 1 |

=== 1986 ===
| Party | Seats |
|---|---|
| Rally for the Republic-Union for French Democracy | 39 |
| Socialist Party | 32 |
| French Communist Party | 8 |
| National Front | 4 |

=== Past Presidents ===
- Jacques Chaban-Delmas (1974–1979)
- André Labarrère (1979–1981)
- Philippe Madrelle (1981–1985)
- Jacques Chaban-Delmas (1985–1988)
- Jean Tavernier (1988–1992)
- Jacques Valade (1992–1998)
- Alain Rousset (1998-)
