= Jean Tavernier =

French politician (1928–2020)

President of the Aquitaine Regional Council
- In office 11 July 1988 – 22 March 1992
- Preceded by: Jacques Chaban-Delmas
- Succeeded by: Jacques Valade

Regional Councillor of Aquitaine
- In office 1986–1992

President of Bordeaux Segalen University
- In office 1979–1989
- Preceded by: Jacques Latrille
- Succeeded by: Dominique Ducassou

Personal details
- Born: 6 March 1928; Algiers, French Algeria
- Died: 28 November 2020 (aged 92); Bordeaux, France
- Education: Lycée Michel-Montaigne
- Occupation: Radiologist

Jean Tavernier (6 March 1928 – 28 November 2020) was a French politician.

== Biography ==
After his studies at the Lycée Montaigne, Tavernier became a radiologist. He served as President of Bordeaux Segalen University from 1979 to 1989 and on the Aquitaine Regional Council starting in 1986. He became President of the council on 11 July 1988 after the resignation of Jacques Chaban-Delmas. He was succeeded by Jacques Valade in 1992.

Jean Tavernier died on 28 November 2020 at the age of 92.

== Distinctions ==
- Officer of the Legion of Honour (1996), awarded by Prime Minister Alain Juppé.
