= Cantons of Bordeaux =

Coordinates: 44.84°N 0.57°W

The cantons of Bordeaux are administrative divisions of the Gironde department, in southwestern France. Since the French canton reorganisation which came into effect in March 2015, the city of Bordeaux is subdivided into 5 cantons. Their seat is in Bordeaux.

== Cantons ==
Name	Population (2019)	Cantonal Code
Canton of Bordeaux-1	46,284	3302
Canton of Bordeaux-2	50,058	3303
Canton of Bordeaux-3	48,342	3304
Canton of Bordeaux-4	63,268	3305
Canton of Bordeaux-5	53,006	3306
