= Gironde =

Department of France

Gironde Gironda (Occitan)
- Department of France
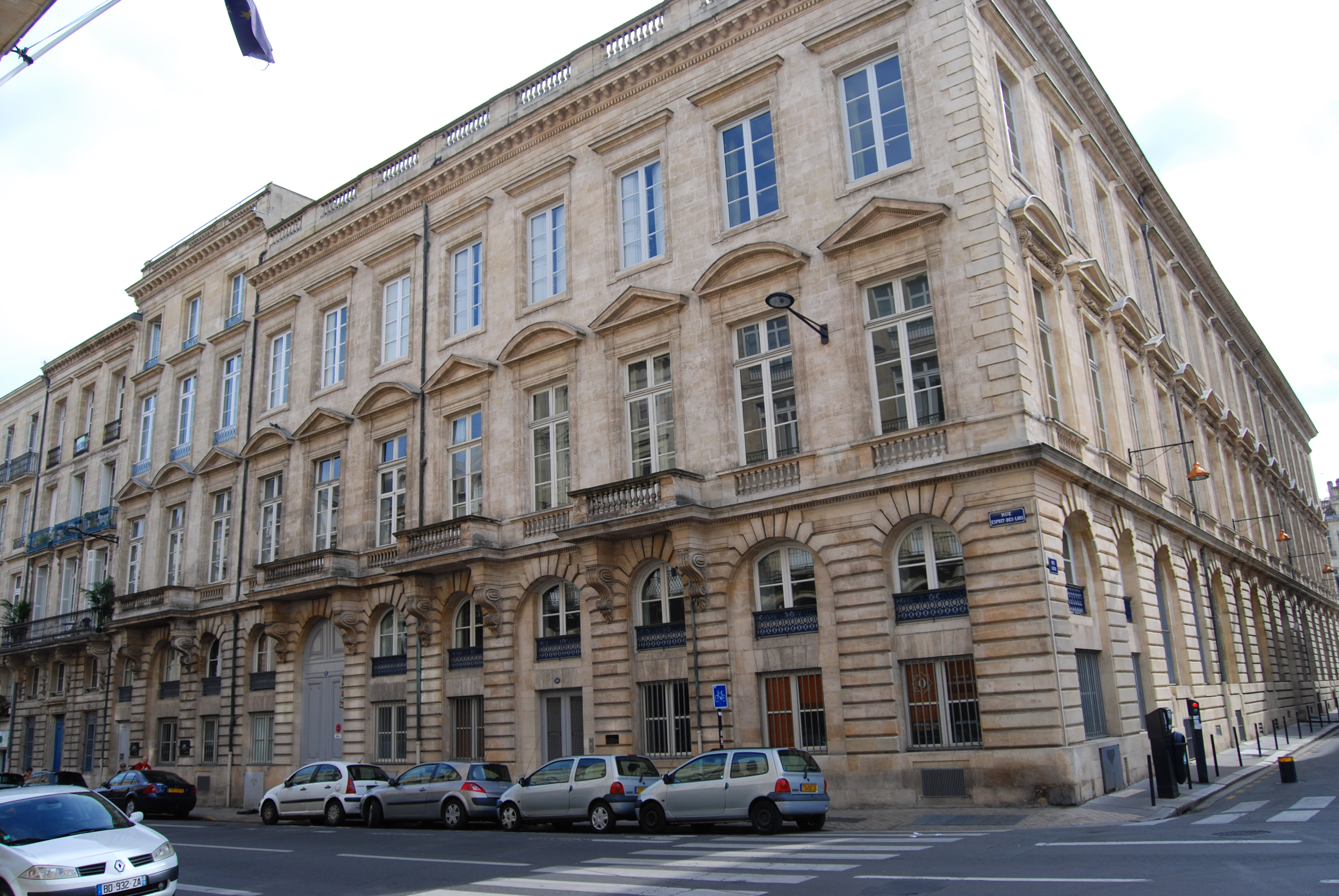
- Prefecture building in Bordeaux

- Flag Coat of arms

- Location of Gironde in France
- Coordinates: 44°50′N 0°40′W
- Country: France
- Region: Nouvelle-Aquitaine
- Prefecture: Bordeaux
- Subprefectures: Arcachon; Blaye; Langon; Lesparre-Médoc; Libourne

Government
  - President of the Departmental Council: Jean-Luc Gleyze (PS)

Area^{1}
  - Total: 10,725 km^{2} (4,141 sq mi)

Population (2023)
  - Total: 1,690,493
  - Rank: 6th
  - Density: 157.62/km^{2} (408.24/sq mi)
- Time zone: UTC+1 (CET)
  - Summer (DST): UTC+2 (CEST)
- ISO 3166 code: FR-33
- Department number: 33
- Arrondissements: 6
- Cantons: 33
- Communes: 534
- ^1 French Land Register data, which excludes estuaries and lakes, ponds and glaciers larger than 1 km^{2}.

Gironde (/ʒɪˈrɒnd/ zhih-ROND, US usually /dʒɪˈ-/ jih-; French: [ʒiʁɔ̃d]; Occitan: Gironda, pronounced [dʒiˈɾundɔ]) is the largest department in the southwestern French region of Nouvelle-Aquitaine. Named after the Gironde estuary, a major waterway, its prefecture is Bordeaux. In 2023, it had a population of 1,690,493. The famous Bordeaux wine region is in Gironde. It has six arrondissements, making it one of the departments with the most arrondissements (Nord also has six, while Pas-de-Calais has the most of any department, with seven).

== History ==
Gironde is one of the original 83 departments created during the French Revolution on 4 March 1790. It was created from parts of the former provinces of Guyenne and Gascony.

From 1793 to 1795, the department's name was changed to Bec-d'Ambès to avoid the association with the Girondist political party of the French Revolution.

In July 2022 and July 2026, Gironde was affected by large wildfires.

== Geography ==
Gironde is part of the current region of Nouvelle-Aquitaine and is surrounded by the departments of Landes, Lot-et-Garonne, Dordogne and Charente-Maritime and the Atlantic Ocean on the west. With an area of 10,000 km^{2}, Gironde is the largest department in metropolitan France, and the second-largest in entire France. Its size is larger than Lebanon or the province of Banten. If overseas departments are included, however, Gironde's land area is dwarfed by the 83,846 km^{2} of French Guiana.

Gironde is well known for the Côte d'Argent beach which is Europe's longest, attracting many surfers to Lacanau each year. It is also the birthplace of Jacques-Yves Cousteau who studied the sea and all forms of life in water.

The Great Dune of Pyla in Arcachon Bay near Bordeaux is the tallest sand dune in Europe.

== Demographics ==
Historical population

Year	Pop.	±% p.a.
1801	502,723	—
1806	522,371	+0.77%
1821	522,041	−0.00%
1831	554,225	+0.60%
1841	568,034	+0.25%
1851	614,387	+0.79%
1861	667,193	+0.83%
1872	705,149	+0.50%
1881	748,703	+0.67%
1891	793,528	+0.58%
1901	821,131	+0.34%
1911	829,095	+0.10%
1921	819,128	−0.12%
1931	852,768	+0.40%

Year	Pop.	±% p.a.
1936	850,567	−0.05%
1946	858,381	+0.09%
1954	896,517	+0.54%
1962	935,448	+0.53%
1968	1,009,390	+1.28%
1975	1,061,480	+0.72%
1982	1,127,546	+0.87%
1990	1,213,499	+0.92%
1999	1,287,334	+0.66%
2007	1,409,345	+1.14%
2012	1,483,712	+1.03%
2017	1,583,384	+1.31%
2023	1,690,493	+1.10%

=== Principal towns ===
The most populous commune is Bordeaux, the prefecture. As of 2023, there are 7 communes with more than 30,000 inhabitants, all of which are part of the Bordeaux agglomeration:

Commune	Population (2023)
Bordeaux	267,991
Mérignac	78,090
Pessac	67,339
Talence	46,338
Villenave-d'Ornon	42,545
Saint-Médard-en-Jalles	32,910
Bègles	31,831

== Politics ==
The President of the Departmental Council is Jean-Luc Gleyze of the Socialist Party.

Party		seats
•	Socialist Party	45
	The Republicans	12
•	French Communist Party	3
	Miscellaneous Right	1
	MoDem	1
	Hunting, Fishing, Nature, Tradition	1

=== Current National Assembly Representatives ===
Constituency	Member	Party
Gironde's 1st constituency	Alexandra Martin	Renaissance
Gironde's 2nd constituency	Nicolas Thierry	The Ecologists
Gironde's 3rd constituency	Loïc Prud'homme	La France Insoumise
Gironde's 4th constituency	Alain David	Socialist Party
Gironde's 5th constituency	Pascale Got	Socialist Party
Gironde's 6th constituency	Marie Recalde	Socialist Party
Gironde's 7th constituency	Sébastien Saint-Pasteur	Socialist Party
Gironde's 8th constituency	Sophie Panonacle	Renaissance
Gironde's 9th constituency	Sophie Mette	MoDem
Gironde's 10th constituency	Florent Boudié	Renaissance
Gironde's 11th constituency	Edwige Diaz	National Rally
Gironde's 12th constituency	Mathilde Feld	La France Insoumise

== Tourism ==
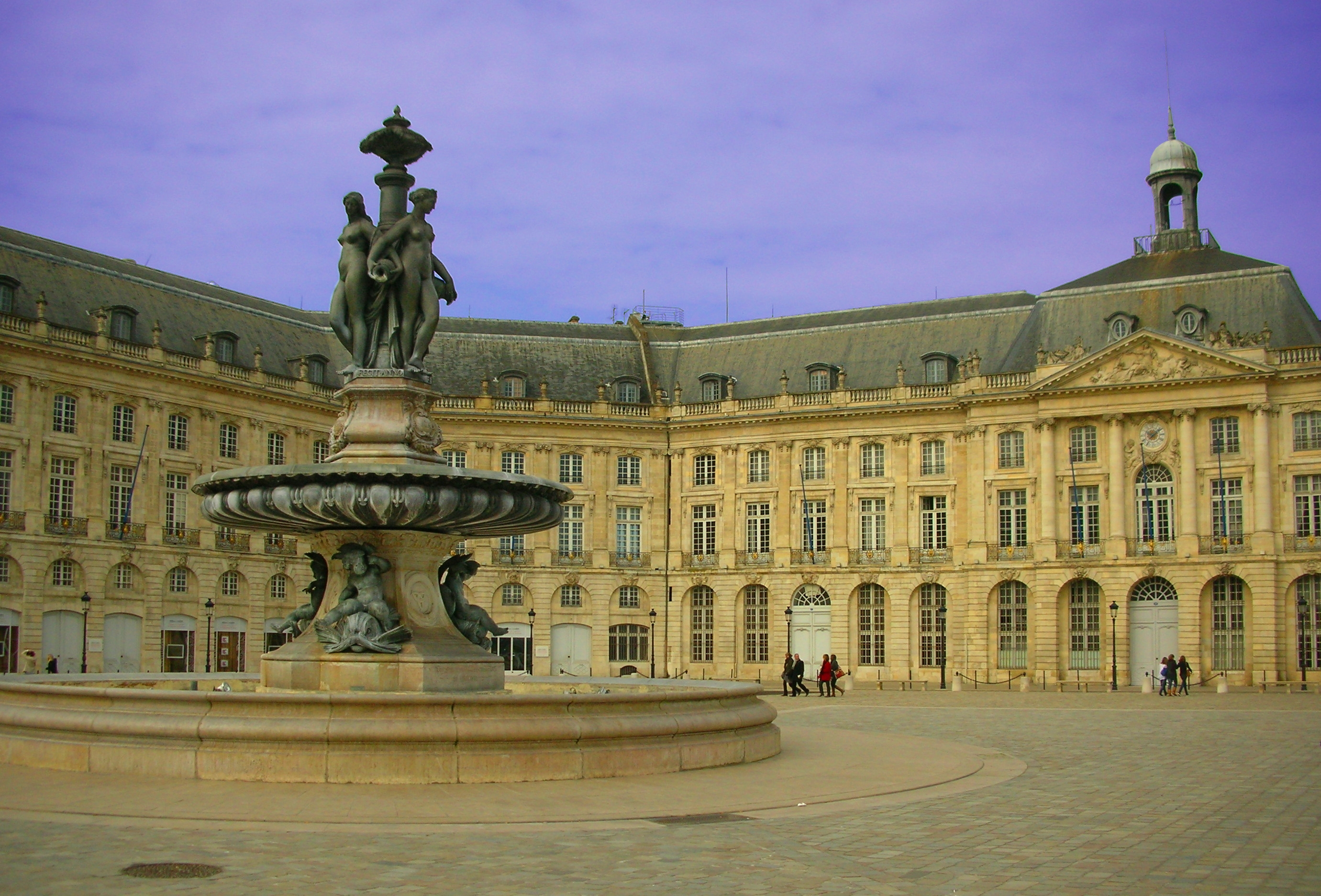
Bordeaux

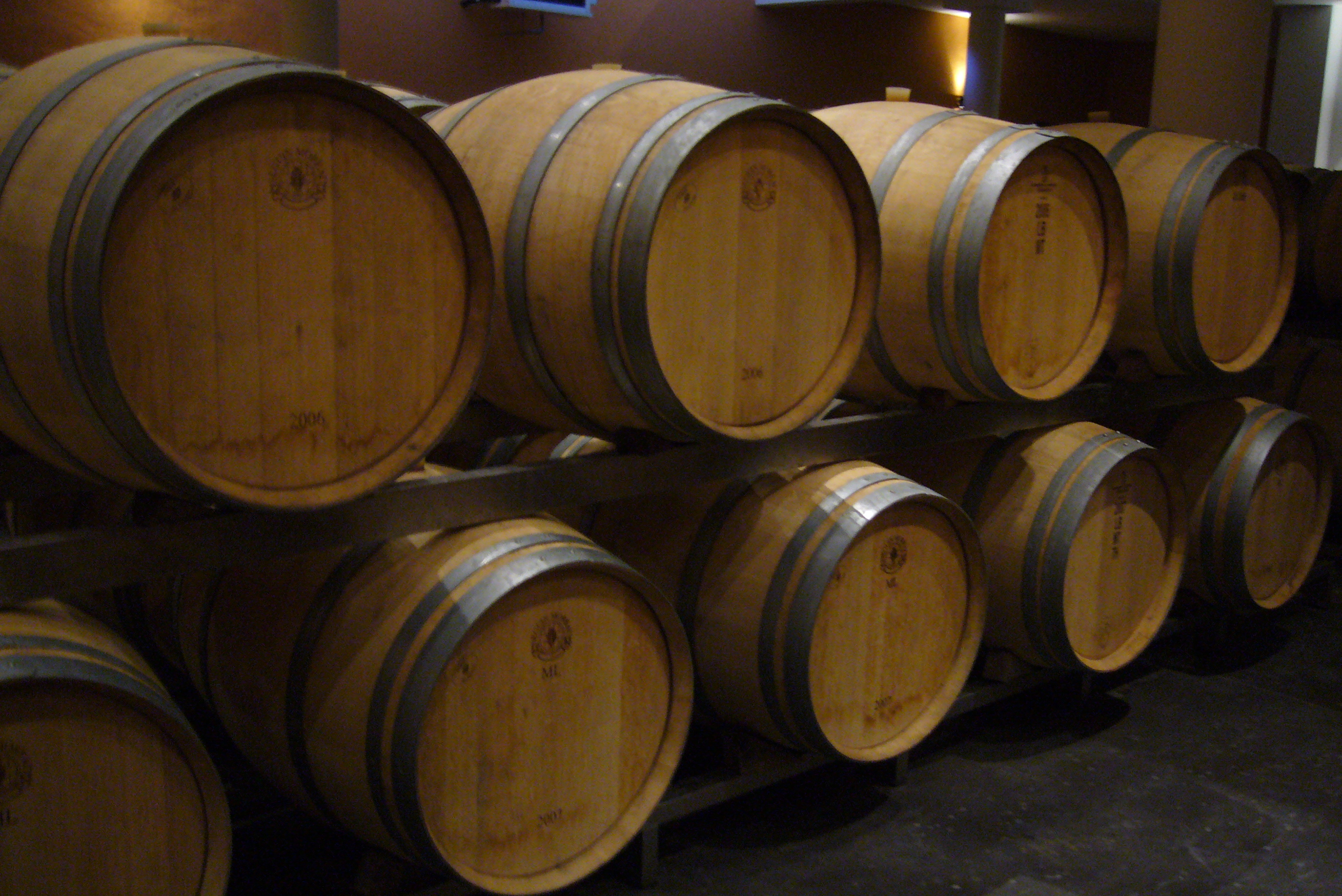
Bordeaux wine

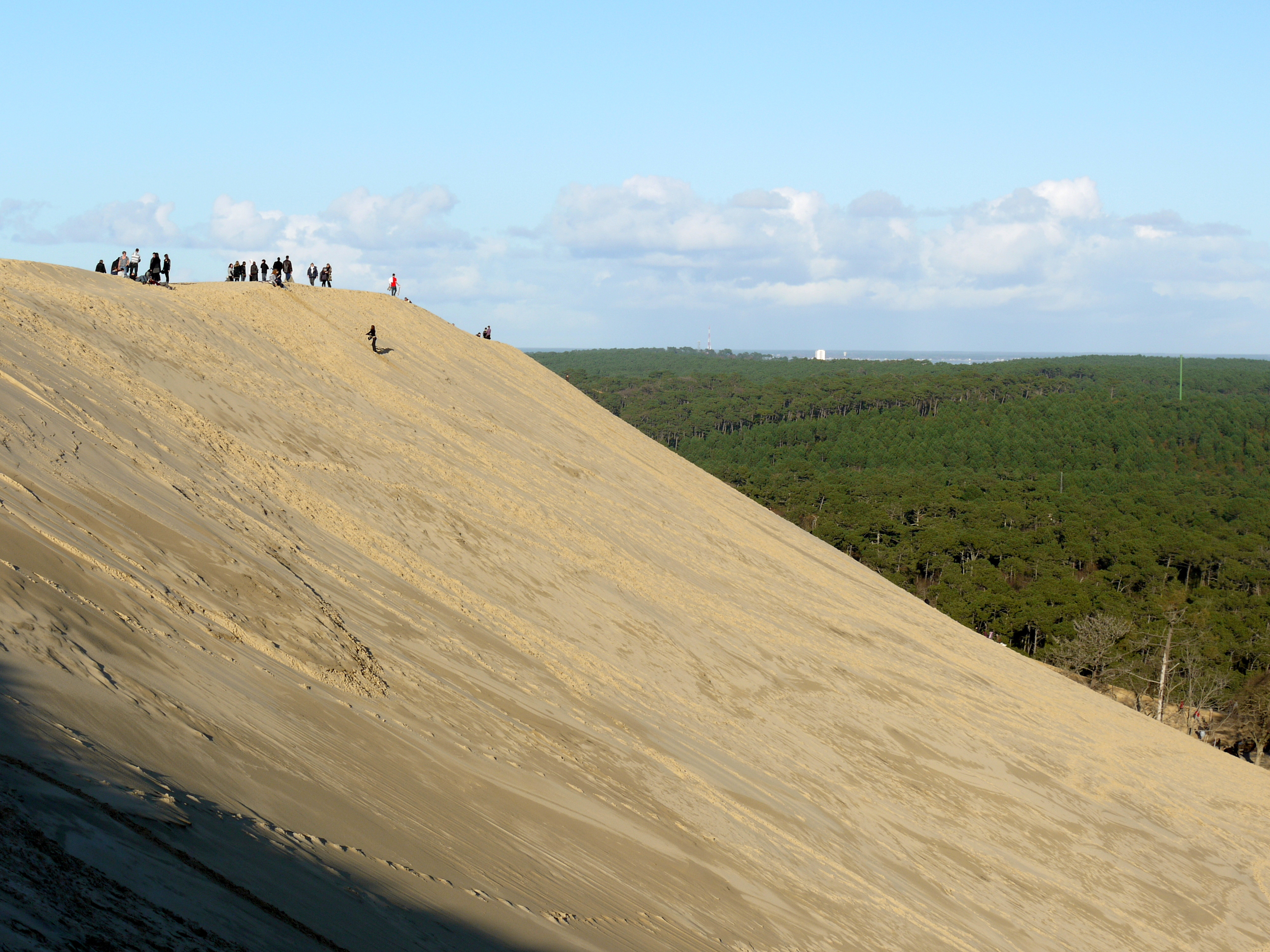
The Great Dune of Pyla

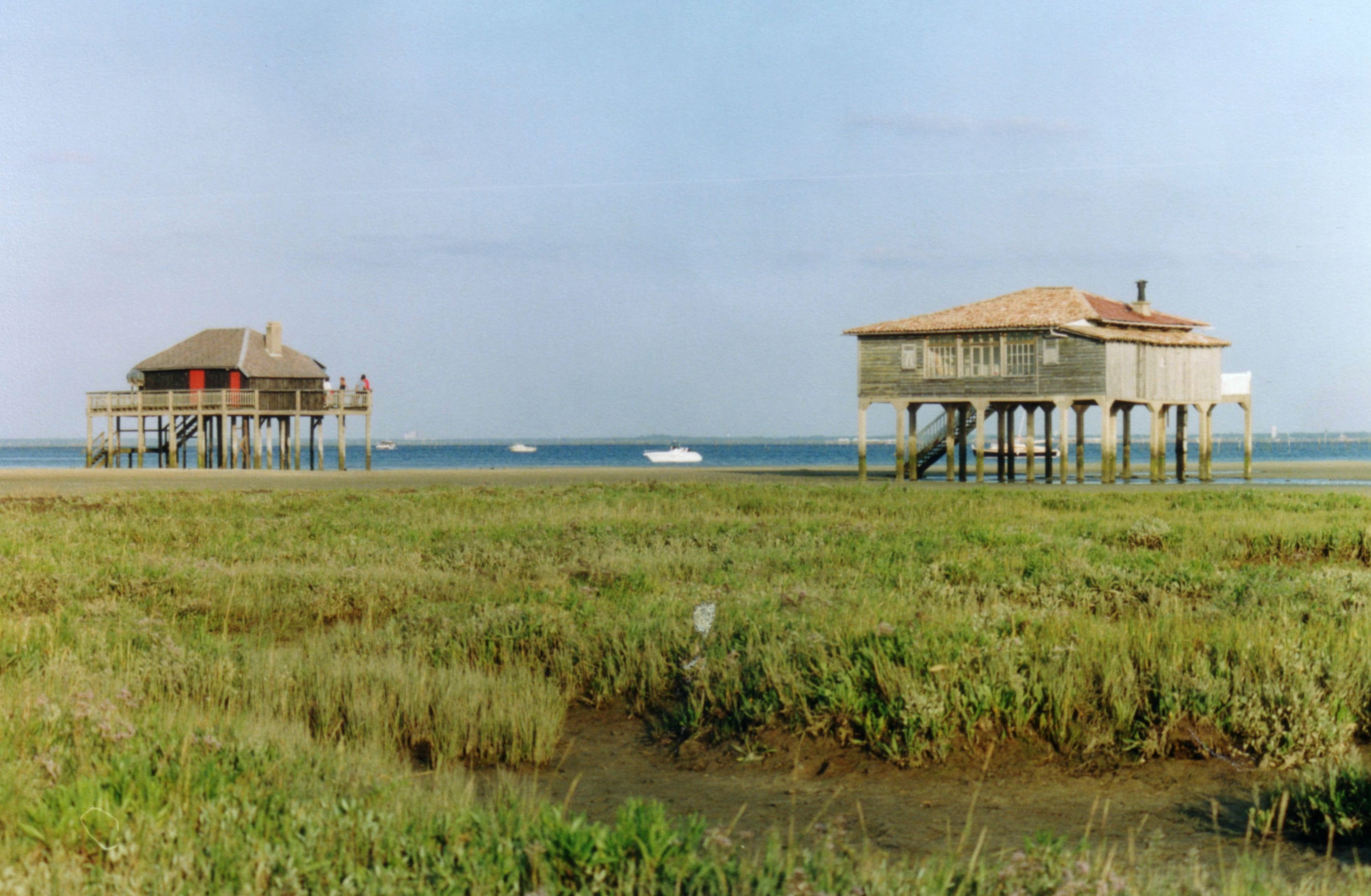
Arcachon Bay

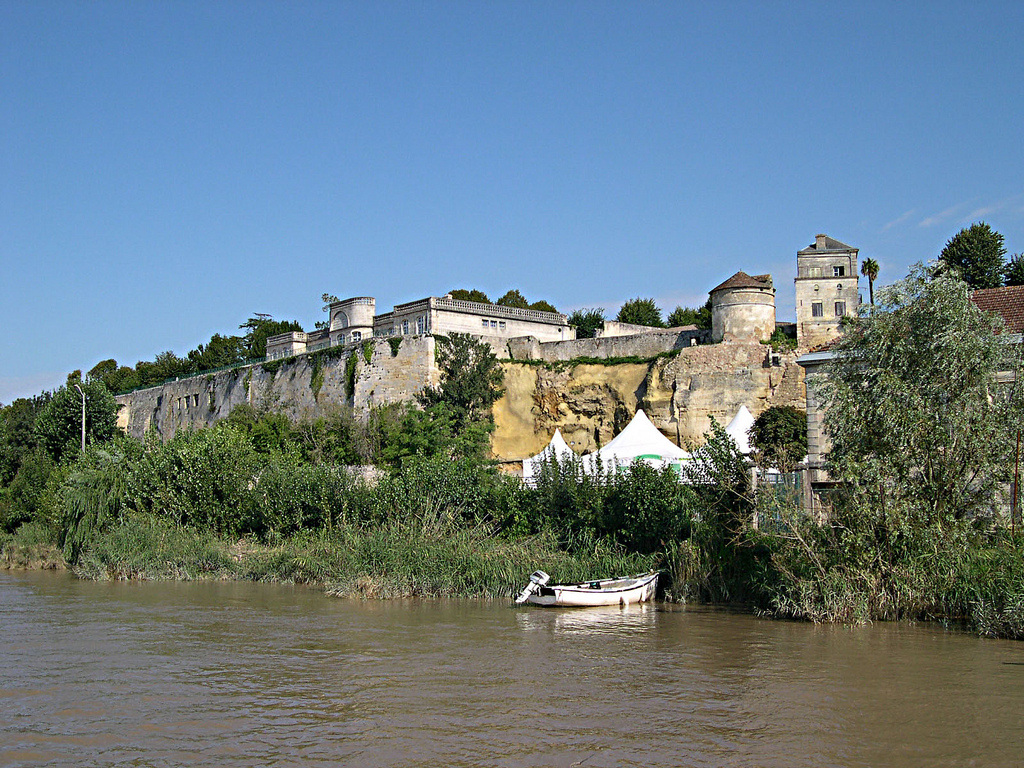
Bourg-sur-Gironde

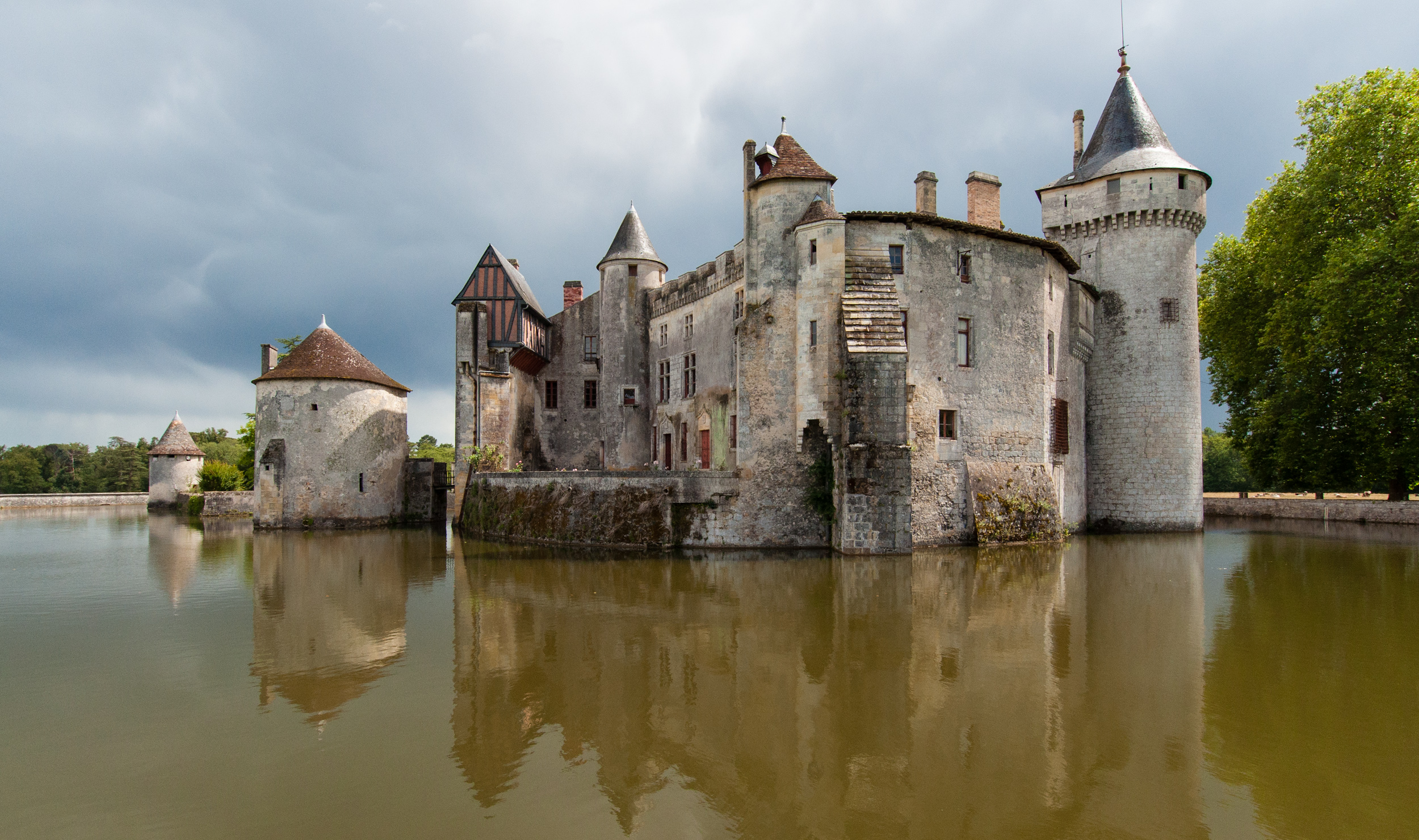
Château de la Brède, birthplace of Montesquieu

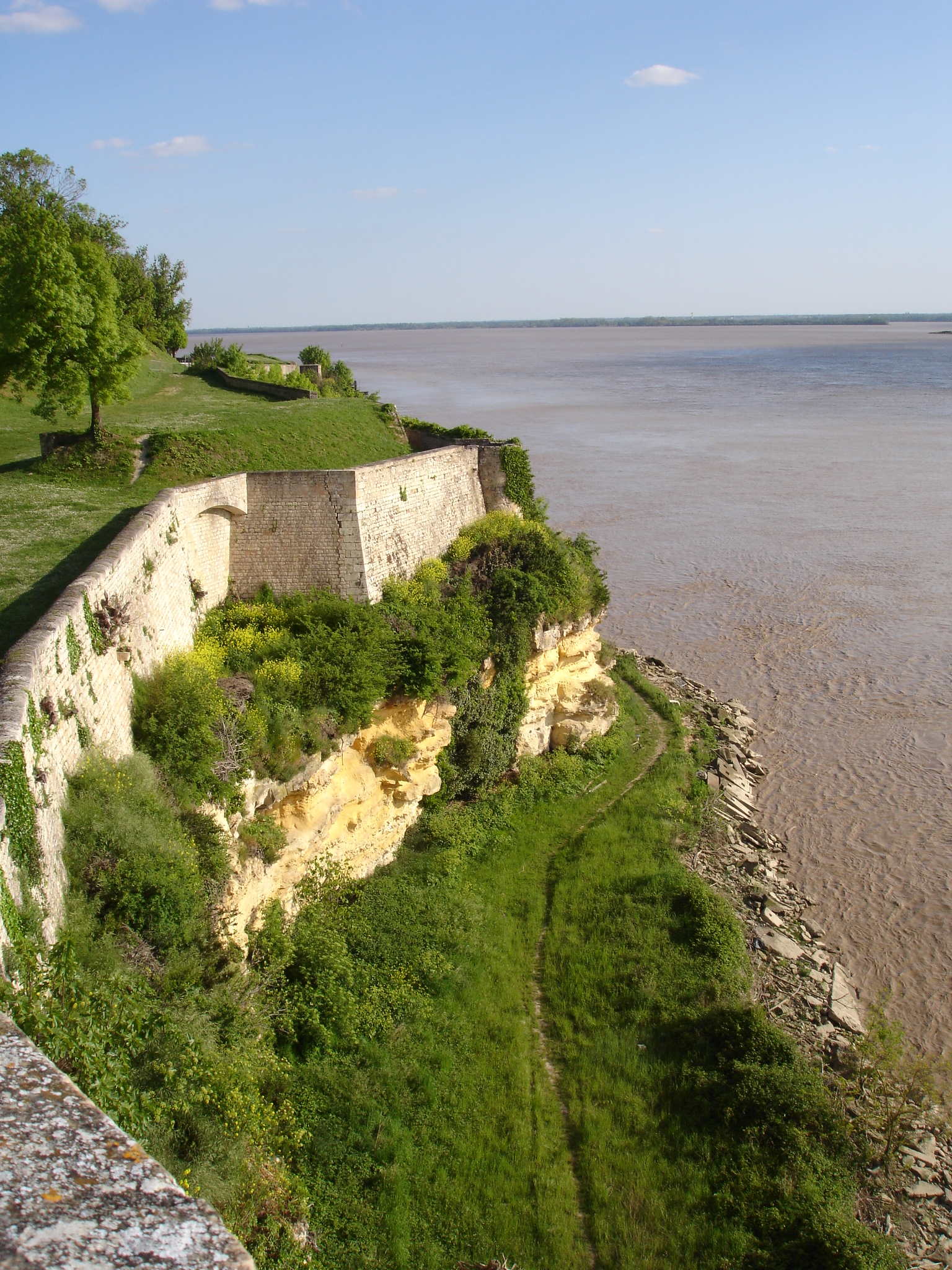
The Gironde estuary seen from the citadel of Blaye

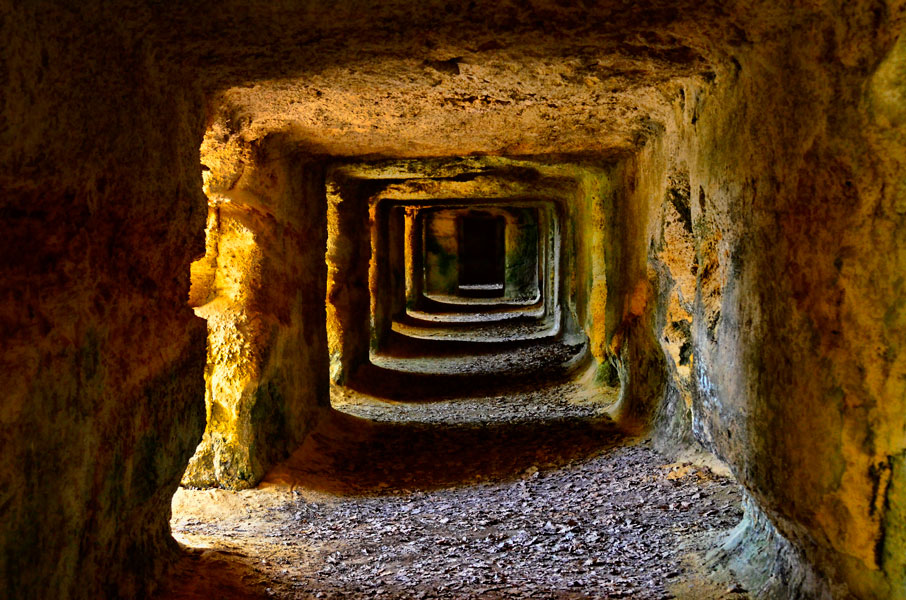
Grottoes of Ferrand

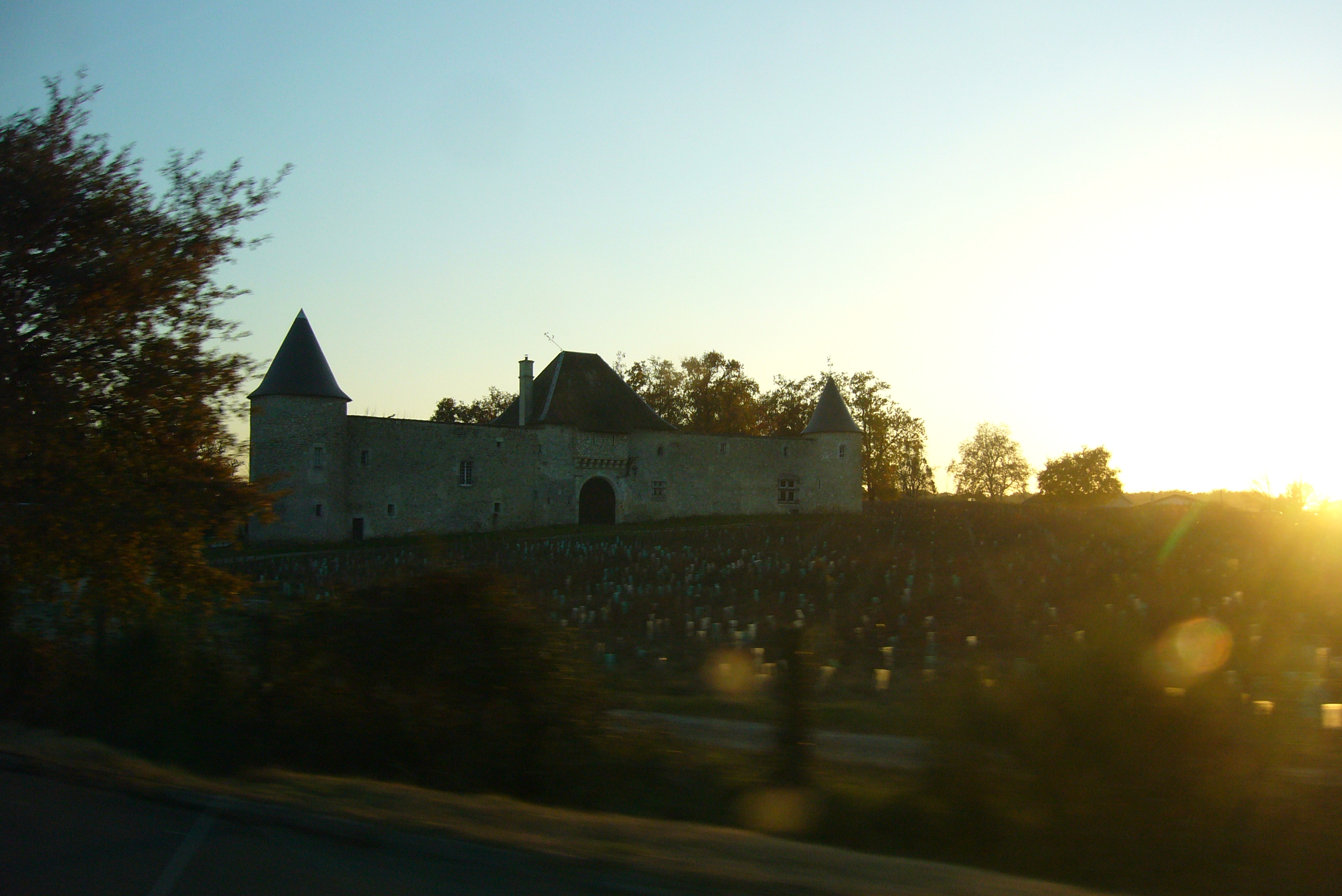
Château d'Eck
- The Medieval Construction Site of Guyenne (Chantier Médiéval de Guyenne), is an experimental archaeology project aiming at erecting an 11^{th} century chapel, a romanesque cloister and a gothic building.

== See also ==
- Cantons of the Gironde department
- Communes of the Gironde department
- Arrondissements of the Gironde department
- Bordeaux wine regions
