= Château Bel Air (Le Haillan) =

Château in Nouvelle-Aquitaine, France

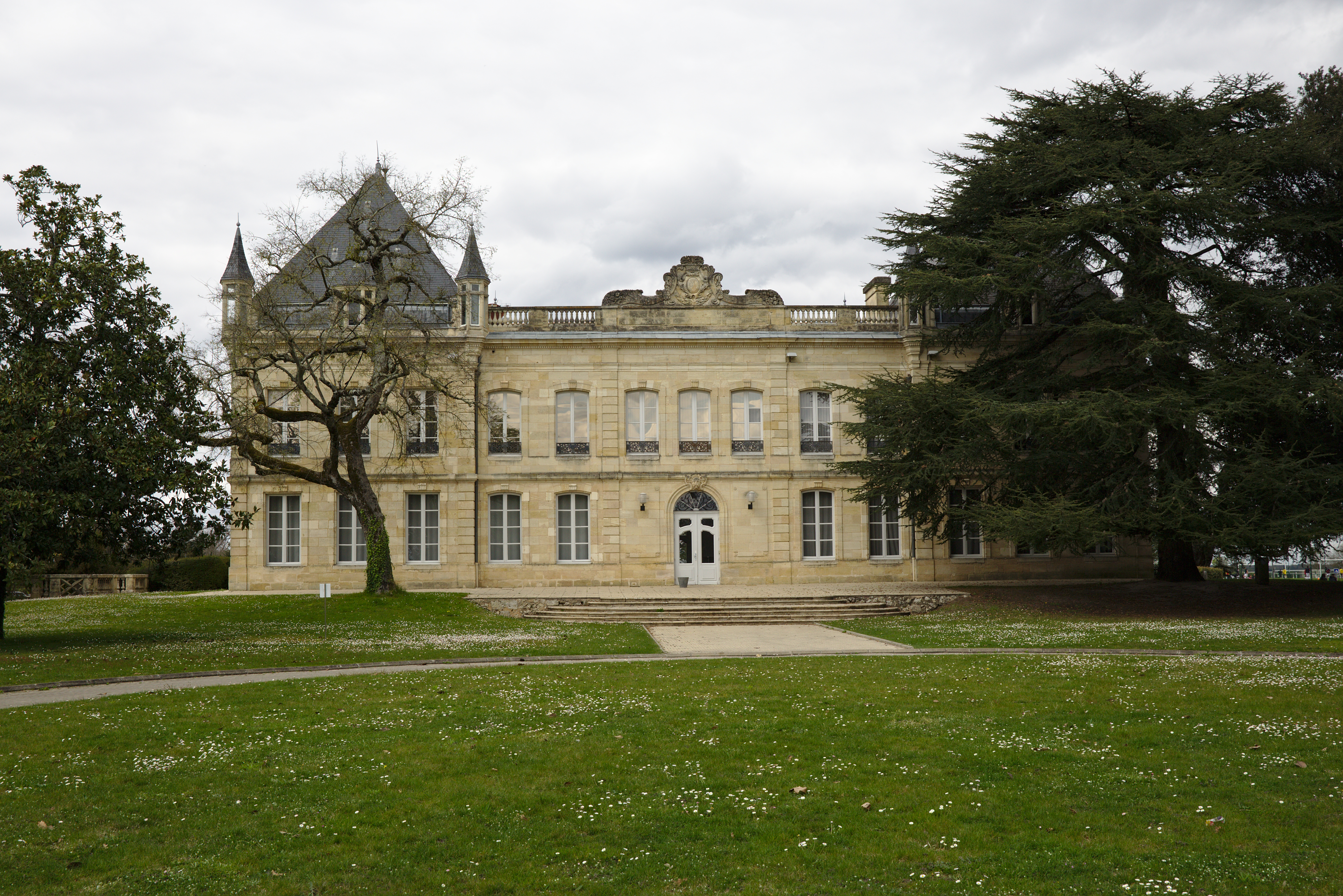
- View from the south

- Location within France
- Alternative names: Château du Haillan

General information
- Type: Château
- Location: Le Haillan, Aquitaine, France, France
- Coordinates: 44.874475°N 0.670901°W

Technical details
- Material: Stone
- Floor count: 2

Design and construction
- Designations: (see Designated landmark)

Château Bel Air, also called the Château du Haillan, is a château in Le Haillan in the outskirts of Bordeaux, Aquitaine, France. The 1820 building is the administrative headquarters of the FC Girondins de Bordeaux, a football club.

== Structure ==
The two-storey château has elements from the 18th century, and was transformed around 1845. It is faced with rough and dressed stone. The roof includes both slate and tile. The façade is decorated with sculptures and a coat of arms.

== History ==
In the Middle Ages the site was called the Bourdieu de Lanneblanque and was the property of the noble house of Bussac. It was the location of the Battle of Haillan during the Hundred Years' War (1337–1453) when the city of Bordeaux, incited by the archbishop Pey Berland, refused to open the gates to the troops of Charles VII of France. The mayor launched an attack on the king's forces in which the city's army was massacred. 1 November 1450 is a day remembered as La Male Journade ("the bad day") in Bordelais history.

Pierre Lafargue Jeune built the château in 1820. The domain changed hands several times after this. In 1845 the new owner of Lanneblanque, Francisco Antonio de Los Heros, changed the name of the property to Château de Bel Air. A 1908 print of the château has the caption "Chateau Bel-Air (Cru Bourgeois); Mme Vve Joseph Prom, propriétaire", referring to the use of the domain as a vineyard. During World War II the château was occupied by the Germans and used as a munitions depot. On 23 August 1944, the woods of the property were torn apart by an explosion of the German munitions stored on the domain. The property was looted after the Germans left.

A meadow was converted to a football pitch in 1951, and in 1956 further sports fields were created and the château cellars became locker rooms. In 1963, the farmland on the site became uneconomical due to shortage of farm labourers and was sold to the city, which created huge sports fields, a school of horticulture and the Bordeaux greenhouse gardens. In 1986, the municipal council agreed to build an international football centre managed by the Girondins de Bordeaux, who moved there from the Rocquevielle grounds in Mérignac.

== Today ==
Today the château is the administrative headquarters of the Girondins de Bordeaux. It is surrounded by the club's 11 hectares (27 acres) International Center, which has nine football pitches, two synthetic football pitches, a 3 kilometres (1.9 mi) jogging path through the woods, a training centre, football school, and the Girondins TV studios. The basement holds offices, the restaurant kitchen and the shop. The ground floor holds the restaurant, reception rooms and bar. The floors above hold additional offices, security and computers.

The professional centre, a light building with glass walls, is situated in the centre of the practice fields. There is 850 square metres (9,100 sq ft) of floor space with one dressing room and 30 lockers, a shower, a physiotherapy room, weight room, and a 30-seat video room.

== Sources ==
- "Demeure dite Château Bel Air", Mérimée (in French), Ministère de la Culture et de la Communication
- "Du Château Bel Air au Château du Haillan", Scapulaire (in French), archived from the original on 2016-06-05
- "Le château du Haillan", ActuGirondins.com (in French)
- Le château du Haillan (in French), FC Girondins de Bordeaux, archived from the original on 2016-05-02
- "Le Haillan", Girondins4ever (in French)
- "MÉDOC. LE HAILLAN. Chateau Bel-Air (Cru Bourgeois). Prom. Bordeaux. SMALL, 1908", Antiqua Print Gallery
- Guy Dupuis (2008), Lescure: Stade Municipal de Bordeaux, Aujourd'hui stade Chaban-Delmas (in French), Les Dossiers d'Aquitaine, pp. 63–, ISBN 978-2-84622-160-3
