= Raymond Subes =

French decorative artist (1891–1970)

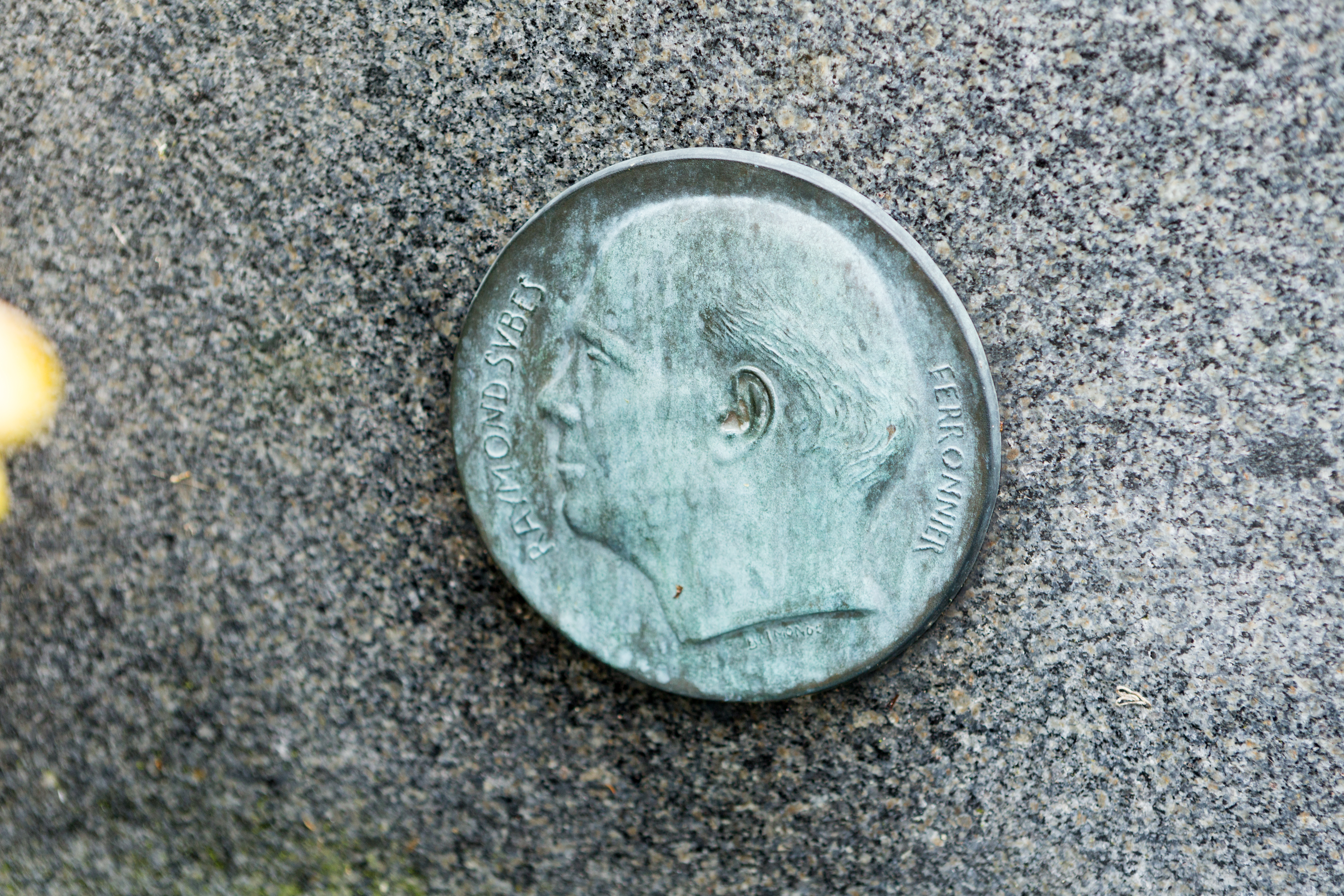
Portrait of Raymond Subes on his family tomb at the Père Lachaise Cemetery, Paris

Raymond Henri Subes (13 April 1891 – 31 January 1970) was a French decorative artist specializing in ironwork. Generally associated with the Art Deco movement, he has been referred to as one of the greatest French ironworkers of the 20th century.

== Life ==
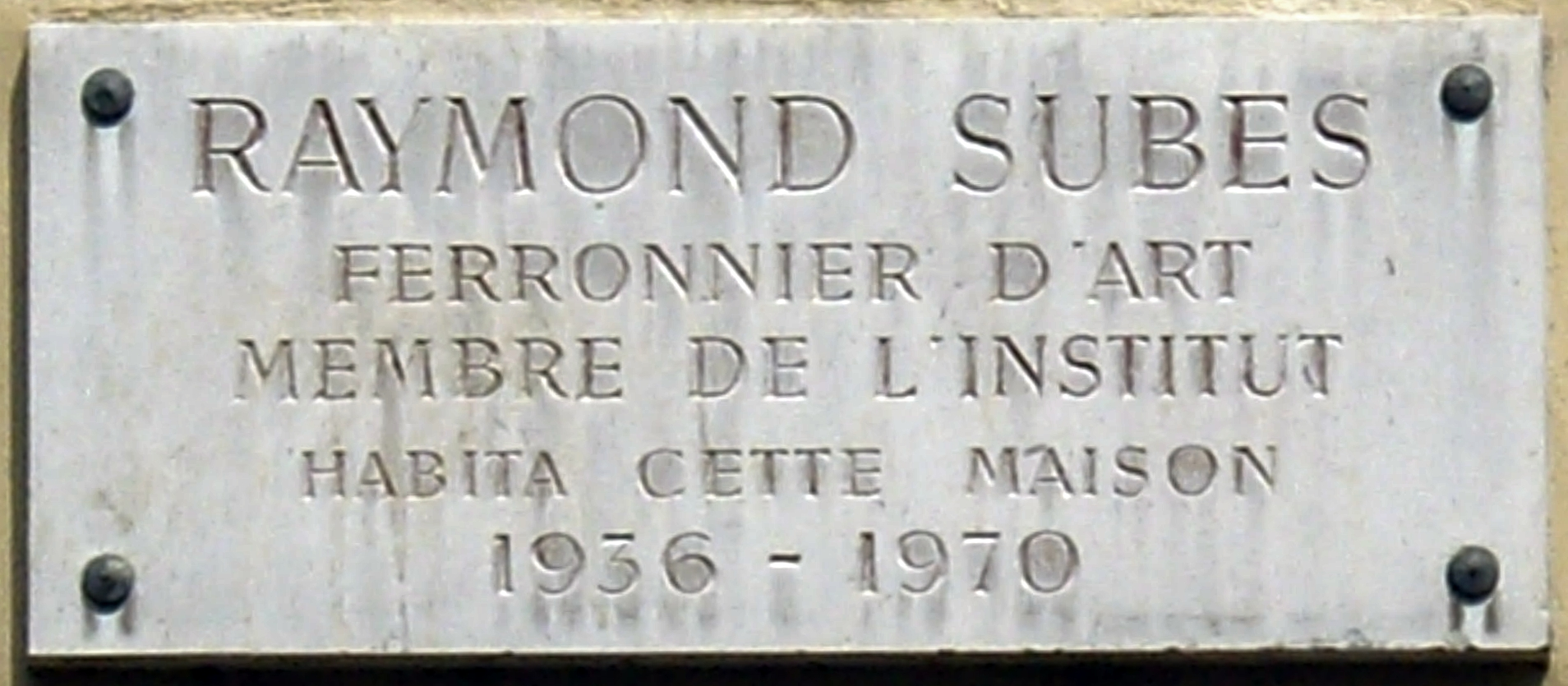
Plaque at Subes's former Parisian home from 1936 to his death, 22 rue Las Cases

Raymond Subes was born 1891 in Paris of Jacques Subes (1857–1929) and his wife Marie, née Bouiges (1859–1936). He studied at École Boulle from 1906 to 1910, graduating top of his class, then briefly at École nationale supérieure des arts décoratifs under architect Charles Genuys. In 1911 he became a draughtsman for Émile Robert, a pioneer of the revival of artisanal ironworking after decades of dominance of industrial cast iron products, who had just cofounded the Borderel & Robert company in Paris together with industrialist Ernest Borderel.

During World War I, Subes served in light infantry, was wounded on 24 August 1914 at Audun-le-Roman, and was awarded the Croix de Guerre and Médaille militaire for having rescued his wounded captain. He was wounded again and demobilized in 1916.

From then, Subes worked in a workshop that Émile Robert had established in Enghien-les-Bains near Paris, where he acquired his metalworking skills. He married Adrienne Valadié (1895–1963). They had three children, André (1921–1985), Jacques (1924–2002), and Anne-Marie (who married visual artist Yves Millecamps).

In 1919 Subes replaced Émile Robert as artistic director of Borderel & Robert, and rose to chief executive (French: administrateur délégué) after Robert's death in 1924. He also took a professorship at the École Boulle.

In 1924, he purchased the Château de Larnagol in southern France, which he kept as a holiday home for the rest of his life. By the 1950s, he also had a weekend home near Orléans.

In the 1960s, Raymond Subes moved the production facilities of Borderel & Robert from their Parisian location at rue Damrémont to Saint-Denis. He remained at the company's helm until his death on 31 January 1970 in Étampes, following a car accident two days earlier. He was buried in his family's tomb at the Père Lachaise Cemetery where he joined his parents, stepparents and wife.

== Work ==
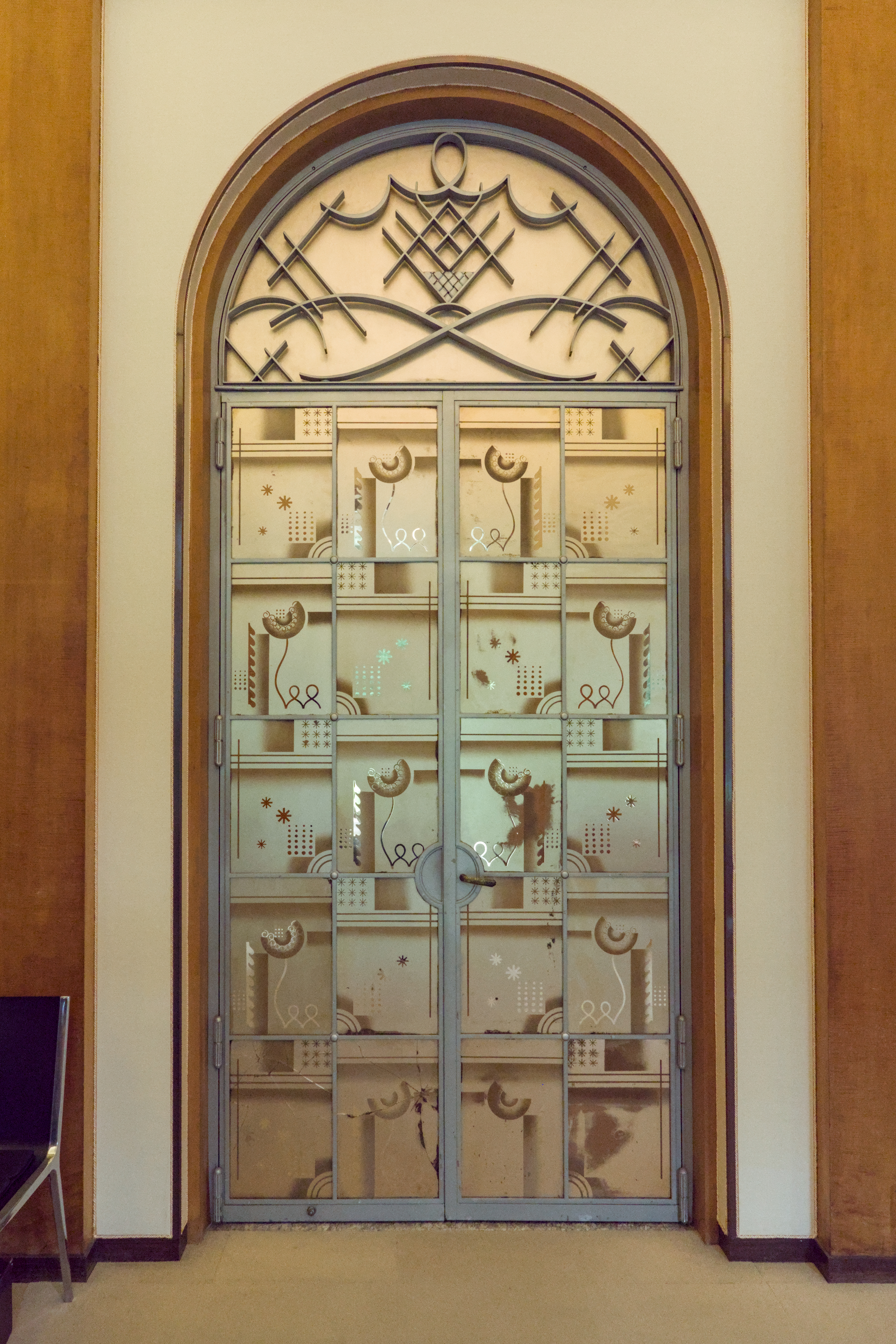
Metalwork created by Subes in the early 1930s (top) above lacquered doors by Max Ingrand at the Tokyo residence of Prince Yasuhiko Asaka, lately Teien Art Museum

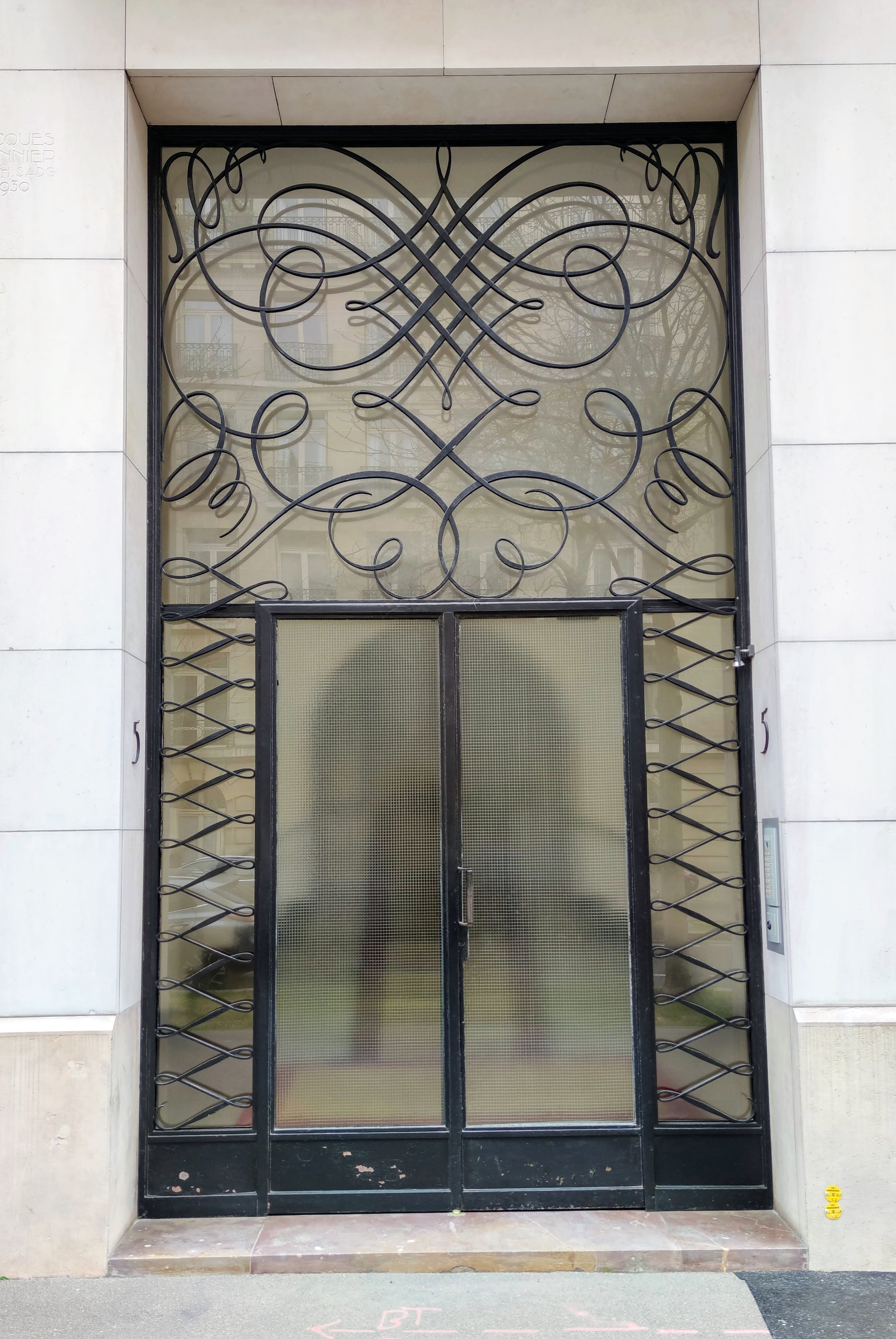
Metalwork created by Subes for a building at 5, avenue Emile-Acollas in Paris

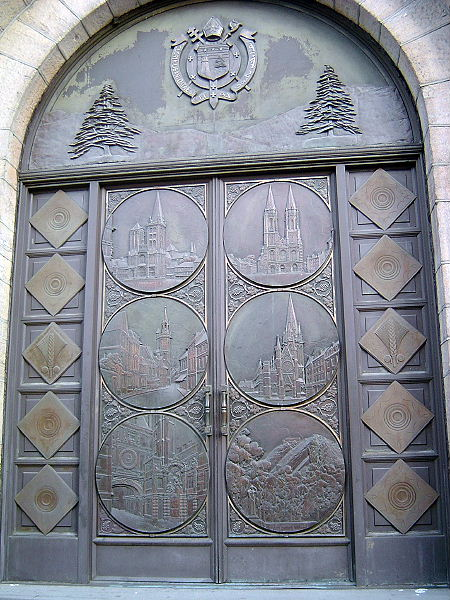
Six medallions created by Subes in 1935 for the SS Normandie, repurposed in 1946 at Our Lady of Lebanon Maronite Cathedral (Brooklyn)

Subes left most of his creations unsigned, but became highly recognized for his unique and elegant design style, often inspired by calligraphy. He worked primarily with wrought iron but also bronze, copper, and starting in the 1930s also aluminum, weathering steel and galvanized steel.

He worked together with some of the greatest architects and decorators of his time such as Jean Dunand, Jules Leleu, Jean Mayodon, and Michel Roux-Spitz. He produced works for the International Exhibition of Modern Decorative and Industrial Arts in 1925, jointly with Émile-Jacques Ruhlmann. For the International Exhibition of 1937, he designed the monumental sliding door of the pavillon du métal, which like most pavilions was demolished after the end of the exhibition. Industrialist Marcel Bloch, founder of Dassault Aviation, purchased the door and had it cut into two unequal pieces: the larger one now adorns Dassault Aviation's head office in Saint-Cloud, on the site where Bloch established a propeller plant in 1938, and the smaller piece is at the Dassault plant in Mérignac, Gironde.

Subes made designs for a wide variety of commissions:

- luxury ocean liners, such as the SS Île de France (1926), SS L'Atlantique (1931), SS Normandie (1935), SS Liberté (1950), and SS France (1962)
- churches including Saint-Louis de Vincennes and Arras Cathedral (1920s), Sacré-Cœur in Paris (early 1920s), Saint-Louis de Villemomble (1926), Sainte-Thérèse-de-l'Enfant-Jésus in Élisabethville (1927–1928), Saint-Léon de Paris (1930), Casablanca Cathedral (1930), Saint-Pierre de Roye (early 1930s), Saint-Jean-Bosco in Paris (mid-1930s), Chapelle Sainte-Bernadette de Paris (1937), Saint-Germain-des-Prés (1948), Rouen Cathedral (1950s)
- cultural and educational organizations, such as the École Nationale des Chartes (1929), the Institut d'Art et d'Archéologie (ca. 1930), the Palais de la Porte Dorée (1931), and the Musée de l'Orangerie (early 1960s),
- government buildings, such as the Ministry of Merchant Marine (1931), the Mairie du 5e arrondissement de Paris, or the Puteaux City Hall
- commercial buildings, including those of the Banque Nationale de Crédit (now head office of BNP Paribas) and National City Bank of New York as well as Paris-soir (1934) in Paris and L'Illustration in Bobigny

One of his notable creations in the public space were innovative telescopic lampposts he designed in 1939 for the Pont du Carrousel in Paris, allowing for both minimal visual footprint during the day and optimal lighting at night. Following the battle of France, Subes feared that the occupying German forces would loot the lampposts' copper and had them hidden in the passageway beneath the bridge, where they remained through World War II. In 1946 they were eventually installed as originally planned, but the telescopic mechanism ceased functioning in the early 1950s. It was repaired in 1999 but stopped again after a few years of operations.

Subes received many official commissions from the French state and prominent French public institutions. He worked with the Manufacture nationale de Sèvres, including on the service donated by the French Republic for the wedding of Princess Elizabeth of England in 1947. In 1953, he redesigned the grand collar of the Legion of Honour. In 1955, he went on to design the medals for the newly revamped Ordre des Palmes académiques, and in 1957, for the newly established Ordre des Arts et des Lettres. Subes's design for the latter has been referred to as the "most beautiful jewel" among French honorific orders. Subes also designed forty ceremonial swords for members of the Institut de France throughout the years; a retrospective exhibition of these was held in May–June 1972 at the Monnaie de Paris.

Subes remained active until his death. In 1962, together with architect Albert Laprade, he created the new tomb of Hubert Lyautey at Les Invalides after Lyautey's remains had been repatriated from his mausoleum on the grounds of the French Protectorate Residence in Rabat. In 1968, he won the design for the memorial to Marshal Leclerc at the Porte d'Orléans in Paris, which was however criticized for outdated design. Subes's outsized torches that framed the monument were demolished in the 1990s, while Leclerc's statue by Raymond Martin was repurposed in the memorial as reconstructed in 1997 on a design by architect Sylvain Dubuisson.

== Awards and honors ==
In addition to his military honors from World War I, Raymond Subes was granted the Legion of Honour as knight (1926), officer (1938), and commander (decree of 22 October 1952). He also rose to the rank of commander in both the Ordre des Palmes académiques and the Ordre des Arts et des Lettres, for both of which he had made medal designs.

In 1958, Subes was the first decorative artist ever elected a member of the Académie des Beaux-Arts.

In August 2010, a square bearing Raymond Subes's name was inaugurated in Larnagol, where he had owned and refurbished the local castle.

== See also ==
- Edgar Brandt
- List of Académie des Beaux-Arts members: Unattached
