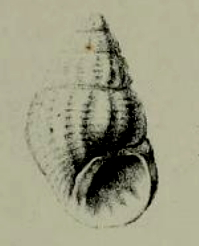
- Shell of Alvania curta (holotype)

Scientific classification
- Kingdom: Animalia
- Phylum: Mollusca
- Class: Gastropoda
- Subclass: Caenogastropoda
- Order: Littorinimorpha
- Superfamily: Rissooidea
- Family: Rissoidae
- Genus: Alvania
- Species: †A. curta

Binomial name
- †Alvania curta (Dujardin, 1837)

Synonyms
- † Alvania (Arsenia) curta (Dujardin, 1837); † Alvania curta nieheimensis Hinsch, 1972 (within the variability of the nominate); † Rissoa curta Dujardin, 1837 (Alvania accepted as full genus)

= Alvania curta =

Species of gastropod

Alvania curta is an extinct species of minute sea snail, a marine gastropod mollusc or micromollusk in the family Rissoidae.

Subgenus:

- † Alvania curta var. mioelongata Peyrot, 1938
- † Alvania curta nieheimensis Hinsch, 1972: accepted as † Alvania curta (Dujardin, 1837) (within the variability of the nominate)
- † Alvania curta rarecostata Friedberg, 1923 (taxon inquirendum)

== Distribution ==
Fossils of this species were in Lower Oligocene strata near Mérignac, Gironde, France and in Upper Tortonian strata near Vienna, Austria.
