= Church of Saint-Jean-Bosco, Paris =

Church in Paris, France

Church of Saint-Jean-Bosco
- Église Saint-Jean-Bosco de Paris
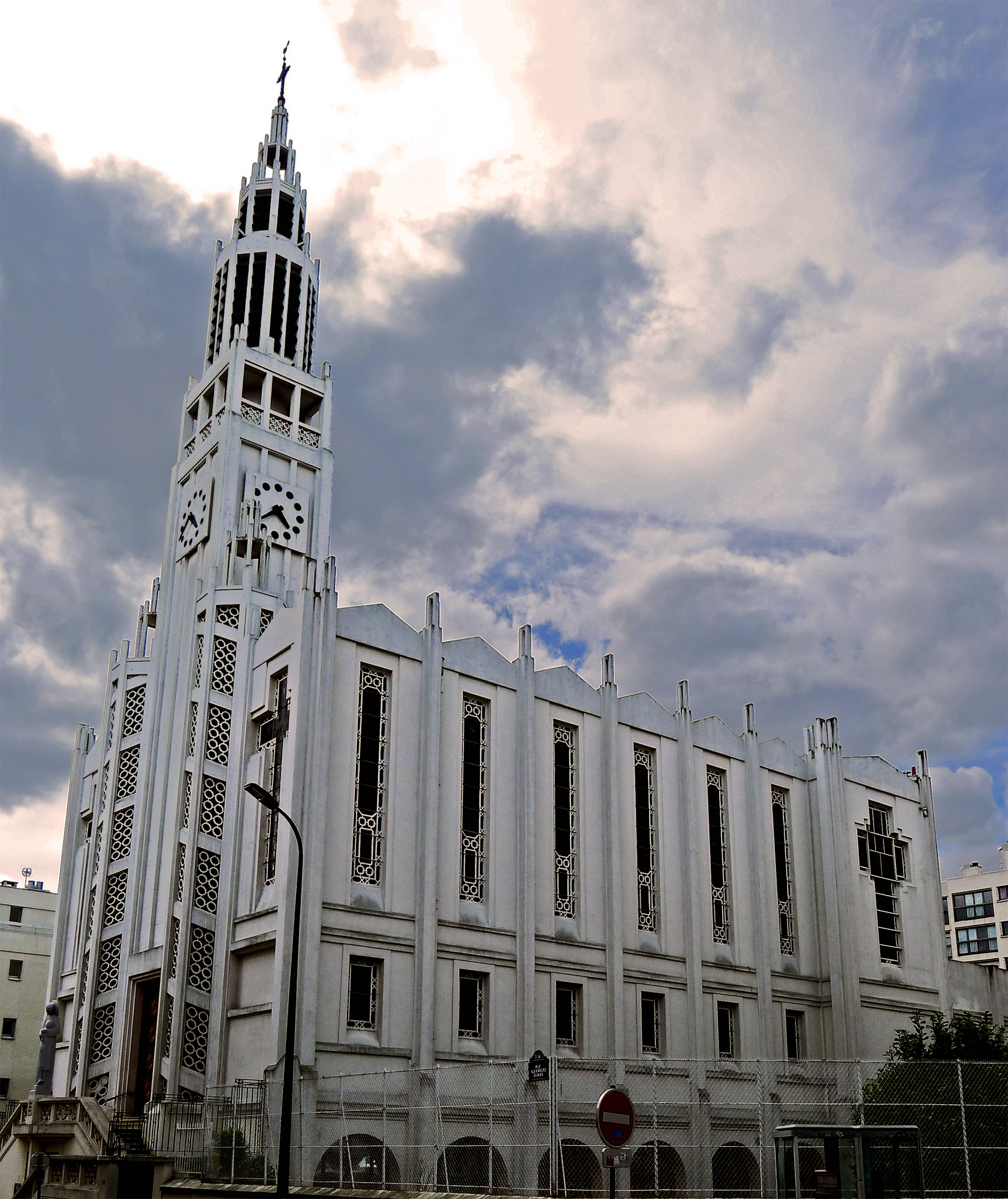
- Church of Saint-Jean-Bosco
- 48°51′18″N 2°23′53″E
- Location: 79 rue Alexandre-Dumas 20th arrondissement of Paris
- Country: France
- Denomination: Roman Catholic Church

History
- Status: Active

Architecture
- Architectural type: Church
- Style: Art Deco
- Groundbreaking: 1933
- Completed: 1937

Administration
- Archdiocese: Archdiocese of Paris

Monument historique
- Official name: Église Saint-Jean-Bosco de Paris
- Type: Église
- Designated: 2001
- Reference no.: PA75200002

The Church of Saint-Jean-Bosco (Église Saint-Jean-Bosco de Paris) is a Roman Catholic church located at 79 rue Alexandre-Dumas in the 20th arrondissement of Paris. Built between 1933 and 1938, it is a rare example of a Paris church in the Art Deco style. It takes its name from Saint John Bosco (1815–1880), an Italian Catholic priest who founded the order of the Salesians of Don Bosco, and devoted his career to promoting education for working-class children, both boys and girls. All of the paintings, murals, stained glass, mosaics, statues and architecture were created within a decade, giving them a harmonious Art Deco style. It was designated as a French national historic monument in 2001.

== History ==
The project for the church was launched by Cardinal Verdier, who became archbishop of Paris in 1929. He observed that some of the rapidly-growing working-class parishes at the edges of Paris had populations of over a hundred thousand persons. He set a goal of having a church for every ten thousand residents. The church became part of his project of The Chantiers du Cardinal, the "Building sites of the Cardinal". The original project for the church was very ambitious, proposing a technical school and dormitories attached to the church. With the beginning of the Great Depression, the project was scaled back to include only the church.

The architect was Dumitro Rotter (1878-1937)]. The first stone was laid by the archbishop and cardinal Jean Verdier in March, 1933. After the death of Rotter in 1937, the work was completed by his son.

The decoration of the church, including painted murals, frescos, mosaics, stained glass and statues, were designed by the Paris firm of the Brothers Mauméjean. The style was later described by the architectural historian Simon Texier as "Between Gothic Art Deco and Neo-Gothic Grecian."

Due largely to the economic depression of the 1930a, and a shortage of funds, the decoration of the interior took longer than the construction of the building. Noted Art Deco artists in several fields collaborated on the church. The decorative ironwork of the church was designed by Raymond Subes, who designed the ironwork for several of the famed French ocean liners of the period. T. he church was originally intended to be used primarily by students of the church school, but in 1938 it also became the parish church; the lower church was reserved students. The decoration was finally completed during the German occupation of Paris, between 1940 and 1944.

== Exterior ==
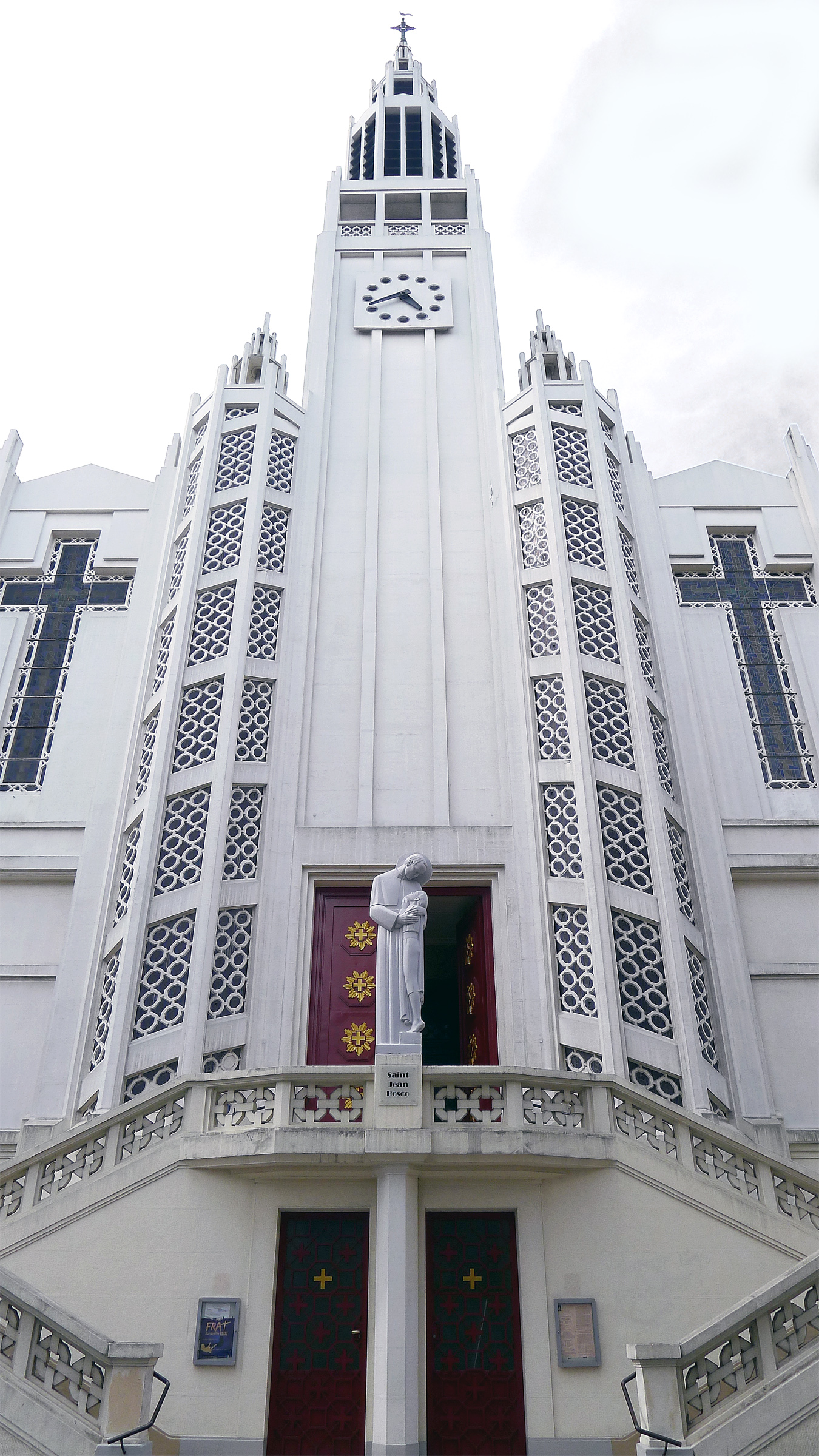
The 53-metre (174 ft) tall bell tower

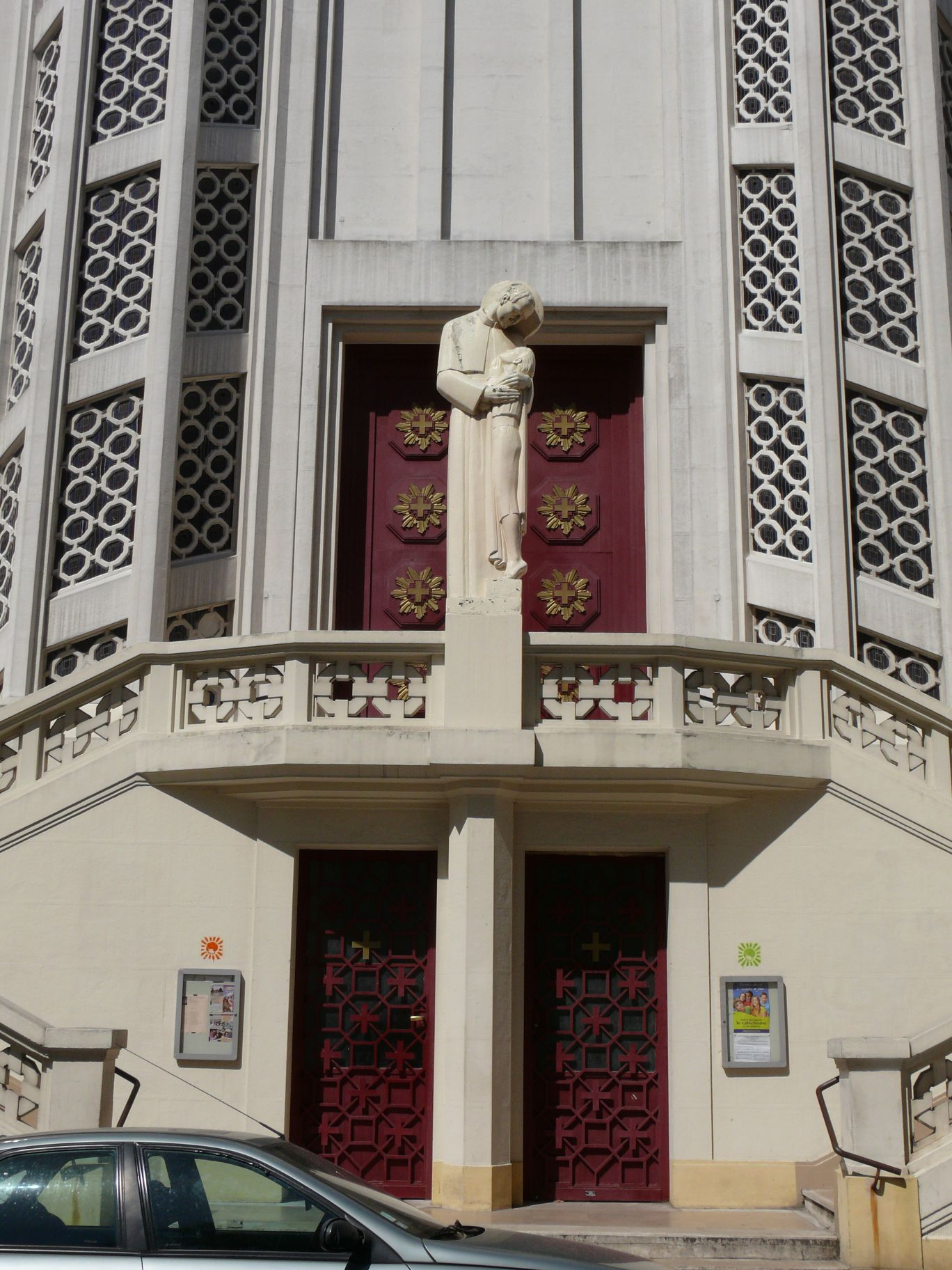
Portal with statue of Saint Jean-Bosco

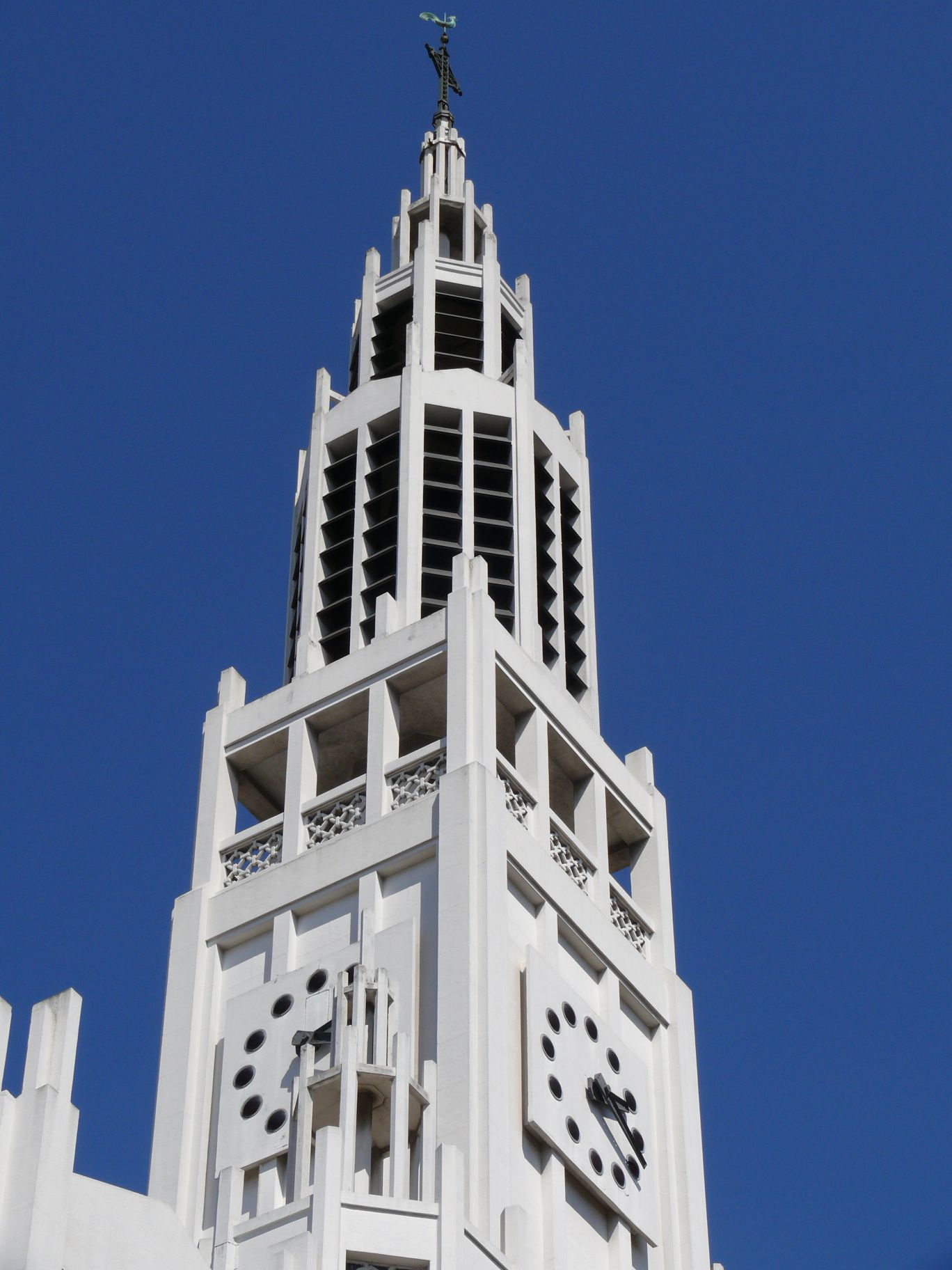
The bell tower

The church was constructed of reinforced concrete between 1933 and 1937. The bell tower was inspired by an Art Deco landmark, the tower of the Église Notre-Dame du Raincy (1923), by August Perret. The tower is fifty-three meters high, and contains a carillon with twenty-eight bells from the Atelier of Pacard. It is flanked on either side by screen walls, which give it a lighter appearance.

== Interior ==
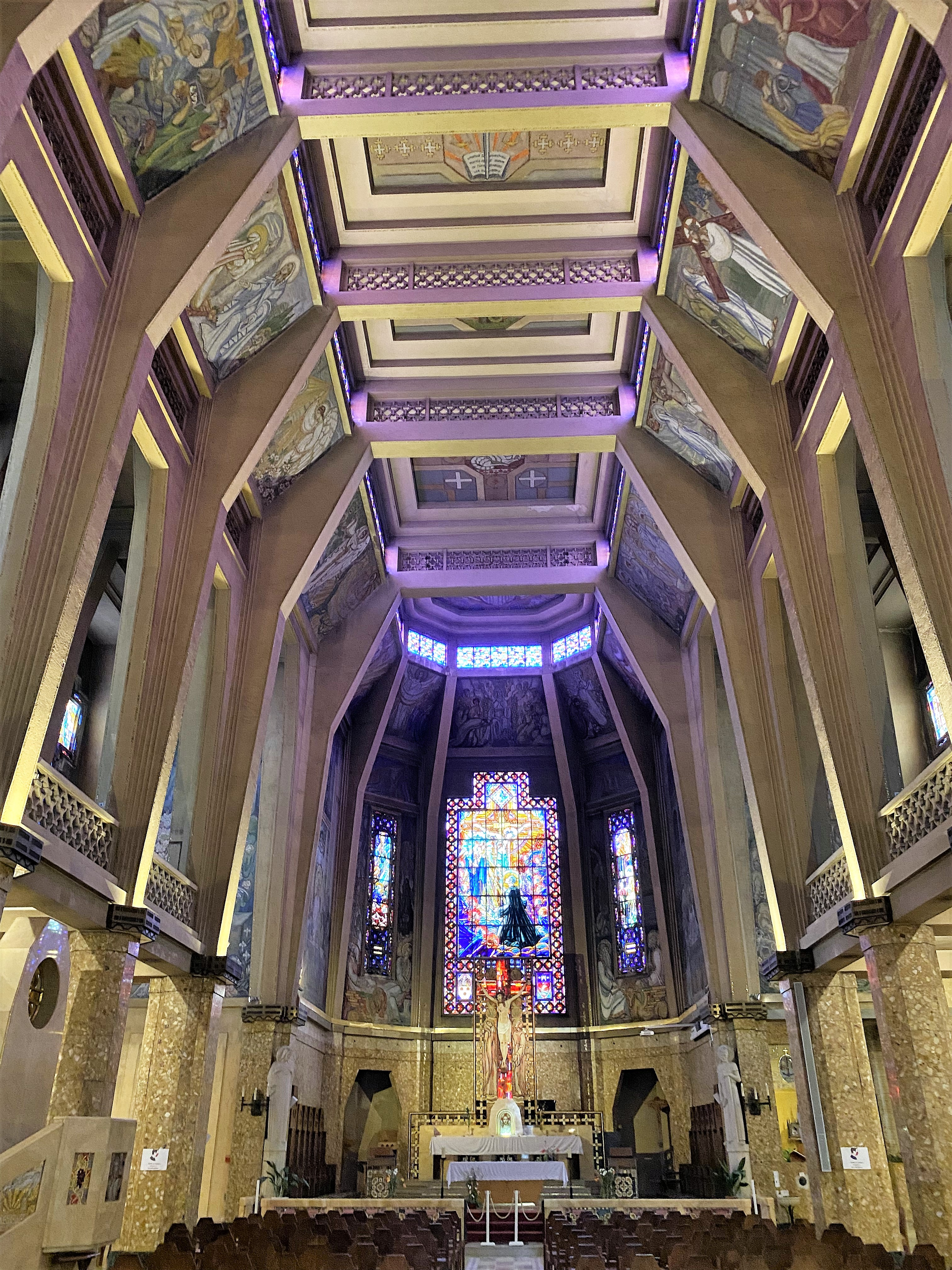
Nave and the choir

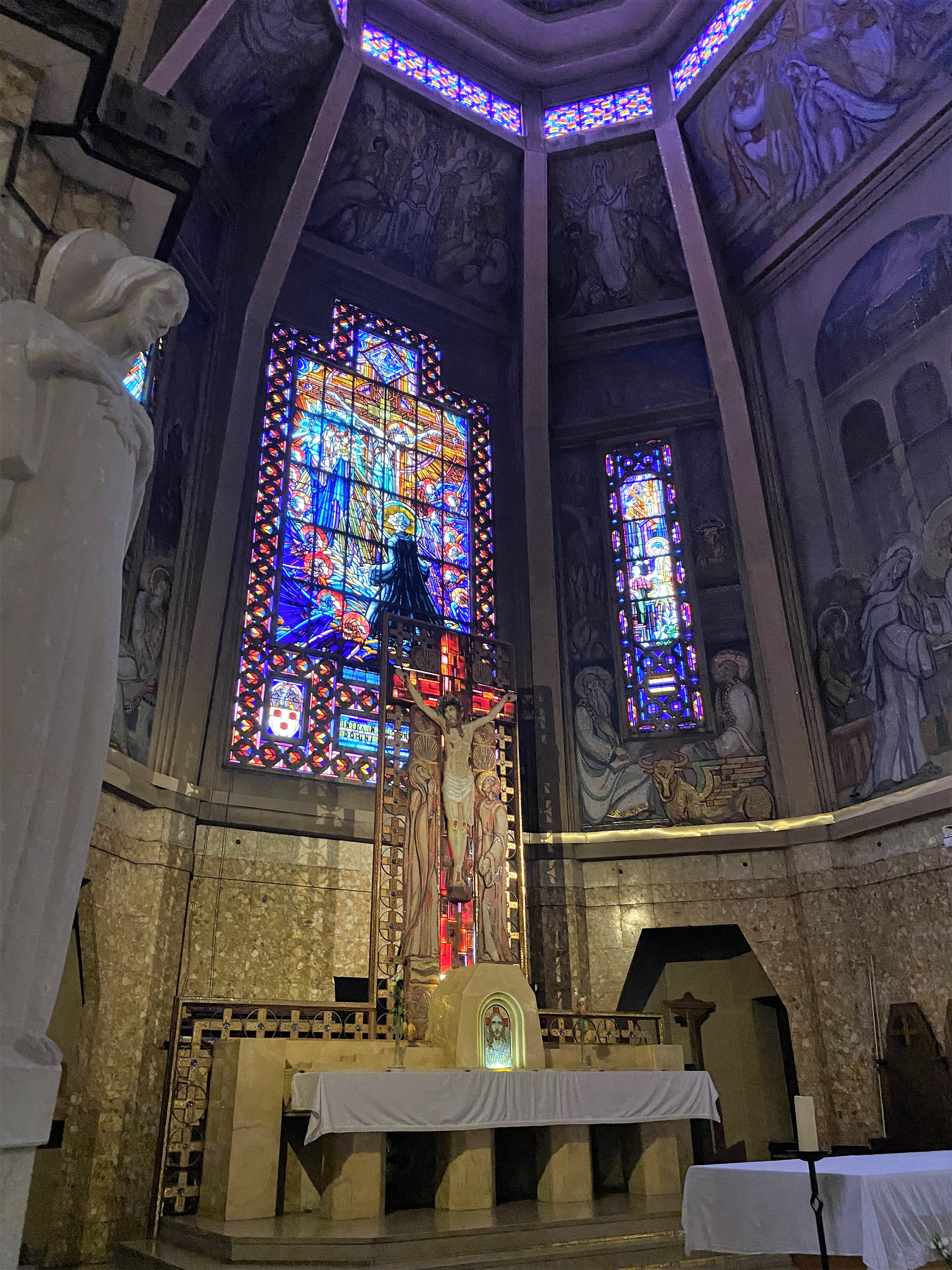
Altar and Choir

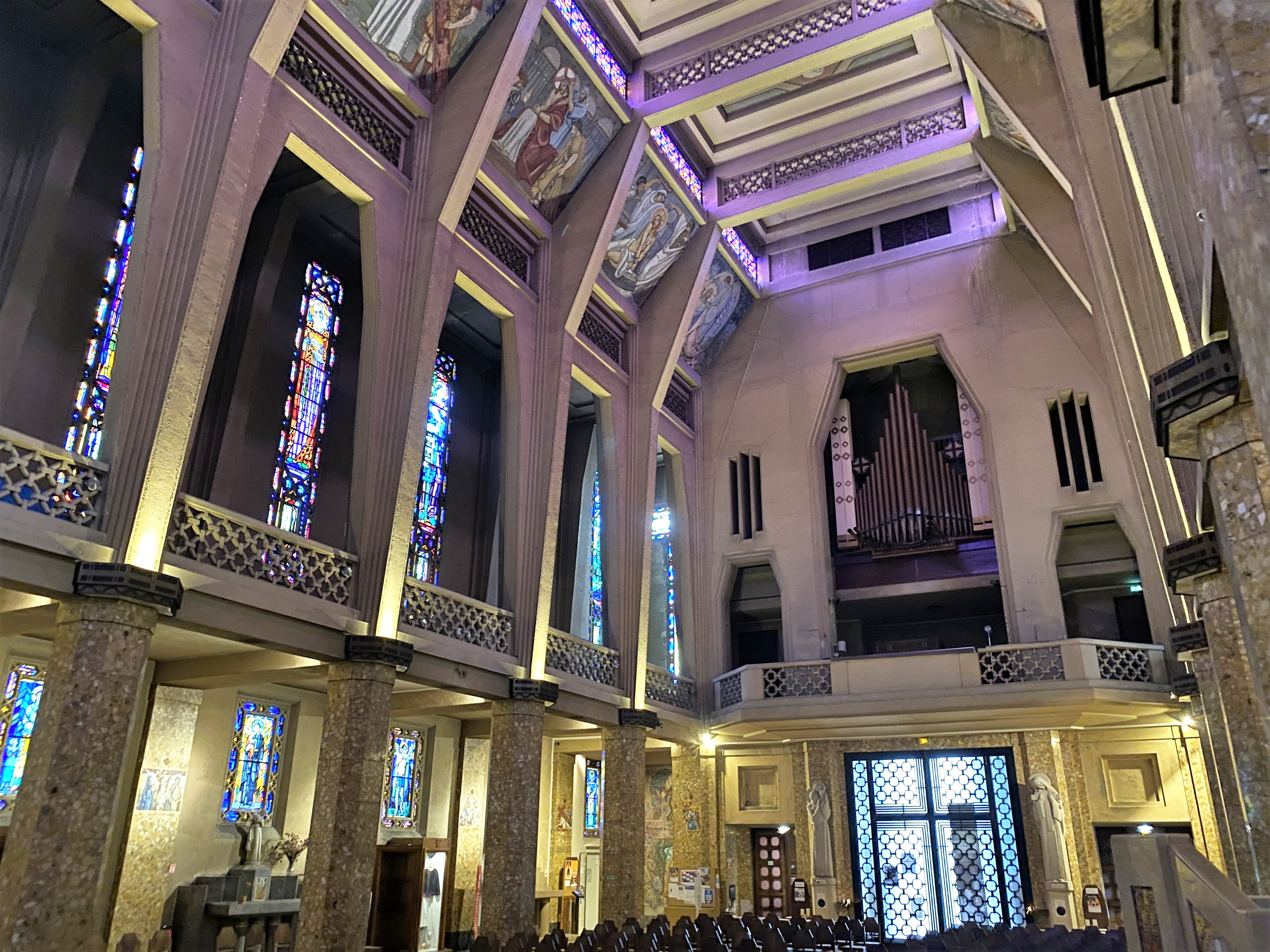
The organ tribune and nave

The nave is lined with massive concrete pillars which divide the nave into six traverses. They support a balcony a third of the way up the nave wall. The stained glass windows on this level provide light to the inside of the church. Above these the pillars support arches, which create a row of rectangular caissons or vaults, which lean inward and are decorated with paintings and ceramics. The ceiling vaults are also filled with art. A very long narrow window runs beneath the ceiling vaults, invisible from the floor below, providing light to the upper level. The architecture and decoration balance each other, so that the abundance of decoration does not seem so overwhelming.

== Art and decoration ==
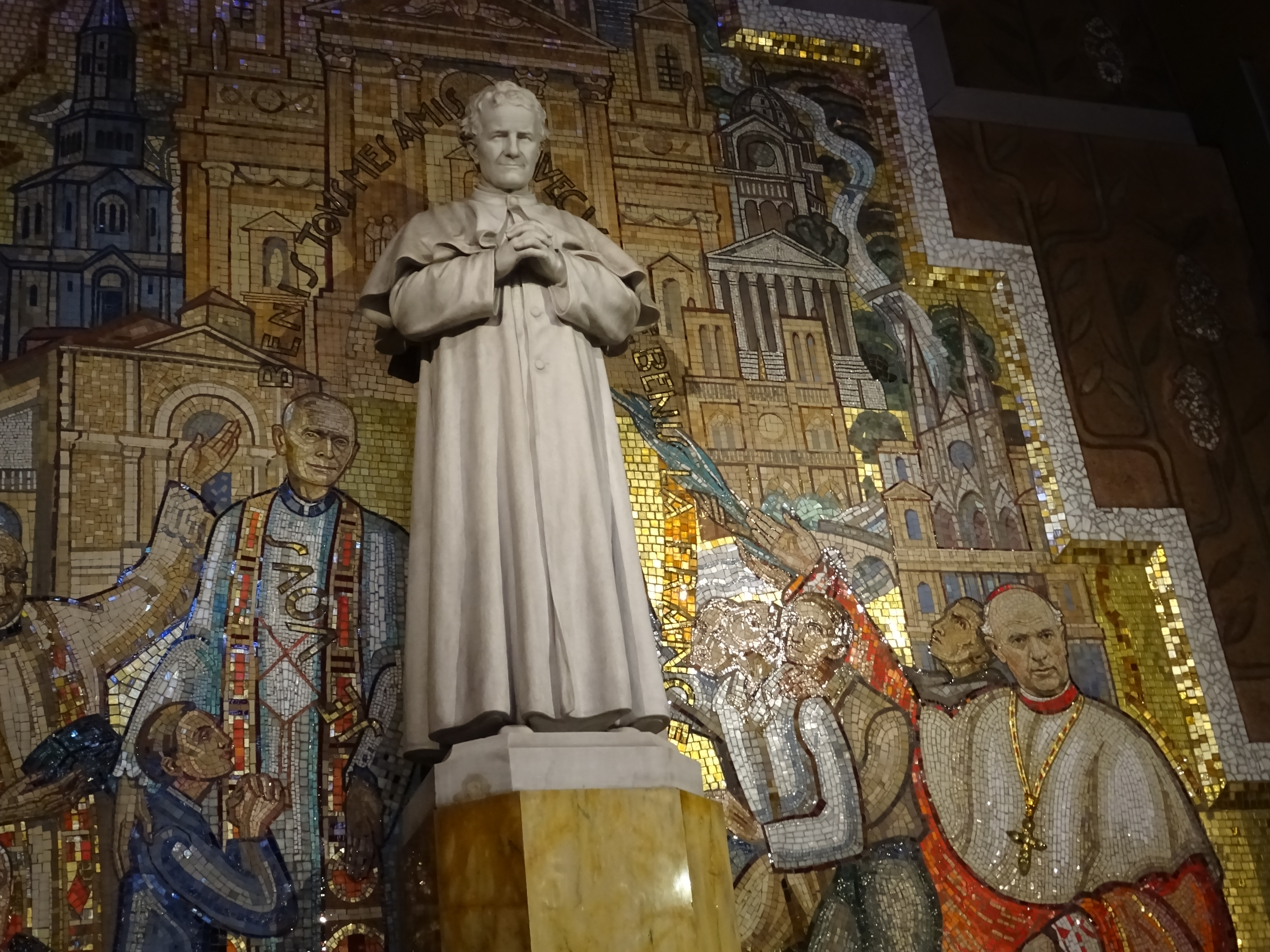
Statue and mosaic of Saint Jean Bosco (right transept)

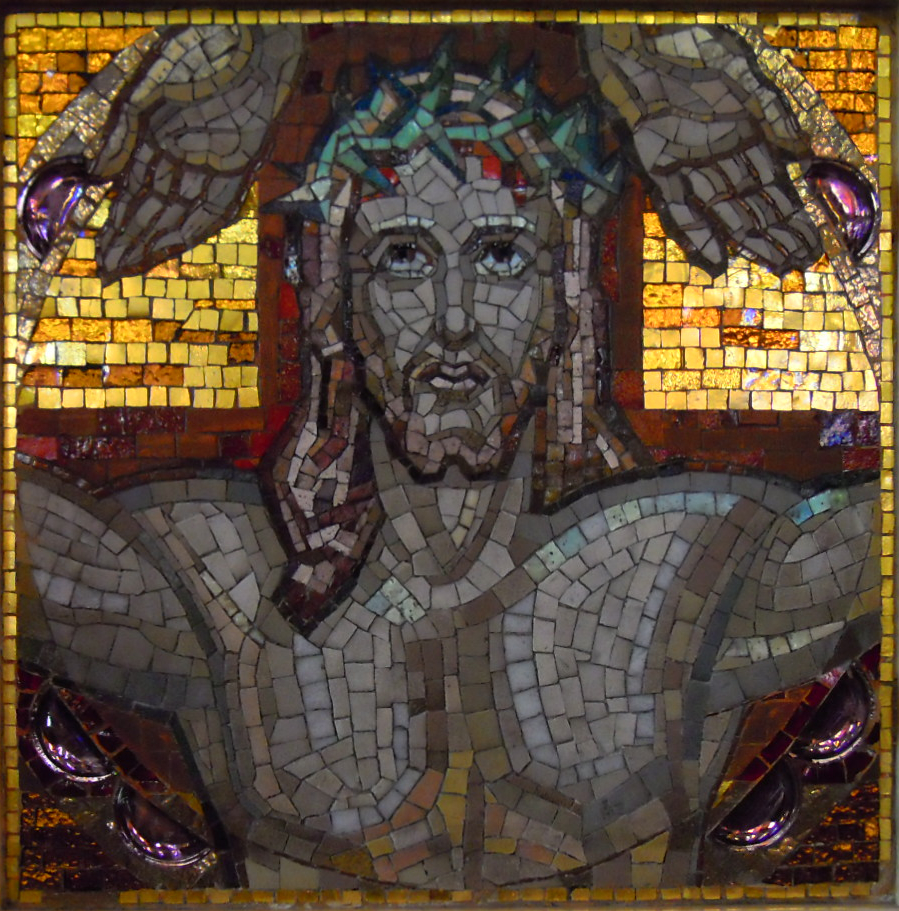
Mosaic of Christ (detail) on the pulpit

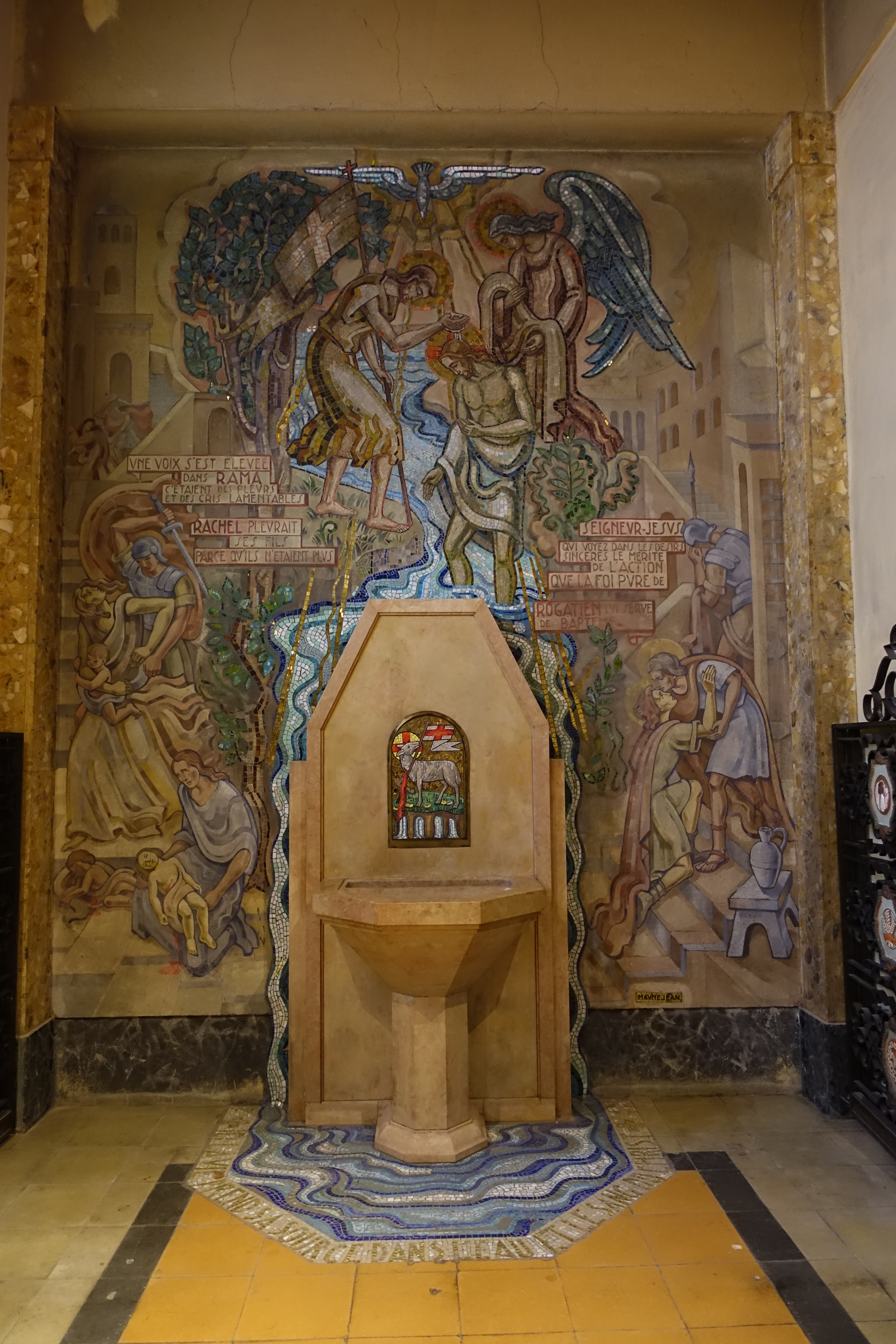
Baptismal font with mosaic River Jordan
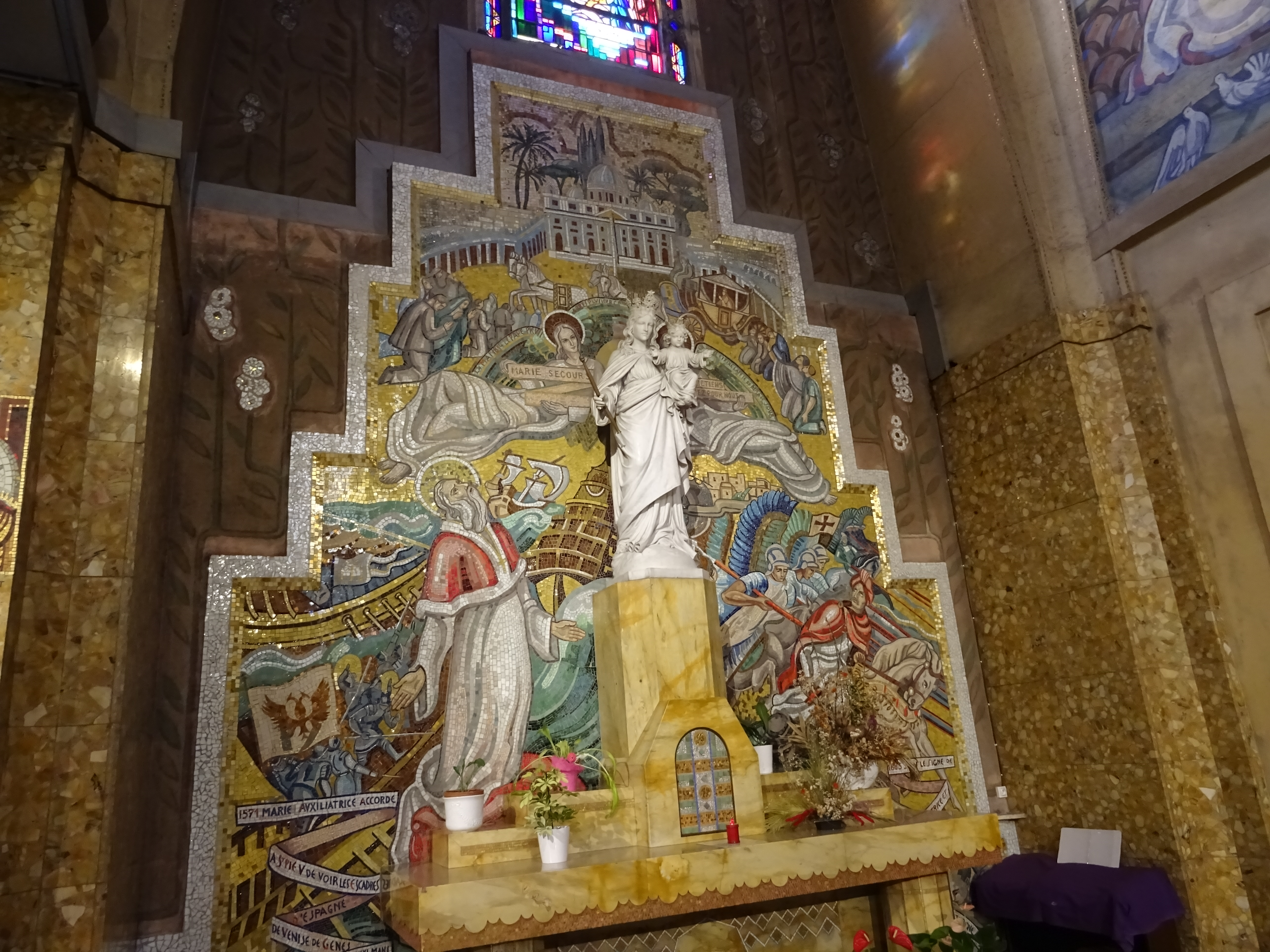
Altar of the Virgin Mary

=== Transept and lower aisles ===
The church does not have a traditional transept that forms a cross at the meeting point of the choir and the nave, but a virtual transept was created by the installation of large monumental sculpture in the lower aisles on either side of the church. The right transept has a monument to Saint Jean Bosco, with his statue against a very elaborate mosaic background depicting scenes from his life. The left transept has an equally large altar with mosaics devoted to à Marie-Auxiliatrice.

The side of the church also has an unusual art deco pulpit, ornamented with onyx stone. The lower aisles also contain the original confessionals of the church, which have been transformed into showcases for precious objects from the church treasury. T

=== Baptistry ===
The Baptistry of the church is highly decorated with mosaics representing the baptism of Christ, the Massacre of the Innocents. and the martyrdom of Saint Rogatien. The mosaics were the work of Charles Mauméjan. A mosaic river, representing the River Jordan, the original site for Christian baptism, pours down the upper mosaic and flows around the baptismal font. The wrought iron grill is the baptistry was made by Paul Kiss, and is decorated with ceramic plaques depicting scenes from the life of the Saint on one side, and his symbols on the other.

=== Vaults of the Nave ===
The Salesian order has a particular devotion to the Virgin Mary; this is illustrated by the "Mysteries of the Rosary", the series of paintings in the vaults of the Nave. -The first in the series depicts the "Mysteries of Joy". It begins with AGreek A, for Adam, showing the coming of Christ to the world to re-establish the alliance the God and mankind, which had been broken by Adam and Eve. -"The Mysteries of Sorrow" depicts the sufferings of Christ, and his carrying of the Cross. -In the choir, the "Mysteries of Glory" Depicts the Resurrection, the ascent of Christ to heaven, the ascent of Mary to heaven, and her crowning. The end of the series is symbolised by the Greek letter Omega, the last letter in the Greek alphabet.

=== Stained glass ===
The stained glass in the church was produced by the workshop of Andre de Brissac, in Grenoble. One group is devoted to the Virgin Mary, while another group depicts scenes from the lives of Saints connected with France, inciting Saint Jean Bosco, Bernadette and Joan of Arc.

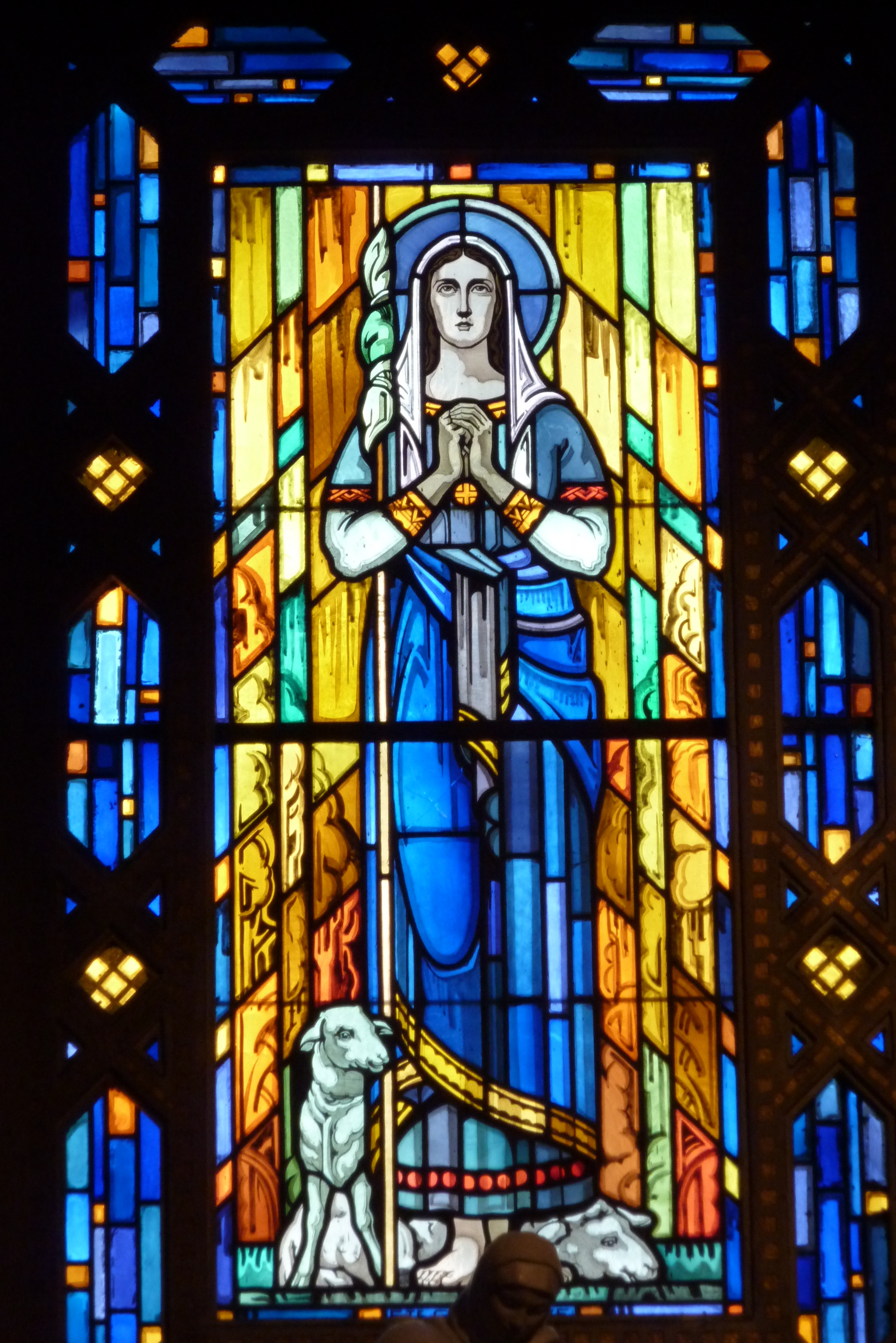
The Virgin Mary

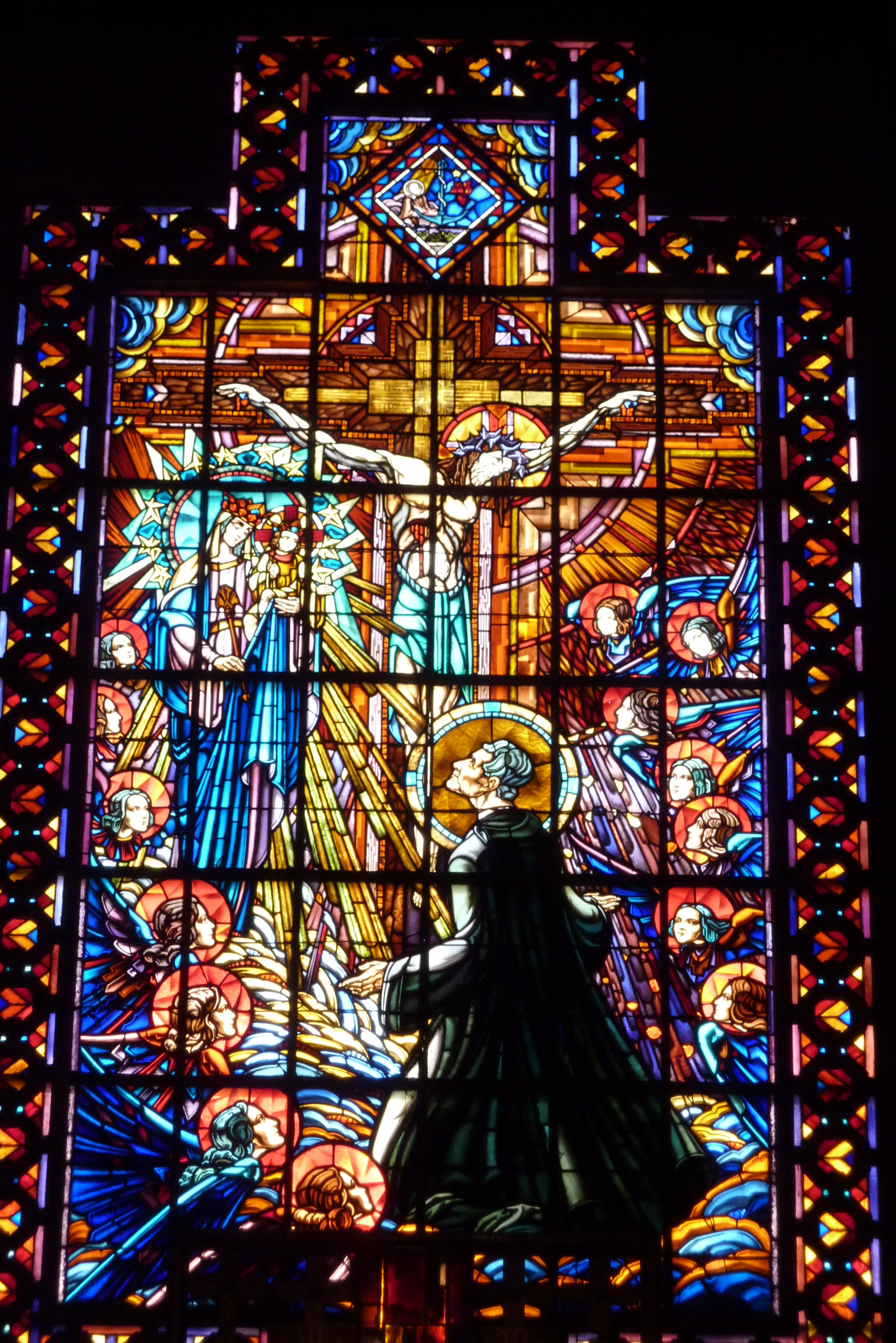
Christ on Cross and Virgin Mary, signed "A. Bessac 1937 Grenoble maître-verrier"

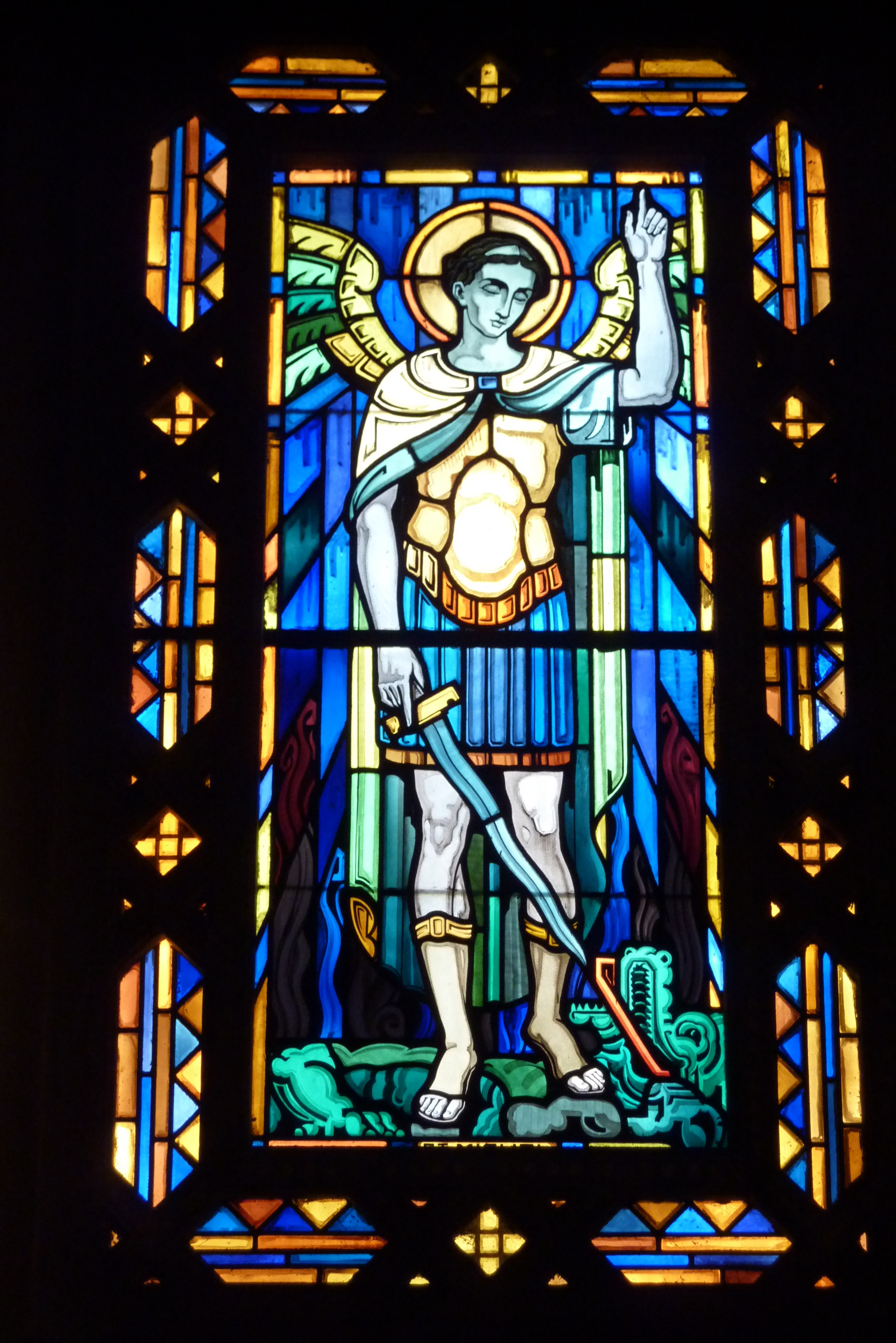
The Archangel Michael
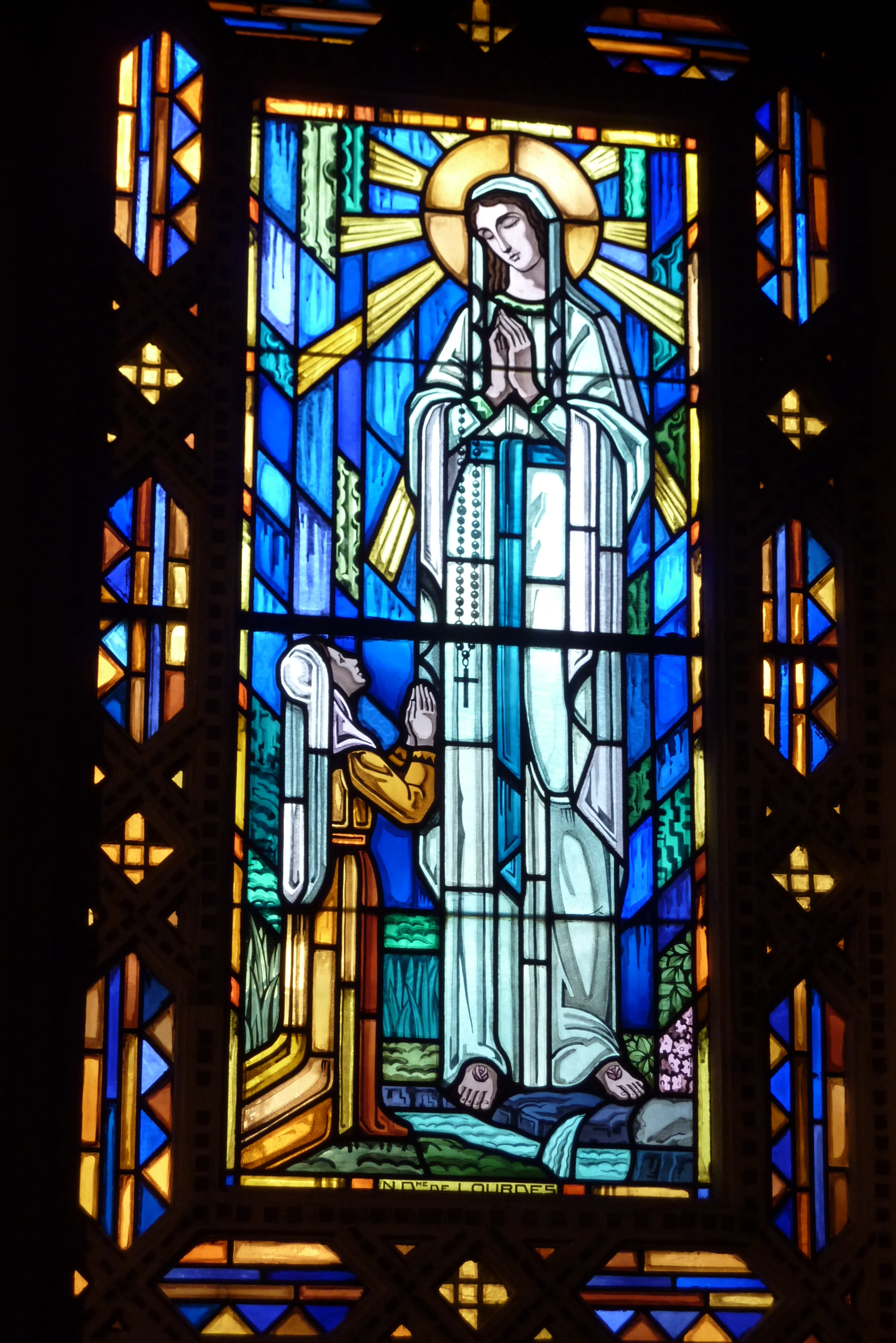
Scenes with French Saints - Notre Dame de Lourdes

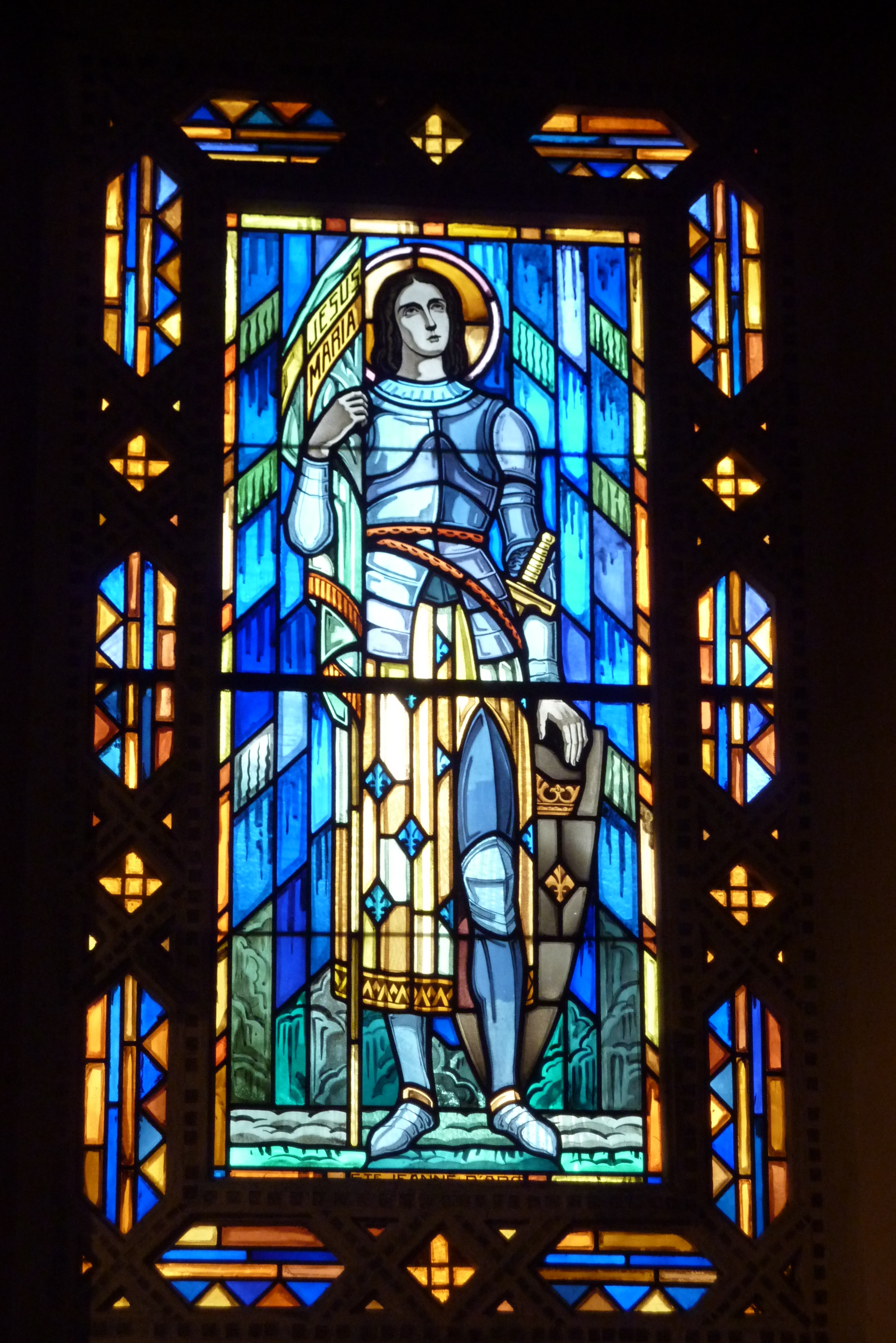
Scenes with French Saints - Joan of Arc

== Organ ==
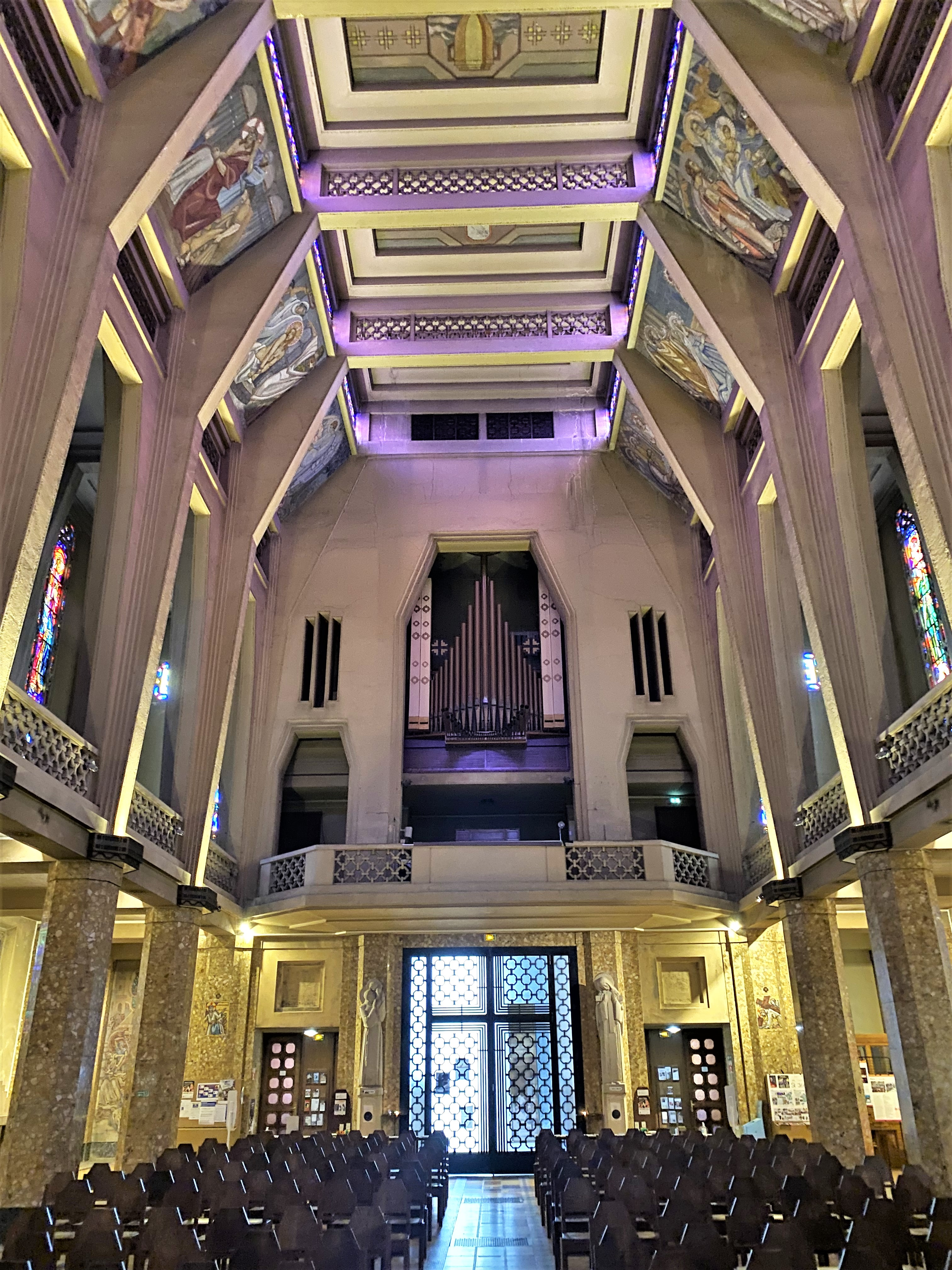
The nave and organ tribune

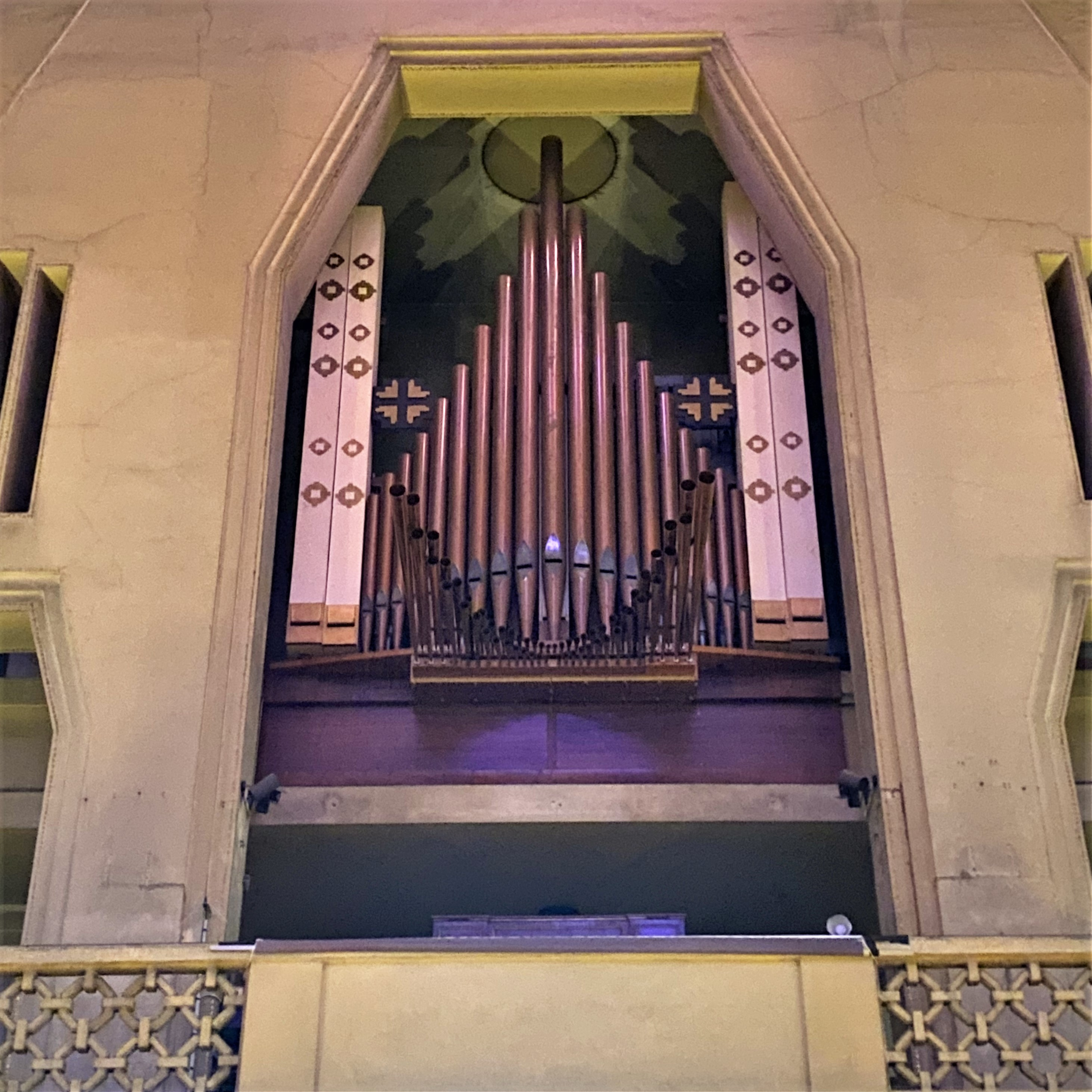
The organ on the tribune

The grand organ, located in the tribune at the opposite end from the choir, was built by the firm of Gloton, and has forty-five jeux, or sets of pipes.

== See also ==
- List of historic churches in Paris

== External links (in French) ==
- Site Internet de la Paroisse Saint Jean Bosco
- Éclairage artistique sur l'église Saint Jean Bosco
- Descr[ption of church on Patrimoine-histoire.fr
