= Le Haillan =

Le Haillan Halhan (Occitan)
- Commune
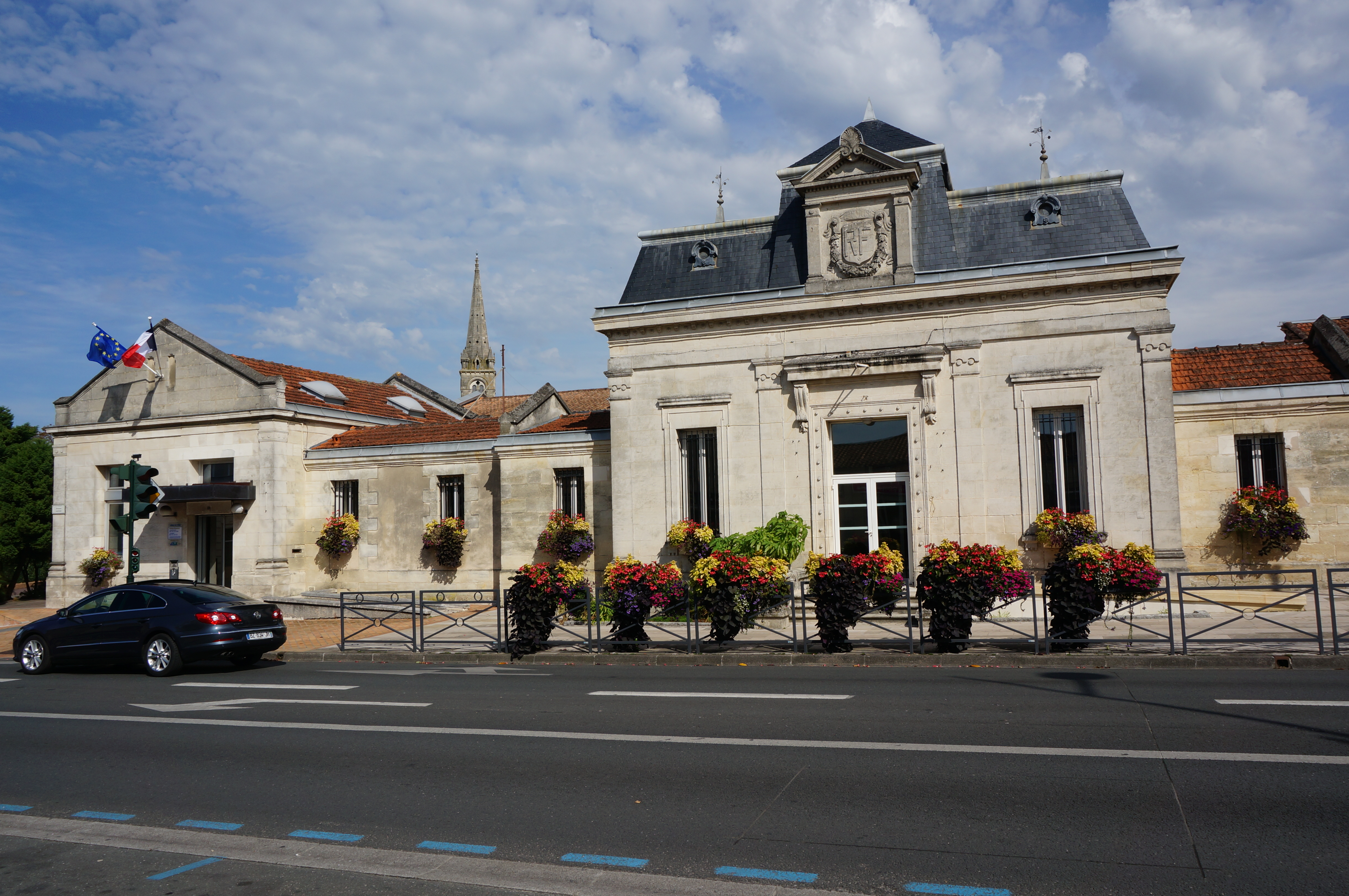
- Town hall

- Coat of arms
- Location of Le Haillan
- Location within France Location within Nouvelle-Aquitaine
- Coordinates: 44°52′21″N 0°40′33″W
- Country: France
- Region: Nouvelle-Aquitaine
- Department: Gironde
- Arrondissement: Bordeaux
- Canton: Mérignac-1
- Intercommunality: Bordeaux Métropole

Government
  - Mayor (2020–2026): Andréa Kiss
- Area^{1}: 9.26 km^{2} (3.58 sq mi)
- Elevation: 32 m (105 ft)
- Highest elevation: 47 m (154 ft)
- Lowest elevation: 8 m (26 ft)
- Population (2023): 11,392
  - Density: 1,230/km^{2} (3,190/sq mi)
- Time zone: UTC+01:00 (CET)
  - Summer (DST): UTC+02:00 (CEST)
- INSEE/Postal code: 33200 /33185
- ^{1} French Land Register data, which excludes lakes, ponds, glaciers > 1 km^{2} (0.386 sq mi or 247 acres) and river estuaries.

Le Haillan (French pronunciation: [lə ajɑ̃]; Occitan: Halhan) is a commune in the Gironde department in south-western France.

It is a suburb of the city of Bordeaux, and is adjacent to it on the northwest side.

== Population ==
Historical population
Year	Pop.	±% p.a.
1968	2,272	—
1975	3,949	+8.22%
1982	5,584	+5.07%
1990	6,974	+2.82%
1999	8,133	+1.72%
2007	8,407	+0.42%
2012	9,632	+2.76%
2017	11,018	+2.73%
2023	11,392	+0.56%
Source: INSEE

== Landmarks ==
- Château Bel Air

== Sister cities ==
- Colindres, Spain
- Kalampaka, Greece
- Enderby, England

== See also ==
- Communes of the Gironde department
