= Parc de Bourran =

Park in Mérignac, Nouvelle-Aquitaine, France

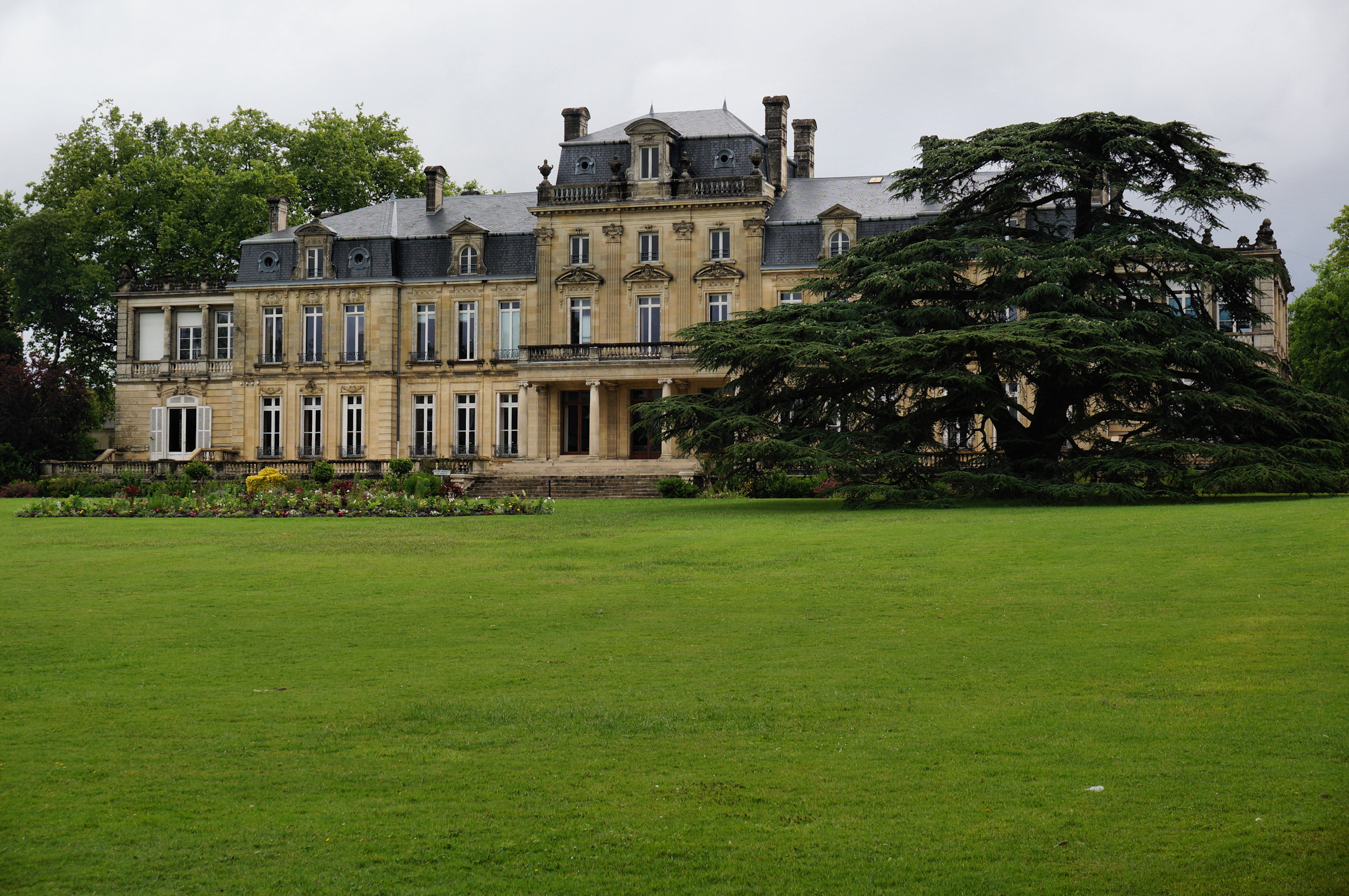
- Château Bourran.
- Interactive map of Parc de Bourran
- Type: Urban Park
- Location: France
- Nearest city: Mérignac
- Coordinates: 44°50′14″N 0°37′49″W
- Area: 18 hectares (44 acres)
- Established: 1985
- Water: Pond
- Designation: Monument classé Mérimée
- Website: www.merignac.com/mon-quotidien/la-ville/parcs-et-jardins/parc-de-bourran

The Parc de Bourran is a French urban park in the commune of Mérignac, in the Gironde department of the Nouvelle-Aquitaine. It was designed by landscape architect Le Breton, in 1870. The park and its château were registered as French national heritage sites on January 9, 1992.

== History ==
The Parc de Bourran estate is home to the Château de Bourran. The former château belonged to François-Armand de Saige, advocate general of the Bordeaux provincial parlement, former commander of the Revolutionary National Guard (1789), and former mayor of Bordeaux (1791). François-Armand de Saige was arrested during the Reign of Terror and executed on October 23, 1793. His property was inventoried in December 1793.

The day-to-day life of the Château de Bourran as well as its wine-producing activity can be reconstructed from this inventory. The estate produced between 38 and 80 barrels of red wine classed in the Graves up until the phylloxera plague.

The estate was acquired at the end of the 19th century by ship-owner Émile Ravesies and his son-in-law, banker Piganneau. In 1869, they rebuilt the manor according to plans made by the architects Jules et Paul Lafargue. Three triple-bayed corps de logis, capped by a slate roof, face the park. In 1890, the owners entrusted the Orléanais landscape architect Le Breton with the design of the park, which included connecting the Devèze river to a pond, constructing small bridges over the river, and installing a decorative stone gate.

From 1912 on, the vineyards were divided into lots to build the Bourranville subdivision. The estate was requisitioned in 1944 to lodge the école normale d'instituteurs, and became the property of the Gironde Departmental Council in 1947. The château houses the headquarters of the Ecole Supérieure du Professorat et de l'Education (ESPE) of the Nouvelle-Aquitaine. The park is public and managed by the commune of Mérignac.

== Geography ==
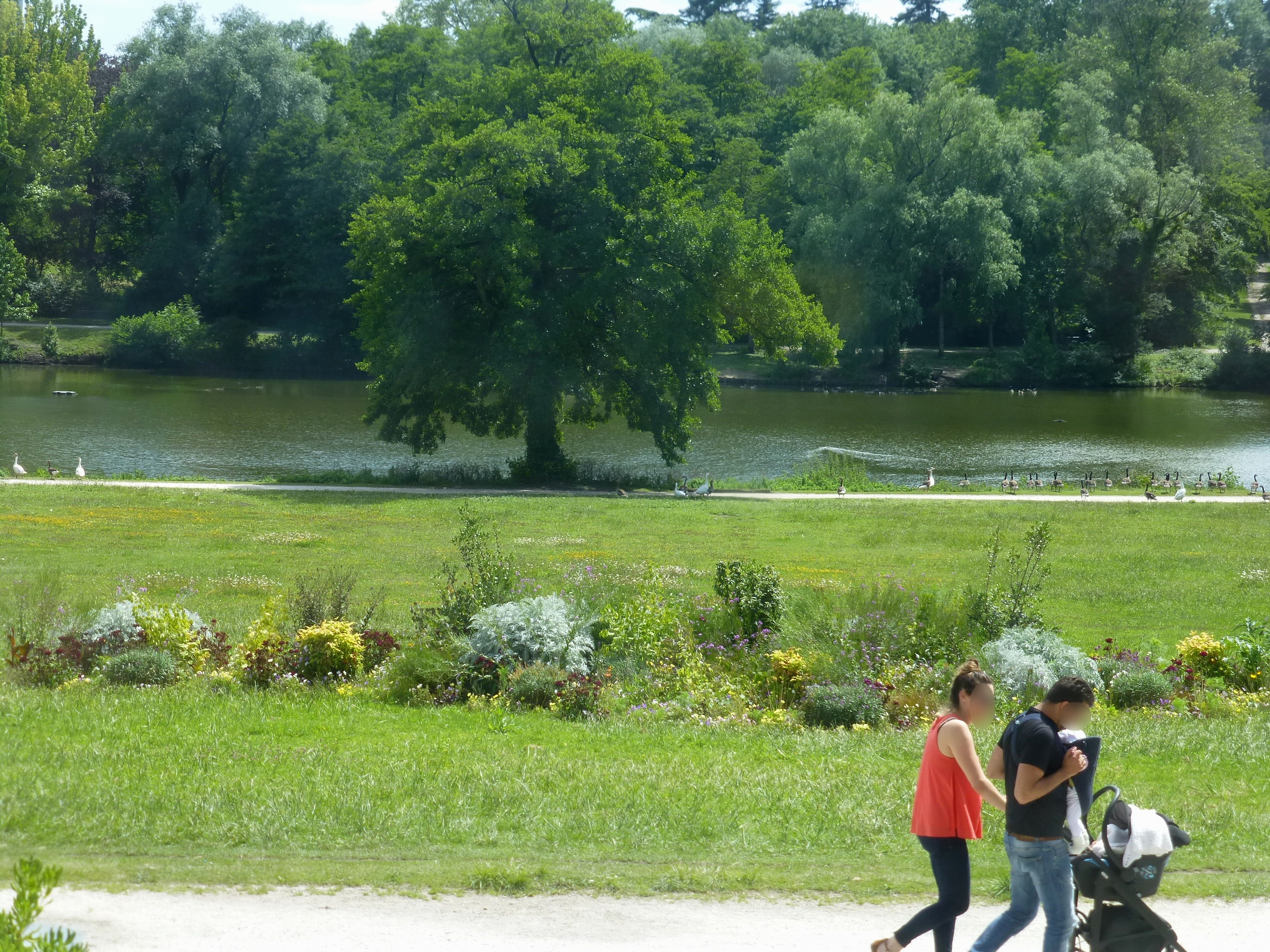
Alder alongside the pond, June 2016

The Parc de Bourran spreads over 18 hectares (44 acres), enhanced by a large pond fed by the Devèze river. A bridge runs across the river and the river includes an artificial waterfall. The park is planted with many tree species and a lawn with floral gardens. It contains three playgrounds as well as exotic animals and beehives.

Twenty-four tree species, many imported from North America, are catalogued in the topoguide: alder, white hickory, European hornbeam, Atlas cedar, California incense-cedar, Lebanon cedar, Himalayan cedar, shingle oak, Turkey oak, northern red oak, holm oak, American sweetgum, baldcypress, common ash, common beech, common yew, southern magnolia, dawn redwood, Caucasian elm, London plane, white willow, giant sequoia, coast redwood, purple beech. A labeling system with both the common and the scientific name identifies the different trees.
