= Maison carrée d'Arlac =

Coordinates: 44°49′41″N 0°37′22″W

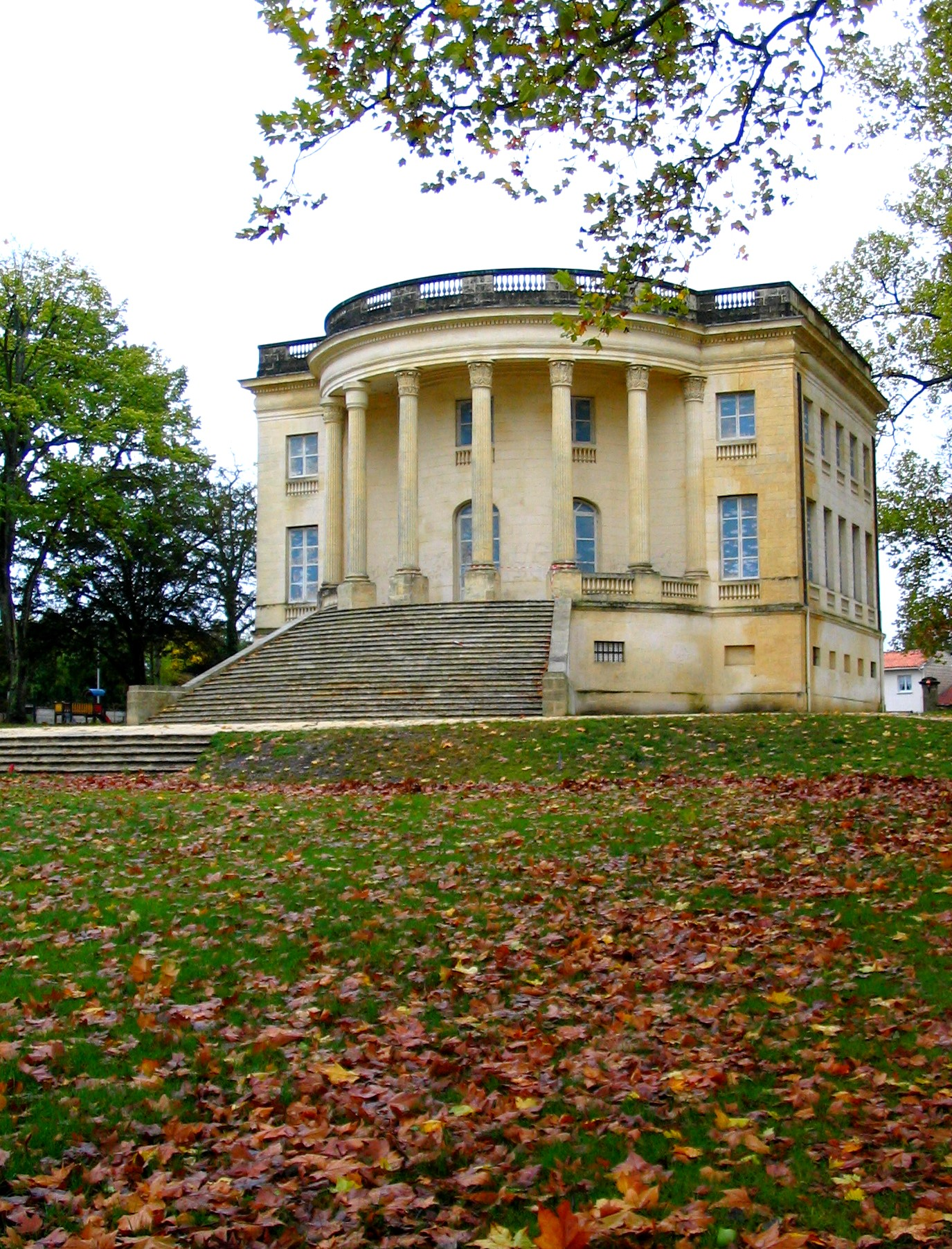
Maison carrée d'Arlac

The Maison carrée d'Arlac is a neoclassical folly building constructed between 1785 and 1789, in the town of Mérignac just outside Bordeaux, France. It was built for Bordeaux banker Charles Peixotto.
