= Hôtel de Ville, Mérignac =

Town hall in Mérignac, France

Hôtel de Ville
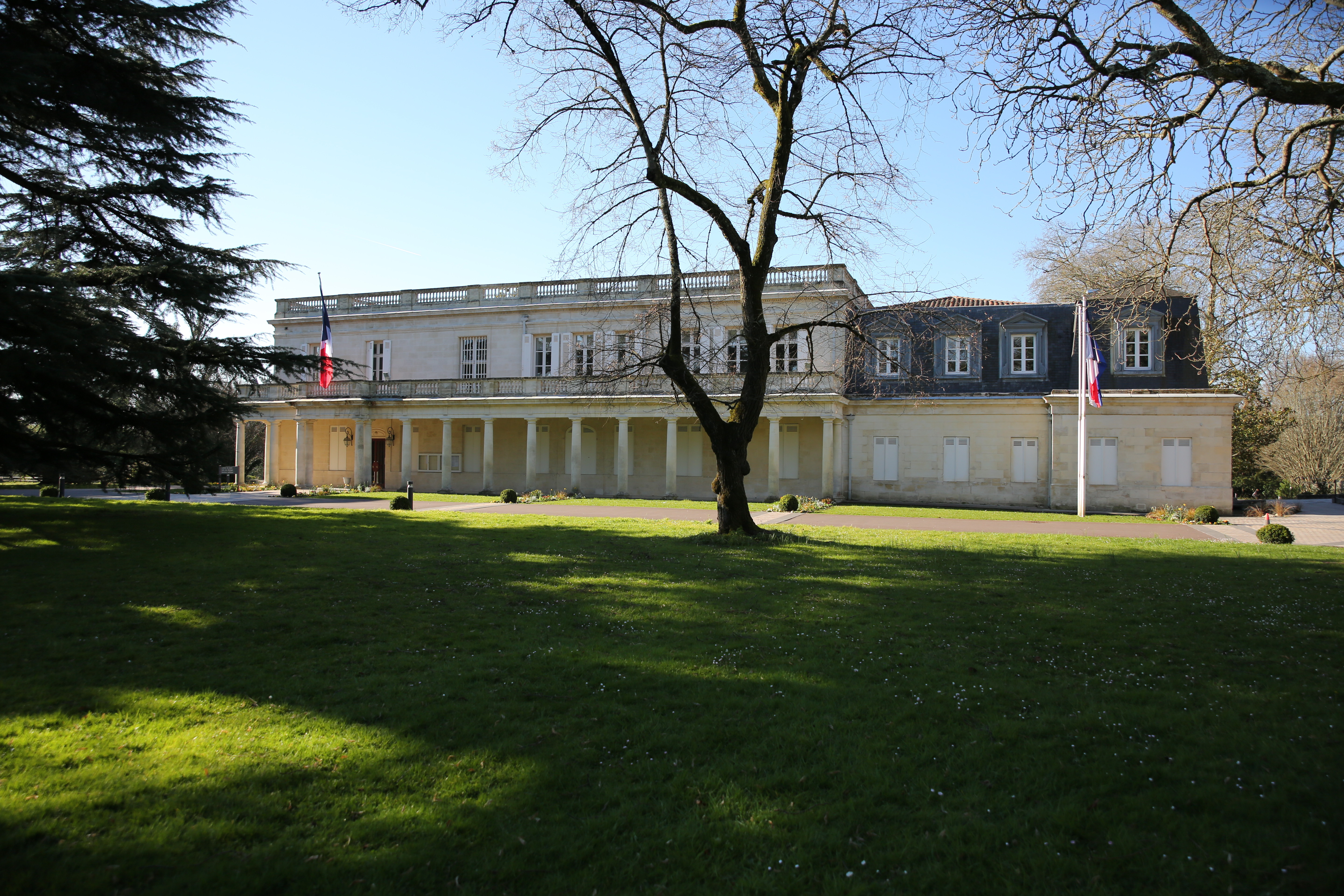
- The main frontage of the Hôtel de Ville in March 2014
- Interactive map of the Hôtel de Ville area

General information
- Type: City hall
- Architectural style: Neoclassical style
- Location: Mérignac, France
- Coordinates: 44.8453°N 0.6572°W
- Completed: 1790

The Hôtel de Ville (French pronunciation: [otɛl də vil], City Hall) is a municipal building in Mérignac, Gironde, southwestern France, standing on Avenue du Maréchal de Lattre de Tassigny.

== History ==
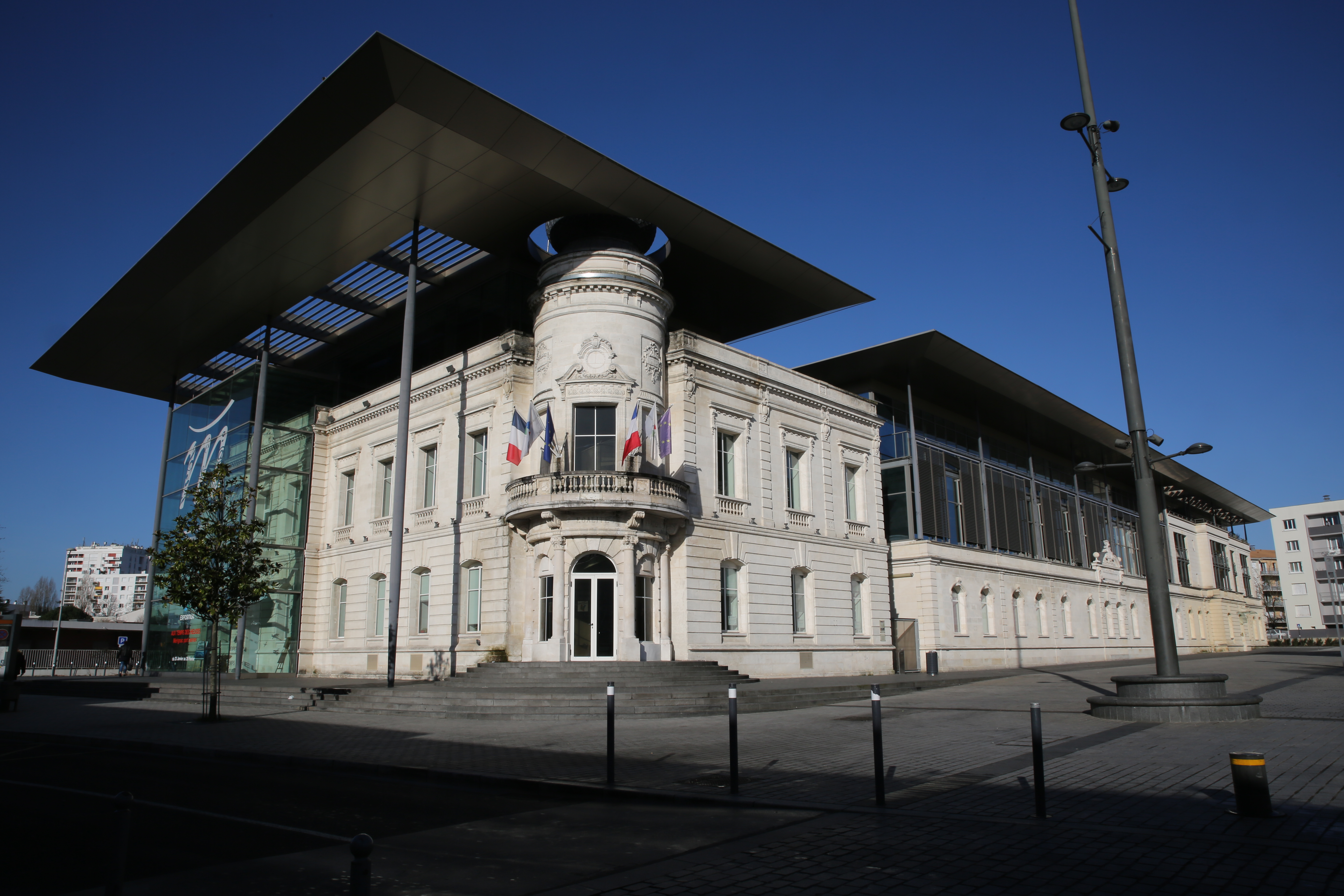
The former town hall of 1905, today a library; the canopy is modern

Following the French Revolution, the town council met in the house of the local mayor. This arrangement continued until the council acquired Chartreuse Grezeaud (the charterhouse of Grezeaud) in 1862. In the late 19th century, the council decided to commission a dedicated town hall. The site they selected was on Avenue de l'Yser, adjacent to the local primary school known as "Groupe Scolaire du Bourg". The new building was designed by Achille Monginoux in the neoclassical style, built in ashlar stone and was completed in 1905. The design involved a prominent cylindrical tower at the south east corner of the building. The tower featured a round headed doorway flanked by a pair of round-headed windows on the ground floor which was rusticated. The bays were separated by Ionic order columns supporting a circular balustraded balcony. There was a French door on the first floor and, at roof level, there was a circular modillioned cornice and a parapet surmounted by a mushroom-shaped dome.

By the early 1970s, the old town hall was considered too small and the town council decided to acquire a more substantial property. The property they selected was the Château Le Vivier, which was set in a large park. The château had been commissioned by an officer in the marines and colonial planter, Charles Blanc, and was completed in 1790. It was subsequently owned by a solicitor, Thomas Lumière, who was executed during the French Revolution. It was then occupied by the Berton family in the first half of the 19th century and by the Lafaye family in the second half of the 19th century. It was next owned and enlarged by Lady Jeanne Merman in the early 20th century, and then acquired by a Cognac merchant, Yorick Exshaw, in 1902.

When the Vichy Government relocated to Bordeaux in June 1940, during the Second World War, the building became the headquarters of the French Air Ministry, before being seized by the Luftwaffe for use by their local commanders. After the war it was returned to the Exshaw family, and remained in their ownership until it was acquired by the council in 1972. After conversion for municipal use, under the supervision of the mayor, Michel Sainte-Marie, the building was officially opened by the mayor of Lille, Pierre Mauroy, in 1976. The park was opened to the public in 1979.

The main frontage faced northeast towards Avenue du Maréchal de Lattre de Tassigny. It featured a colonnade, formed by a long row of Doric order columns supporting a balustraded parapet, which had been added in the early 20th century. The first floor was fenestrated by casement windows with shutters and there was another balustraded parapet at roof level. A modern extension, built to a design by Jean Pierre Soulard, was commissioned to accommodate the municipal archives and was completed in March 1980. This building also accommodated the library service until it relocated to the Médiathèque in November 2007.
