= Château de Larnagol =

Castle in Occitania, France

Coordinates: 44.4759°N 1.7780°E

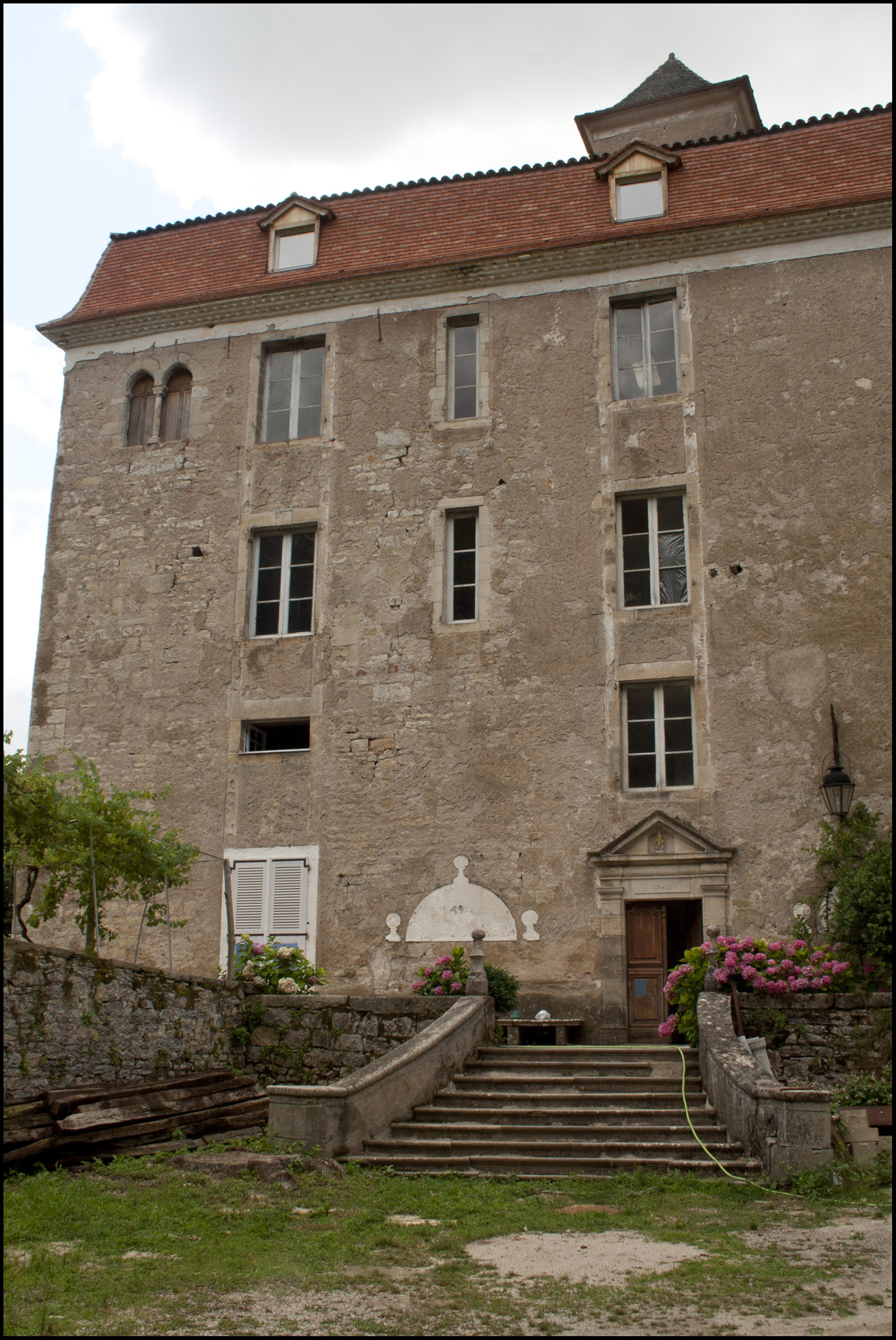
Facade of the castle of Larnagol

The Château de Larnagol or Castrum de Larnagol is a castle in the commune of Larnagol in the Lot département of France.

Remnants of the castle date back to the 13th century. The present appearance of the buildings is the result of a reconstruction following an important campaign of decoration in the 18th century. It was further enriched at the start of the 20th century following its acquisition by Raymond Subes, a decorative artist who specialised in ironwork.

The site is owned by the commune. It has been listed since 2001 as a monument historique by the French Ministry of Culture.

== See also ==
- List of castles in France
