= Mérignac, Gironde =

Mérignac
- Commune
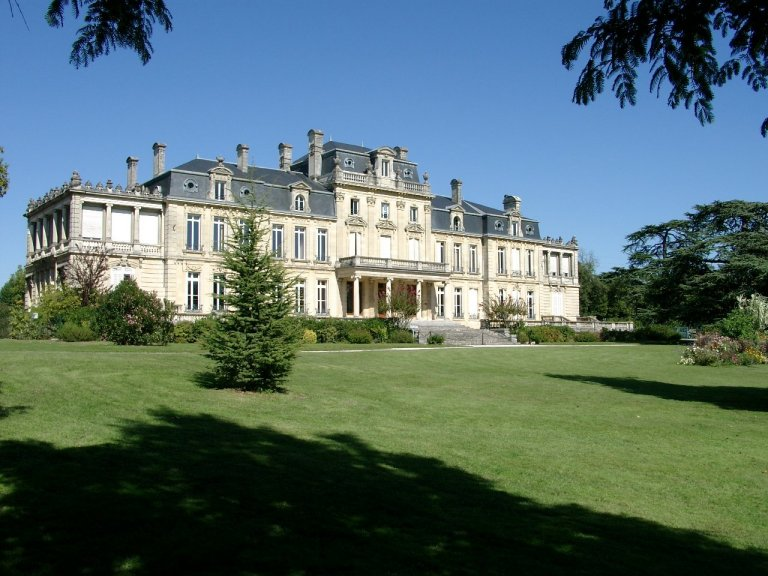
- Castle of Bourran

- Coat of arms
- Location of Mérignac
- Location within France Location within Nouvelle-Aquitaine
- Coordinates: 44°50′19″N 0°38′37″W
- Country: France
- Region: Nouvelle-Aquitaine
- Department: Gironde
- Arrondissement: Bordeaux
- Canton: Mérignac-1 and 2
- Intercommunality: Bordeaux Métropole

Government
  - Mayor (2025–2026): Thierry Trijoulet (PS)
- Area^{1}: 48.17 km^{2} (18.60 sq mi)
- Highest elevation: 53 m (174 ft)
- Lowest elevation: 12 m (39 ft)
- Population (2023): 78,090
  - Density: 1,621/km^{2} (4,199/sq mi)
- Time zone: UTC+01:00 (CET)
  - Summer (DST): UTC+02:00 (CEST)
- INSEE/Postal code: 33281 /33700
- ^{1} French Land Register data, which excludes lakes, ponds, glaciers > 1 km^{2} (0.386 sq mi or 247 acres) and river estuaries.

Mérignac (French pronunciation: [meʁiɲak]; Occitan: Merinhac) is a commune in the Gironde department in Nouvelle-Aquitaine in southwestern France.

It is the largest suburb of the city of Bordeaux and adjoins it to the west. It is a member of the Bordeaux Métropole.

Mérignac is the site of Bordeaux International Airport.

== Etymology ==
The name Mérignac derives from the Gallo-Roman word Matriniacus, name of a villa rustica (countryside villa) that was the origin of today's town.

== History ==
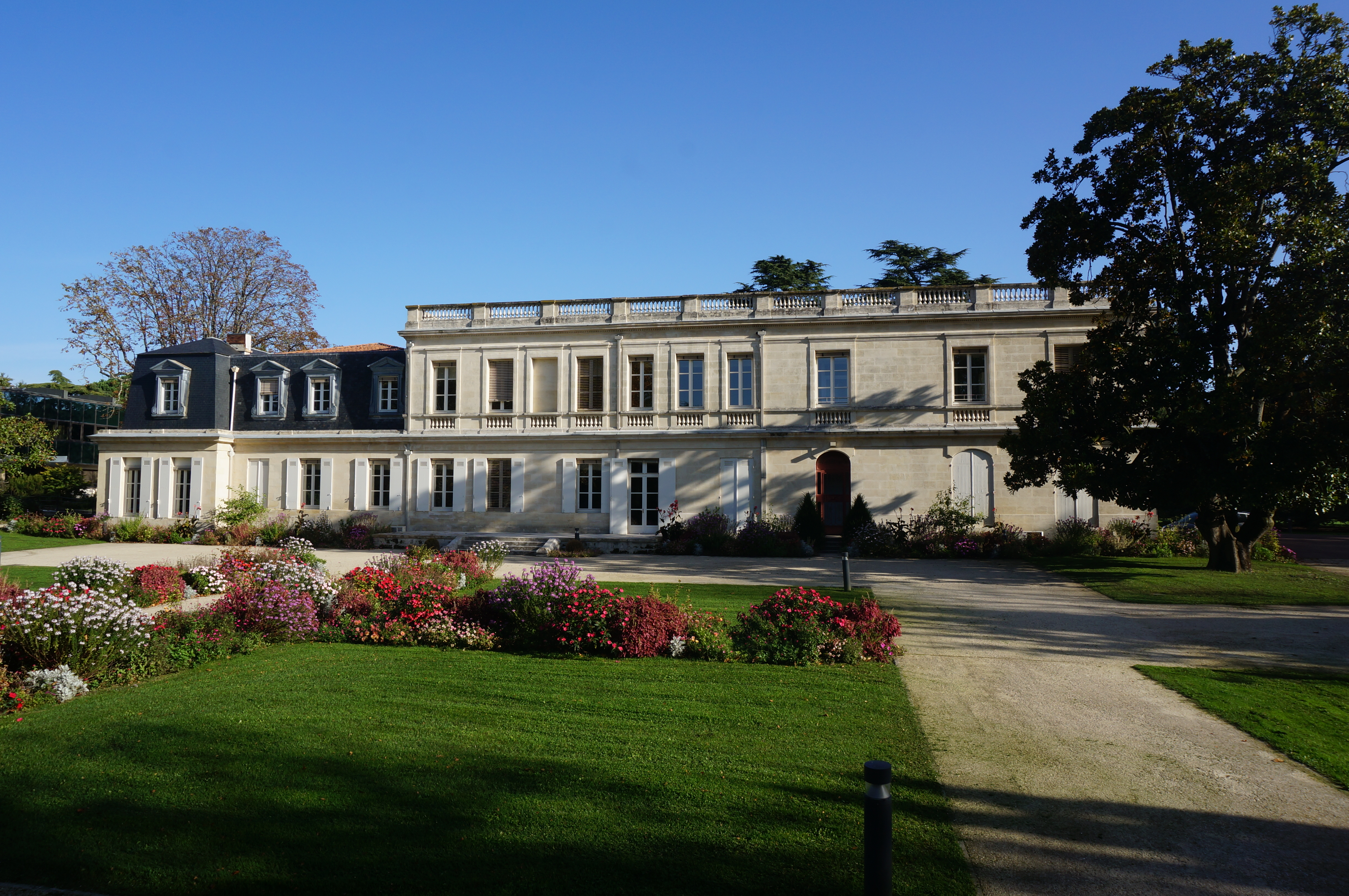
The Hôtel de Ville

The town council acquired the Château Le Vivier in 1972 and subsequently converted the main building for use as the Hôtel de Ville (town hall).

== Population ==
Historical population

Year	Pop.	±% p.a.
1793	2,511	—
1800	2,427	−0.48%
1806	3,039	+3.82%
1821	2,764	−0.63%
1831	3,097	+1.14%
1836	3,034	−0.41%
1841	3,276	+1.55%
1846	3,264	−0.07%
1851	3,648	+2.25%
1856	3,910	+1.40%
1861	4,284	+1.84%
1866	4,450	+0.76%
1872	4,265	−0.71%
1876	4,967	+3.88%
1881	5,162	+0.77%
1886	5,735	+2.13%
1891	6,159	+1.44%
1896	6,713	+1.74%
1901	7,052	+0.99%

Year	Pop.	±% p.a.
1906	7,421	+1.03%
1911	7,594	+0.46%
1921	9,515	+2.28%
1926	11,939	+4.64%
1931	15,363	+5.17%
1936	17,034	+2.09%
1946	21,417	+2.32%
1954	23,050	+0.92%
1962	32,355	+4.33%
1968	45,951	+6.02%
1975	50,652	+1.40%
1982	51,306	+0.18%
1990	57,273	+1.38%
1999	61,992	+0.88%
2007	66,002	+0.79%
2012	66,660	+0.20%
2017	70,105	+1.01%
2023	78,090	+1.81%

Source: EHESS and INSEE (1968-2023)

== Sights ==
- Tour de Veyrines : Veyrines Dungeon.
- Château Bourran : Bourran Castle
- Château Le Burck : Le Burck Castle
- Château or Maison Noble du Parc or d'Espagne : Parc Castle or Spain Castle
- Fontaine d'Arlac : Arlac Fountain
- Immeuble Gillet : Gillet Building
- La glacière : the icehouse
- La vieille église : the old Roman church
- Maison carrée d'Arlac : Peychotte's folly (Square House) in Arlac

=== Parks and gardens ===
- Parc de Bourran
- Bois du Burck : Burck wood
- Parc de Mérignac
- Parc Saint-Exupéry
- Parc du Vivier : the wood around the city hall

== Education ==
The commune has about 5,000 students in the primary and secondary schools in its city. Schools include:

- 15 public and private preschools
- 15 public and private elementary schools
- Four junior high schools: Collège de Bourran, Collège de Capeyron, Collège Jules-Ferry, Collège des Eyquems
- Two senior high schools: Lycée Fernand Daguin and Lycée professionnel Marcel Dassault

== Twin towns – sister cities ==
Mérignac is twinned with:

- Saint-Laurent, Quebec, Canada
- Kaolack, Senegal
- (Catalonia) Vilanova i la Geltrú, Spain

== See also ==
- Aéroport de Bordeaux Mérignac
- Communes of the Gironde department

== Notable inhabitants ==
- Albert Dupouy (1901 - 1973): player of rugby to death in Mérignac
- Jean Samazeuilh (1891 - 1965): French tennis player dead in Mérignac
- Nicolas Canteloup, born on 4 November 1963, in Mérignac in the Gironde, is a comedian, French imitator.
- Émile Rummelhardt, former professional player and French football coach.
- Robert Étienne (1921–2009): French historian of ancient Rome, was born in Mérignac.
