= Bordeaux =

Prefecture and commune in Nouvelle-Aquitaine, France

Bordeaux Bordèu (Occitan)
- Prefecture and commune
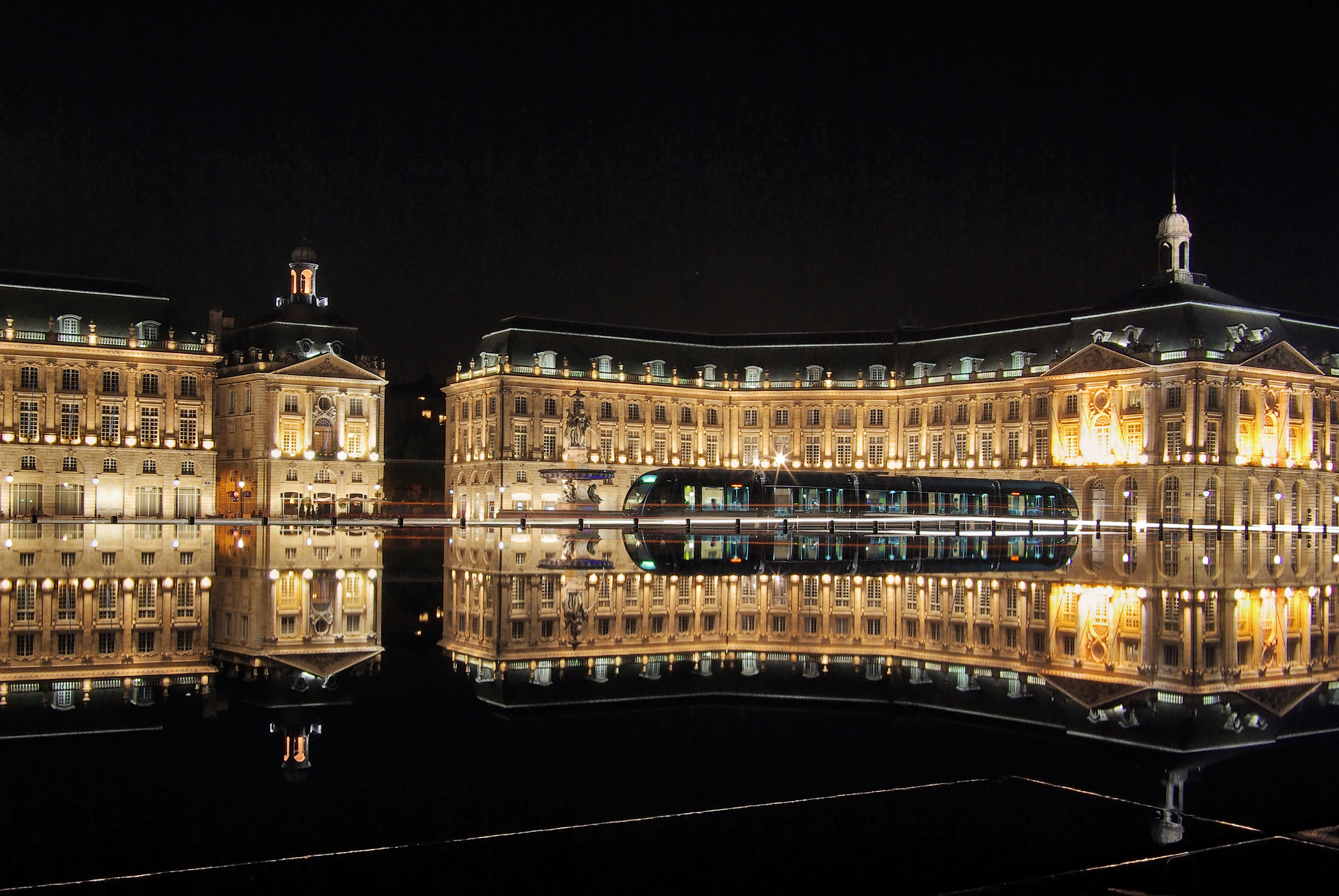
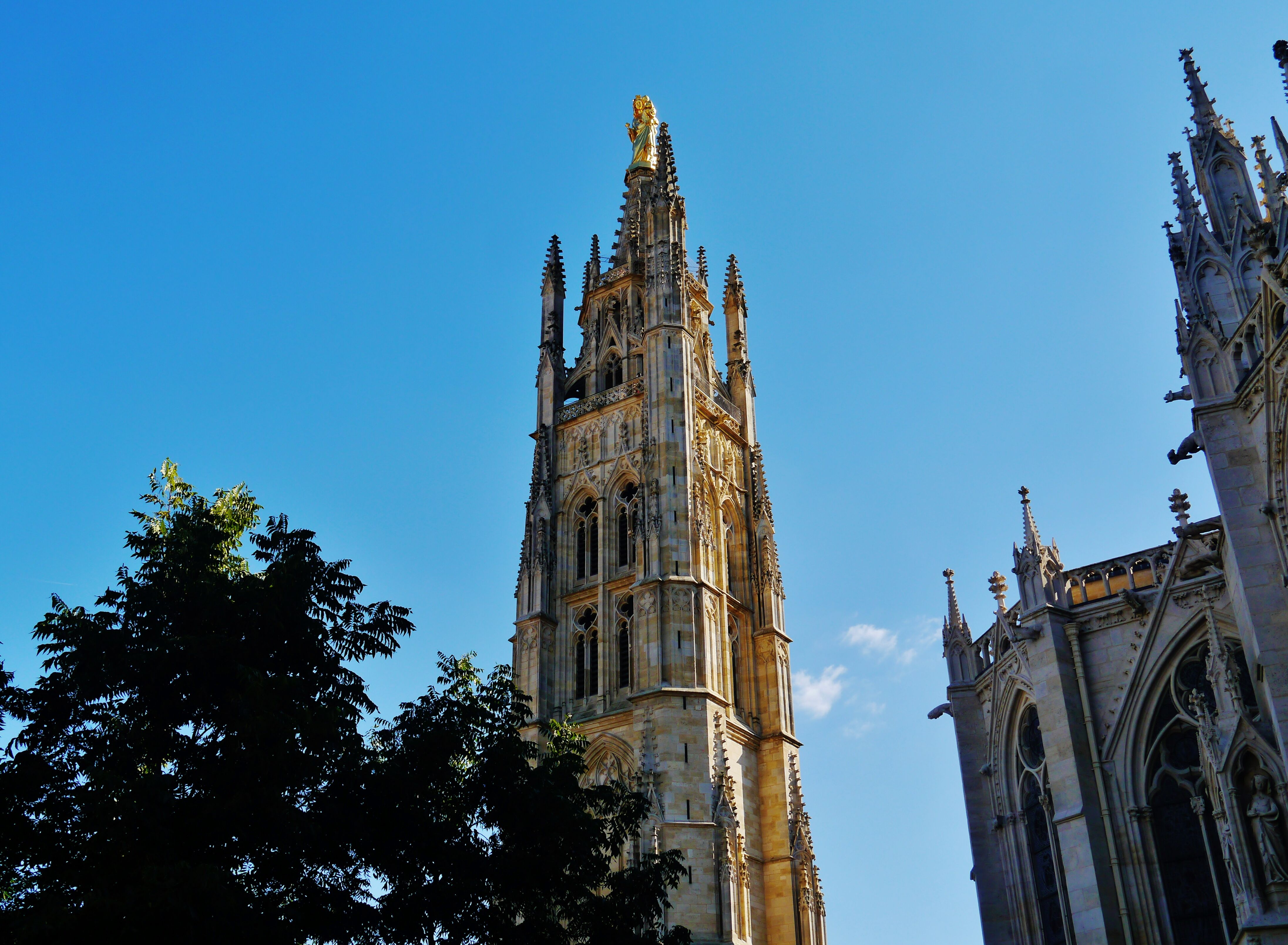
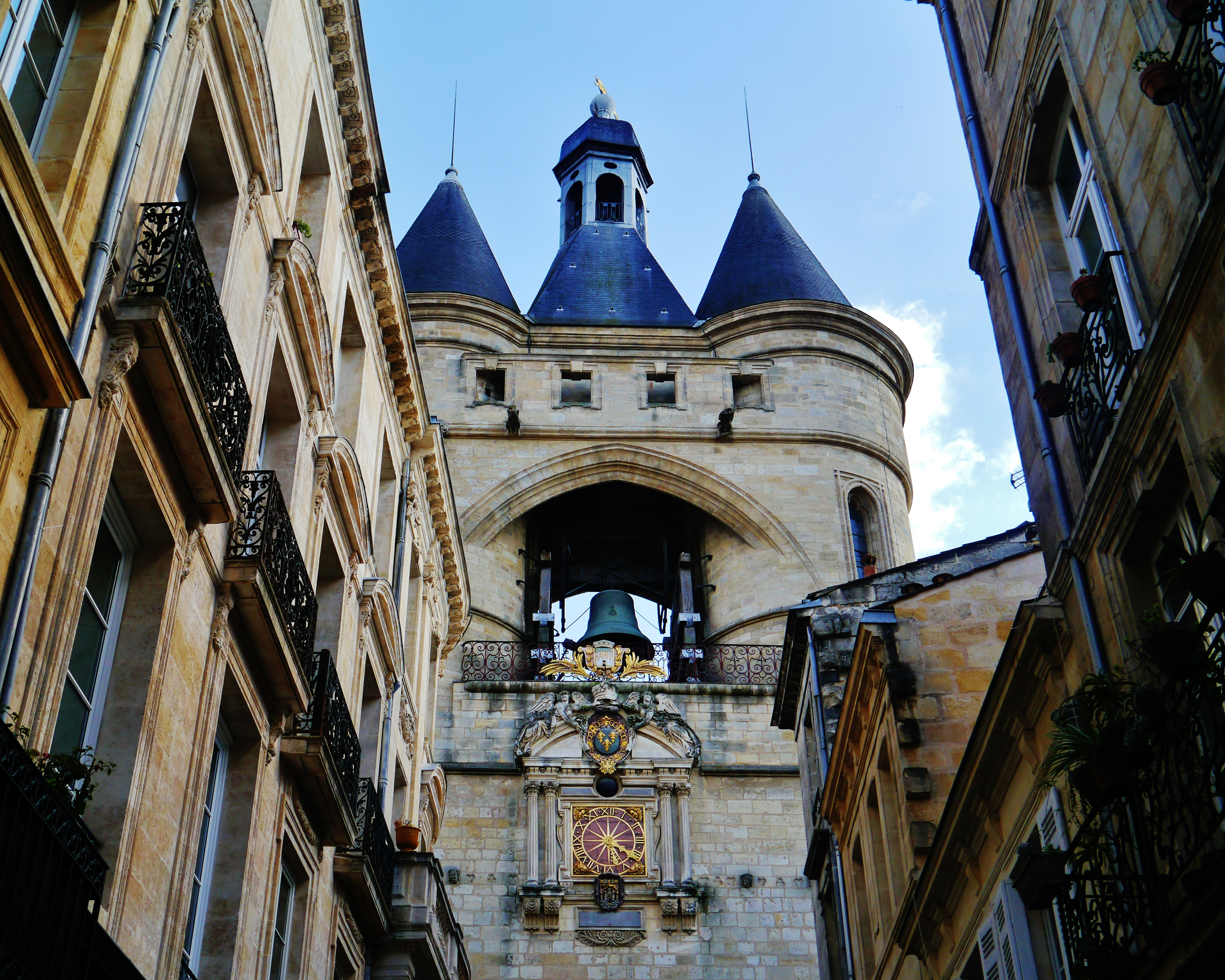
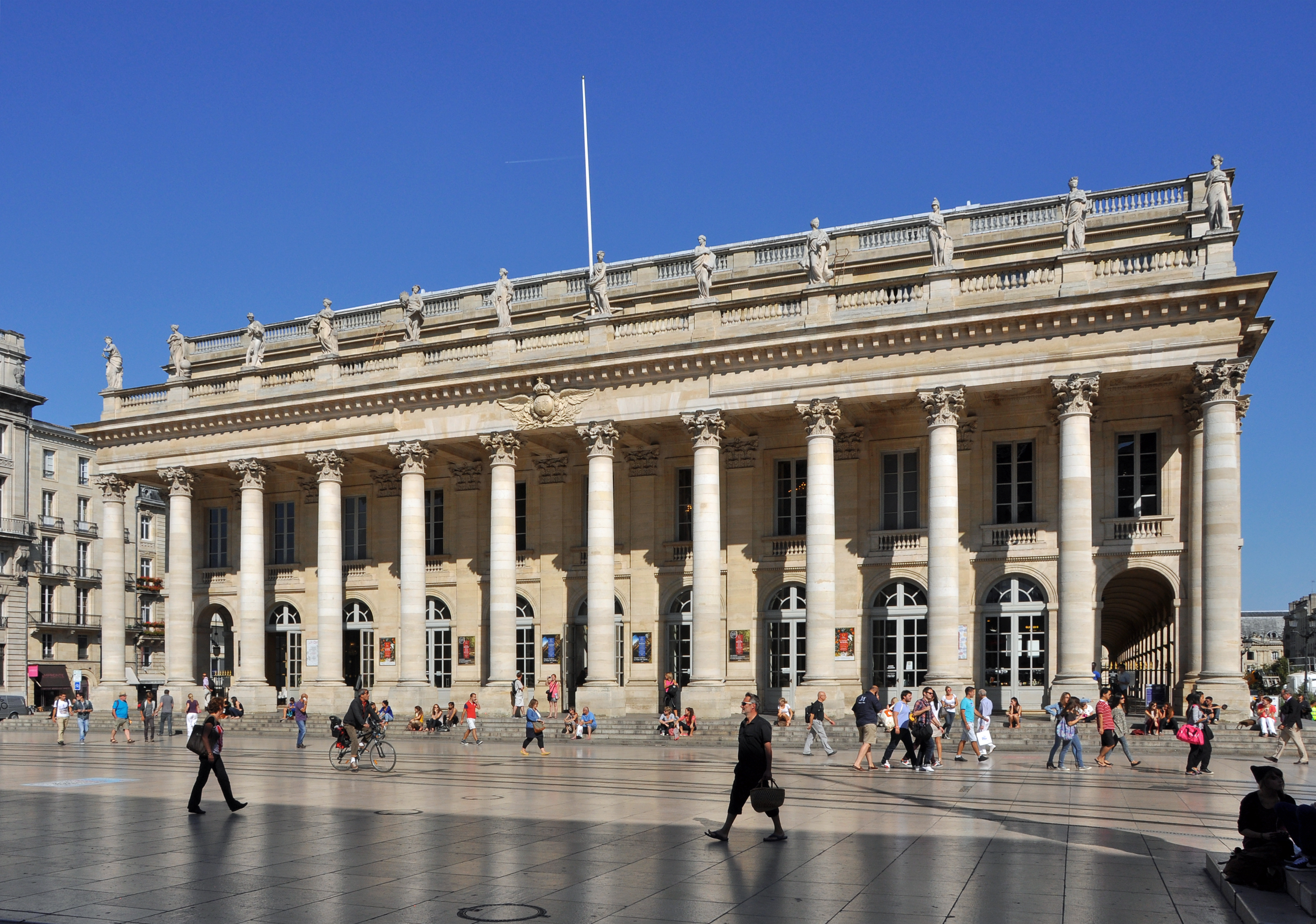
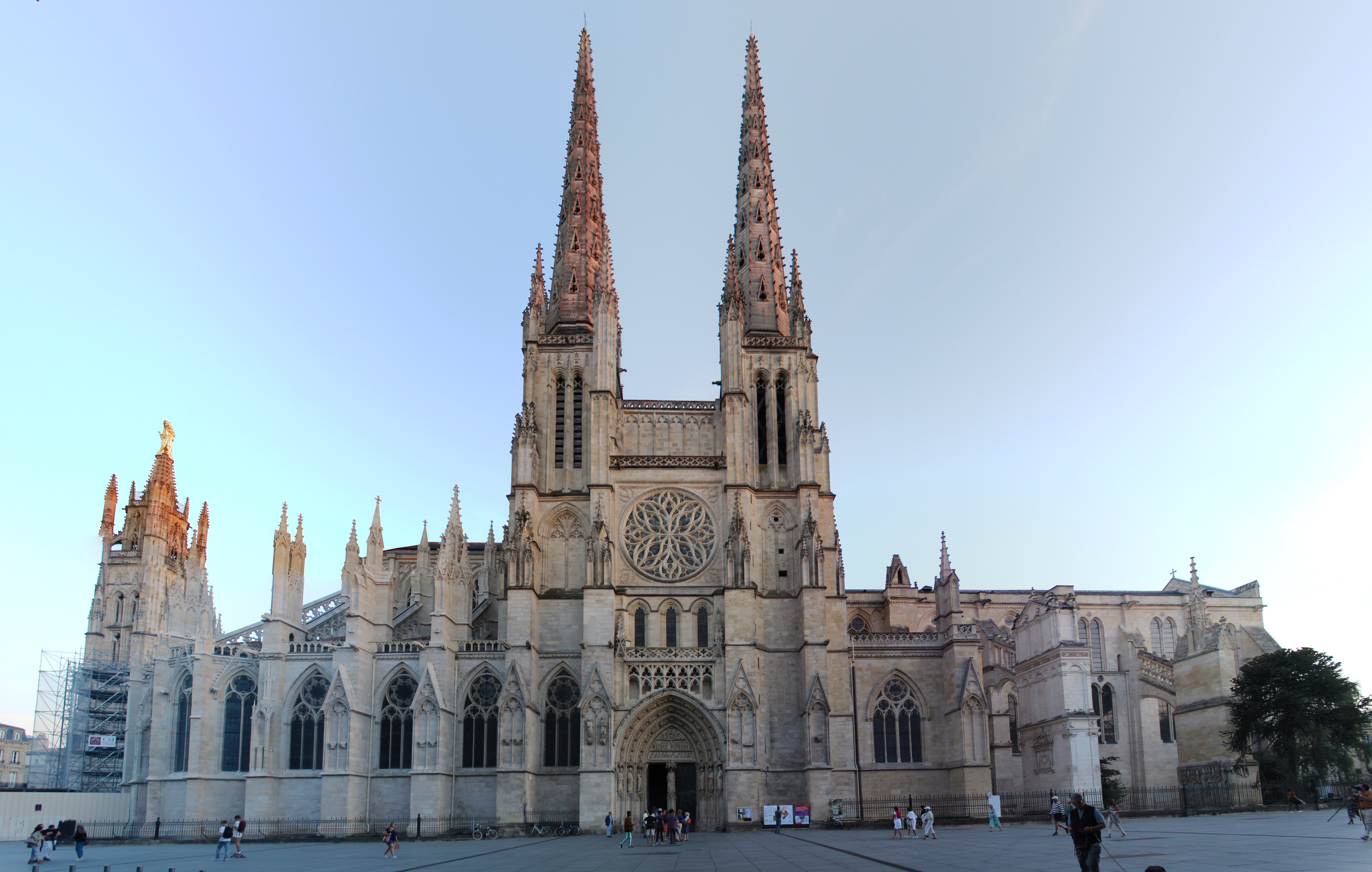
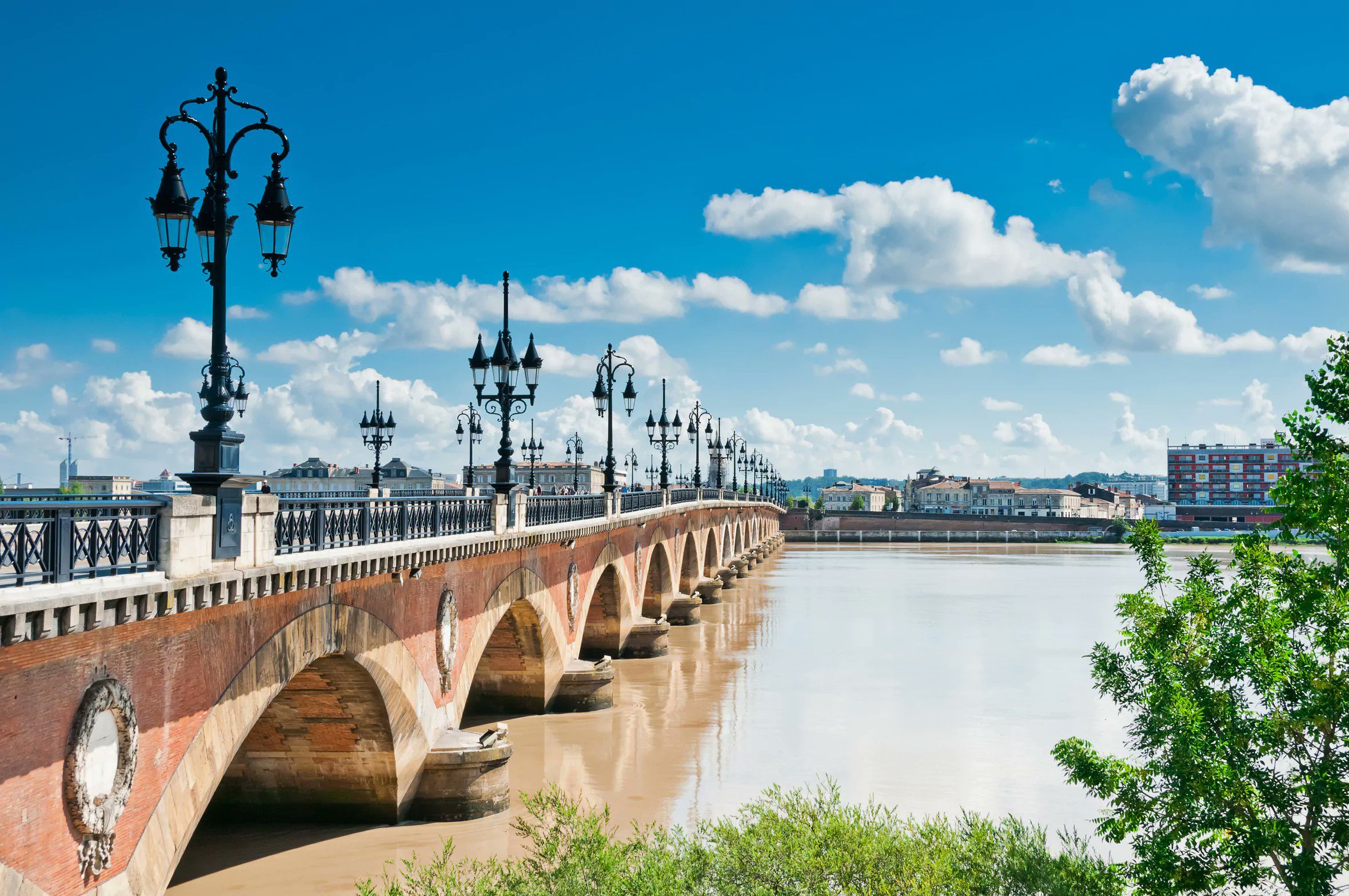
- Place de la Bourse Tour Pey-Berland Grosse Cloche Grand Théâtre Saint-André Cathedral Pont de Pierre on the Garonne

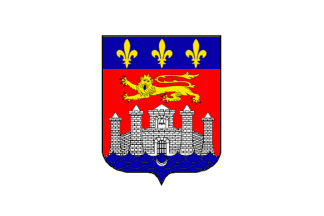
- Flag Coat of arms
- Motto: Lilia sola regunt lunam undas castra leonem. "The fleur-de-lis alone rules over the moon, the waves, the castle, and the lion" (in French: "Les lys règnent seuls sur la lune, les ondes, la forteresse et le lion.")
- Location of Bordeaux
- Location within France Location within Nouvelle-Aquitaine
- Coordinates: 44°50′N 0°35′W
- Country: France
- Region: Nouvelle-Aquitaine
- Department: Gironde
- Arrondissement: Bordeaux
- Canton: 5 cantons
- Intercommunality: Bordeaux Métropole

Government
  - Mayor (2026–32): Thomas Cazenave (RE)
- Area^{1}: 49.36 km^{2} (19.06 sq mi)
  - Urban (2020): 1,287.3 km^{2} (497.0 sq mi)
  - Metro (2020): 6,315.6 km^{2} (2,438.5 sq mi)
- Population (2023): 267,991
  - Rank: 9th in France
  - Density: 5,429/km^{2} (14,060/sq mi)
  - Urban (2023): 1,034,027
  - Urban density: 803.25/km^{2} (2,080.4/sq mi)
  - Metro (2023): 1,426,278
  - Metro density: 225.83/km^{2} (584.91/sq mi)
- Demonym: French: Bordelais(e)
- Time zone: UTC+01:00 (CET)
  - Summer (DST): UTC+02:00 (CEST)
- INSEE/Postal code: 33063 /
- Website: www.bordeaux.fr

UNESCO World Heritage Site
- Official name: Bordeaux, Port of the Moon
- Criteria: Cultural: ii, iv
- Reference: 1256
- Inscription: 2007 (31st Session)
- Area: 1,731 ha (4,280 acres)
- Buffer zone: 11,974 ha (29,590 acres)
- ^{1} French Land Register data, which excludes lakes, ponds, glaciers > 1 km^{2} (0.386 sq mi or 247 acres) and river estuaries.

Bordeaux (/bɔːrˈdoʊ/ bor-DOH; French: [bɔʁdo]; Gascon Occitan: Bordèu [buɾˈðɛw]; Basque: Bordele) is a city on the river Garonne in the Gironde department, southwestern France. A port city, it is the capital of the Nouvelle-Aquitaine region, as well as the prefecture of the Gironde department. Its inhabitants are called "Bordelais" (masculine) or "Bordelaises" (feminine). The term "Bordelais" may also refer to the city and its surrounding region.

The city of Bordeaux proper had a population of 267,991 in 2023 within its small municipal territory of 49 km^{2} (19 sq mi), but together with its suburbs and exurbs the Bordeaux metropolitan area had a population of 1,426,278 (2023), the sixth-most populous in France after Paris, Lyon, Marseille, Lille, and Toulouse.

Bordeaux and 27 suburban municipalities form the Bordeaux Metropolis, an indirectly elected metropolitan authority now in charge of wider metropolitan issues. The Bordeaux Metropolis, with a population of 854,334 at the 2023 census, is the fifth most populated metropolitan council in France after those of Paris, Marseille, Lyon and Lille.

Bordeaux is a world capital of wine: many châteaux and vineyards stand on the hillsides of the Gironde, and the city is home to the world's main wine fair, Vinexpo. Bordeaux is also one of the centers of gastronomy and business tourism for the organization of international congresses. It is a central and strategic hub for the aeronautics, military and space sector, home to major companies such as Dassault Aviation, ArianeGroup, Safran and Thales. The link with aviation dates back to 1910, the year the first airplane flew over the city. A crossroads of knowledge through university research, it is home to one of the only two megajoule lasers in the world, as well as a university population of more than 130,000 students within the Bordeaux Metropolis.

Bordeaux is an international tourist destination for its architectural and cultural heritage with more than 362 historic monuments, making it, after Paris, the city with the most listed or registered monuments in France. The city, known as the "Pearl of Aquitaine", was voted European Destination of the year in a 2015 online poll. The metropolis has also received awards and rankings by international organizations such as the 1957 Europe Prize for its efforts in transmitting the European ideal.

In June 2007, the Port of the Moon in historic Bordeaux was inscribed on the UNESCO World Heritage List, for its outstanding architecture and urban ensemble and in recognition of Bordeaux's international importance over the last 2000 years. Bordeaux is also ranked as a Sufficiency city by the Globalization and World Cities Research Network.

== History ==
=== 5th century BC to 11th century AD ===
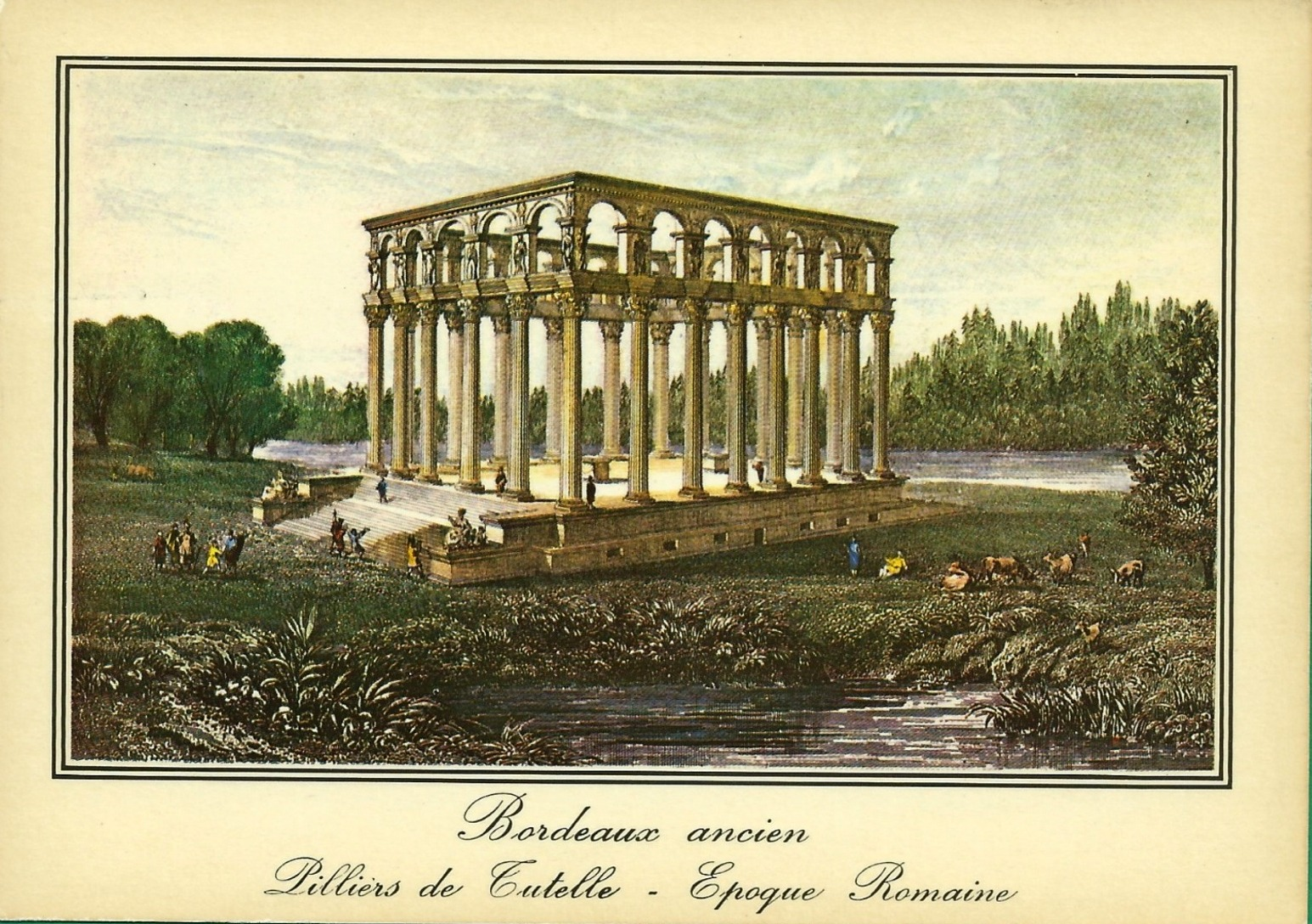
Les Piliers de Tutelle

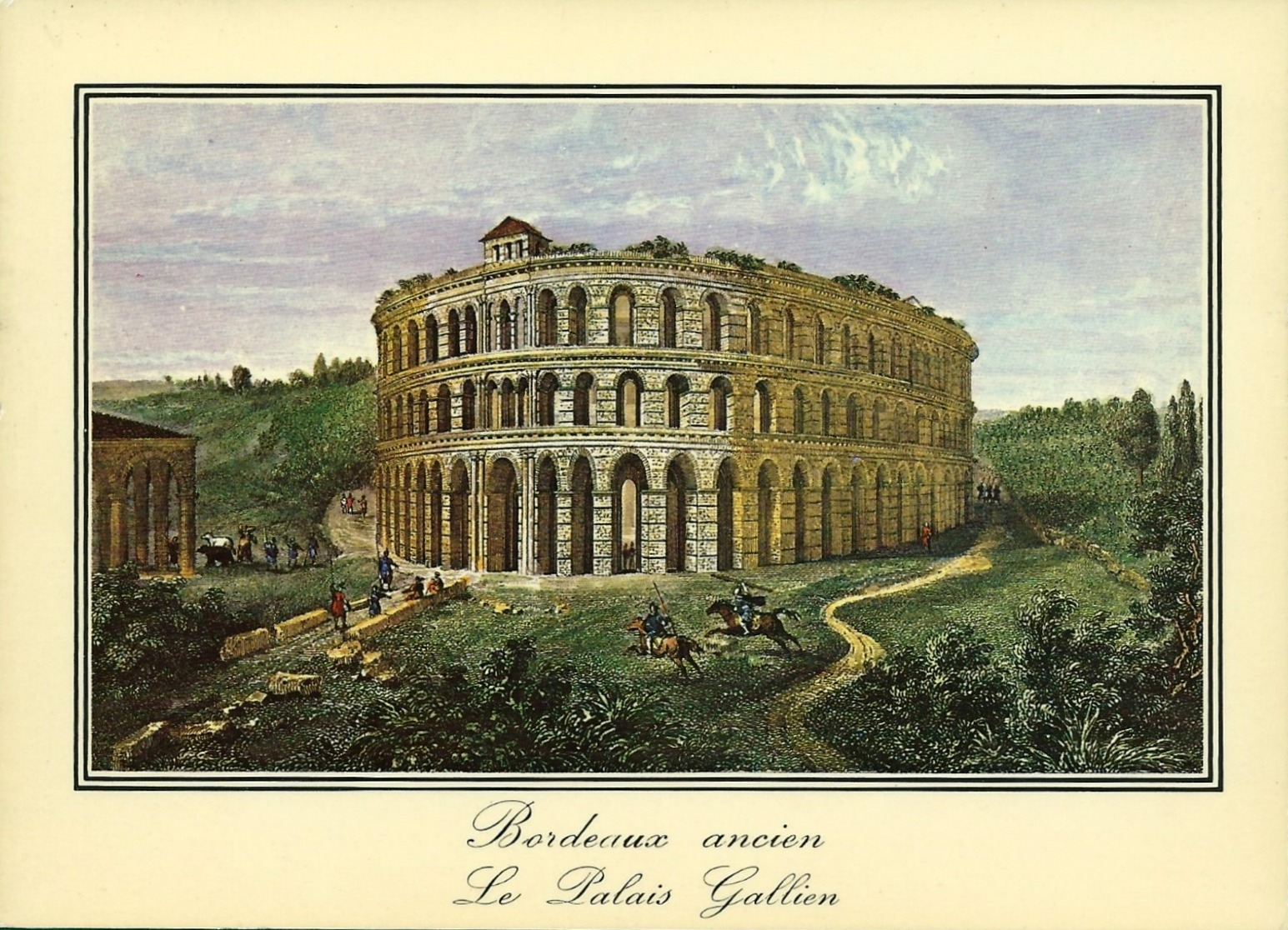
The Roman amphitheatre

Around 300 BC, the region was the settlement of a Celtic tribe, the Bituriges Vivisci, who named the town Burdigala, probably of Aquitanian origin.

In 107 BC, the Battle of Burdigala was fought by the Romans who were defending the Allobroges, a Gallic tribe allied to Rome, and the Tigurini led by Divico. The Romans were defeated and their commander, the consul Lucius Cassius Longinus, was killed in battle.

The city came under Roman rule around 60 BC, and it became an important commercial centre for tin and lead. During this period the amphitheatre and the monument Les Piliers de Tutelle were built.

In 276 AD, it was sacked by the Vandals. The Vandals attacked again in 409, followed by the Visigoths in 414, and the Franks in 498, and afterwards the city fell into a period of relative obscurity.

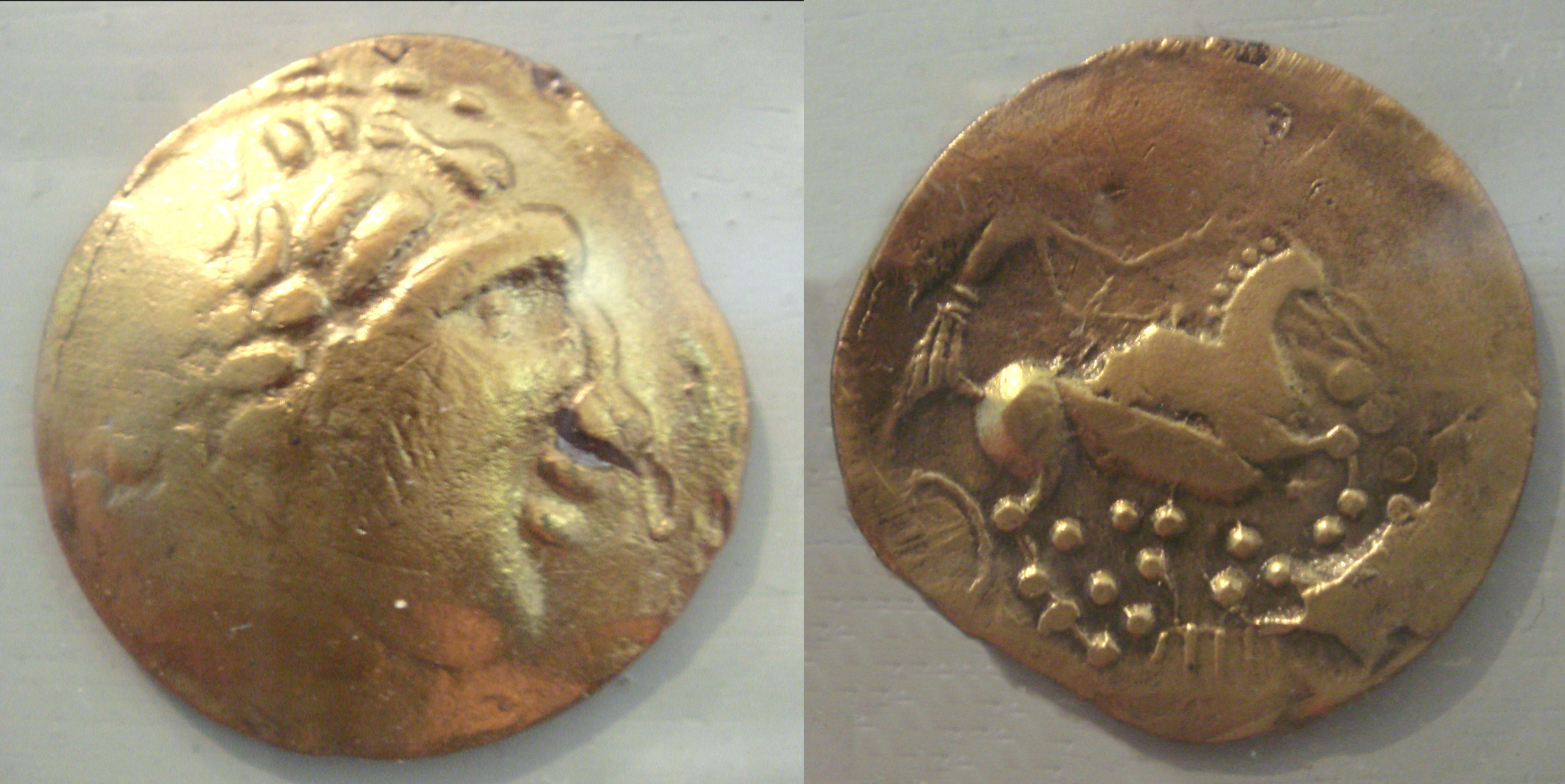
Coins of the Bituriges Vivisci, 5th–1st century BC, derived from the coin designs of Greeks in pre-Roman Gaul. Cabinet des Médailles.

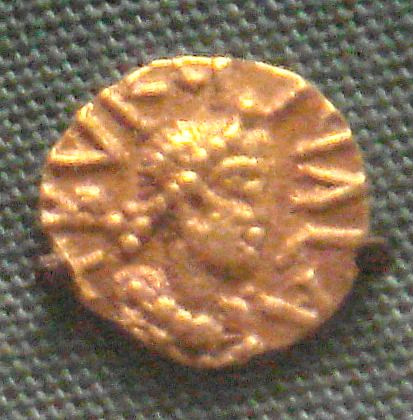
Merovingian tremisses minted in Bordeaux by the Church of Saint-Étienne, late sixth century. British Museum.

In the late 6th century AD the city re-emerged as the seat of a county and an archdiocese within the Merovingian kingdom of the Franks, but royal Frankish power was never strong. The city started to play a regional role as a major urban center on the fringes of the newly founded Frankish Duchy of Vasconia. Around 585 Gallactorius was made Count of Bordeaux and fought the Basques.

In 732, the city was plundered by the troops of Abd er Rahman who stormed the fortifications and overwhelmed the Aquitanian garrison. Duke Eudes mustered a force to engage the Umayyads, eventually engaging them in the Battle of the River Garonne somewhere near the river Dordogne. The battle had a high death toll, and although Eudes was defeated he had enough troops to engage in the Battle of Poitiers and so retain his grip on Aquitaine.

In 737, following his father Eudes's death, the Aquitanian duke Hunald led a rebellion to which Charles responded by launching an expedition that captured Bordeaux. However, it was not retained for long; during the following year the Frankish commander clashed in battle with the Aquitanians but then left to take on hostile Burgundian authorities and magnates. In 745 Aquitaine faced another expedition where Charles's sons Pepin and Carloman challenged Hunald's power and defeated him. Hunald's son Waifer replaced him and confirmed Bordeaux as the capital city (along with Bourges in the north).

During the last stage of the war against Aquitaine (760–768), it was one of Waifer's last important strongholds to fall to the troops of King Pepin the Short. Charlemagne built the fortress of Fronsac (Frontiacus, Franciacus) near Bordeaux on a hill across the border with the Basques (Wascones), where Basque commanders came and pledged their loyalty (769).

In 778, Seguin (or Sihimin) was appointed count of Bordeaux, probably undermining the power of the Duke Lupo, and possibly leading to the Battle of Roncevaux Pass. In 814, Seguin was made Duke of Vasconia, but was deposed in 816 for failing to suppress a Basque rebellion. Under the Carolingians, sometimes the Counts of Bordeaux held the title concomitantly with that of Duke of Vasconia. They were to keep the Basques in check and defend the mouth of the Garonne from the Vikings when they appeared in c. 844. In Autumn 845, the Vikings were raiding Bordeaux and Saintes; count Seguin II marched on them but was captured and executed.

Although the port of Bordeaux was a buzzing trade center, the stability and success of the city were threatened by Viking and Norman incursions and political instability. The restoration of the Ramnulfid Dukes of Aquitaine under William IV and his successors (known as the House of Poitiers) brought continuity of government.

=== 12th century to 15th century, the English era ===
From the 12th to the 15th century, Bordeaux flourished once more following the marriage of Eléonore, Duchess of Aquitaine and the last of the House of Poitiers, to Henry II Plantagenêt, Count of Anjou and the grandson of Henry I of England, who succeeded to the English crown months after their wedding, bringing into being the vast Angevin Empire, which stretched from the Pyrenees to Ireland. After granting a tax-free trade status with England, Henry was adored by the locals as they could be even more profitable in the wine trade, their main source of income, and the city benefited from imports of cloth and wheat. The belfry (Grosse Cloche) and city cathedral St-André were built, the latter in 1227, incorporating the artisan quarter of Saint-Paul. Under the terms of the Treaty of Brétigny it became briefly the capital of an independent state (1362–1372) under Edward, the Black Prince, but after the Battle of Castillon (1453) it was annexed by France.

=== 15th century to 17th century ===
In 1462, Bordeaux created a local parliament.

Bordeaux adhered to the Fronde, being effectively annexed to the Kingdom of France only in 1653, when the army of Louis XIV entered the city.

=== 18th century, the golden era ===
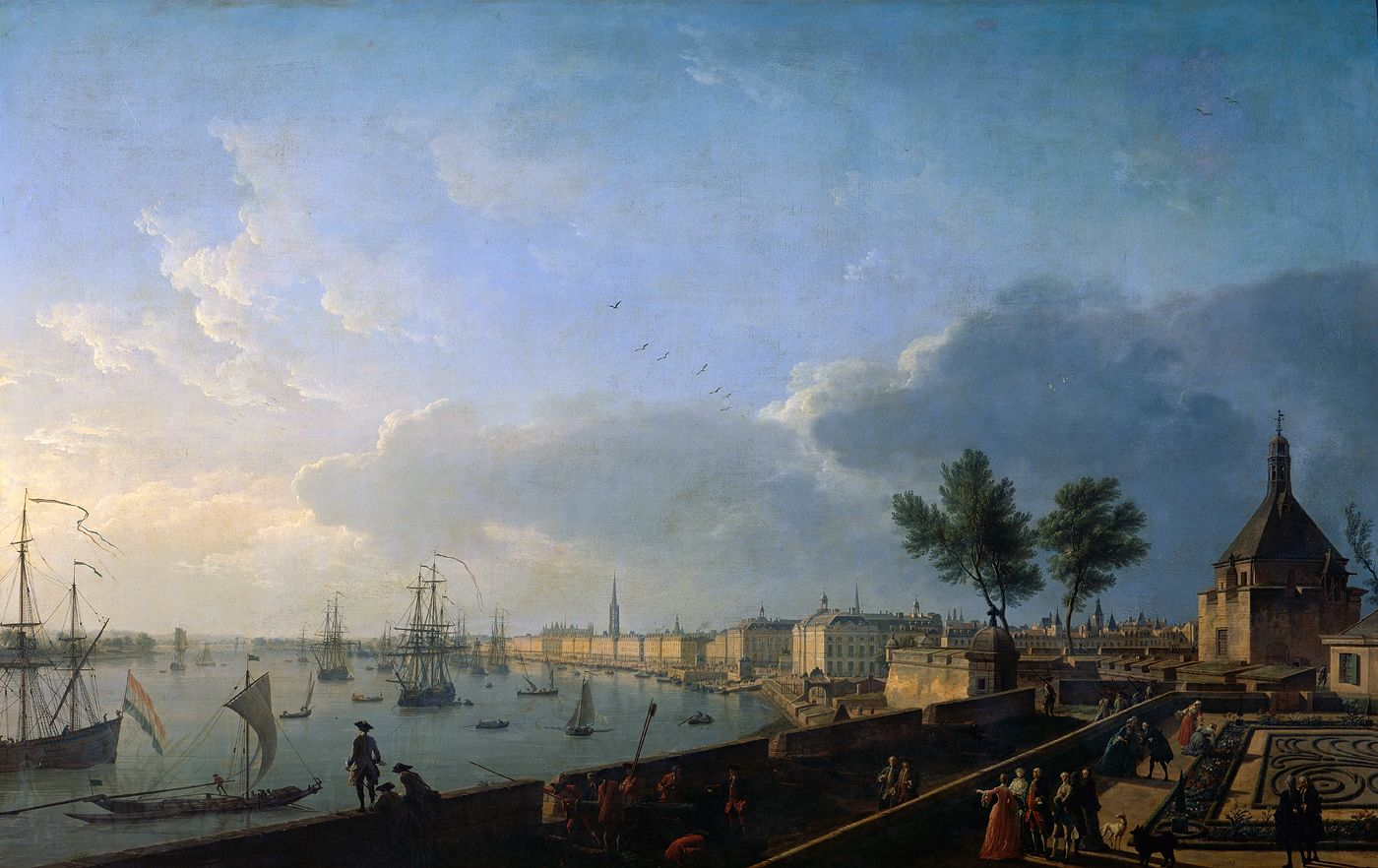
Port of the Moon in 1759

The 18th century saw another golden age of Bordeaux. The Port of the Moon supplied the majority of Europe with coffee, cocoa, sugar, cotton and indigo, becoming France's busiest port and the second busiest port in the world after London. Many of the buildings in the centre of Bordeaux (probably as many as 5,000), including those on the quays, are from this period.

Bordeaux was also a major trading centre for slaves. In total, the Bordeaux shipowners deported 150,000 Africans in some 500 expeditions.

=== French Revolution: political disruption and loss of the most profitable colony ===
At the beginning of the French Revolution (1789), many local revolutionaries were members of the Girondists. This Party represented the provincial bourgeoisie, favorable towards abolishing aristocratic privileges, but opposed to the Revolution's social dimension. The Gironde valley's economic value and significance was satiated by the city's commercial power which was in dire contrast to the emerging widespread poverty affecting its inhabitants. Trade and commerce were the driving factors in the region's economic prosperity, still this resulted in a significant number of locals struggling to survive on a daily basis due to lack of food and resources. This socioeconomic disparity served as fertile ground for discontent, sparking frequent episodes of mass unrest well before the tumultuous events of 1783.

In 1793, the Montagnards led by Robespierre and Marat came to power. Fearing a bourgeois misappropriation of the Revolution, they executed a great number of Girondists. During the purge, the local Montagnard Section renamed the city of Bordeaux "Commune-Franklin" (Franklin-municipality) in homage to Benjamin Franklin.

At the same time, in 1791, a slave revolt broke out at Saint-Domingue (current Haiti), the most profitable of the French colonies. In the lively era of the 18th century, Bordeaux emerged as a center of economic activity, particularly known at first for its successful wine trade. The city's placement along the Gironde River was very strategic, helping to facilitate the transportation of produce to markets both internationally and domestically, which led to an increase in exports and Bordeaux's economic prosperity. There was a significant transformation to the economic landscape of Bordeaux in 1785, which was spurred by the attraction of large profits, traders and merchants in Bordeaux began to turn their attention to the slave trade. This was a very important moment in the city's economic history seeing as it diversified its commercial expansion, at a serious moral cost. This introduced a new layer of difficulty to Bordeaux's economic activities. Even though it brought along significant wealth to certain segments of society, it complicated the socio-economic inconsistencies within the region. The entry into the slave trade brought even more tension within Bordeaux society. The trade exacerbated the divide between an elite with growing wealth and those living in poverty. This economic divide laid out the foundation for the mass unrest that would break out in the French Revolution.

Three years later, the Montagnard Convention abolished slavery. In 1802, Napoleon revoked the manumission law but lost the war against the army of former slaves. In 1804, Haiti became independent. The loss of this "Pearl" of the West Indies generated the collapse of Bordeaux's port economy, which was dependent on the colonial trade and trade in slaves.

Towards the end of the Peninsular War of 1814, the Duke of Wellington sent William Beresford with two divisions and seized Bordeaux, encountering little resistance. Bordeaux was largely anti-Bonapartist and the majority supported the Bourbons. The British troops were treated as liberators. Distinguished historian of the French revolution Suzanne Desan explains that "examining intricate local dynamics" is essential to studying the Revolution by region.

=== 19th century, rebirth of the economy ===
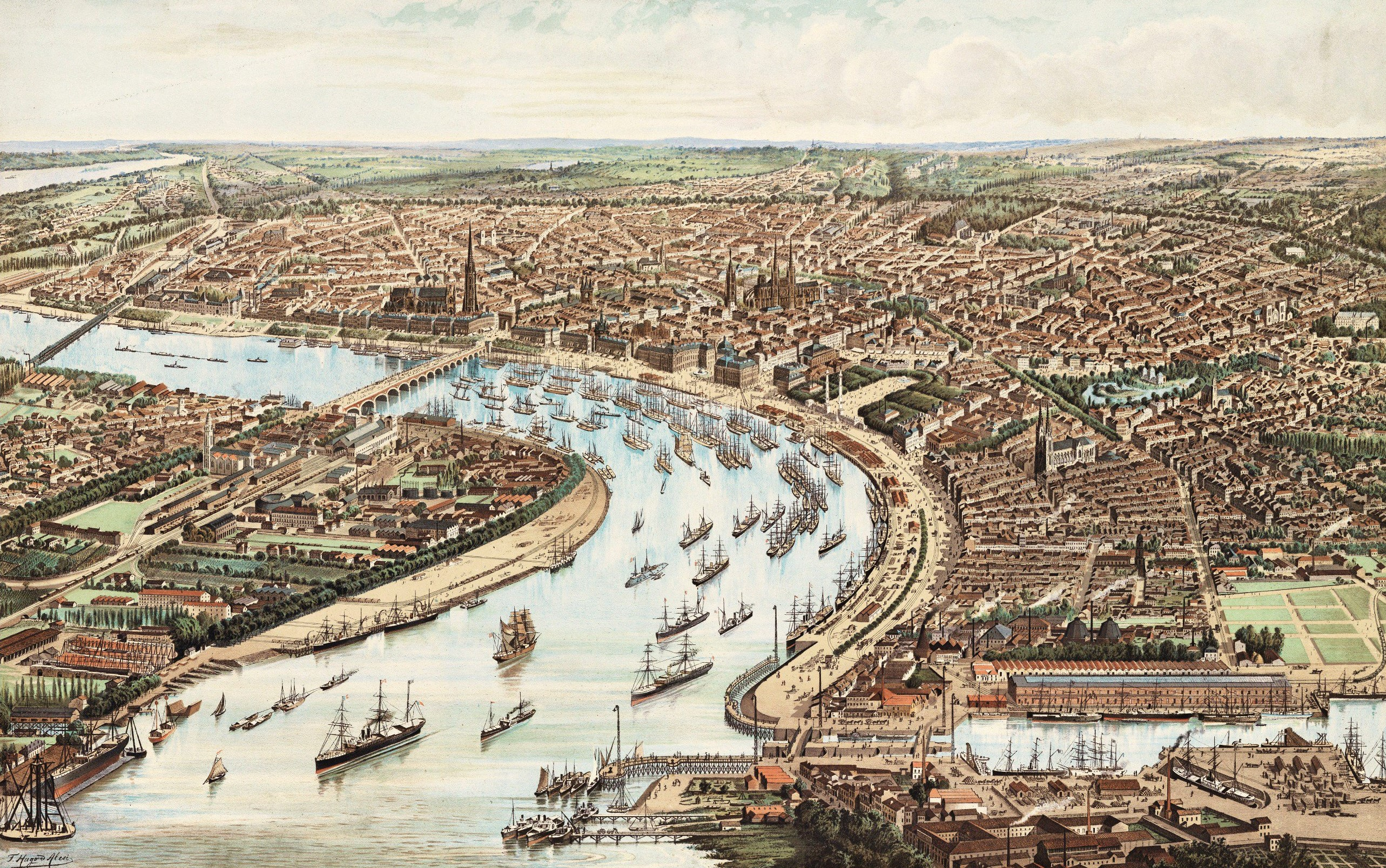
Aerial view of the Port of the Moon in 1899

From the Bourbon Restoration, the economy of Bordeaux was rebuilt by traders and shipowners. They engaged to construct the first bridge of Bordeaux, and customs warehouses. The shipping traffic grew through the new African colonies.

Georges-Eugène Haussmann, a longtime prefect of Bordeaux, used Bordeaux's 18th-century large-scale rebuilding as a model when he was asked by Emperor Napoleon III to transform the quasi-medieval Paris into a "modern" capital that would make France proud. Victor Hugo found the town so beautiful he said: "Take Versailles, add Antwerp, and you have Bordeaux".

In 1870, at the beginning of the Franco-Prussian war against Prussia, the French government temporarily relocated to Bordeaux from Paris. That recurred during World War I and again very briefly during World War II, when it became clear that Paris would fall into German hands.

=== 20th century ===
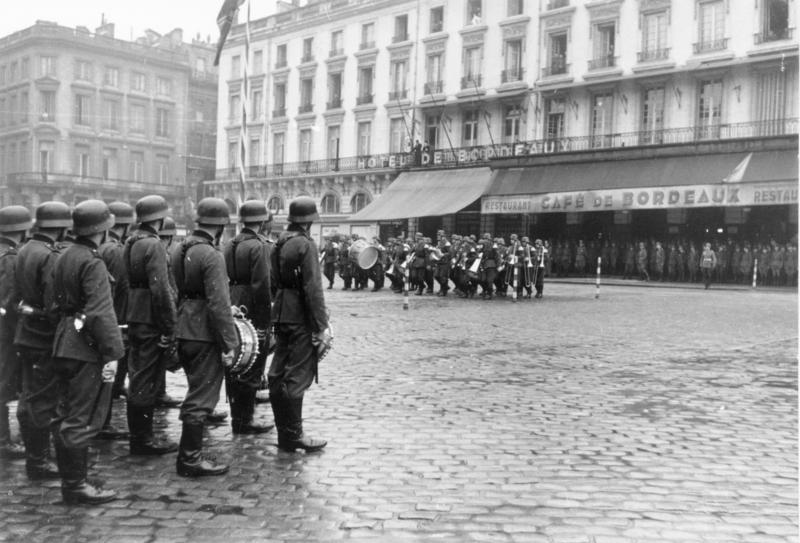
The Place de la Comédie during the German occupation

During World War II, Bordeaux fell under German occupation.

In May and June 1940, Bordeaux was the site of the life-saving actions of the Portuguese consul-general, Aristides de Sousa Mendes, who granted thousands of Portuguese visas, which were needed to pass the Spanish border, to refugees fleeing the German occupation.

From 1941 to 1943, the Italian Royal Navy established BETASOM, a submarine base at Bordeaux. Italian submarines participated in the Battle of the Atlantic from that base, which was also a major base for German U-boats as headquarters of 12th U-boat Flotilla. The massive, reinforced concrete U-boat pens have proved impractical to demolish and are now partly used as a cultural center for exhibitions.

=== 21st century, listed as World heritage ===
In 2007, 40% of the city surface area, located around the Port of the Moon, was listed as World Heritage Site. UNESCO inscribed Bordeaux as "an inhabited historic city, an outstanding urban and architectural ensemble, created in the age of the Enlightenment, whose values continued up to the first half of the 20th century, with more protected buildings than any other French city except Paris".

== Geography ==
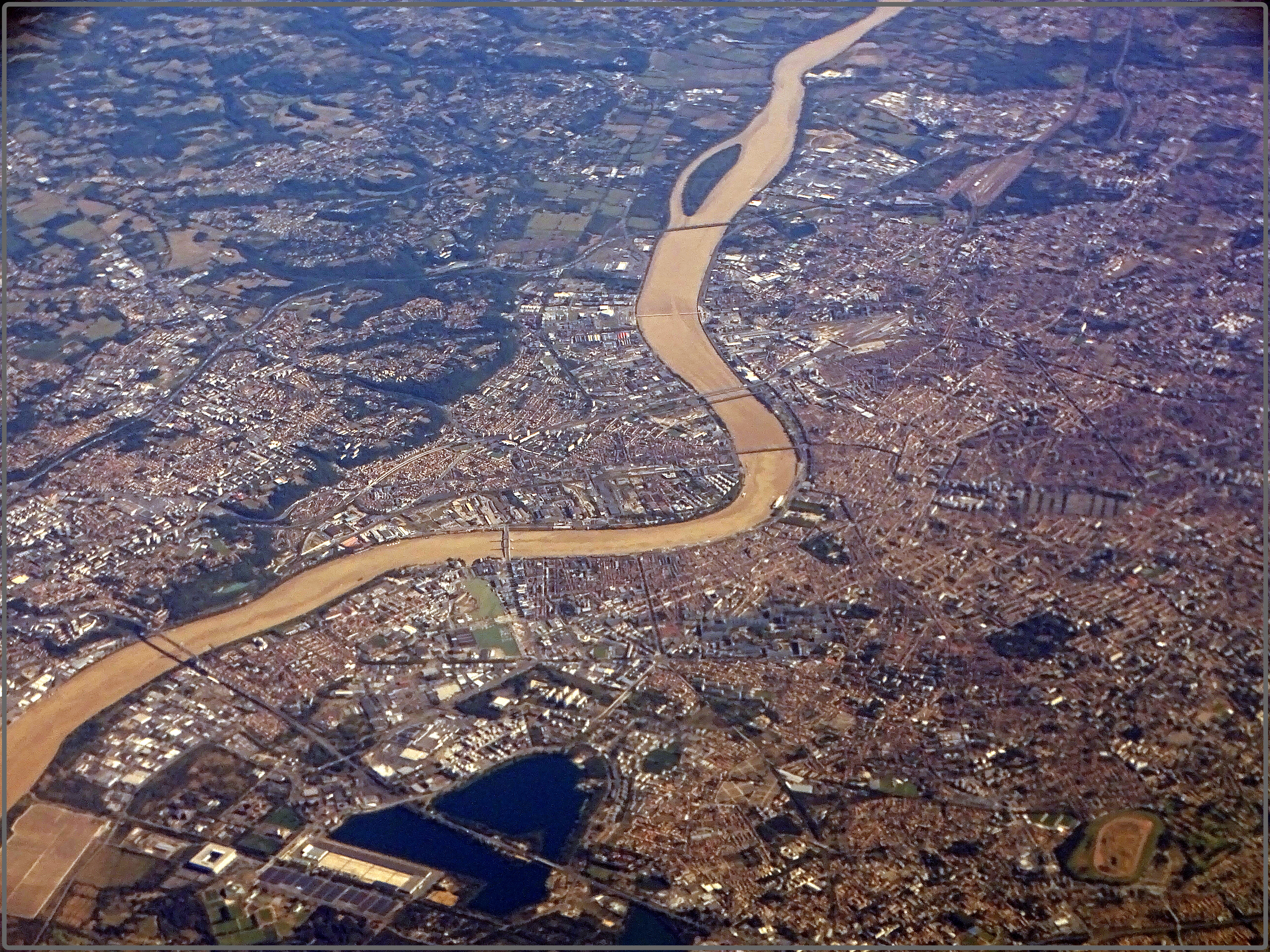
Aerial view of the Garonne in Bordeaux in 2019

Bordeaux is located close to the European Atlantic coast, in the southwest of France and in the north of the Aquitaine region. It is around 500 km (310 mi) southwest of Paris. The city is built on a bend of the river Garonne, and is divided into two parts: the right bank to the east and left bank in the west. Historically the left bank is more developed because when flowing outside the bend, the water makes a furrow of the required depth to allow the passing of merchant ships, which used to offload on this side of the river. But, today, the right bank is developing, including new urban projects. In Bordeaux, the Garonne River is accessible to ocean liners through the Gironde estuary. The right bank of the Garonne is a low-lying, often marshy plain.

=== Climate ===
Bordeaux's climate can be classified as oceanic (Köppen climate classification Cfb), bordering on a humid subtropical climate (Cfa). However, the Trewartha climate classification system classifies the city as solely humid subtropical, due to a recent rise in temperatures related – to some degree or another – to climate change and the city's urban heat island.

The city enjoys cool to mild, wet winters, due to its relatively southerly latitude, and the prevalence of mild, westerly winds from the Atlantic. Its summers are warm and somewhat drier, although wet enough to avoid a Mediterranean classification. Frosts occur annually, but snowfall is quite infrequent, occurring for no more than 3–4 days a year. The summer of 2003 set a record with an average temperature of 23.3 °C (73.9 °F), while February 1956 was the coldest month on record with an average temperature of −2.0 °C (28.4 °F) at Bordeaux–Mérignac Airport.

Climate data for Bordeaux - Mérignac (BOD), elevation: 47 m (154 ft) (1991-2020 normals, extremes 1920-present)
Month	Jan	Feb	Mar	Apr	May	Jun	Jul	Aug	Sep	Oct	Nov	Dec	Year
Record high °C (°F)	20.8 (69.4)	26.2 (79.2)	27.7 (81.9)	31.1 (88.0)	36.6 (97.9)	42.5 (108.5)	41.2 (106.2)	41.6 (106.9)	37.5 (99.5)	33.2 (91.8)	26.7 (80.1)	22.5 (72.5)	42.5 (108.5)
Mean daily maximum °C (°F)	10.5 (50.9)	12.0 (53.6)	15.5 (59.9)	18.0 (64.4)	21.7 (71.1)	25.0 (77.0)	27.1 (80.8)	27.6 (81.7)	24.2 (75.6)	19.6 (67.3)	14.1 (57.4)	11.0 (51.8)	18.9 (66.0)
Daily mean °C (°F)	7.1 (44.8)	7.8 (46.0)	10.7 (51.3)	13.0 (55.4)	16.6 (61.9)	19.8 (67.6)	21.7 (71.1)	21.9 (71.4)	18.8 (65.8)	15.2 (59.4)	10.4 (50.7)	7.7 (45.9)	14.2 (57.6)
Mean daily minimum °C (°F)	3.7 (38.7)	3.6 (38.5)	5.8 (42.4)	8.0 (46.4)	11.4 (52.5)	14.6 (58.3)	16.2 (61.2)	16.3 (61.3)	13.3 (55.9)	10.7 (51.3)	6.7 (44.1)	4.4 (39.9)	9.6 (49.3)
Record low °C (°F)	−16.4 (2.5)	−14.8 (5.4)	−9.9 (14.2)	−5.3 (22.5)	−1.8 (28.8)	2.5 (36.5)	5.2 (41.4)	4.7 (40.5)	−1.8 (28.8)	−5.3 (22.5)	−7.3 (18.9)	−13.4 (7.9)	−16.4 (2.5)
Average precipitation mm (inches)	86.9 (3.42)	66.9 (2.63)	63.3 (2.49)	75.6 (2.98)	71.1 (2.80)	70.4 (2.77)	48.6 (1.91)	56.7 (2.23)	81.2 (3.20)	83.3 (3.28)	114.5 (4.51)	106.4 (4.19)	924.9 (36.41)
Average precipitation days (≥ 1.0 mm)	12.2	10.1	10.7	11.2	10.0	8.3	7.1	7.0	9.3	10.7	13.3	12.7	122.5
Average relative humidity (%)	86	80	74	71	71	70	69	70	73	81	86	87	77
Average dew point °C (°F)	4 (39)	4 (39)	5 (41)	7 (45)	10 (50)	13 (55)	15 (59)	15 (59)	13 (55)	11 (52)	8 (46)	5 (41)	9 (48)
Mean monthly sunshine hours	89.8	117.4	170.2	186.0	220.8	237.7	256.0	248.8	208.8	150.3	100.0	84.1	2,069.8
Source 1: Meteociel
Source 2: Time and Date

Climate data for Bordeaux (Bordeaux–Mérignac Airport), elevation: 47 m (154 ft), 1961–1990 normals and extremes
Month	Jan	Feb	Mar	Apr	May	Jun	Jul	Aug	Sep	Oct	Nov	Dec	Year
Record high °C (°F)	19.1 (66.4)	25.0 (77.0)	27.7 (81.9)	28.6 (83.5)	32.6 (90.7)	37.0 (98.6)	38.8 (101.8)	38.3 (100.9)	37.0 (98.6)	31.5 (88.7)	24.7 (76.5)	22.5 (72.5)	38.8 (101.8)
Mean maximum °C (°F)	12.6 (54.7)	16.3 (61.3)	17.1 (62.8)	19.5 (67.1)	25.3 (77.5)	29.3 (84.7)	29.2 (84.6)	29.4 (84.9)	27.0 (80.6)	21.4 (70.5)	16.1 (61.0)	14.4 (57.9)	29.4 (84.9)
Mean daily maximum °C (°F)	9.9 (49.8)	11.1 (52.0)	13.4 (56.1)	16.1 (61.0)	19.4 (66.9)	23.2 (73.8)	25.9 (78.6)	25.5 (77.9)	24.0 (75.2)	19.3 (66.7)	13.2 (55.8)	10.0 (50.0)	17.6 (63.7)
Daily mean °C (°F)	6.2 (43.2)	7.5 (45.5)	8.7 (47.7)	11.2 (52.2)	14.2 (57.6)	17.7 (63.9)	20.2 (68.4)	19.6 (67.3)	17.9 (64.2)	14.3 (57.7)	9.1 (48.4)	6.6 (43.9)	12.8 (55.0)
Mean daily minimum °C (°F)	2.5 (36.5)	3.6 (38.5)	4.2 (39.6)	6.3 (43.3)	9.1 (48.4)	12.4 (54.3)	14.3 (57.7)	13.9 (57.0)	12.2 (54.0)	9.2 (48.6)	4.7 (40.5)	3.2 (37.8)	8.0 (46.3)
Mean minimum °C (°F)	−3.1 (26.4)	−1.8 (28.8)	−0.1 (31.8)	3.7 (38.7)	7.8 (46.0)	9.4 (48.9)	12.4 (54.3)	12.6 (54.7)	9.2 (48.6)	5.3 (41.5)	2.0 (35.6)	−0.4 (31.3)	−3.1 (26.4)
Record low °C (°F)	−16.4 (2.5)	−13.2 (8.2)	−9.9 (14.2)	−3.0 (26.6)	−0.5 (31.1)	4.0 (39.2)	6.9 (44.4)	6.0 (42.8)	2.2 (36.0)	−1.7 (28.9)	−7.3 (18.9)	−13.0 (8.6)	−16.4 (2.5)
Average precipitation mm (inches)	92.4 (3.64)	86.9 (3.42)	74.0 (2.91)	69.4 (2.73)	67.4 (2.65)	51.3 (2.02)	41.2 (1.62)	45.3 (1.78)	72.0 (2.83)	67.8 (2.67)	96.7 (3.81)	79.7 (3.14)	844.1 (33.22)
Average precipitation days (≥ 1.0 mm)	13.1	11.5	11.7	11.2	11.1	8.5	6.7	8.3	9.0	10.1	11.9	12.3	125.4
Average snowy days	1.1	1.2	0.6	0.0	0.0	0.0	0.0	0.0	0.0	0.0	0.2	0.8	3.9
Average relative humidity (%)	88	84	78	76	77	76	75	76	79	85	87	88	80.8
Mean monthly sunshine hours	86.3	108.8	161.9	189.6	211.1	242.2	276.3	248.7	207.1	165.4	103.2	83.0	2,083.6
Percentage possible sunshine	31	38	45	47	47	53	59	58	56	49	36	31	46
Source 1: NOAA
Source 2: Infoclimat.fr (humidity)

== Economy ==
Bordeaux is a major centre for business in France as it has the sixth-largest metropolitan population in France. It serves as a major regional center for trade, administration, services and industry.

=== Wine ===
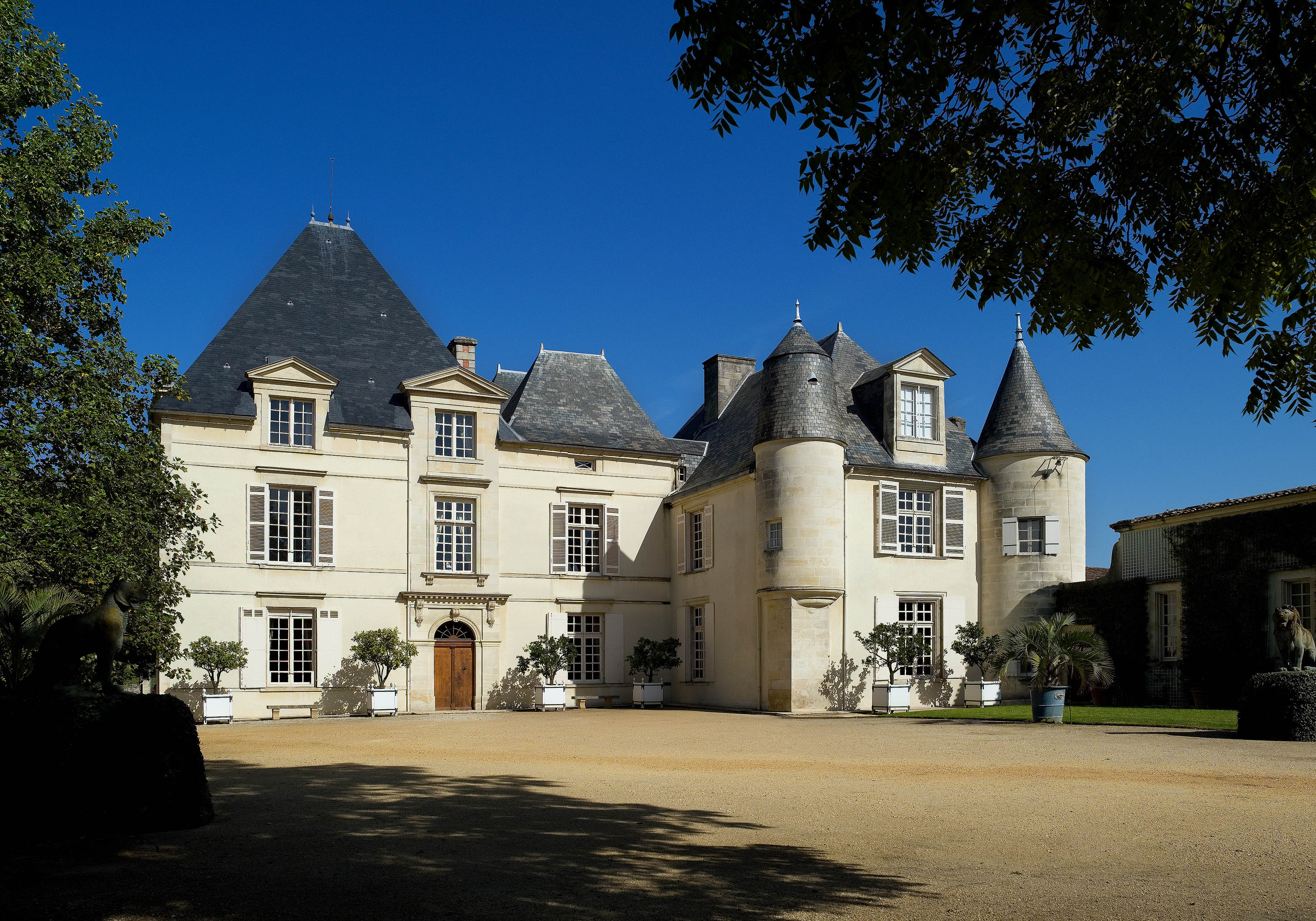
Château Haut-Brion

The vine was introduced to the Bordeaux region by the Romans, probably in the mid-first century, to provide wine for local consumption, and wine production has been continuous in the region since.

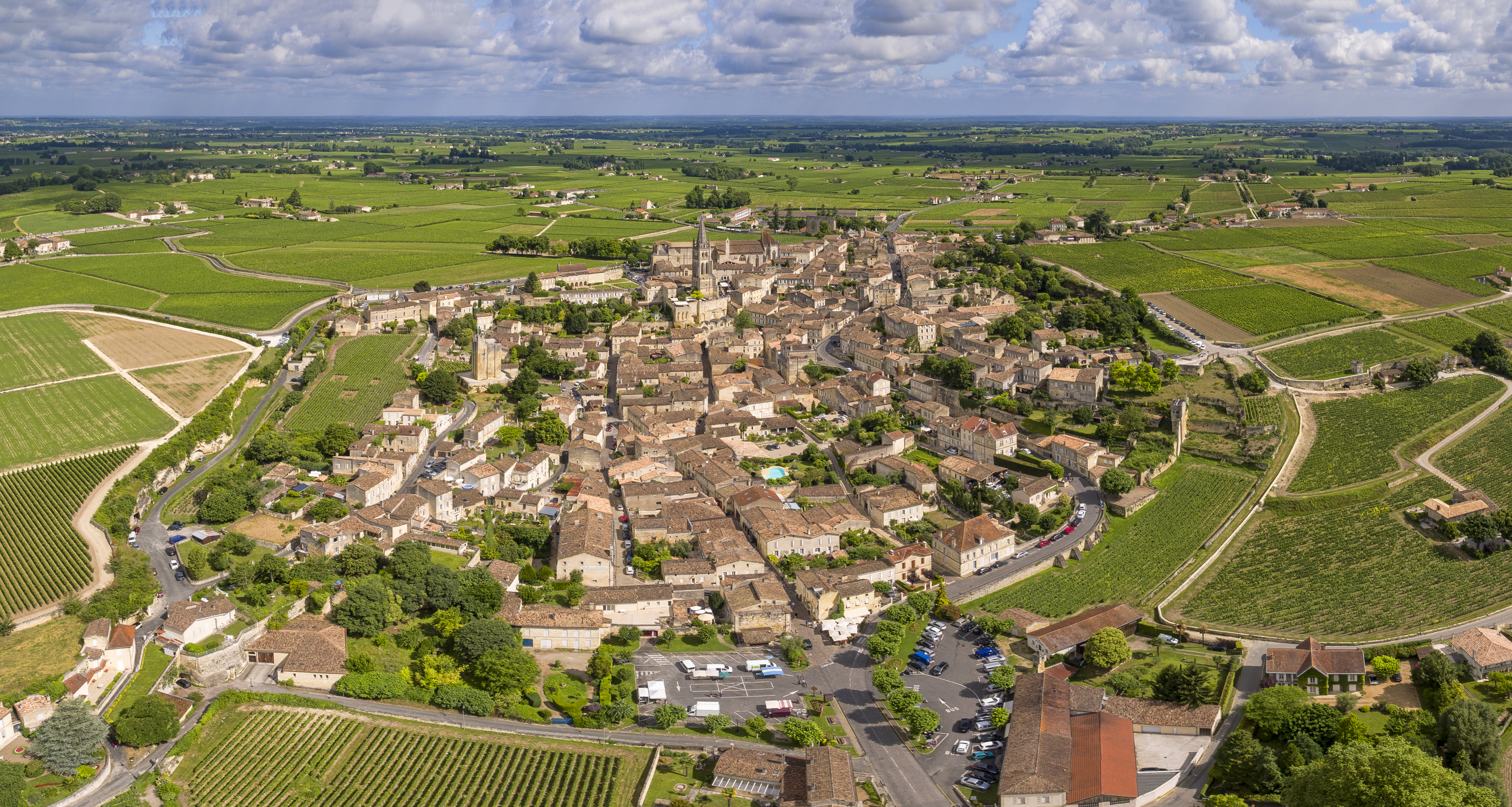
Saint-Émilion aerial view

Bordeaux wine growing area has about 116,160 hectares (287,000 acres) of vineyards, 57 appellations, 10,000 wine-producing estates (châteaux) and 13,000 grape growers. With an annual production of approximately 960 million bottles, the Bordeaux area produces large quantities of everyday wine as well as some of the most expensive wines in the world. Included among the latter are the area's five premier cru (First Growth) red wines (four from Médoc and one, Château Haut-Brion, from Graves), established by the Bordeaux Wine Official Classification of 1855.

Both red and white wines are made in the Bordeaux region. Red Bordeaux wine is called claret in the United Kingdom. Red wines are generally made from a blend of grapes, and may be made from Cabernet Sauvignon, Merlot, Cabernet Franc, Petit verdot, Malbec, and, less commonly in recent years, Carménère.

White Bordeaux is made from Sauvignon blanc, Sémillon, and Muscadelle. Sauternes is a sub-region of Graves known for its intensely sweet, white, dessert wines such as Château d'Yquem.

Because of a wine glut (wine lake) in the generic production, the price squeeze induced by an increasingly strong international competition, and vine pull schemes, the number of growers has recently dropped from 14,000 and the area under vine has also decreased significantly. In the meantime, the global demand for first growths and the most famous labels markedly increased and their prices skyrocketed.

The Cité du Vin, a museum as well as a place of exhibitions, shows, movie projections and academic seminars on the theme of wine opened its doors in June 2016.

=== Others ===
The Laser Mégajoule is one of the most powerful lasers in the world, allowing fundamental research and development of laser and plasma technologies.

Some 15,000 people work for the aeronautic industry in Bordeaux. The city has some of the biggest companies including Dassault, EADS Sogerma, Snecma, Thales, SNPE, and others. The Dassault Falcon private jets are built there as well as the military aircraft Rafale and Mirage 2000, the Airbus A380 cockpit, the boosters of Ariane 5, and the M51 SLBM missile.

Tourism, especially wine tourism, is a major industry. Globelink.co.uk mentioned Bordeaux as the best tourist destination in Europe in 2015. Gourmet Touring is a tourism company operating in the Bordeaux wine region.

Access to the port from the Atlantic is via the Gironde estuary. Almost nine million tonnes of goods arrive and leave each year.

=== Major companies ===
This list includes indigenous Bordeaux-based companies and companies that have major presence in Bordeaux, but are not necessarily headquartered there.

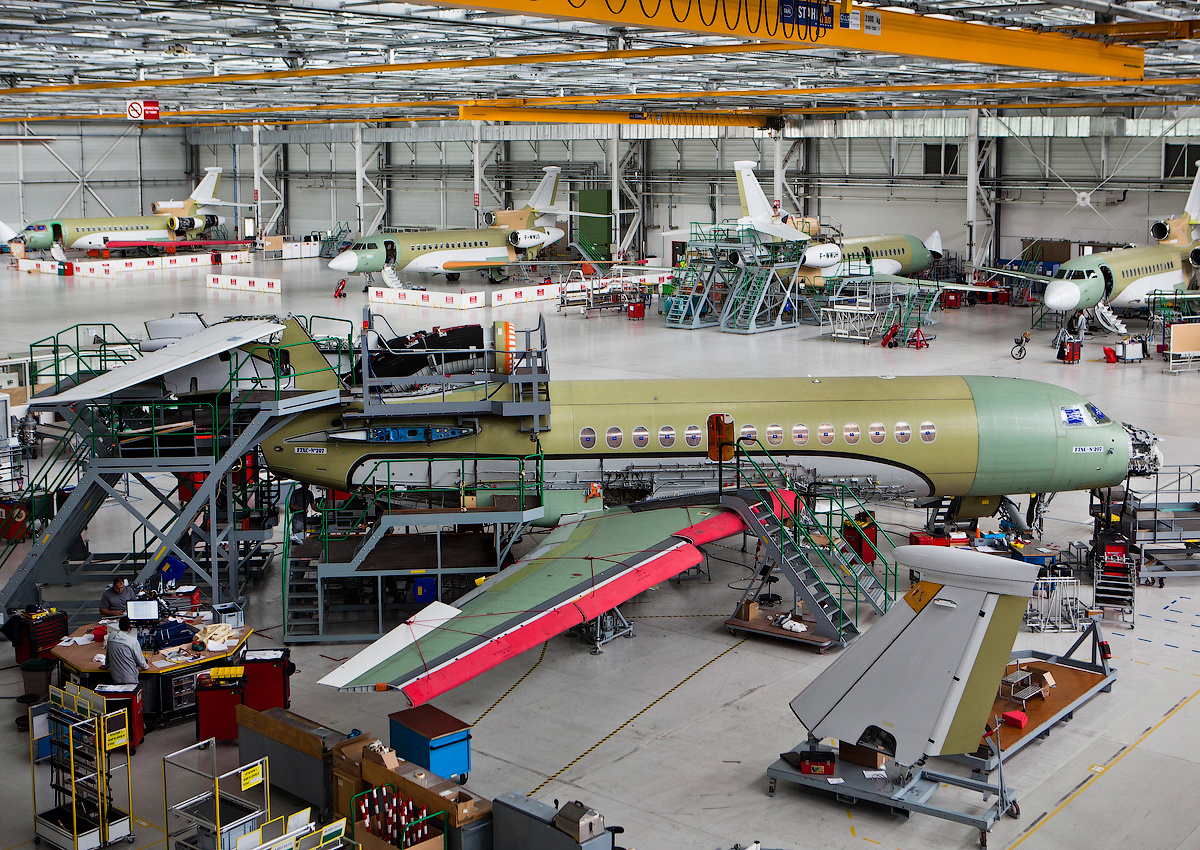
Dassault Falcon 7X assembly line at Merignac

- Arena
- Groupe Bernard
- Groupe Castel
- Cdiscount
- Dassault
- Jock
- Marie Brizard
- McKesson Corporation
- Oxbow
- Ricard
- Sanofi Aventis
- Smurfit Kappa
- Snecma
- Solectron
- Thales Group

== Population ==
Largest groups of immigrants (Note: An immigrant is a person born in a foreign country not having French citizenship at birth. Note that an immigrant may have acquired French citizenship since moving to France, but is still considered an immigrant in French statistics. On the other hand, persons born in France with foreign citizenship (the children of immigrants) are not listed as immigrants.) living in the Bordeaux metropolitan area
Country of birth	Population (2019)
Portugal	15,551
Morocco	15,207
Algeria	10,006
Spain	7,756
Turkey	4,231
Tunisia	2,875
Italy	2,683
Senegal	2,373
Romania	2,197
Madagascar	1,784
Cameroon	1,759
China	1,724
United Kingdom	1,603
Ivory Coast	1,589

In January 2023, there were 267,991 inhabitants in the city proper (commune) of Bordeaux. The commune (including Caudéran which was annexed by Bordeaux in 1965) had its largest population of 284,494 at the 1954 census. The majority of the population is French, but there are sizable groups of Italians, Spaniards, Portuguese, Turks, Germans.

The built-up area has grown for more than a century beyond the municipal borders of Bordeaux due to the small size of the commune (49 km^{2} (19 sq mi)) and urban sprawl. By January 2020 there were 1,376,375 people living in the overall 6,316 km^{2} (2,439 sq mi) metropolitan area (aire d'attraction) of Bordeaux, only a fifth of whom lived in the city proper.

Population of Bordeaux (commune)
(incl. Caudéran annexed in 1965)

Year	Pop.	±% p.a.
1793	107,198	—
1800	93,570	−1.92%
1806	94,214	+0.11%
1821	91,161	−0.22%
1831	101,965	+1.13%
1836	101,769	−0.04%
1841	108,176	+1.23%
1846	129,217	+3.56%
1851	135,308	+0.93%
1856	154,394	+2.81%
1861	168,422	+1.73%
1866	198,112	+3.30%
1872	199,174	+0.09%
1876	220,446	+2.28%
1881	227,736	+0.63%
1886	248,545	+1.94%
1891	261,085	+1.02%
1896	267,369	+0.48%
1901	268,186	+0.06%

Year	Pop.	±% p.a.
1906	264,835	−0.25%
1911	275,468	+0.79%
1921	283,394	+0.28%
1926	273,840	−0.68%
1931	283,374	+0.69%
1936	281,338	−0.14%
1946	279,128	−0.08%
1954	284,494	+0.23%
1962	278,403	−0.28%
1968	266,662	−0.72%
1975	223,131	−2.53%
1982	208,159	−0.98%
1990	210,336	+0.13%
1999	215,363	+0.26%
2007	235,178	+1.13%
2012	241,287	+0.51%
2017	254,436	+1.07%
2023	267,991	+0.87%

Source: EHESS and INSEE

== Politics ==
=== Municipal administration ===
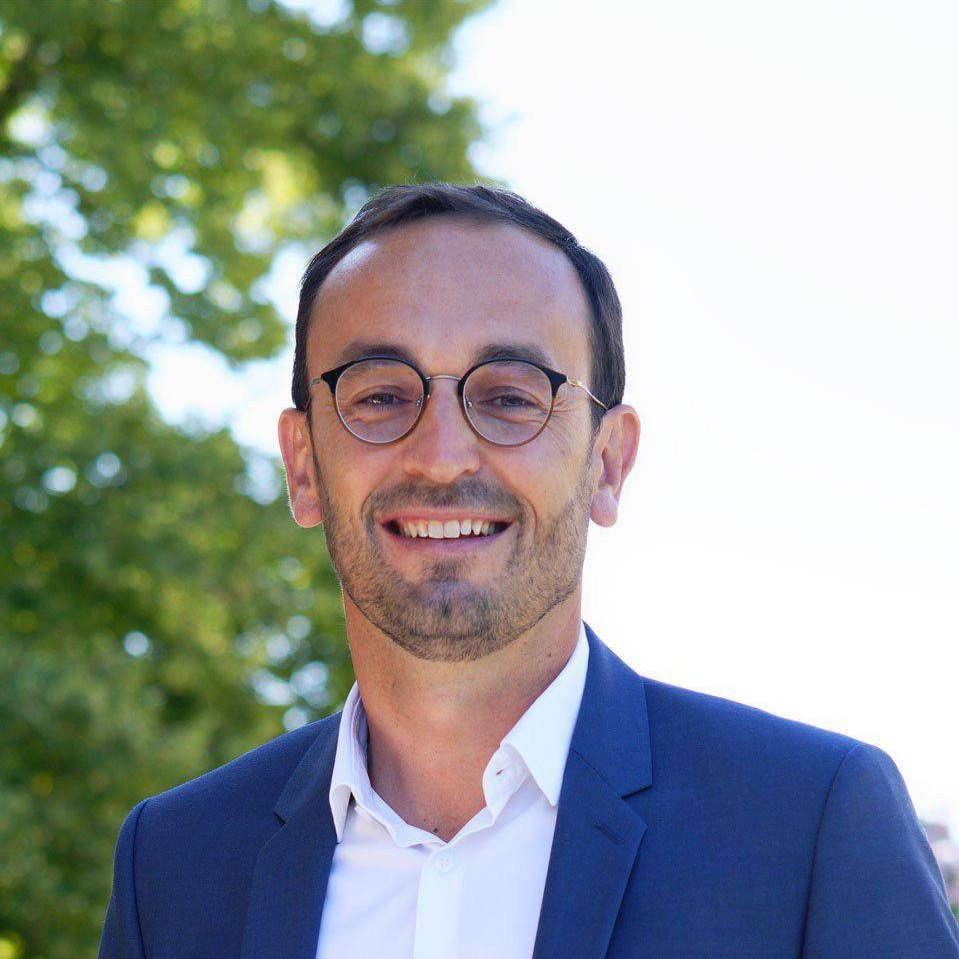
The current mayor, Thomas Cazenave

The Mayor of the city is Thomas Cazenave.

Bordeaux is the capital of five cantons and the Prefecture of the Gironde and Aquitaine.

The city is divided into three districts, the first three of Gironde. The headquarters of Urban Community of Bordeaux Mériadeck is located in the neighbourhood and the city is at the head of the Chamber of Commerce and Industry that bears his name.

The number of inhabitants of Bordeaux is greater than 250,000 and less than 299,999 so the number of municipal councilors is 65. They are divided according to the following composition:

Party	Political line	President	Seats	Status
EELV – PS – PCF – PRG – G.s – ND – PP	Ecologist and left	Pierre Hurmic	48	majority
LR – MR – Modem – Agir – UDI – LREM	Right and centre-right	Nicolas Florian	14	opposition
NPA – LFI – PG – E !	Anticapitalist left	Philippe Poutou	3	opposition

=== Mayors of Bordeaux ===
Since the Liberation (1944), there have been seven mayors of Bordeaux:

Mayor	Term start	Term end	Party
Fernand Audeguil	August 1944	19 October 1947	SFIO
Jacques Chaban-Delmas	19 October 1947	19 June 1995	RPR
Alain Juppé	19 June 1995	13 December 2004	RPR / UMP
Hugues Martin	13 December 2004	8 October 2006	UMP
Alain Juppé	8 October 2006	7 March 2019	UMP / LR
Nicolas Florian	7 March 2019	3 July 2020	LR
Pierre Hurmic	3 July 2020	27 March 2026	EELV
Thomas Cazenave	27 March 2026	Incumbent	Renaissance

- RPR was renamed to UMP in 2002 which was later renamed to LR in 2015.

=== Elections ===
==== Presidential elections of 2007 ====
At the 2007 presidential election, the Bordelais gave 31.37% of their votes to Ségolène Royal of the Socialist Party against 30.84% to Nicolas Sarkozy, president of the UMP. Then came François Bayrou with 22.01%, followed by Jean-Marie Le Pen who recorded 5.42%. None of the other candidates exceeded the 5% mark. Nationally, Nicolas Sarkozy led with 31.18%, then Ségolène Royal with 25.87%, followed by François Bayrou with 18.57%. After these came Jean-Marie Le Pen with 10.44%, none of the other candidates exceeded the 5% mark. In the second round, the city of Bordeaux gave Ségolène Royal 52.44% against 47.56% for Nicolas Sarkozy, the latter being elected President of the Republic with 53.06% against 46.94% for Ségolène Royal. The abstention rates for Bordeaux were 14.52% in the first round and 15.90% in the second round.

==== Parliamentary elections of 2007 ====
In the parliamentary elections of 2007, the left won eight constituencies against only three for the right. After the partial 2008 elections, the eighth district of Gironde switched to the left, bringing the count to nine. In Bordeaux, the left was for the first time in its history the majority as it held two of three constituencies following the elections. In the first division of the Gironde, the outgoing UMP MP Chantal Bourragué was well ahead with 44.81% against 25.39% for the Socialist candidate Béatrice Desaigues. In the second round, it was Chantal Bourragué who was re-elected with 54.45% against 45.55% for his socialist opponent. In the second district of Gironde the UMP mayor and all new Minister of Ecology, Energy, Sustainable Development and the Sea Alain Juppé confronted the General Counsel PS Michèle Delaunay. In the first round, Alain Juppé was well ahead with 43.73% against 31.36% for Michèle Delaunay. In the second round, it was finally Michèle Delaunay who won the election with 50.93% of the votes against 49.07% for Alain Juppé, the margin being only 670 votes. The defeat of the so-called constituency "Mayor" showed that Bordeaux was rocking increasingly left. Finally, in the third constituency of the Gironde, Noël Mamère was well ahead with 39.82% against 28.42% for the UMP candidate Elizabeth Vine. In the second round, Noël Mamère was re-elected with 62.82% against 37.18% for his right-wing rival.

==== Municipal elections of 2008 ====
In 2008 municipal elections saw the clash between mayor of Bordeaux, Alain Juppé and the President of the Regional Council of Aquitaine Socialist Alain Rousset. The PS had put up a Socialist heavyweight in the Gironde and had put great hopes in this election after the victory of Ségolène Royal and Michèle Delaunay in 2007. However, after the campaign it was Alain Juppé who was elected in the first round with 56.62 percent, far ahead of Alain Rousset who garnered 34.14 percent of the vote. At present, of the eight cantons that has Bordeaux, five are held by the PS and three by the UMP, the left eating a little each time into the right's numbers.

==== European elections of 2009 ====
In the European elections of 2009, Bordeaux voters largely voted for the UMP candidate Dominique Baudis, who won 31.54% against 15.00% for PS candidate Kader Arif. The candidate of Europe Ecology José Bové came second with 22.34%. None of the other candidates reached the 10% mark. The 2009 European elections were like the previous ones in eight constituencies. Bordeaux is located in the district "Southwest", here are the results:

UMP candidate Dominique Baudis: 26.89%. His party gained four seats. PS candidate Kader Arif: 17.79%, gaining two seats in the European Parliament. Europe Ecology candidate Bove: 15.83%, obtaining two seats. MoDem candidate Robert Rochefort: 8.61%, winning a seat. Left Front candidate Jean-Luc Mélenchon: 8.16%, gaining the last seat. At regional elections in 2010, the Socialist incumbent president Alain Rousset won the first round by totaling 35.19% in Bordeaux, but this score was lower than the plan for Gironde and Aquitaine. Xavier Darcos, Minister of Labour followed with 28.40% of the votes, scoring above the regional and departmental average. Then came Monique De Marco, Green candidate with 13.40%, followed by the member of Pyrenees-Atlantiques and candidate of the MoDem Jean Lassalle who registered a low 6.78% while qualifying to the second round on the whole Aquitaine, closely followed by Jacques Colombier, candidate of the National Front, who gained 6.48%. Finally the candidate of the Left Front Gérard Boulanger with 5.64%, no other candidate above the 5% mark. In the second round, Alain Rousset had a tidal wave win as national totals rose to 55.83%. If Xavier Darcos largely lost the election, he nevertheless achieved a score above the regional and departmental average obtaining 33.40%. Jean Lassalle, who qualified for the second round, passed the 10% mark by totaling 10.77%. The ballot was marked by abstention amounting to 55.51% in the first round and 53.59% in the second round.

Only candidates obtaining more than 5% are listed

2007 Presidential Election
Candidate	1st round		2nd round	
Candidate	Bordeaux	National	Bordeaux	National
Nicolas Sarkozy	30.84%	31.18%	47.56%	53.06%
Ségolène Royal	31.37%	25.87%	52.44%	46.94%
François Bayrou	22.01%	18.57%		
Jean-Marie Le Pen	5.42%	10.44%		
Total votes	85.48%	83.77%	84.10%	83.97%

2012 Presidential Election
Candidate	1st round		2nd round	
Candidate	Bordeaux	National	Bordeaux	National
François Hollande	33.05%	28.63%	57.18%	51.64%
Nicolas Sarkozy	28.68%	27.18%	42.82%	48.36%
Jean-Luc Mélenchon	12.16%	11.10%		
François Bayrou	10.91%	9.13%		
Marine Le Pen	8.22%	17.90%		
Total votes	79.25%	79.48%	80.44%	80.35%

==== 2017 elections ====
Bordeaux voted for Emmanuel Macron in the presidential election. In the 2017 parliamentary election, La République En Marche! won most of the constituencies in Bordeaux.

==== 2019 European elections ====
Bordeaux voted in the 2019 European Parliament election in France.

==== Municipal elections of 2020 ====
After 73 years of right-of-centre rule, the ecologist Pierre Hurmic (EELV) came in ahead of Nicolas Florian (LR/LaREM).

=== Parliamentary representation ===
The city area is represented by the following constituencies: Gironde's 1st, Gironde's 2nd, Gironde's 3rd, Gironde's 4th, Gironde's 5th, Gironde's 6th, Gironde's 7th.

== Education ==
=== University ===
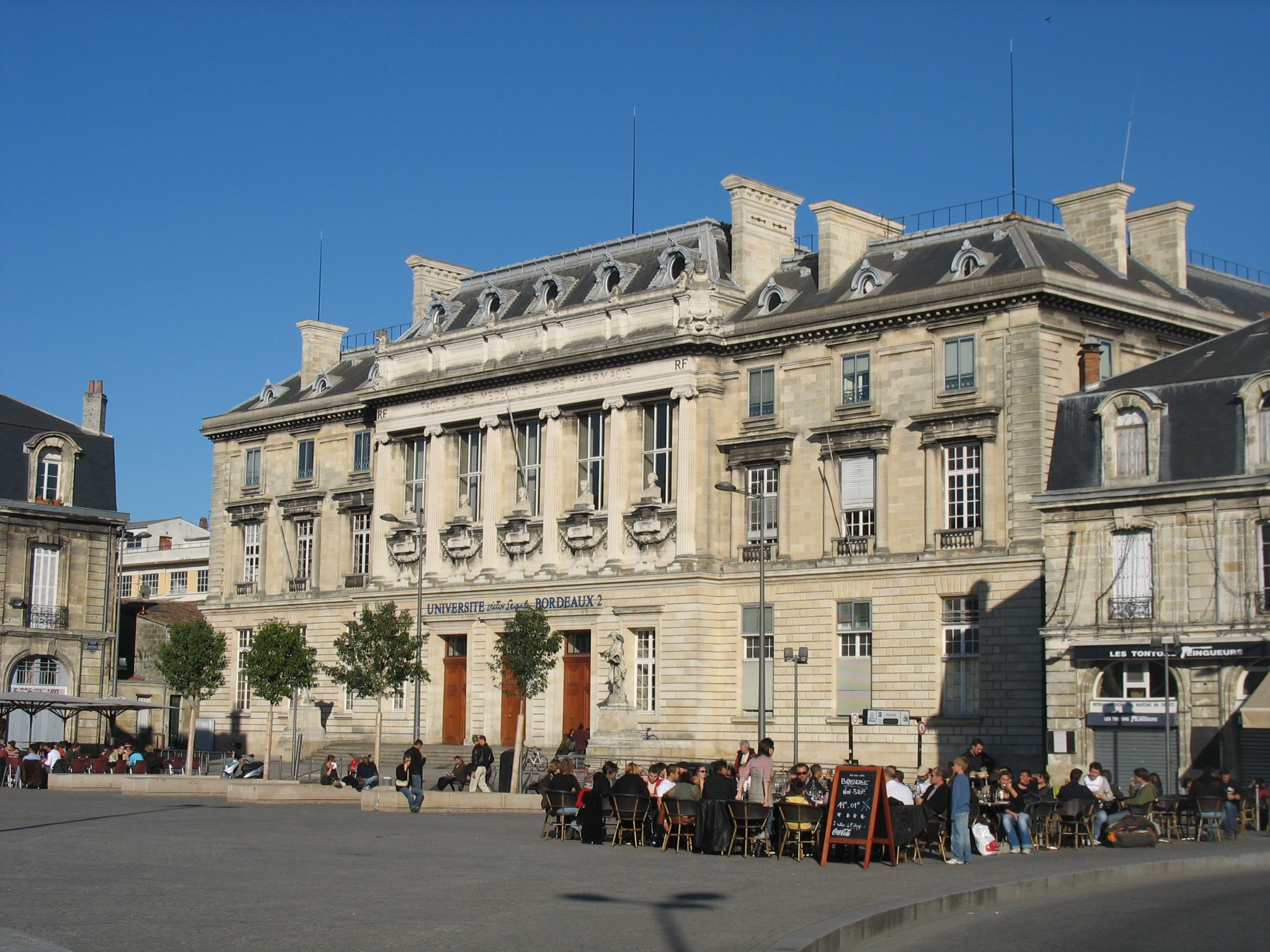
University Bordeaux 2, former faculty of medicine, now faculty of sociology

During Antiquity, a first university had been created by the Romans in 286. The city was an important administrative centre and the new university had to train administrators. Only rhetoric and grammar were taught. Ausonius and Sulpicius Severus were two of the teachers.

In 1441, when Bordeaux was an English town, the Pope Eugene IV created a university by demand of the archbishop Pey Berland. In 1793, during the French Revolution, the National Convention abolished the university, and replace them with the École centrale in 1796. In Bordeaux, this one was located in the former buildings of the college of Guyenne. In 1808, the university reappeared with Napoleon. Bordeaux accommodates approximately 70,000 students on one of the largest campuses of Europe (235 ha).

=== Schools ===
Bordeaux has numerous public and private schools offering undergraduate and postgraduate programs.

Engineering schools:

- Arts et Métiers ParisTech, graduate school of industrial and mechanical engineering
- ESME-Sudria, graduate school of engineering
- École nationale supérieure d'électronique, informatique, télécommunications, mathématique et mécanique de Bordeaux (ENSEIRB-MATMECA)
- École supérieure de technologie des biomolécules de Bordeaux
- École nationale supérieure des sciences agronomiques de Bordeaux Aquitaine
- École nationale supérieure de chimie et physique de Bordeaux
- École pour l'informatique et les nouvelles technologies
- Institut des sciences et techniques des aliments de Bordeaux
- Institut de cognitique
- École supérieure d'informatique
- École privée des sciences informatiques

Business and management schools:

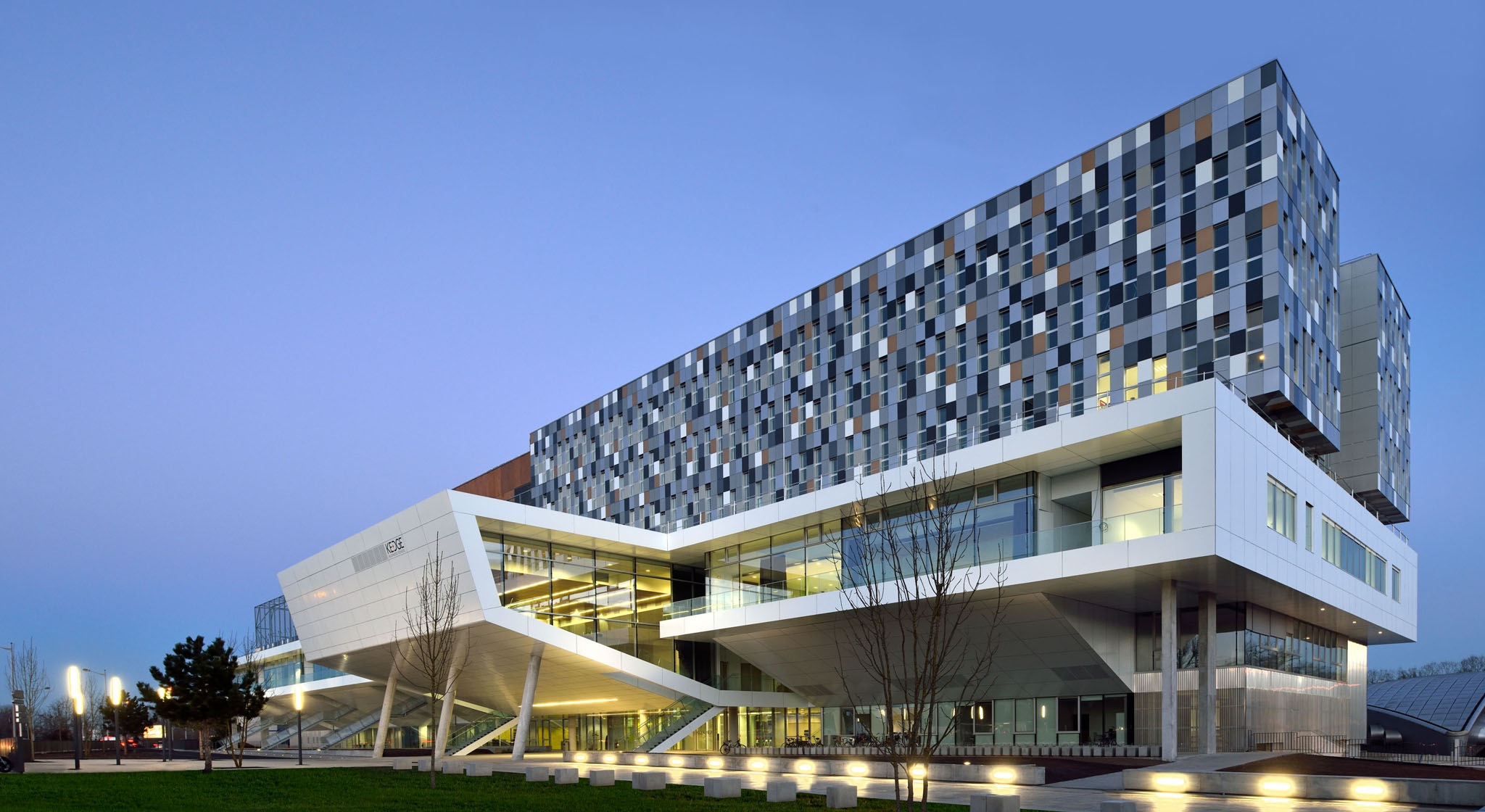
KEDGE Business School

- The Bordeaux MBA (International College of Bordeaux)
- IUT Techniques de Commercialisation of Bordeaux (business school)
- INSEEC Business School (Institut des hautes études économiques et commerciales)
- KEDGE Business School (former BEM – Bordeaux Management School)
- Vatel Bordeaux International Business School
- E-Artsup
- Institut supérieur européen de gestion group
- Institut supérieur européen de formation par l'action

Other:

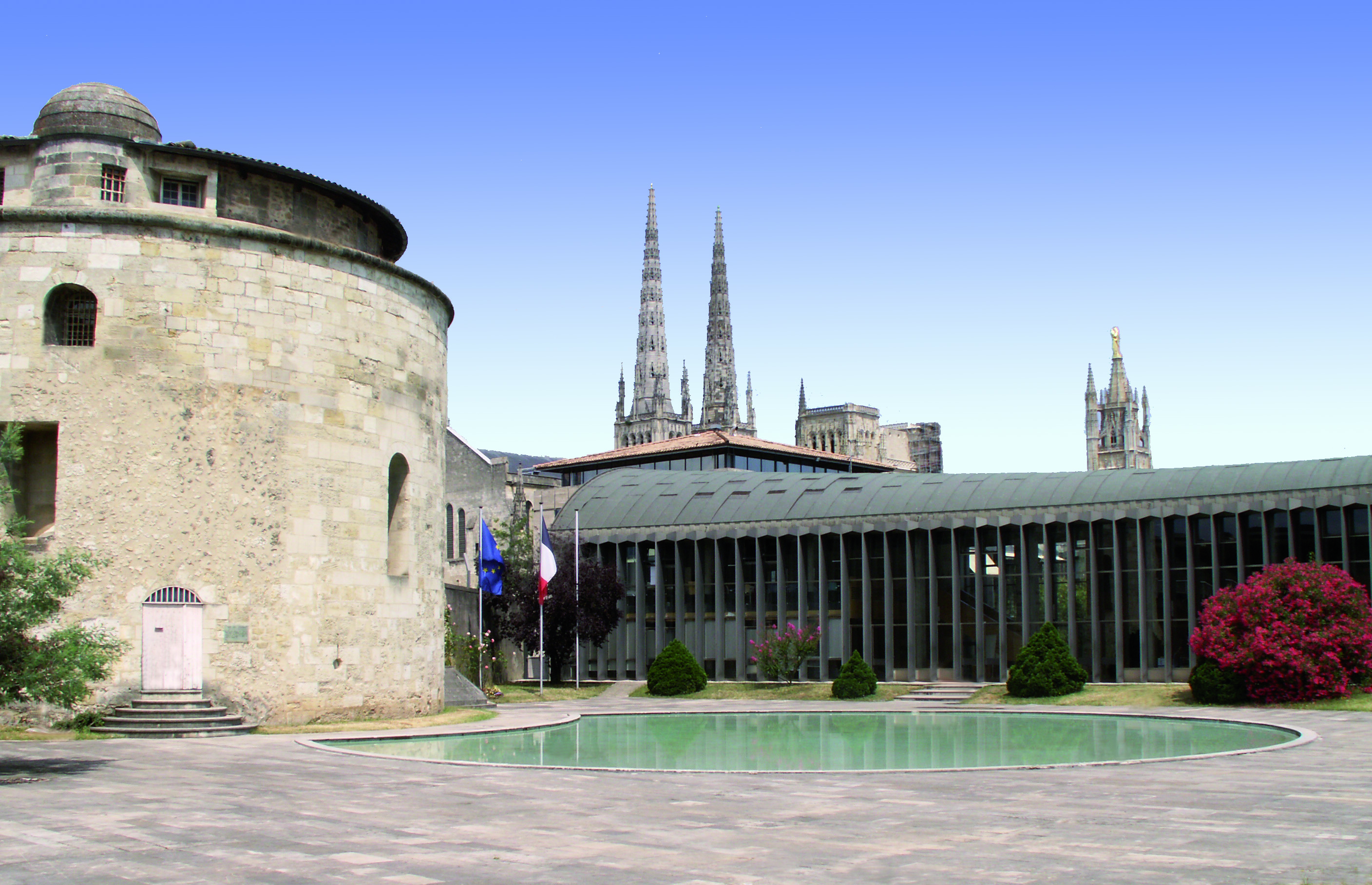
École nationale de la magistrature

- École nationale de la magistrature (National school for the judiciary)
- École d'architecture et de paysage de Bordeaux
- École des beaux-arts de Bordeaux
- École française des attachés de presse et des professionnels de la communication (EFAP)
- Conservatoire national des arts et métiers d'Aquitaine (CNAM)
- École des Avocats ALIENOR de Bordeaux (law school)

=== Weekend education ===
The École Compleméntaire Japonaise de Bordeaux (ボルドー日本語補習授業校, Borudō Nihongo Hoshū Jugyō Kō), a part-time Japanese supplementary school, is held in the Salle de L'Athénée Municipal in Bordeaux.

== Attractions and tourism ==
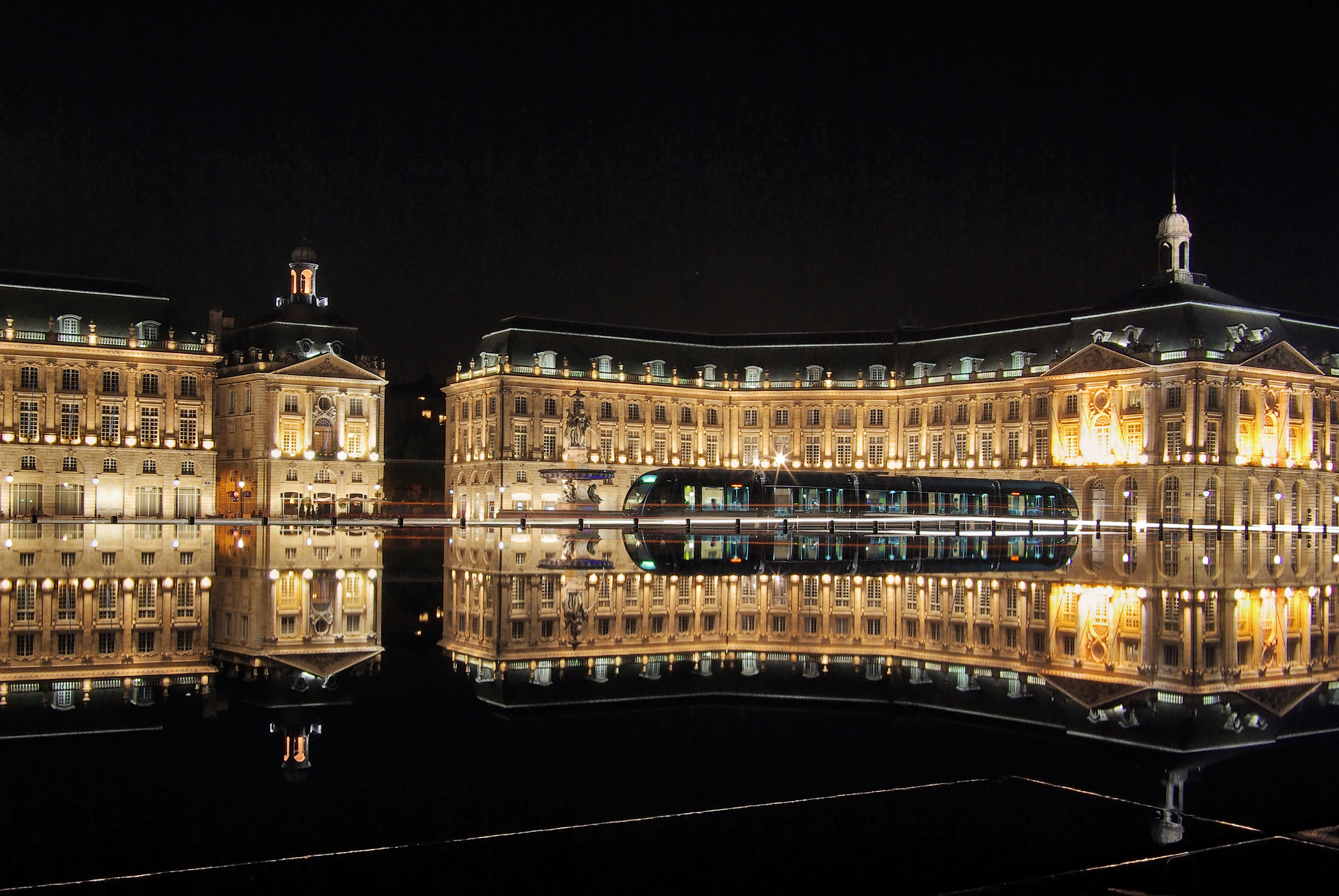
Place de la Bourse at night with the Miroir d'eau and tram

In October 2021, Bordeaux was shortlisted for the European Commission's 2022 European Capital of Smart Tourism award along with Copenhagen, Dublin, Florence, Ljubljana, Palma de Mallorca, and Valencia.

=== Heritage and architecture ===
Bordeaux is classified "City of Art and History". The city is home to 362 monuments historiques (national heritage sites), with some buildings dating back to Roman times. Bordeaux's Port of the Moon has been inscribed on the UNESCO World Heritage List as "an outstanding urban and architectural ensemble".

Bordeaux is home to one of Europe's biggest 18th-century architectural urban areas, making it a sought-after destination for tourists and cinema production crews. It stands out as one of the first French cities, after Nancy, to have entered an era of urbanism and metropolitan big scale projects, with the team Gabriel father and son, architects for King Louis XV, under the supervision of two intendants (Governors), first Nicolas-François Dupré de Saint-Maur then the Marquis de Tourny.

Saint-André Cathedral, Saint-Michel Basilica and Saint-Seurin Basilica are part of the World Heritage Sites of the Routes of Santiago de Compostela in France. The organ in Saint-Louis-des-Chartrons is registered on the French monuments historiques.

Notable historic buildings include:

- Place de la Bourse (1735–1755), designed by the Royal architect Jacques Gabriel as landscape for an equestrian statue of Louis XV, now replaced by the Fountain of the Three Graces.
- Grand Théâtre (1780), a large neoclassical theater built in the 18th century.
- Allées de Tourny
- Cours de l'Intendance
- Place du Chapelet
- Place du Parlement
- Place des Quinconces, the largest square in France.
- Monument aux Girondins
- Place Saint-Pierre
- Pont de pierre (1822)
- Bordeaux Cathedral (Saint André), consecrated by Pope Urban II in 1096 and dedicated to the Apostle Saint Andrew. Of the original Romanesque edifice only a wall in the nave remains. The Royal Door is from the early 13th century, while the rest of the construction is mostly from the 14th and 15th centuries.
- Tour Pey-Berland (1440–1450), a massive, quadrangular Gothic tower annexed to the cathedral.
- Sainte-Croix church: This church, dedicated to the Holy Cross, stands on the site of a seventh-century abbey destroyed by the Saracens. Rebuilt under the Carolingians, it was again destroyed by the Normans in 845 and 864. The present building was erected and was built in the late 11th and early 12th centuries. The façade is in Romanesque style.
- The Gothic Saint Michel Basilica, constructed between the end of the 14th century and the 16th century.
- Basilica of Saint Severinus, the oldest church in Bordeaux, built in the early sixth century on the site of a palaeo-Christian necropolis. It has an 11th-century portico, while the apse and transept are from the 12th. The 13th-century nave has chapels from the 11th and the 14th centuries. The ancient crypt houses tombs of the Merovingian family.
- Église Saint-Pierre, Gothic church
- Église Saint-Éloi, Gothic church
- Église Saint-Bruno, baroque church decorated with frescoes
- Église Notre-Dame, baroque church
- Église Saint-Paul-Saint-François-Xavier, baroque church
- Palais Rohan, once the archbishop's residence, now city hall
- Palais Gallien, the remains of a late second-century Roman amphitheatre
- Porte Cailhau, a medieval gatehouse in the old city walls.
- La Grosse Cloche (15th century), the second remaining gate in the medieval walls. It was the belfry of the old Town Hall. It consists of two 40-metre-high (131-foot) circular towers and a central bell tower housing a bell weighing 7,800 kilograms (17,200 lb). The clock is from 1759.
- Grande Synagogue, completed 1882
- Rue Sainte-Catherine, the longest pedestrian street in France
- Darwin ecosystem, alternative place into former military barracks
- The BETASOM submarine base
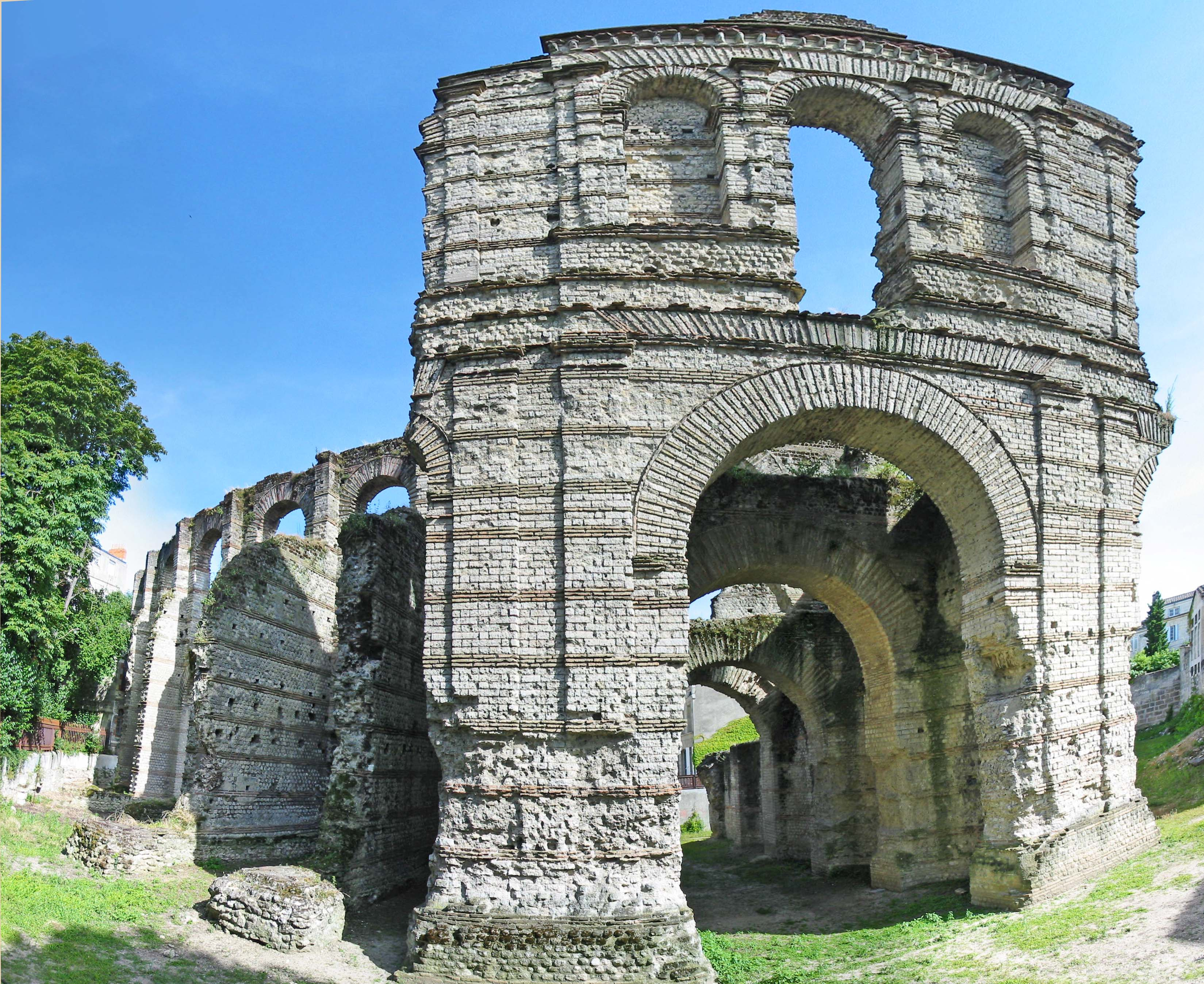
Palais Gallien

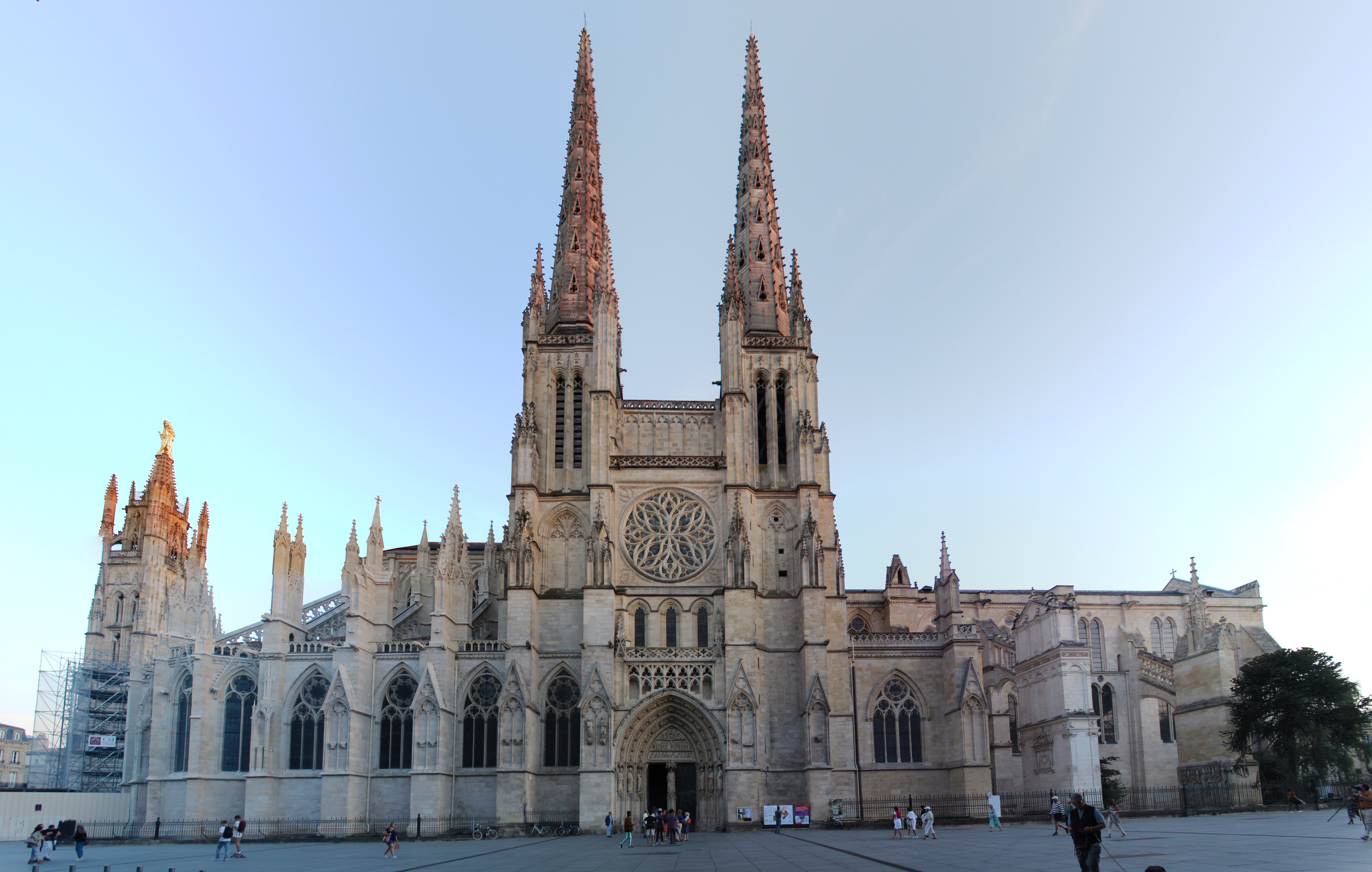
Bordeaux Cathedral (Saint André)

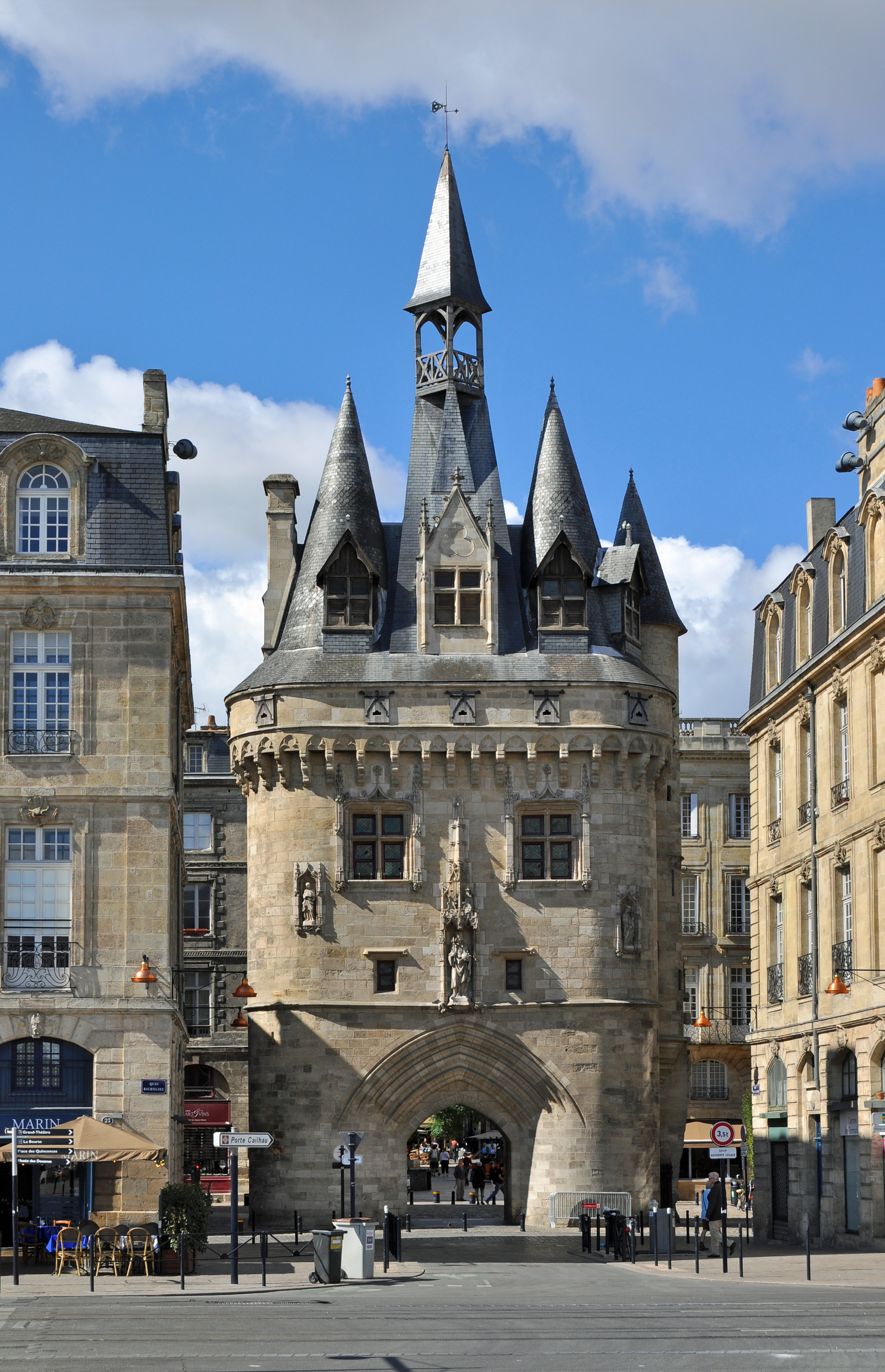
Porte Cailhau

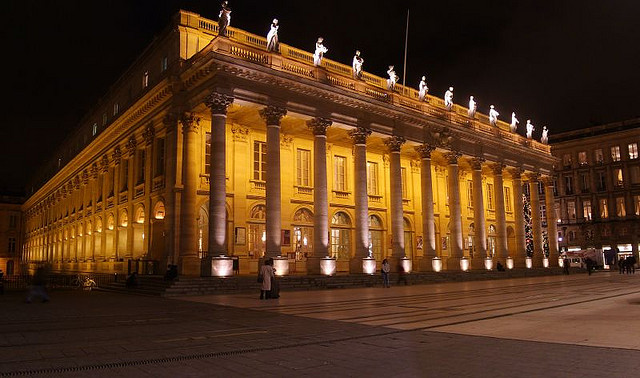
Grand Théâtre

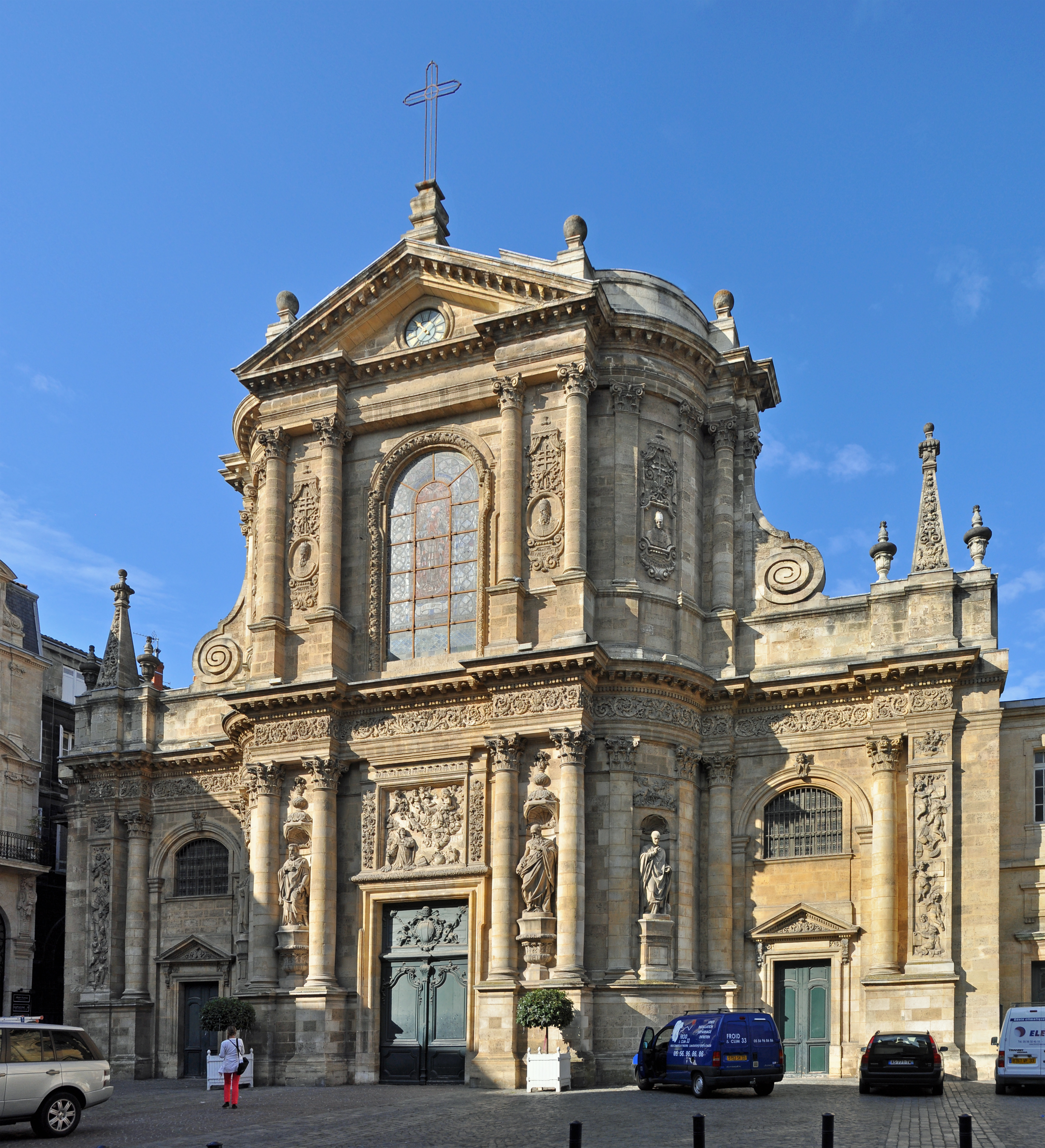
The Notre Dame church

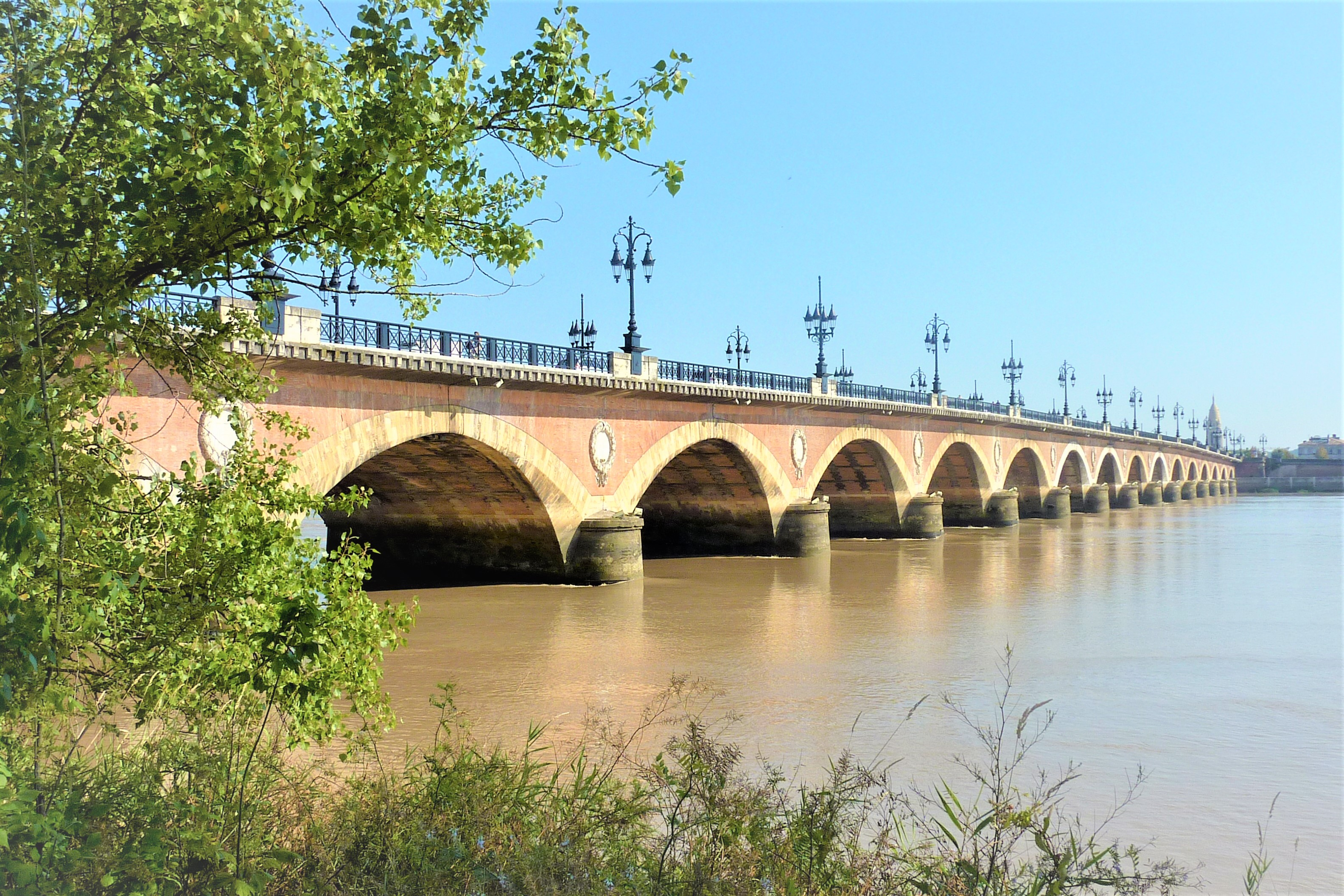
Pont de Pierre

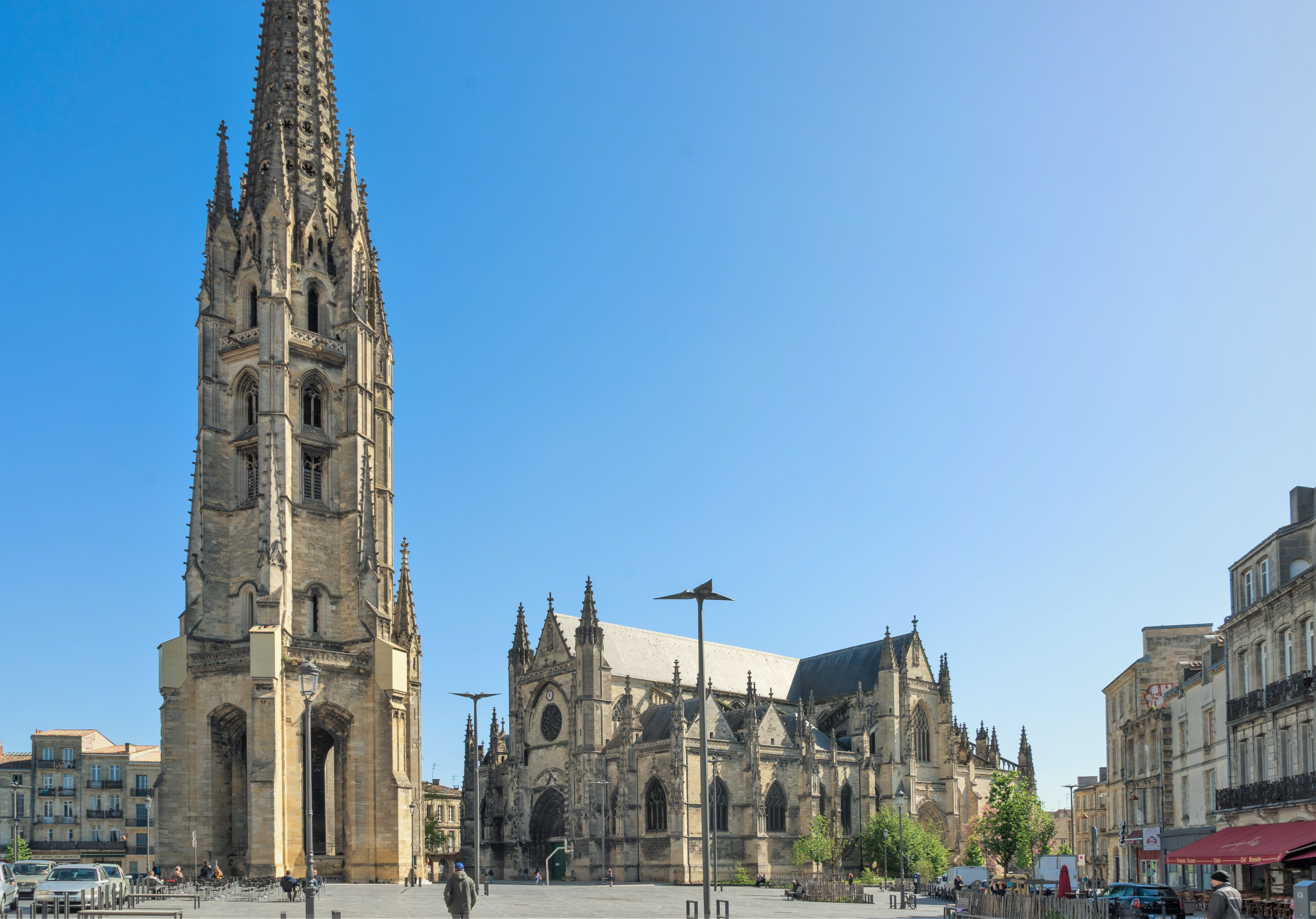
Basilica of Saint Michel

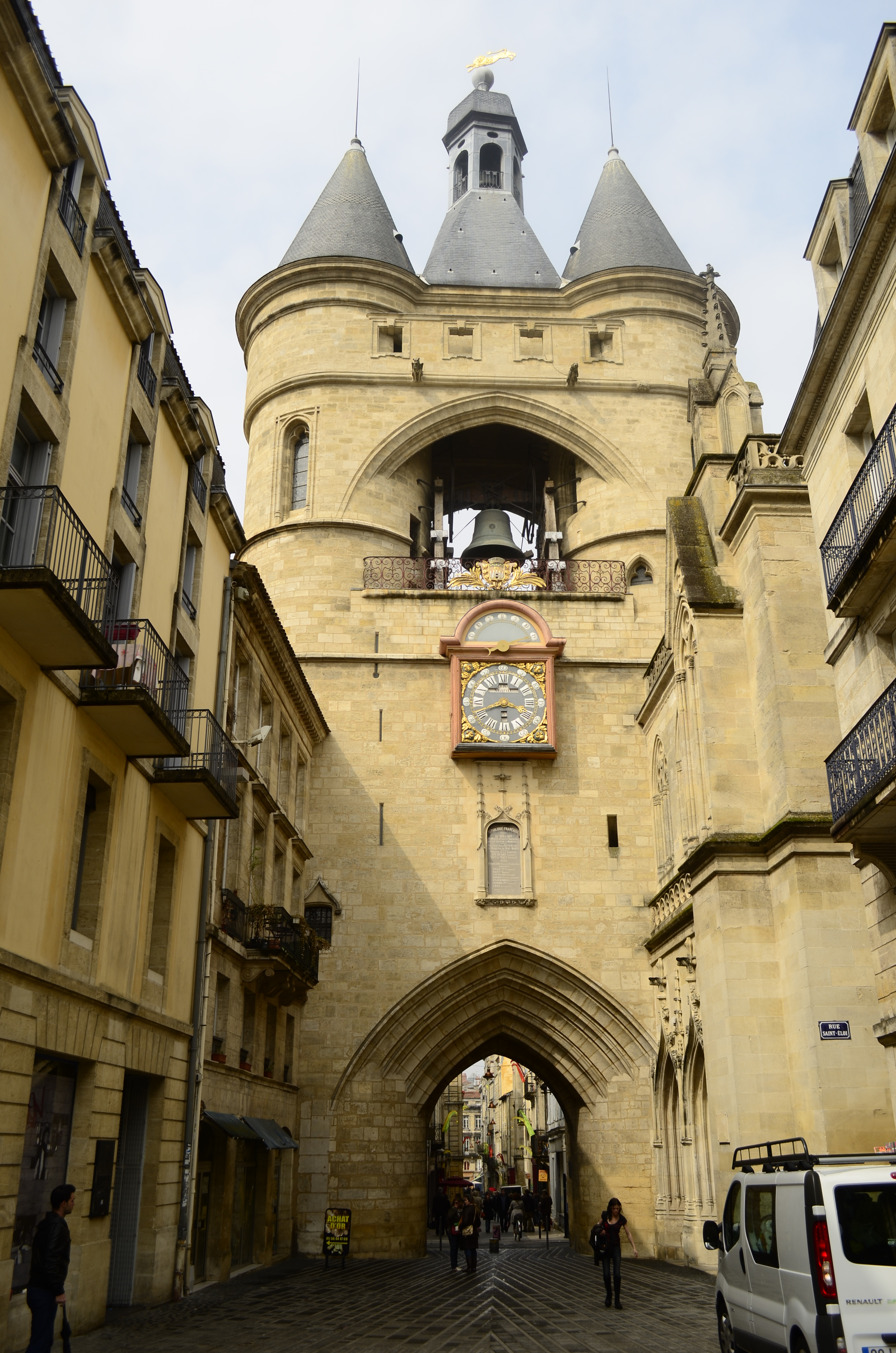
Grosse cloche

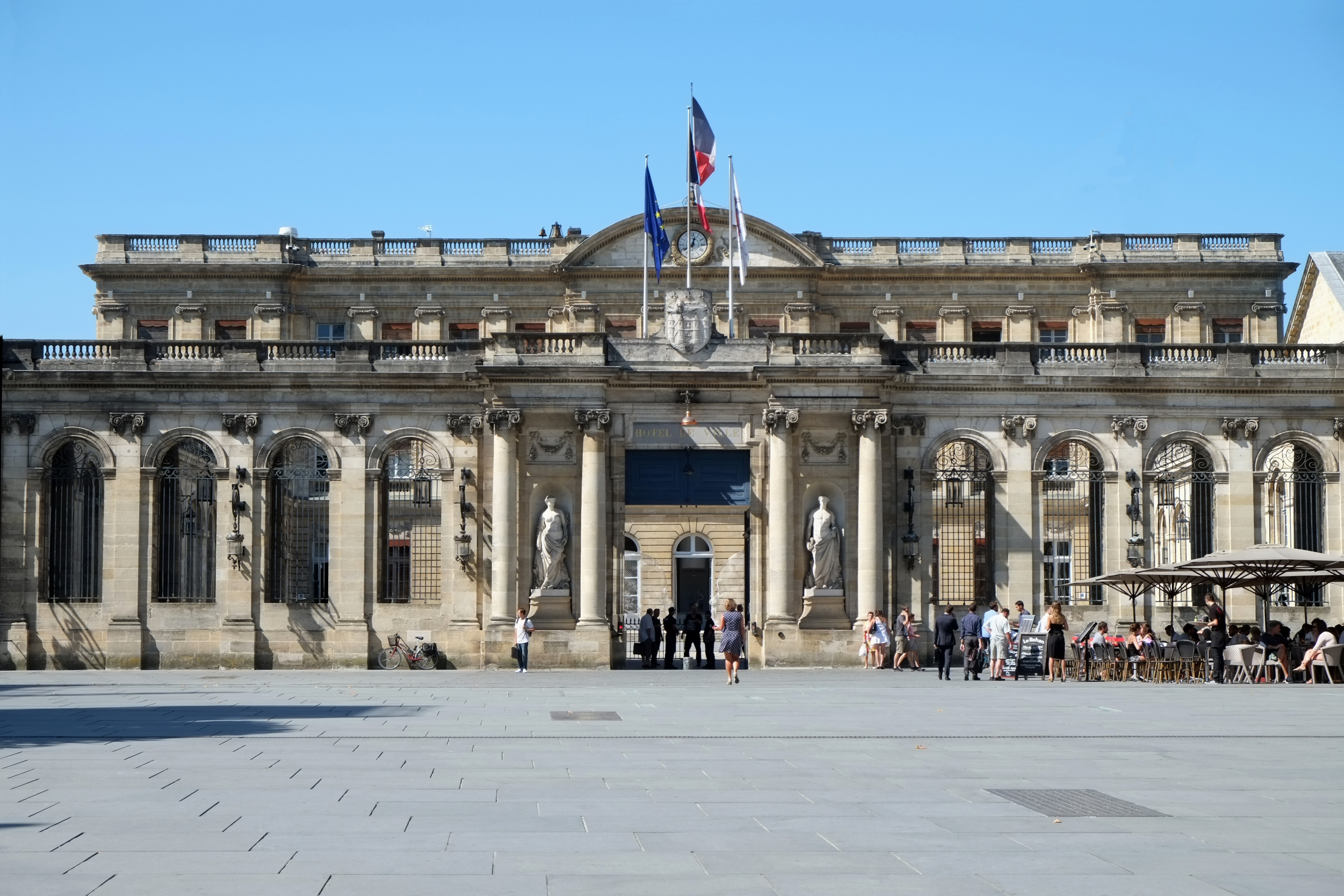
Palais Rohan (town hall)

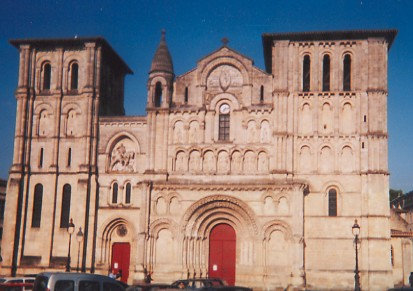
Sainte-Croix church

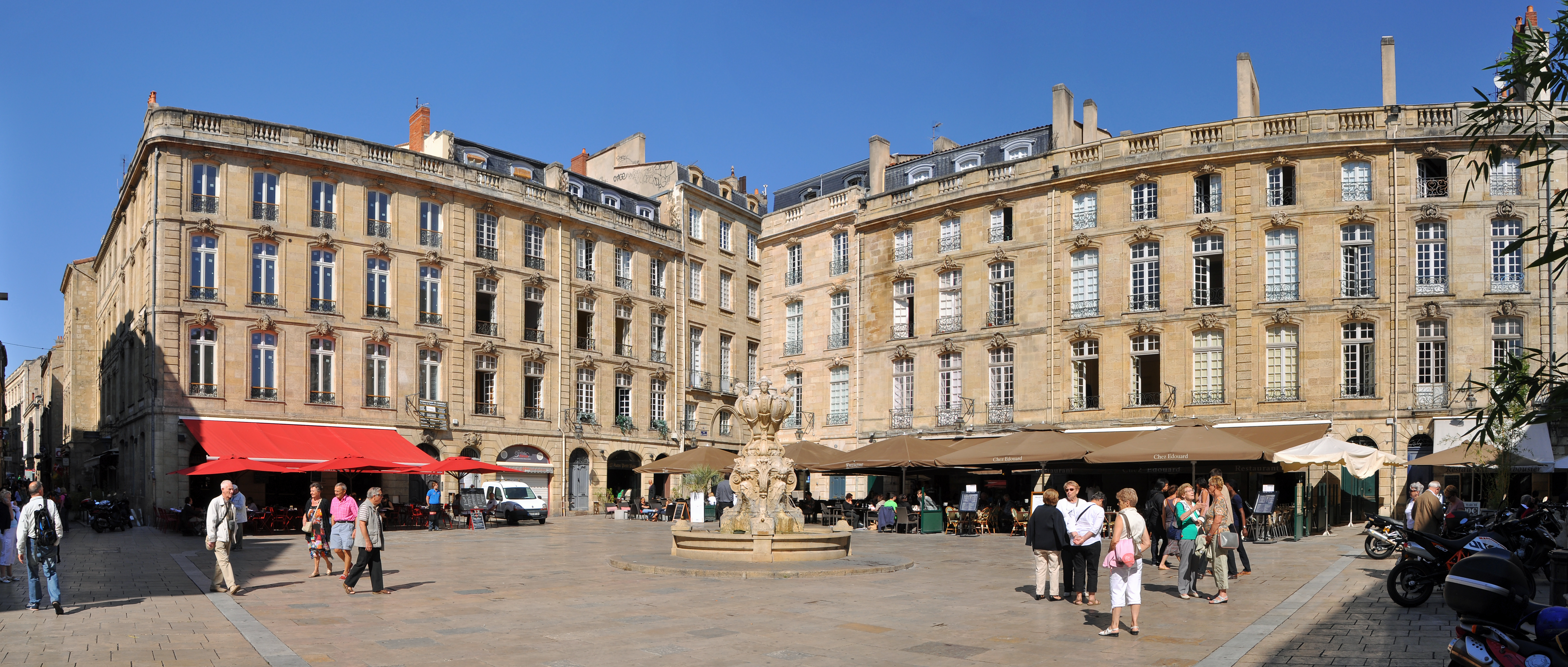
Place du Parlement

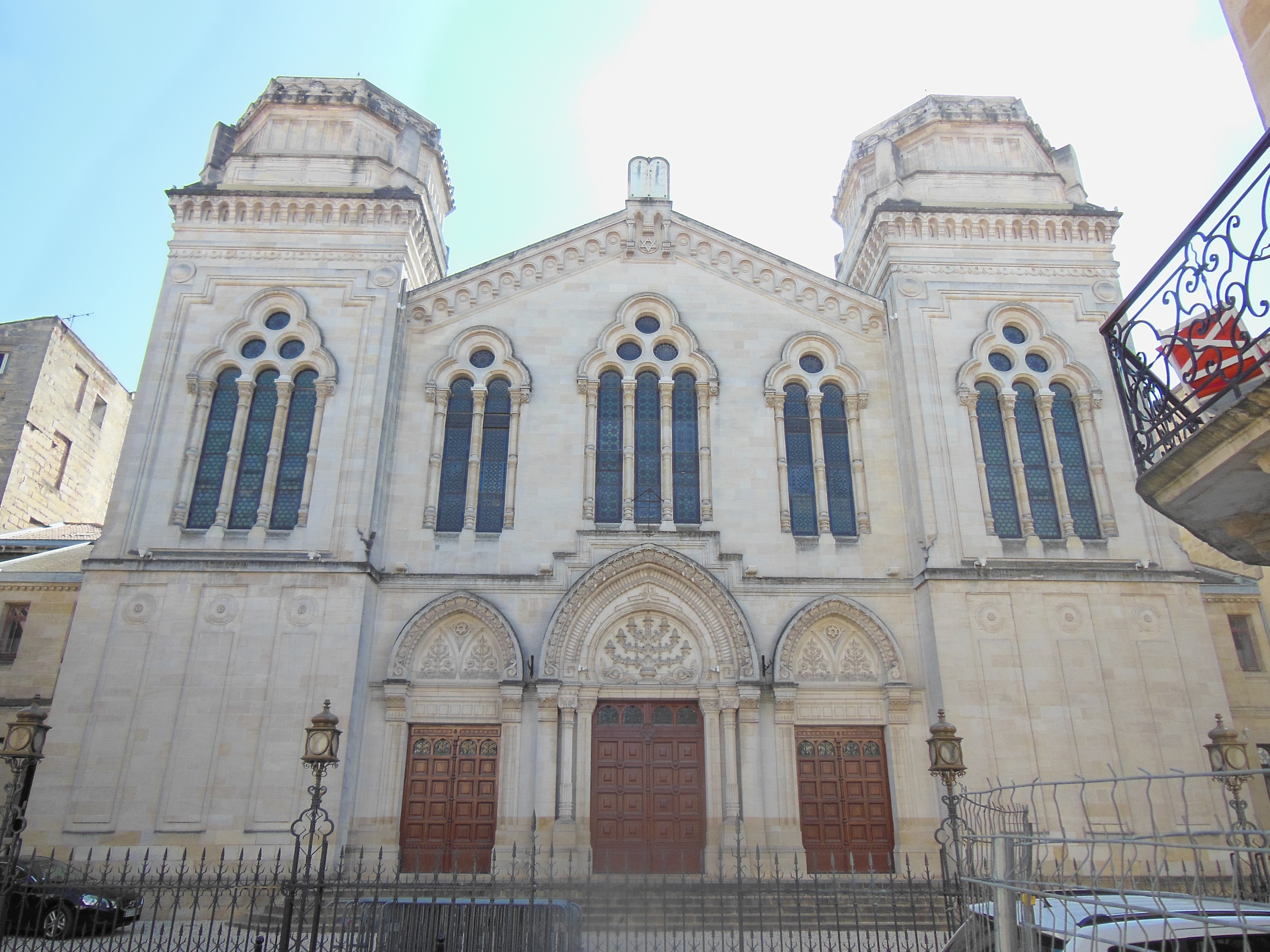
The Grand Synagogue

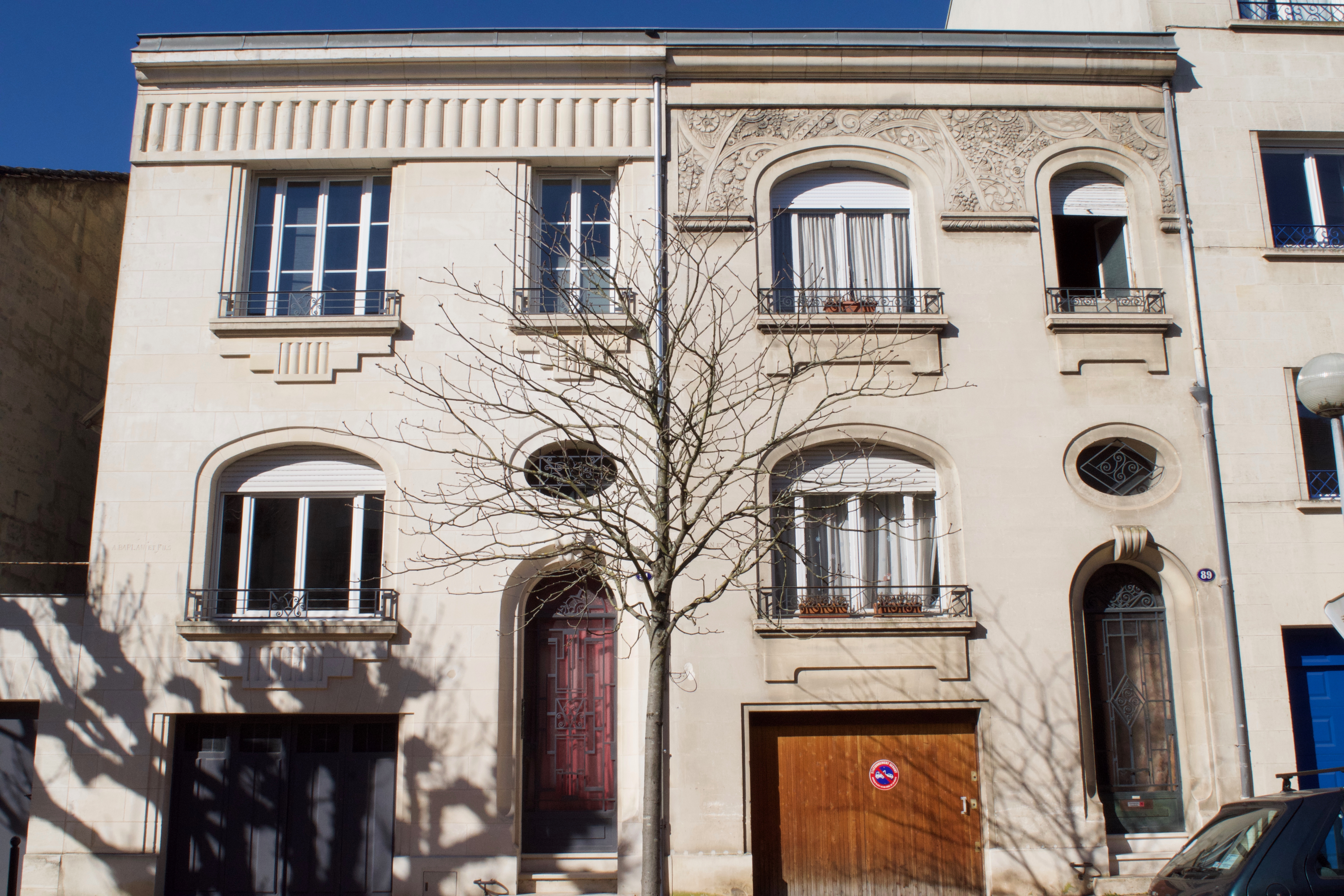
Facades of the Art déco district

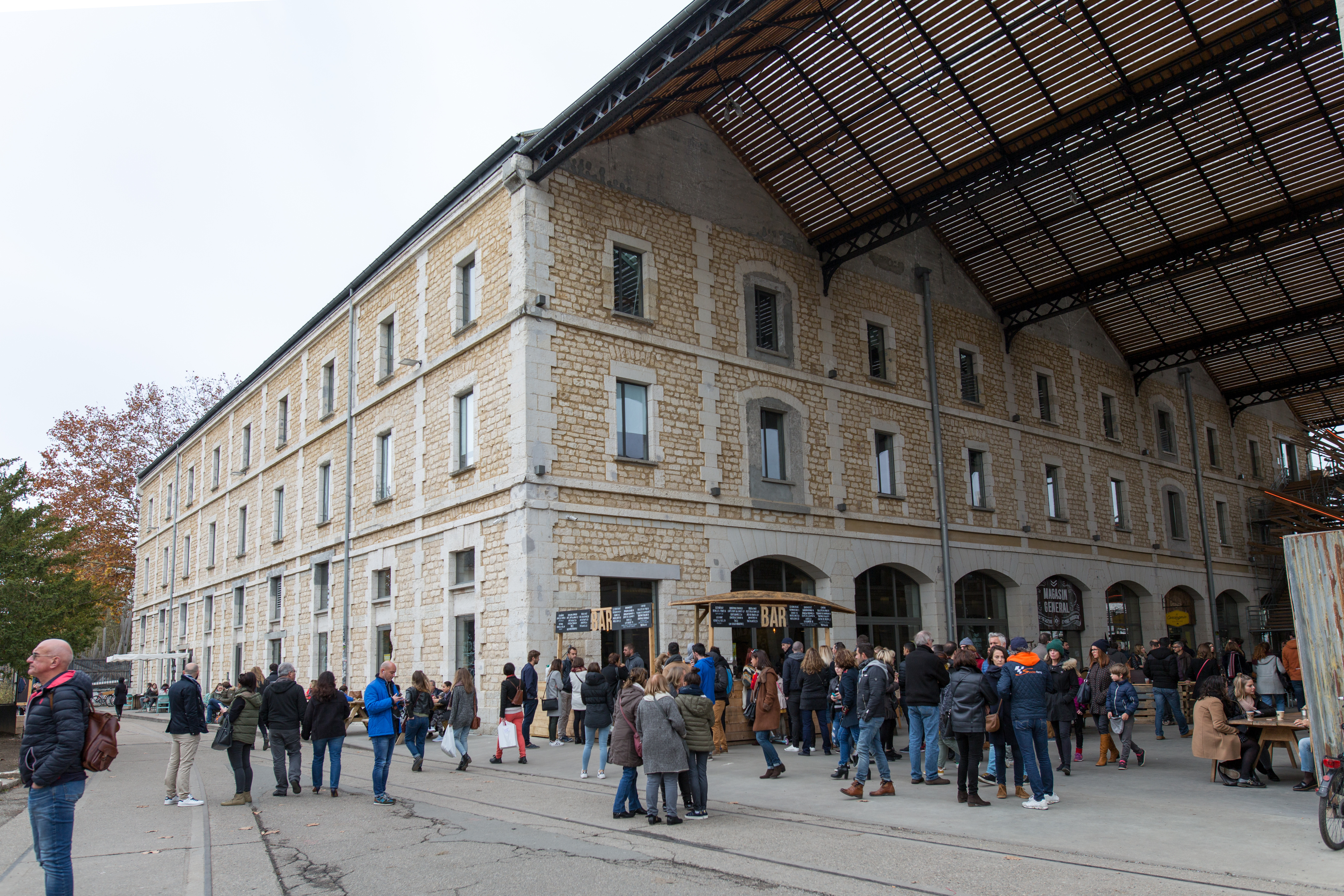
Darwin district

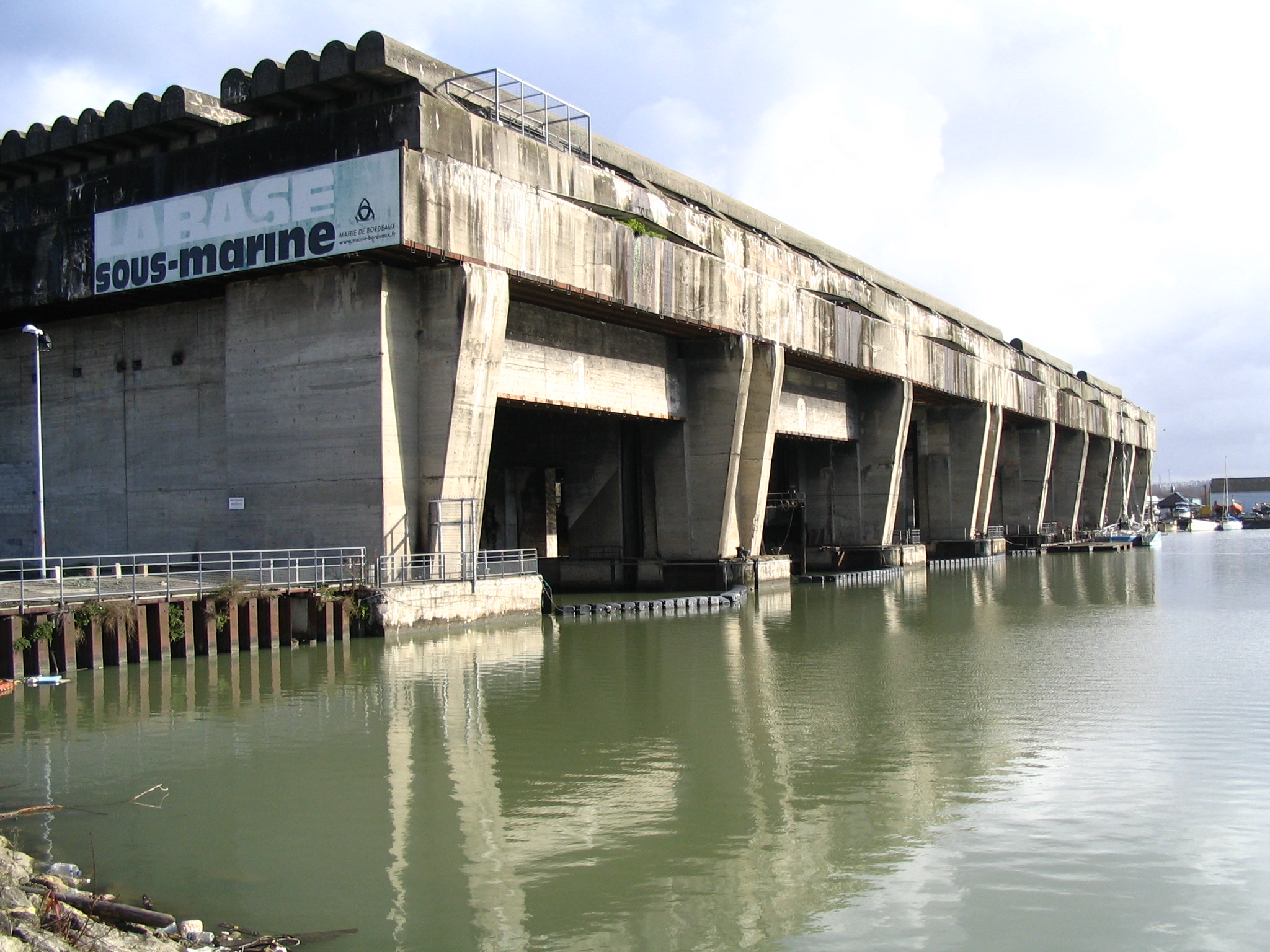
Submarine Pen

Contemporary buildings in contemporary architectural style include:

- Cité Frugès, district of Pessac, built by Le Corbusier, 1924–1926, listed as UNESCO heritage
- Fire Station, la Benauge, Claude Ferret/Adrien Courtois/Yves Salier, 1951–1954
- Mériadeck district, 1960–70's
- Court of first instance, Richard Rogers, 1998
- CTBA, wood and furniture research center, A. Loisier, 1998
- Hangar 14 on the Quai des Chartrons, 1999
- The Management Science faculty on the Bastide, Anne Lacaton/Jean-Philippe Vassal, 2006
- The Jardin botanique de la Bastide, Catherine Mosbach/Françoise Hélène Jourda/Pascal Convert, 2007
- The Nuyens School complex on the Bastide, Yves Ballot/Nathalie Franck, 2007
- Seeko'o Hotel on the Quai de Bacalan, King Kong architects, 2007
- Atlantique stadium, Herzog & de Meuron, 2015
- Cité du Vin, XTU architects, Anouk Legendre & Nicolas Desmazières, 2016
- MECA, Maison de l'Économie Créative et de la culture de la Région Nouvelle-Aquitaine, Bjarke Ingels, 2019
Cité Frugès de Pessac

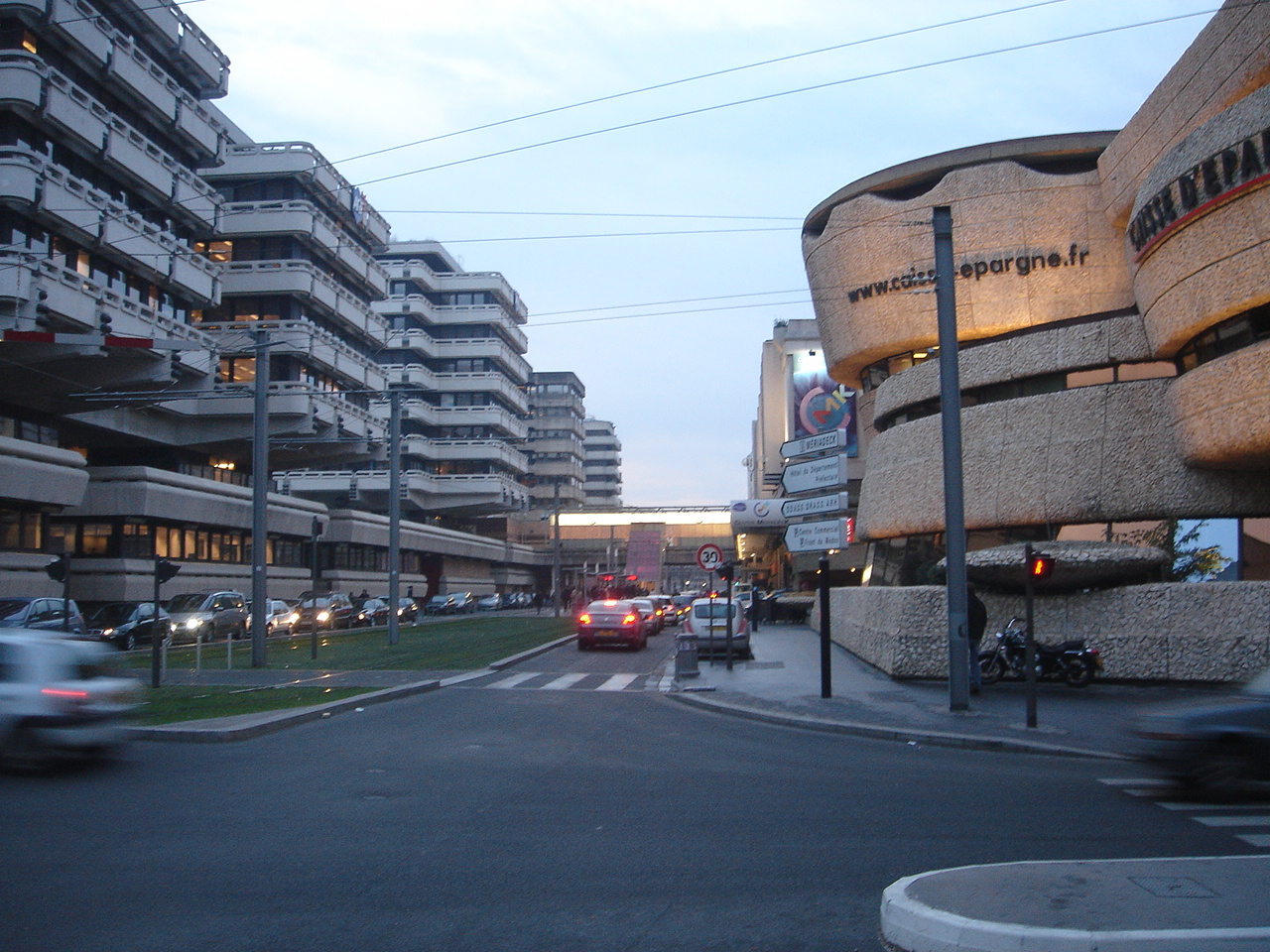
Mériadeck district

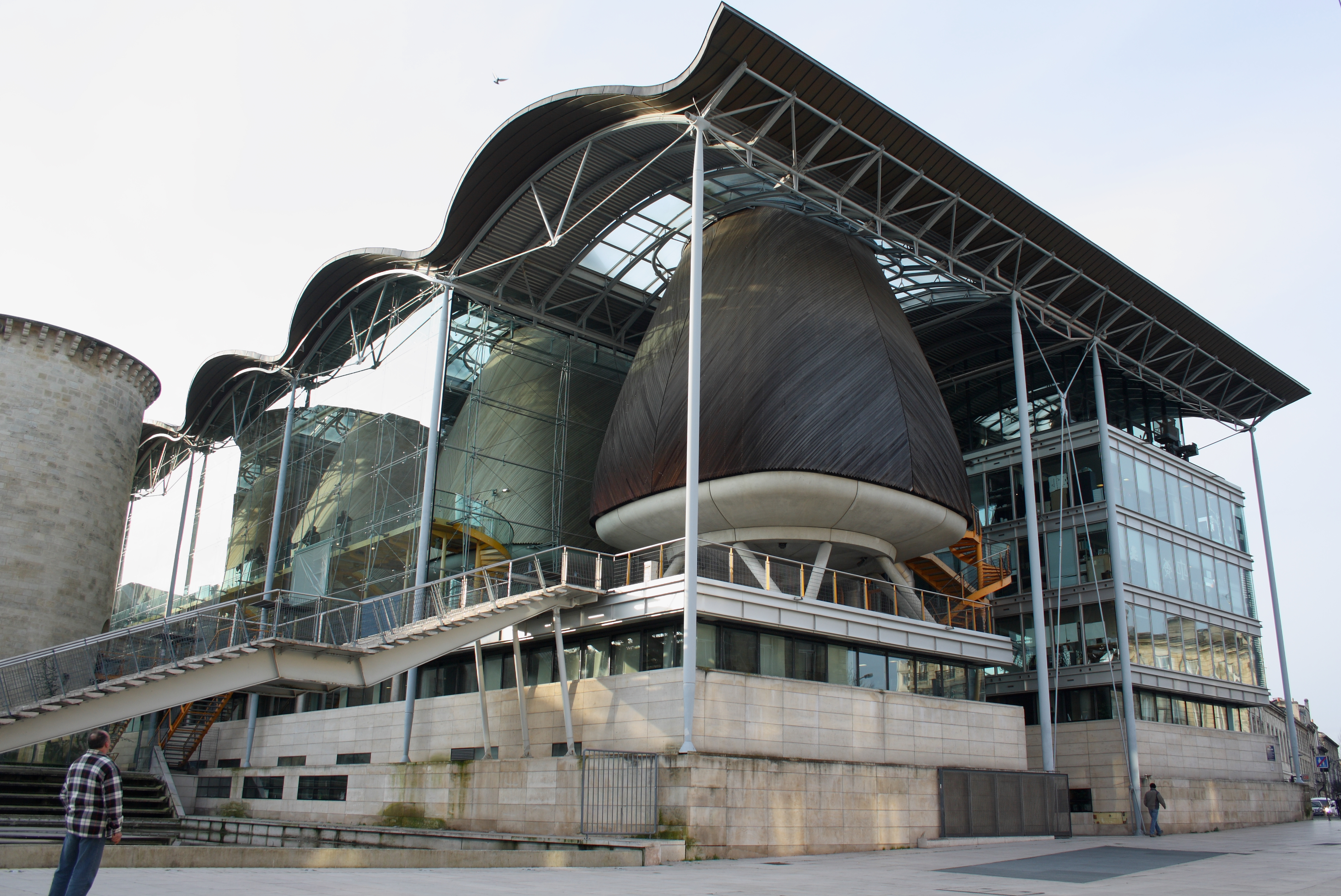
Court of first instance

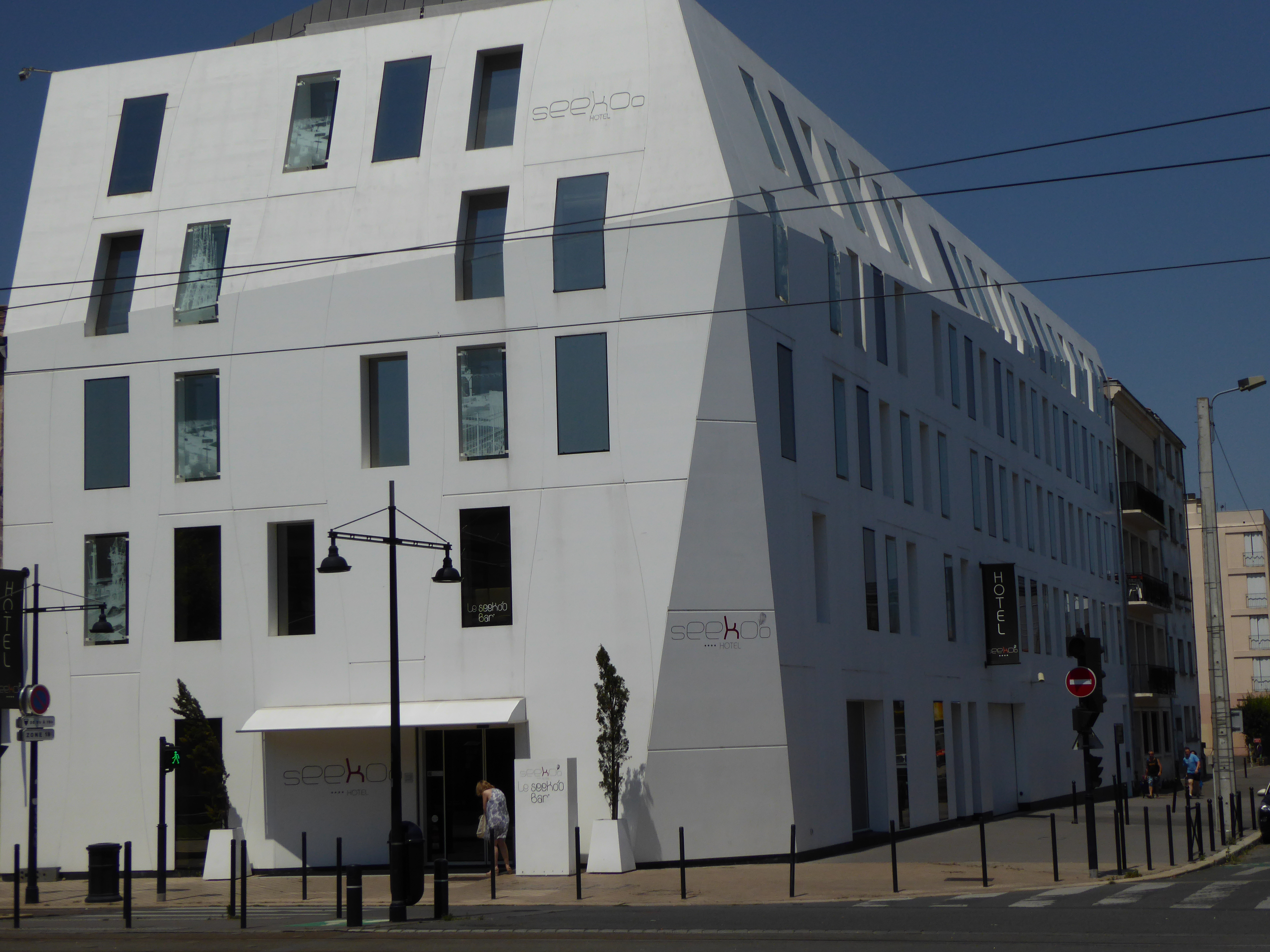
Seeko'o hotel

Cité du Vin

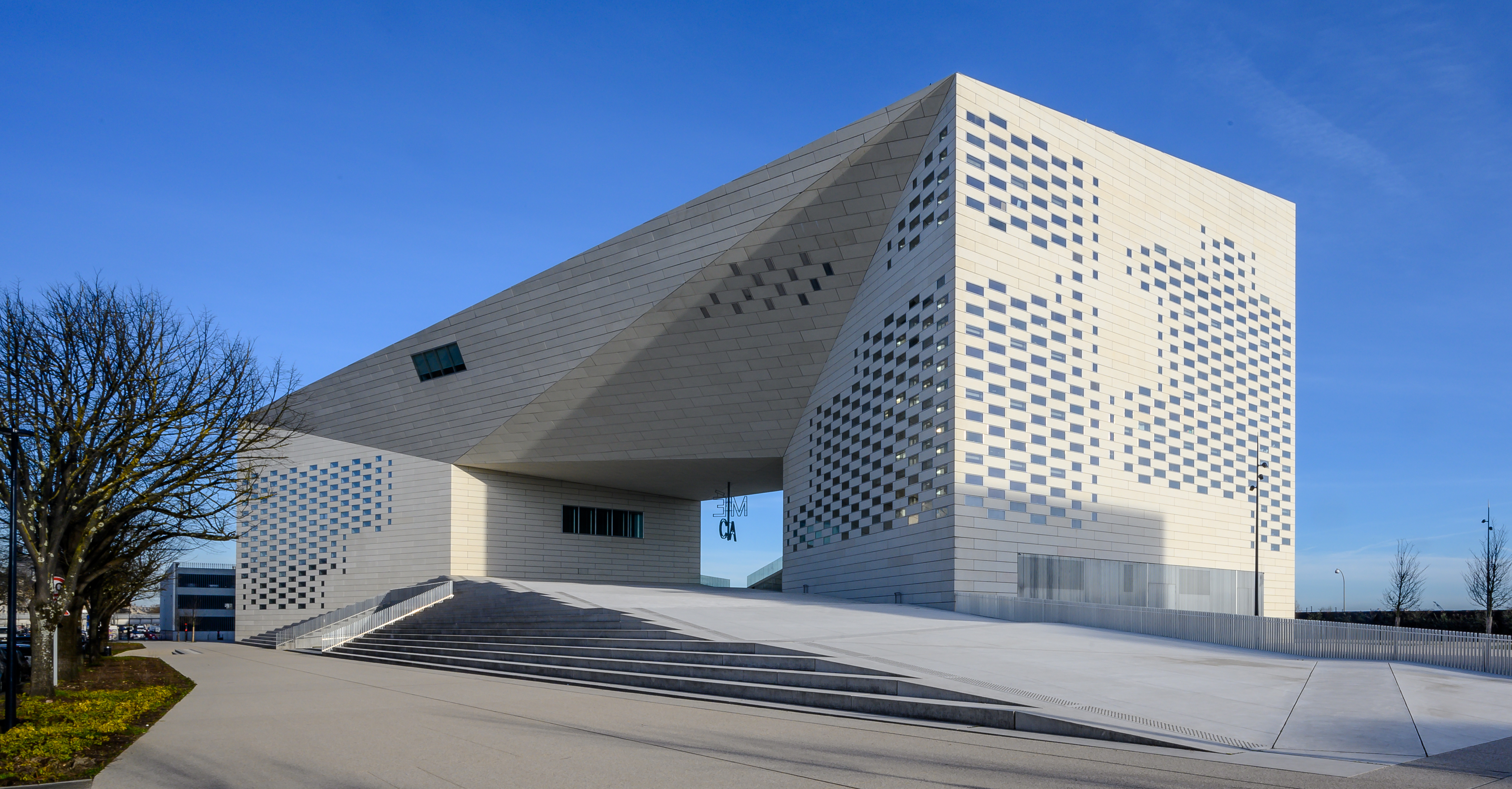
MECA

=== Museums ===
- Musée des Beaux-Arts (Fine arts museum), one of the finest painting galleries in France with paintings by painter such as Tiziano, Veronese, Rubens, Van Dyck, Frans Hals, Claude, Chardin, Delacroix, Renoir, Seurat, Redon, Matisse and Picasso.
- Musée d'Aquitaine (archeological and history museum)
- Musée du Vin et du Négoce (museum of the wine trade)
- Musée des Arts Décoratifs et du Design (museum of decorative arts and design)
- Musée d'Histoire Naturelle (natural history museum)
- Musée Mer Marine (Sea and Navy museum)
- Cité du Vin
- CAPC musée d'art contemporain de Bordeaux (modern art museum)
- Musée national des douanes (history of French customs)
- Bordeaux Patrimoine Mondial (architectural and heritage interpretation centre)
- Musée d'ethnologie (ethnology museum)
- Institut culturel Bernard Magrez, modern and streetart museum into an 18th-century mansion
- Cervantez Institute (into the house of Goya)
- Cap Sciences
- Centre Jean Moulin
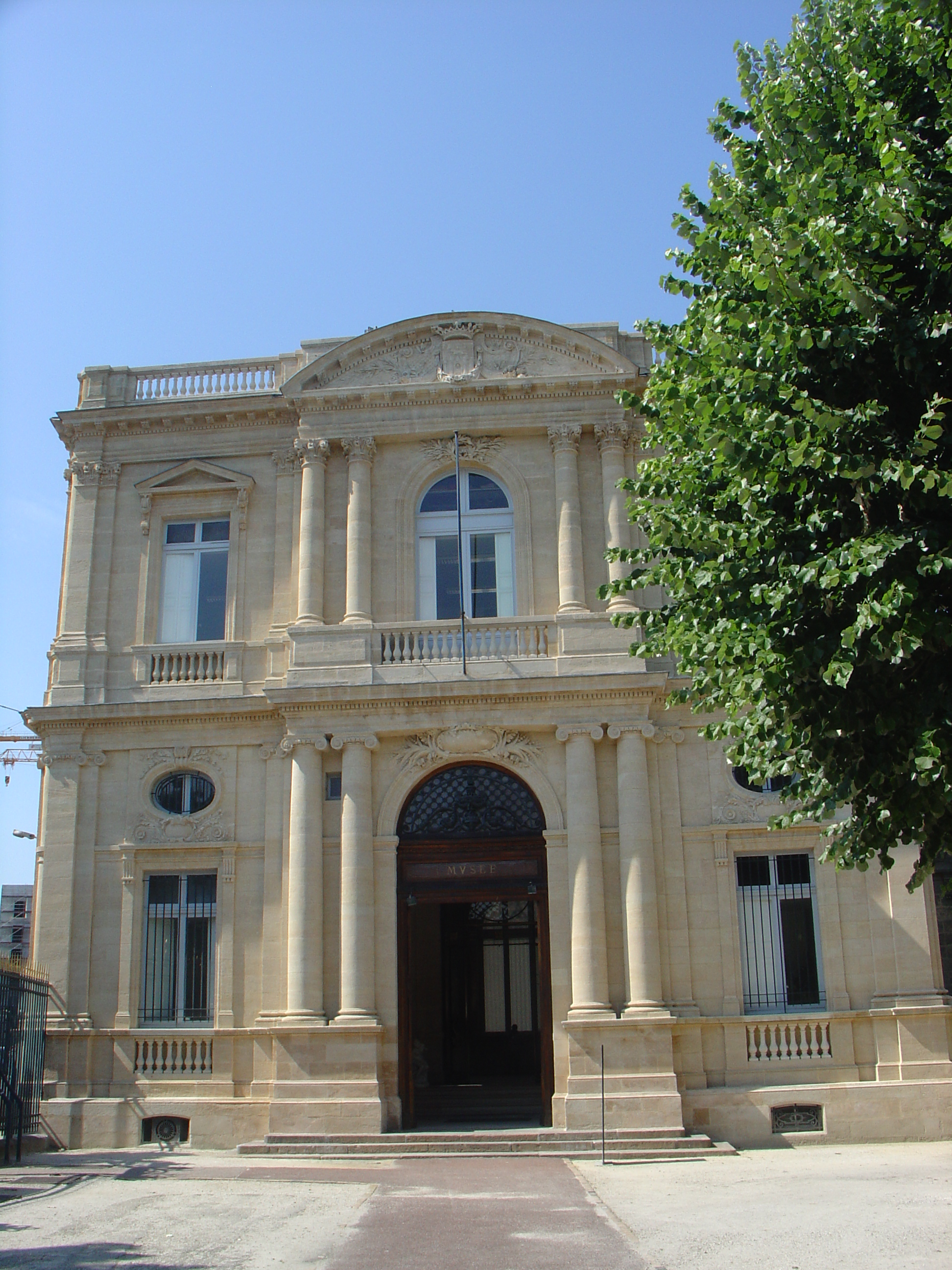
Musée des Beaux-Arts

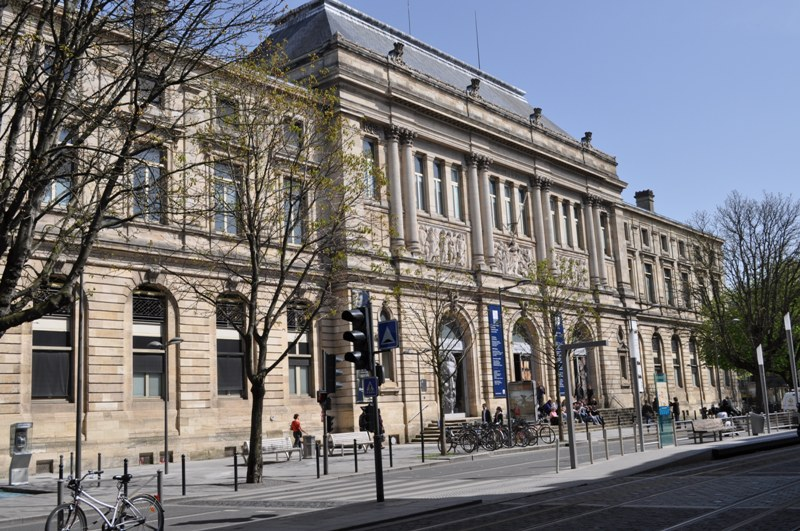
Musée d'Aquitaine

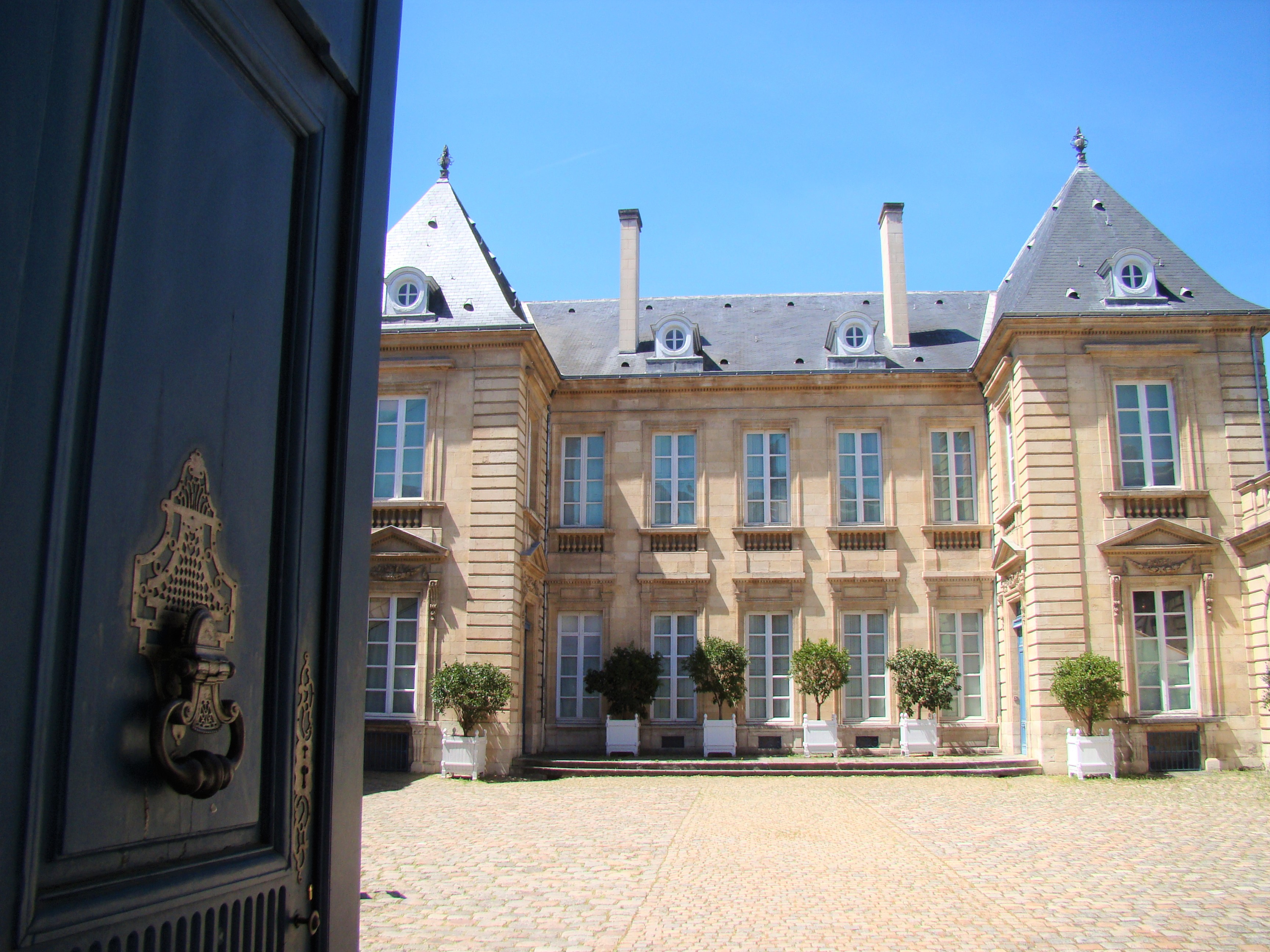
Musée des Arts Décoratifs et du Design

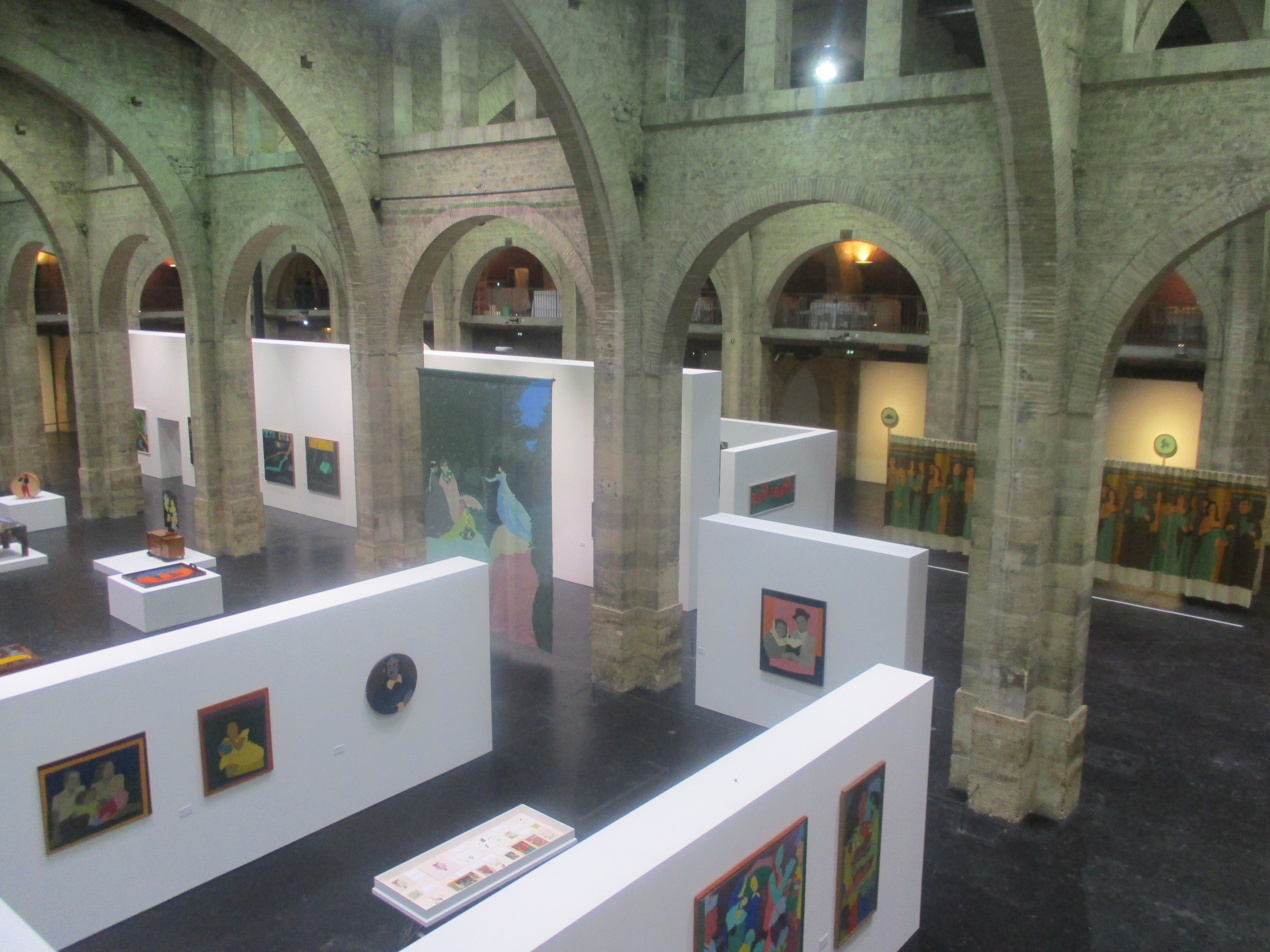
CAPC musée d'art contemporain de Bordeaux

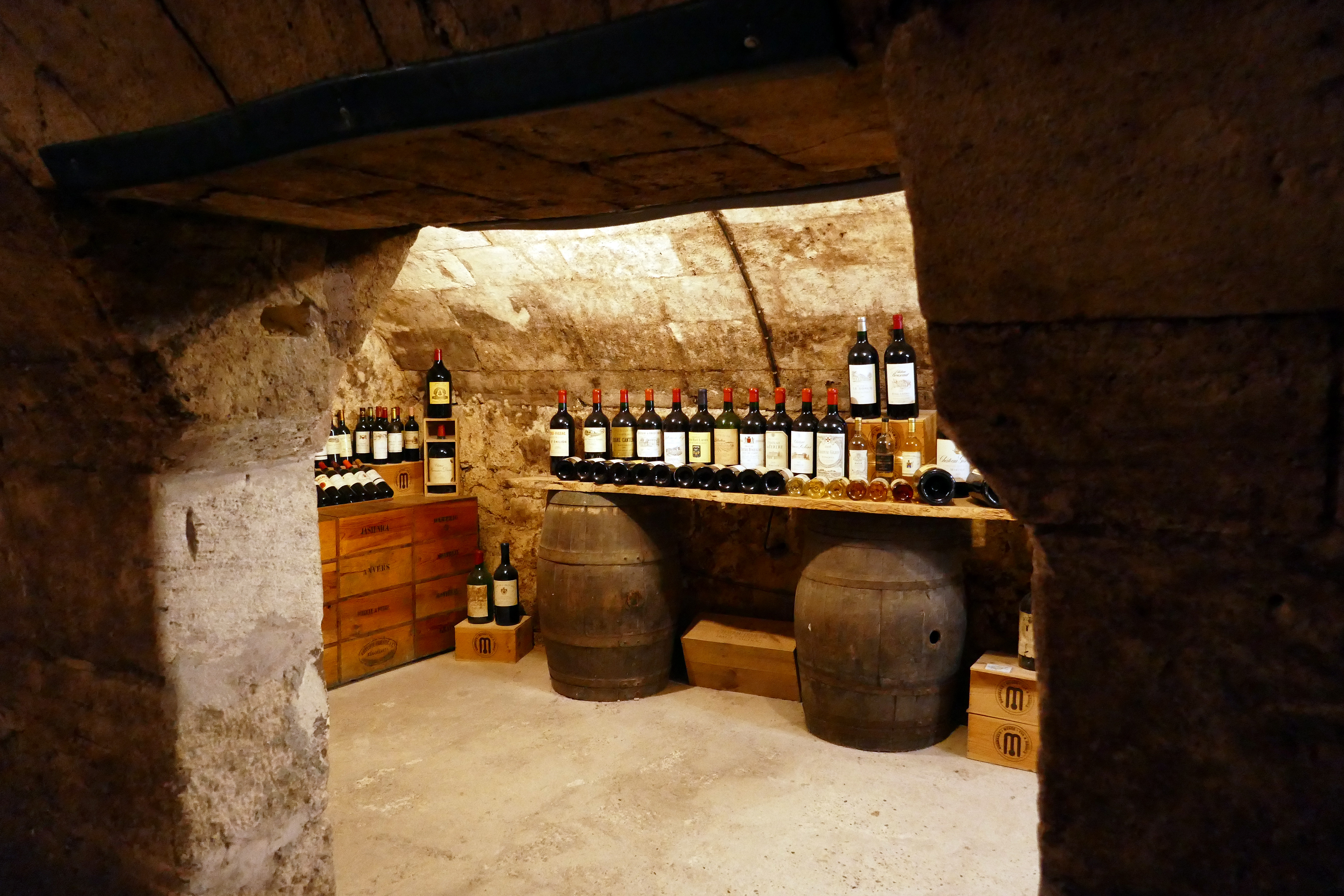
Musée du vin et du négoce de Bordeaux

=== Slavery memorials ===
Slavery was part of a growing drive for the city. During the 18th and 19th centuries, Bordeaux was an important slave port, which saw some 500 slave expeditions that cause the deportation of 150,000 Africans by Bordeaux shipowners. Secondly, even though the "Triangular trade" represented only 5% of Bordeaux's wealth, the city's direct trade with the Caribbean, that accounted for the other 95%, concerns the colonial stuffs made by the slave (sugar, coffee, cocoa). And thirdly, in that same period, a major migratory movement by Aquitanians took place to the Caribbean colonies, with Saint-Domingue (now Haiti) being the most popular destination. 40% of the white population of the island came from Aquitaine. They prospered with plantations incomes, until the first slave revolts which concluded in 1848 in the final abolition of slavery in France.

A number of traces and memorial sites are visible in the city. Moreover, thanks to pressure exerted by Karfa Diallo's association, the municipality of Bordeaux installed a commemorative plaque on the quays, from where the first slave ship departed, and entrusted the Musée d'Aquitaine with the opening of four permanent rooms dedicated to the Bordeaux history of Atlantic trade and colonial slavery.

A statue of Modeste Testas, an Ethiopian woman who was enslaved by the Bordeaux-based Testas brothers, was unveiled in 2019. She was trafficked by them from West Africa, to Philadelphia (where one of the brothers coerced her to have two children by him) and was ultimately freed and lived in Haiti. The bronze sculpture was created by the Haitian artist Woodly Caymitte.

The region of Bordeaux was also the land of several prominent abolitionists, as Montesquieu, Laffon de Ladébat and Elisée Reclus. Others were members of the Society of the Friends of the Blacks as the revolutionaries Boyer-Fonfrède, Gensonné, Guadet and Ducos.

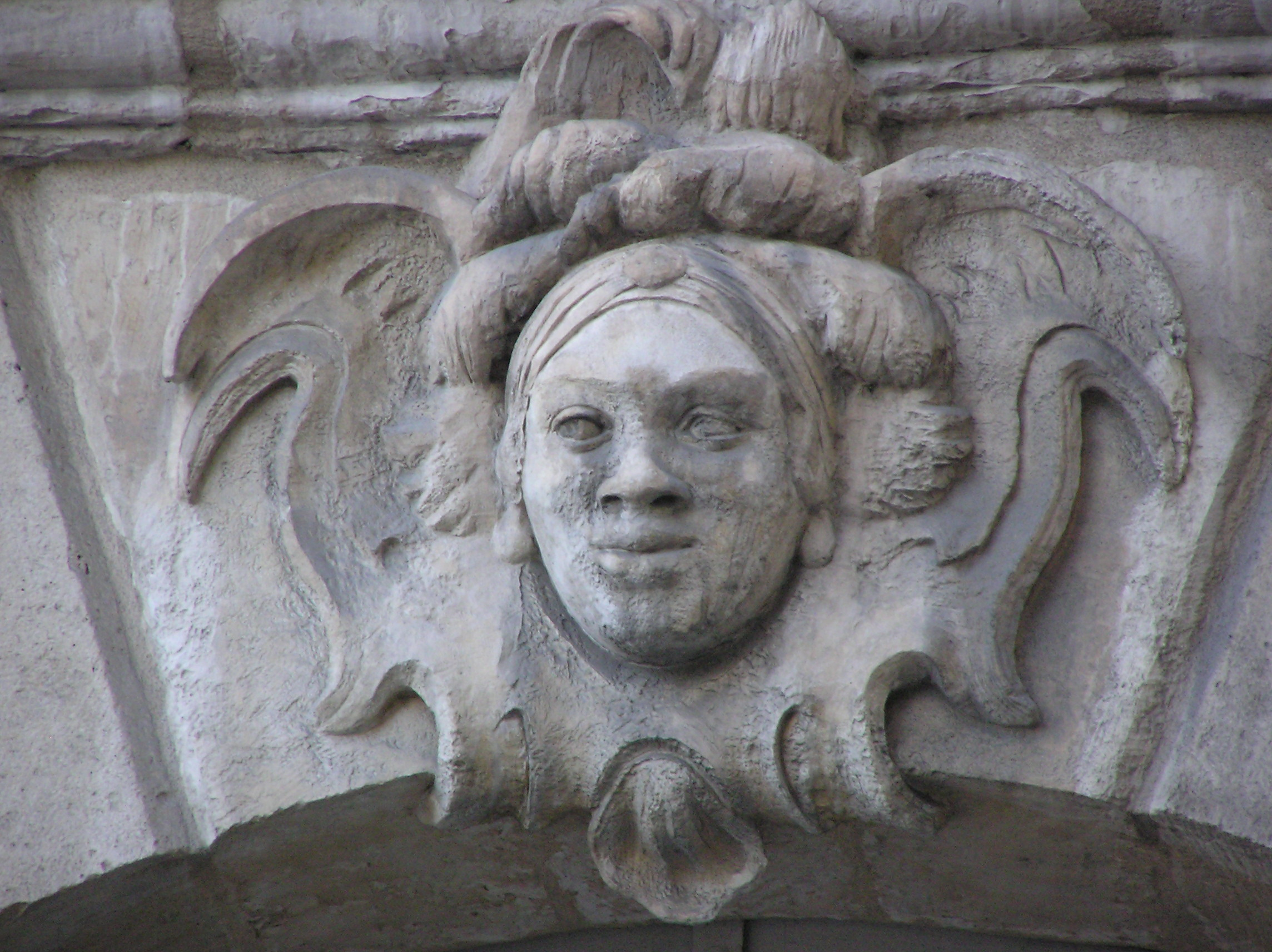
African face mascaron on the place de la Bourse

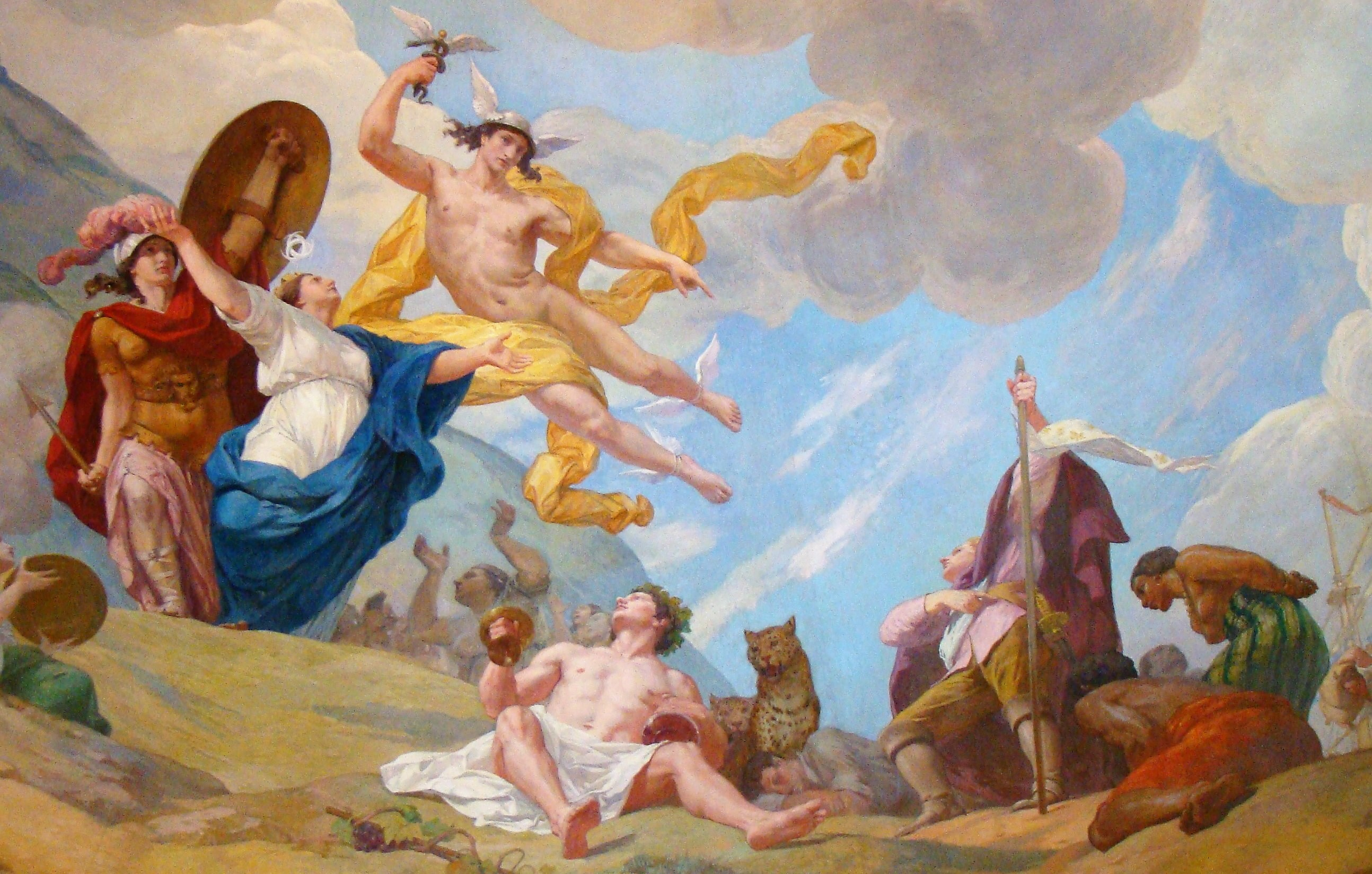
Allegory of Bordeaux and her wealth, including two African slaves, ceiling of the Grand-Théâtre de Bordeaux

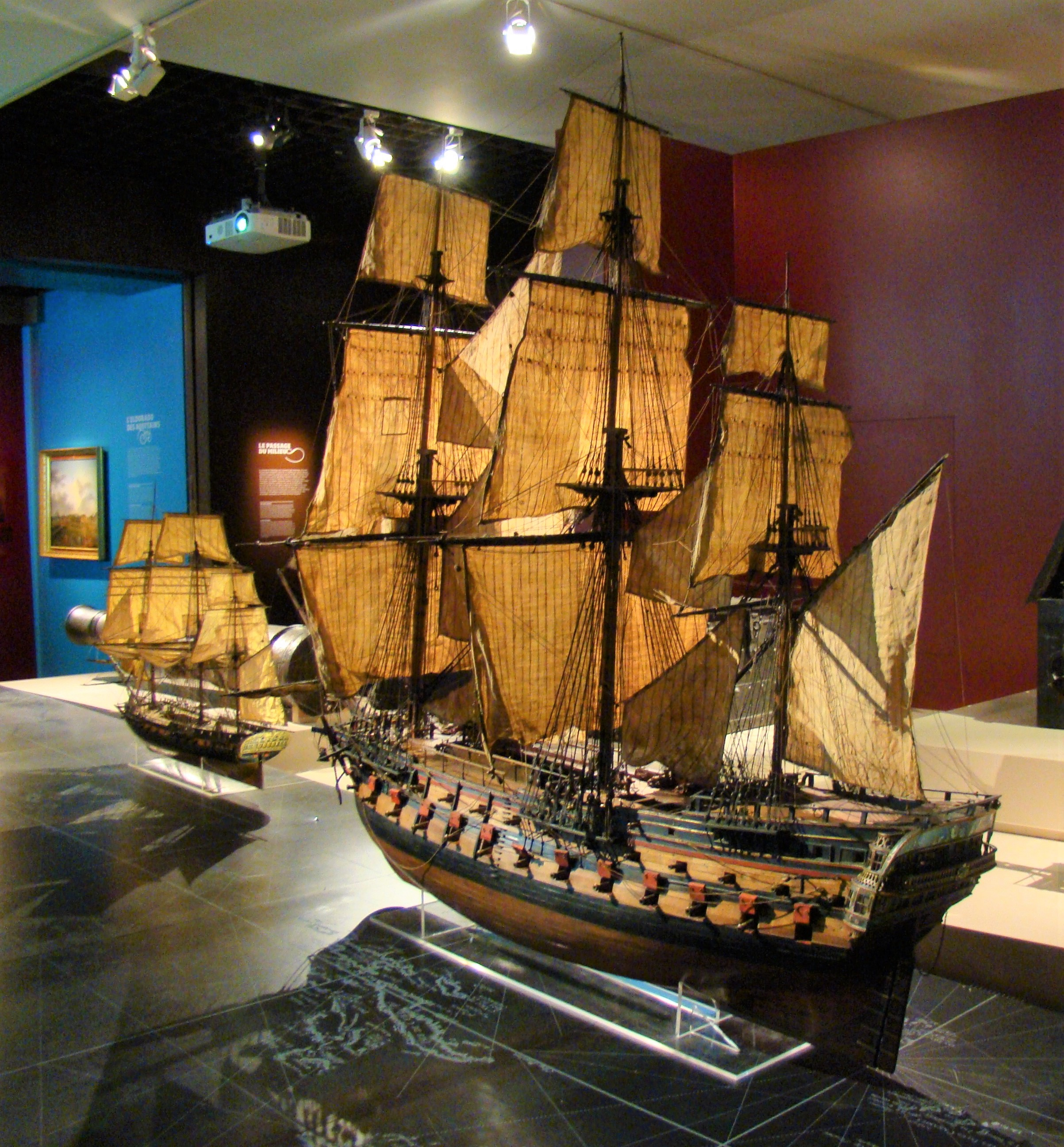
Spaces dedicated to slave trade, Musée d'Aquitaine

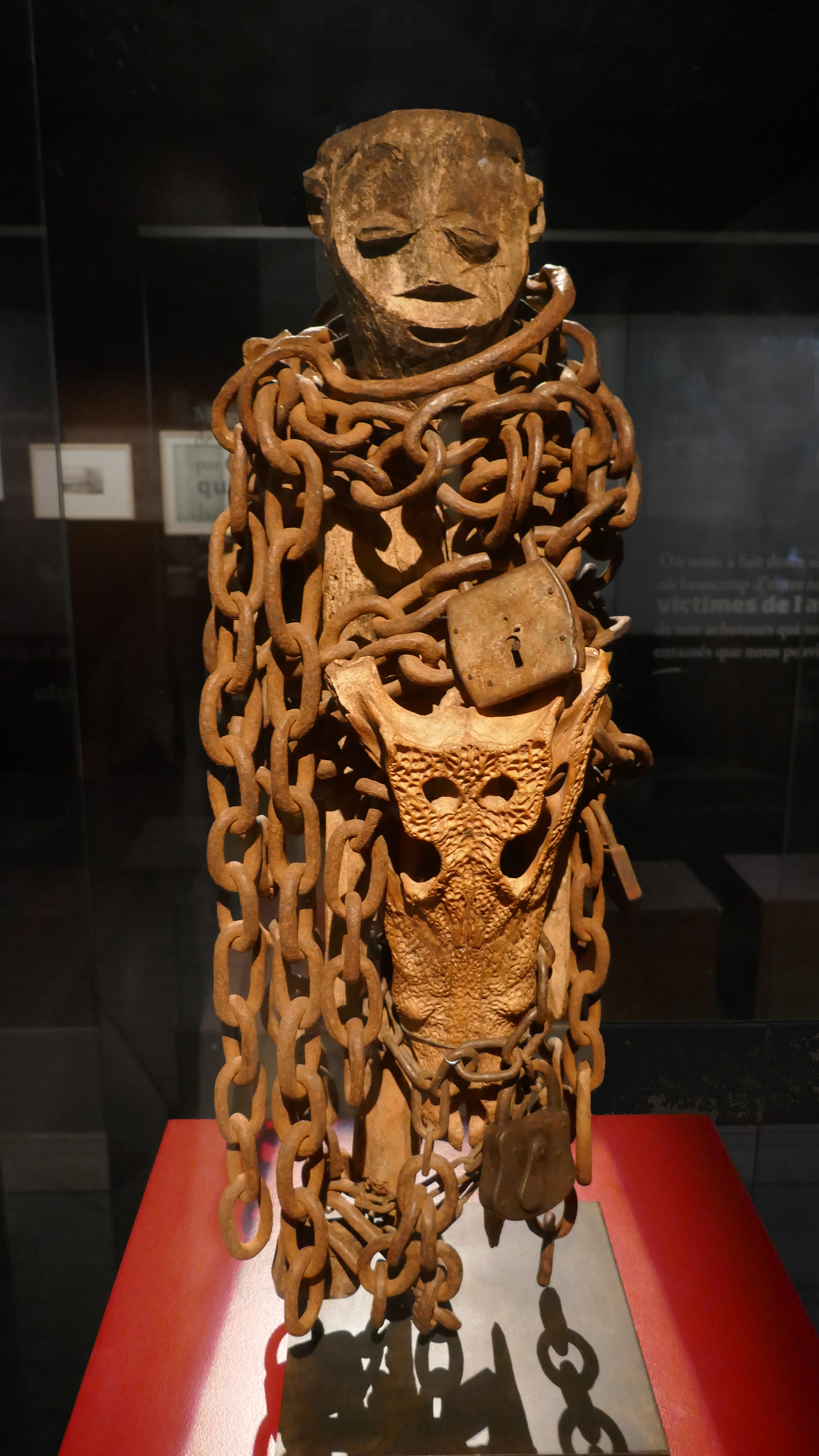
Fon fetish, Musée d'Aquitaine

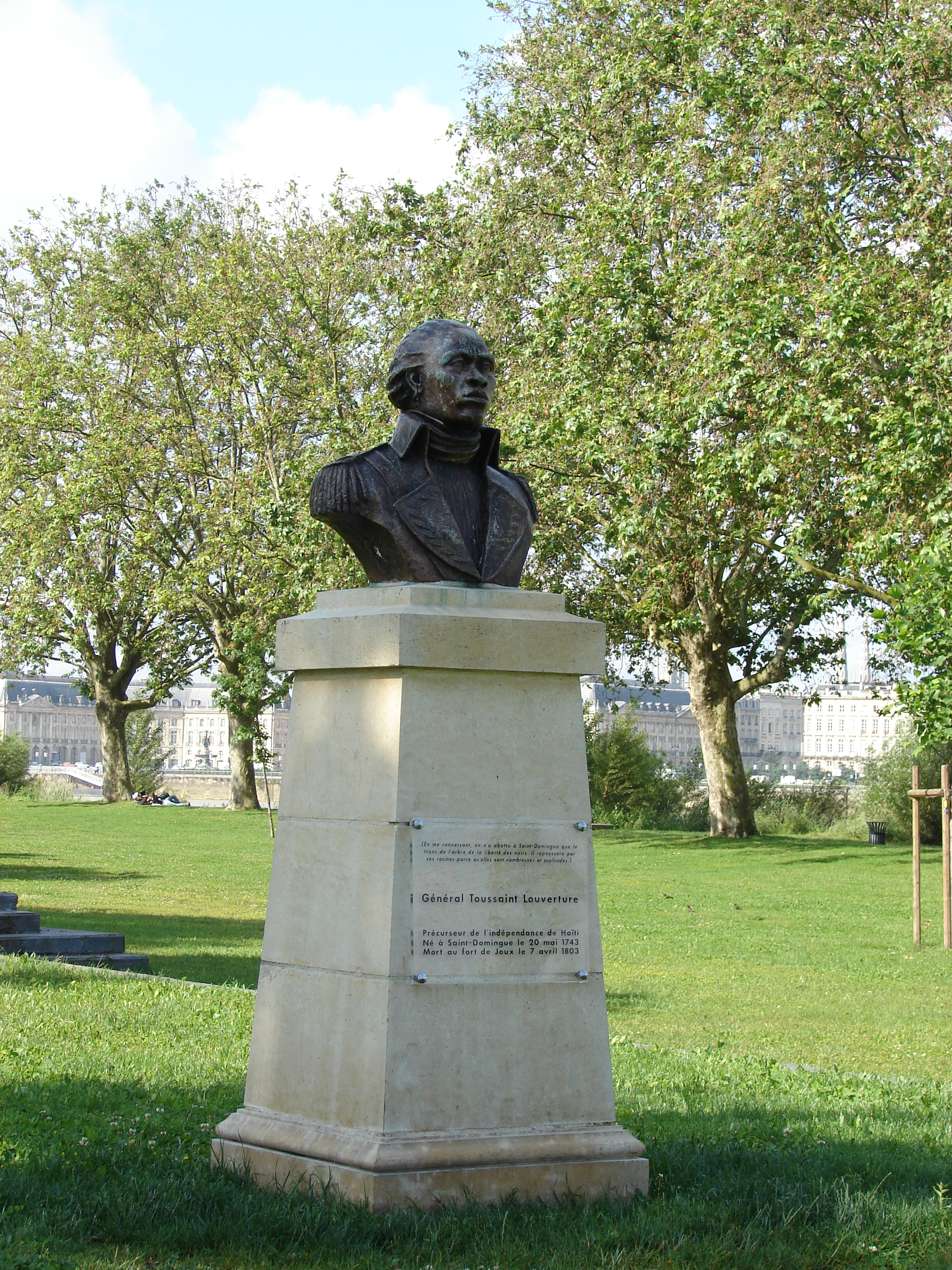
Bronze bust of Toussaint Louverture

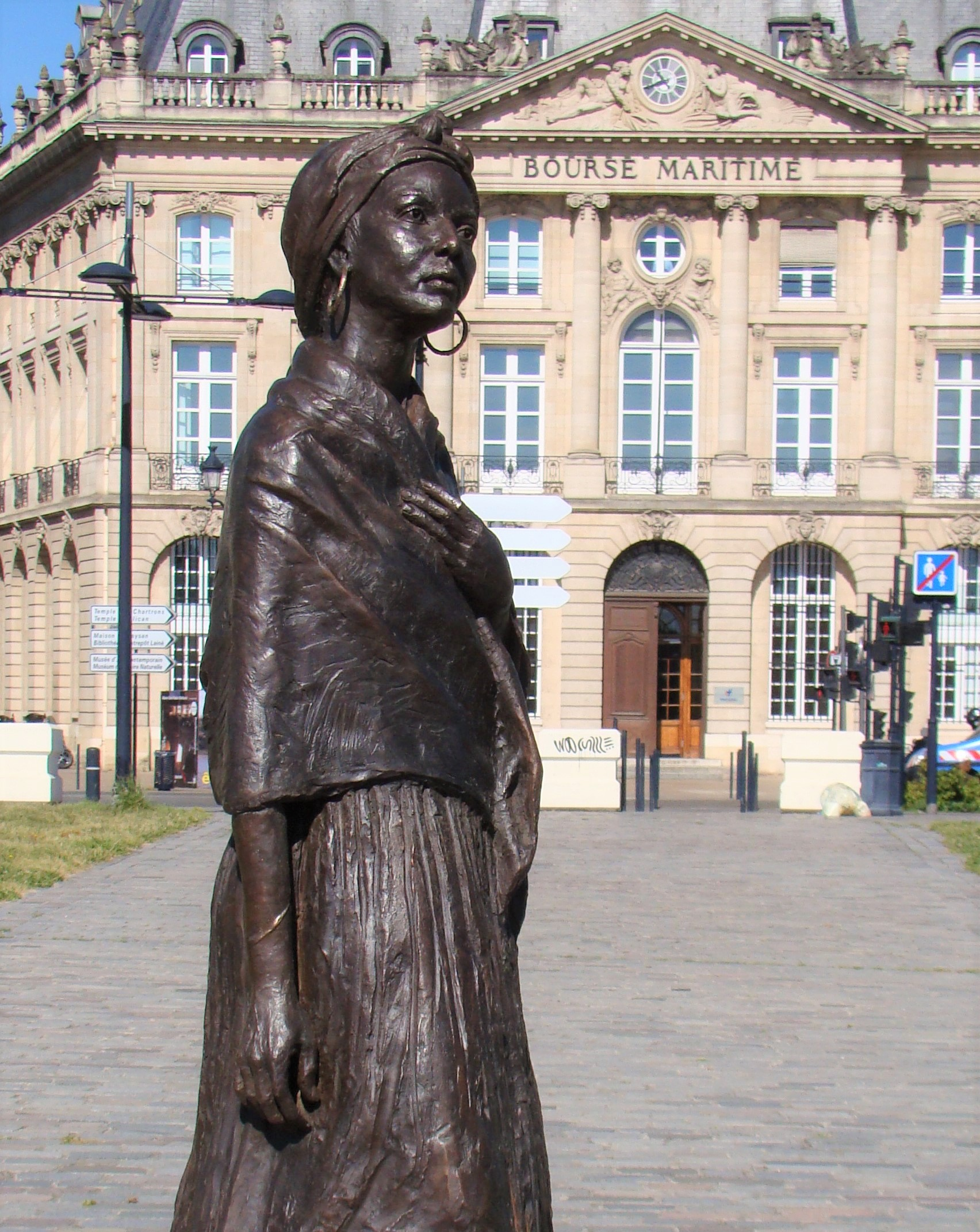
Bronze Statue of Modeste Testas, Ethiopian woman enslaved by two Bordeaux plantation owners

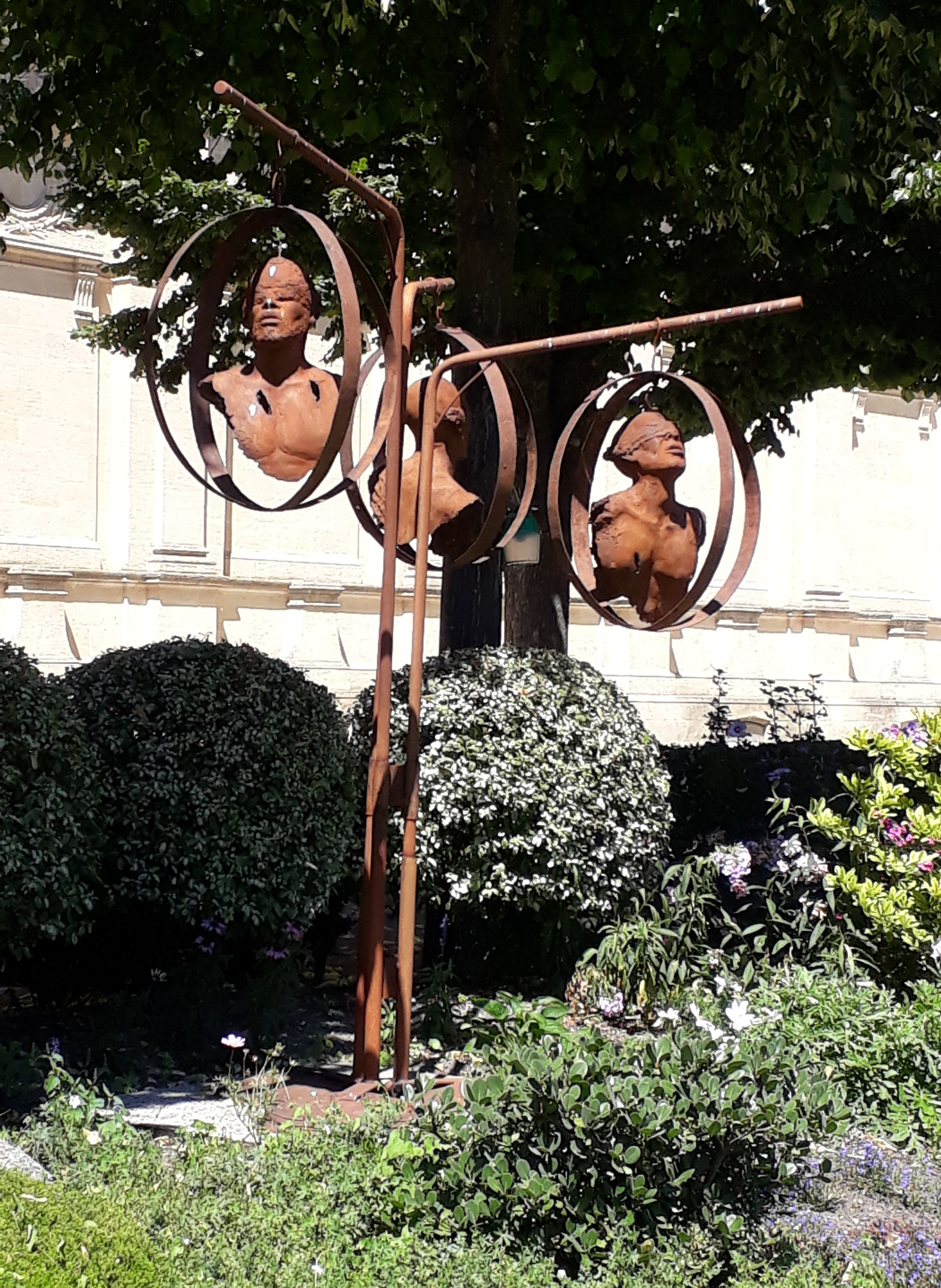
Strange Fruit, in the town hall garden, a sculpture evoking anger, fear, and abandonment caused by the slave trade

=== Parks and gardens ===
- Jardin public de Bordeaux, which contains the Jardin botanique de Bordeaux
- Jardin botanique de la Bastide
- Parc bordelais
- Parc aux Angéliques
- Jardin des Lumières
- Parc Rivière
- Parc Floral
- Parc Bühler
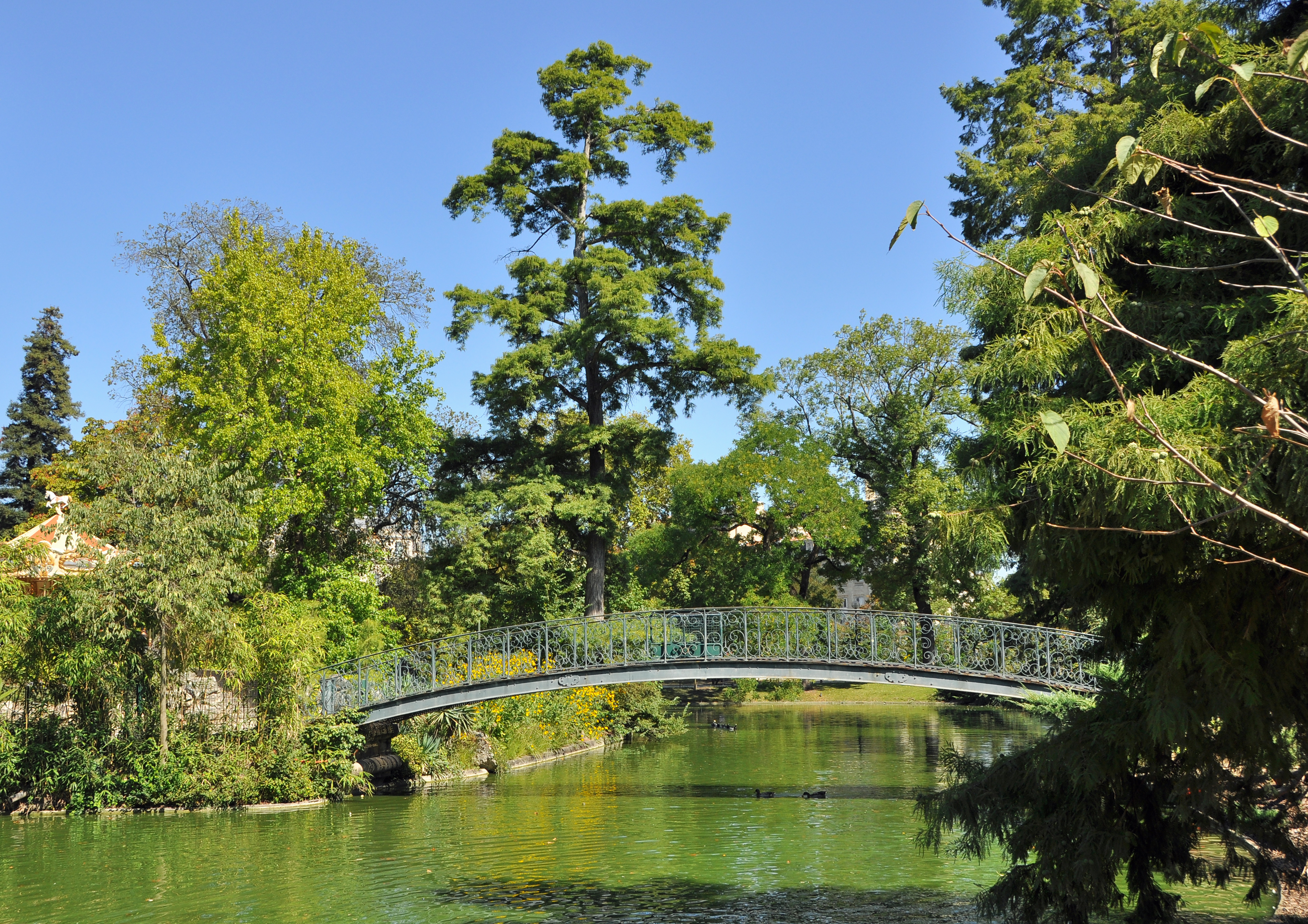
Jardin public

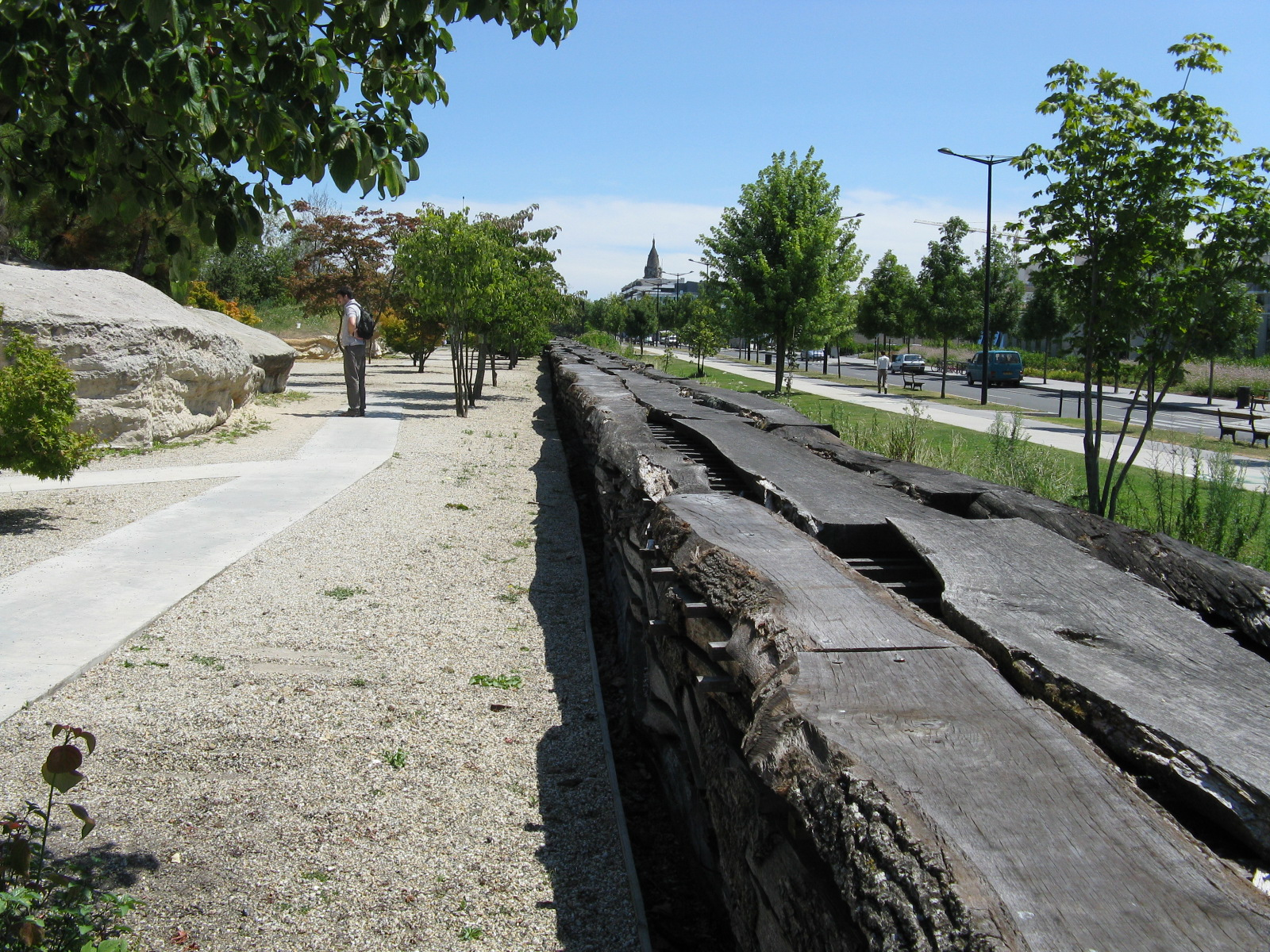
Jardin botanique

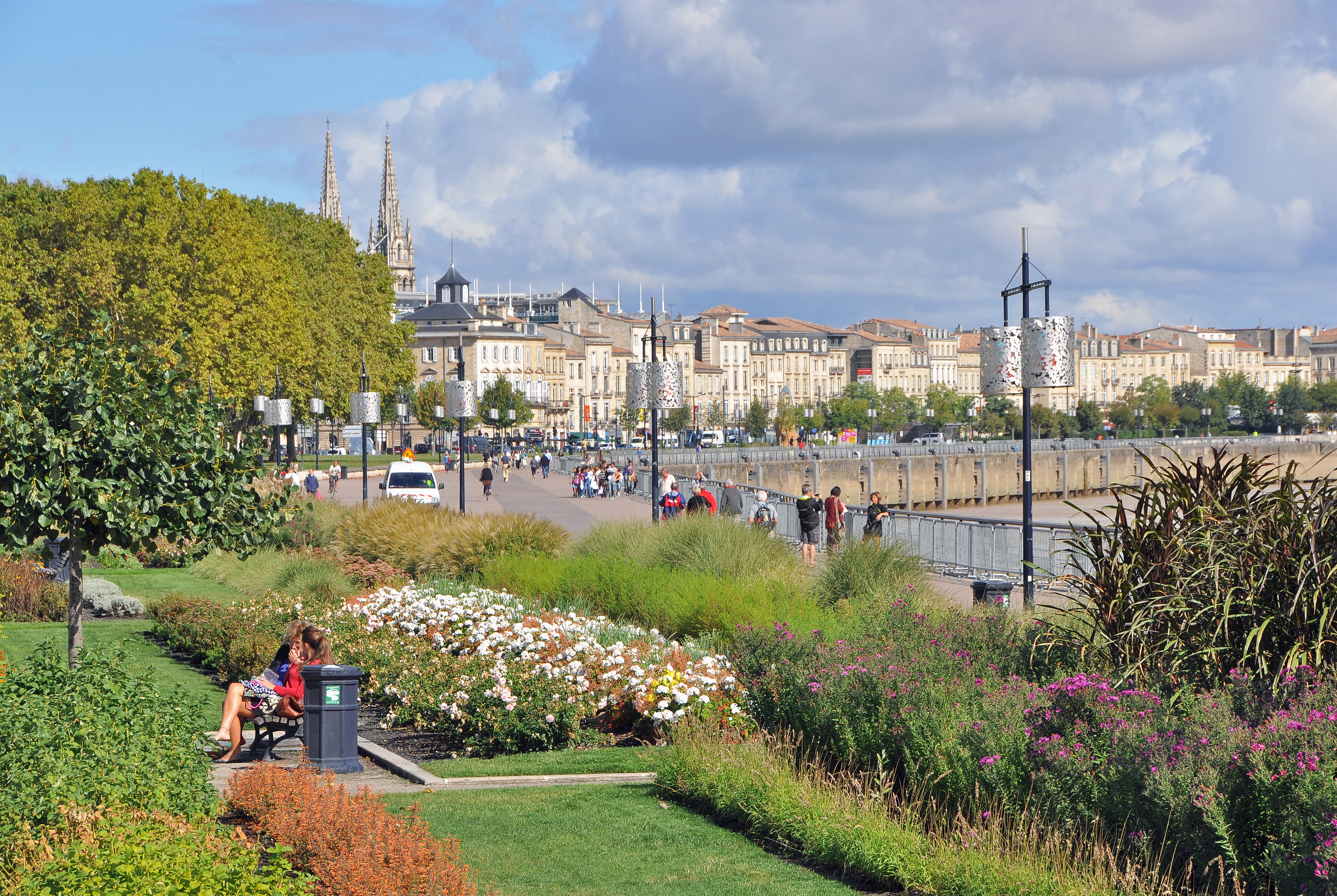
Jardin des Lumières

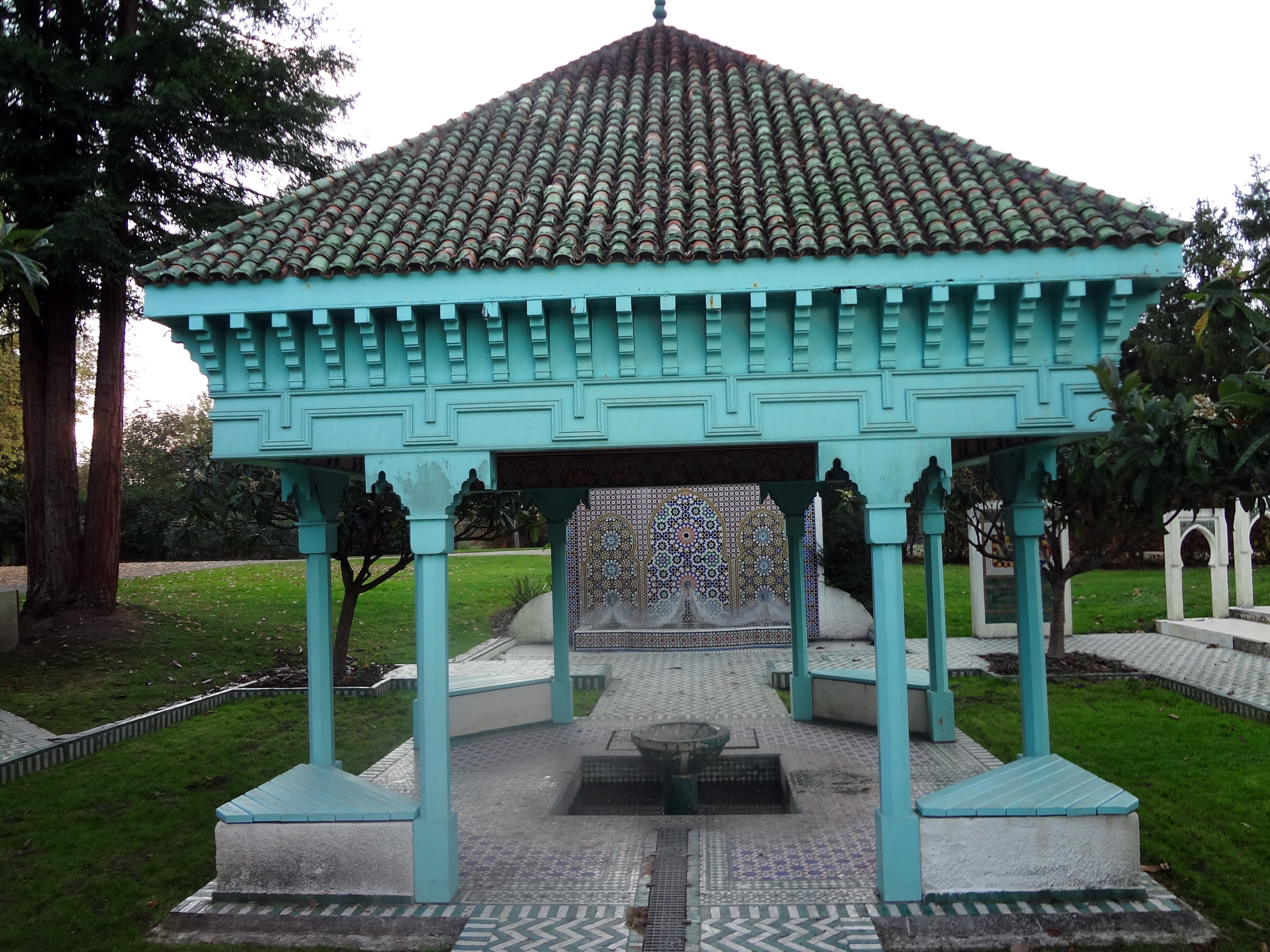
Parc floral, Casablanca pavilion

=== Pont Jacques Chaban-Delmas ===
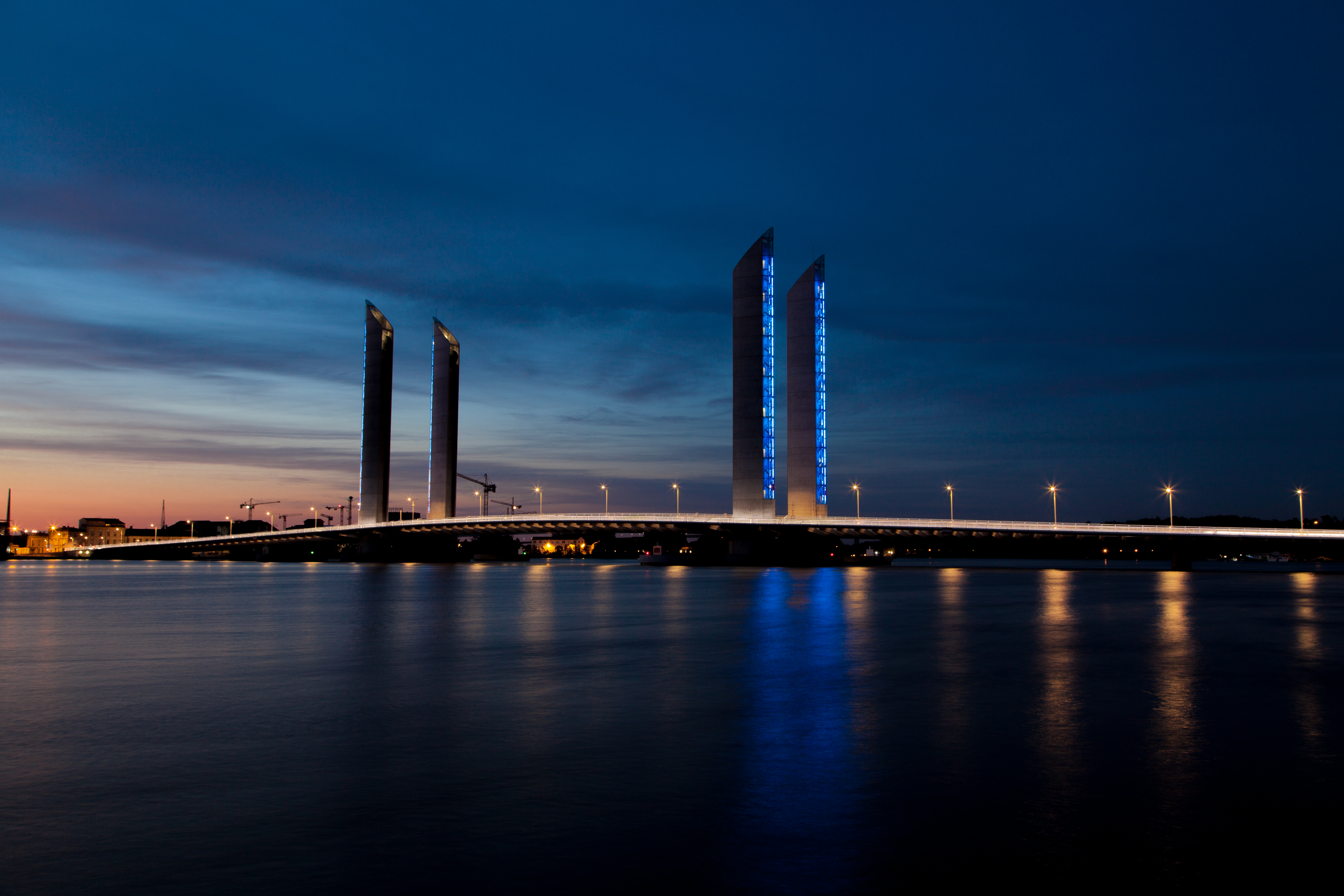
Chaban Delmas bridge

Europe's longest and tallest vertical-lift bridge, the Pont Jacques Chaban-Delmas, was opened in 2013 in Bordeaux, spanning the River Garonne. The central lift span is 117-metre-long (384-foot), weighs 4,600 tons and can be lifted vertically up to 53 metres (174 feet) to let tall ships pass underneath. The €160 million bridge was inaugurated by President François Hollande and Mayor Alain Juppé on 16 March 2013. The bridge was named after the late Jacques Chaban-Delmas, who was a former Prime Minister and Mayor of Bordeaux.

=== Shopping ===
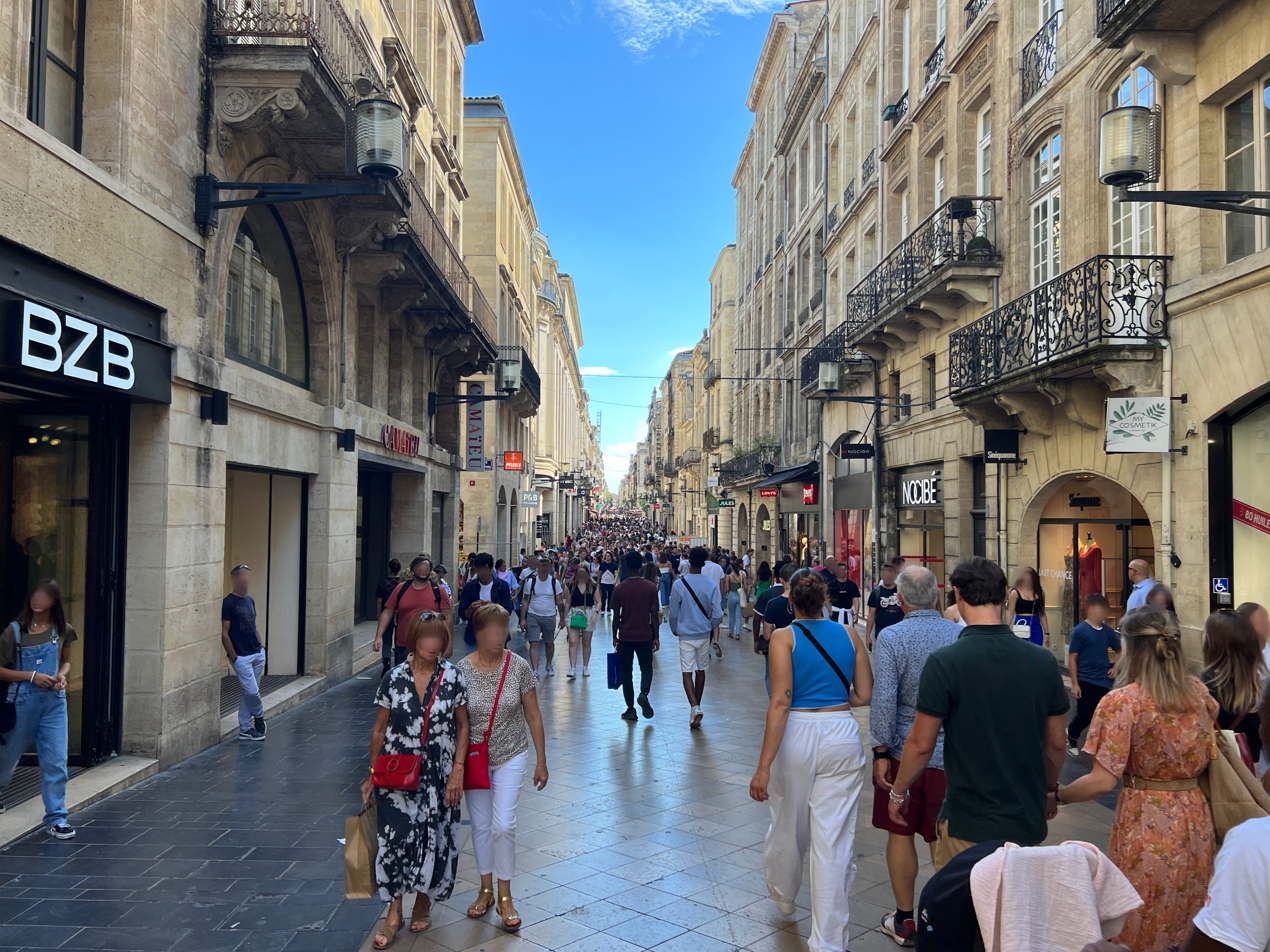
Rue Sainte-Catherine

Bordeaux has many shopping options. In the heart of Bordeaux is Rue Sainte-Catherine. This pedestrianised street has 1.2 kilometers (0.75 mi) of shops, restaurants and cafés; it is also one of the longest shopping streets in Europe. Rue Sainte-Catherine starts at Place de la Victoire and ends at Place de la Comédie by the Grand Théâtre. The shops become progressively more upmarket as one moves towards Place de la Comédie and the nearby Cours de l'Intendance is where there are the more exclusive shops and boutiques.

== Culture ==
Bordeaux is the first city in France to have created, in the 1980s, an architecture exhibition and research centre, Arc en rêve.

The city has a large number of cinemas, theatres, and is the home of the Opéra national de Bordeaux. There are many music venues of varying capacity. The city also offers several festivals throughout the year.

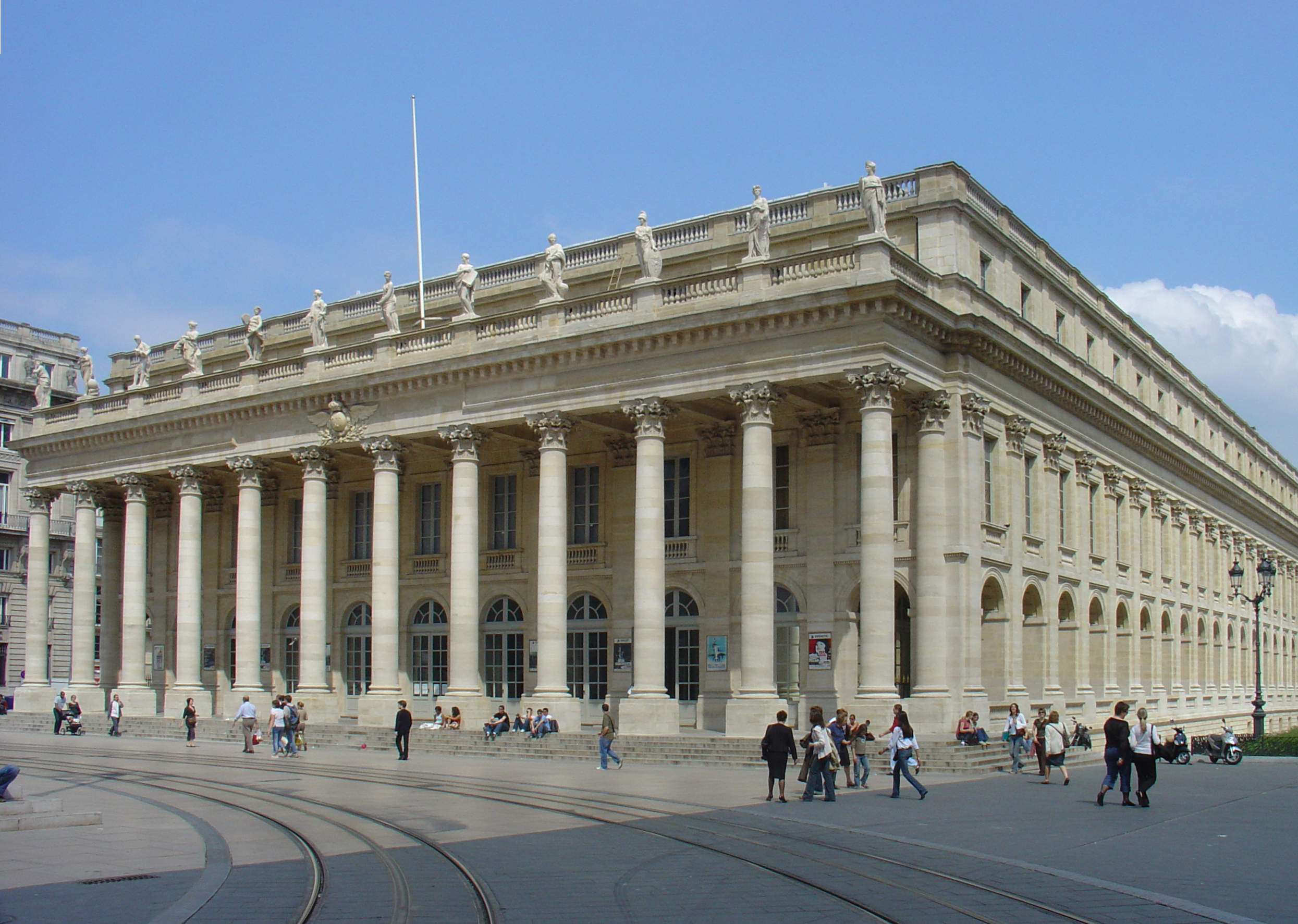
Grand Théâtre de Bordeaux

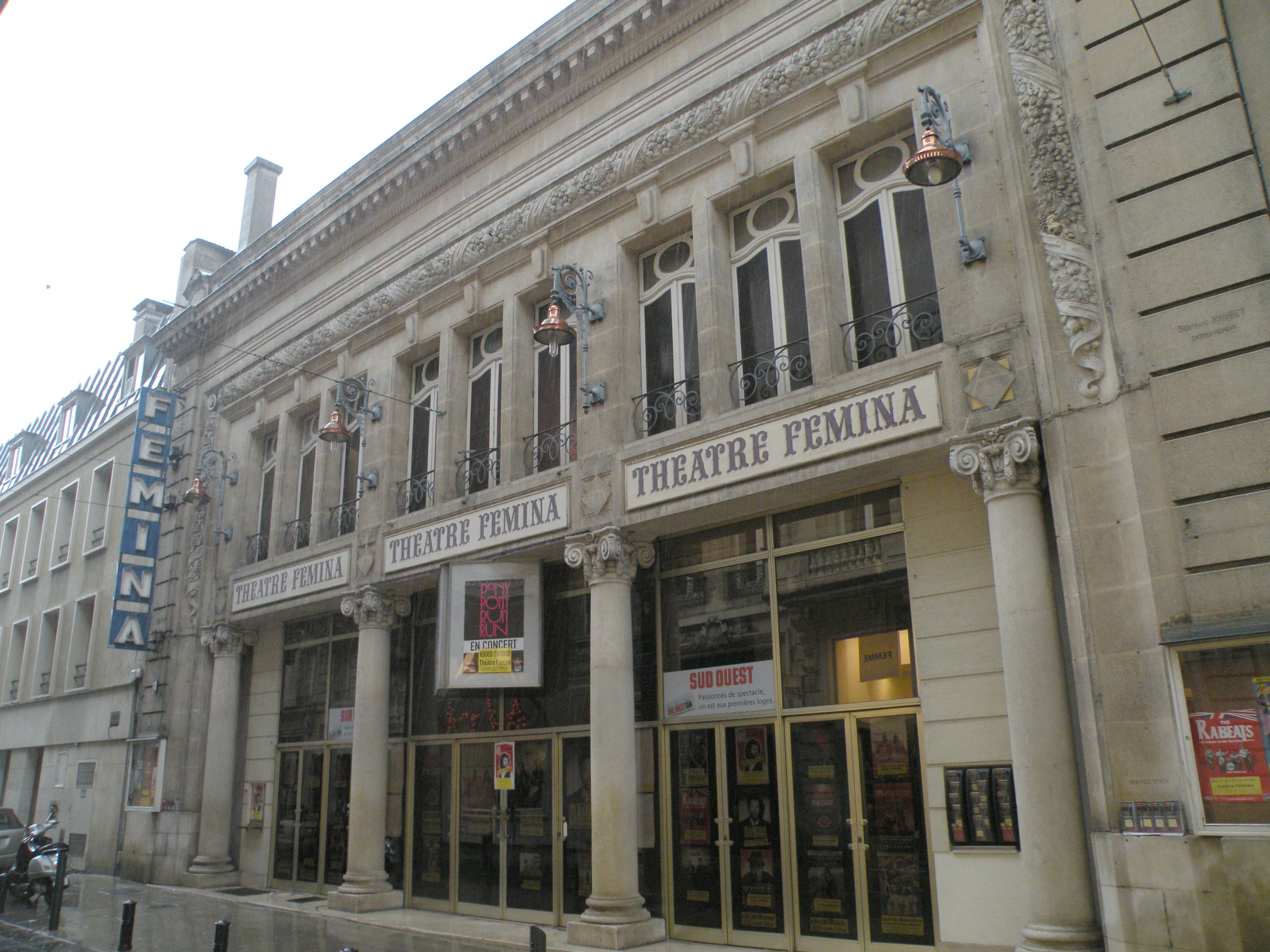
Théâtre Femina

=== Film festivals ===
- The Bordeaux International Festival of Women in Cinema (Festival international du cinéma au féminin de Bordeaux) took place in Bordeaux from 2002 until 2005.
- The Festival international du film indépendant de Bordeaux (FIFIB), or Bordeaux International Independent Film Festival, was established in 2012.
- The Festival européen du court métrage de Bordeaux (FEDCMB; European Short Film Festival of Bordeaux) has been held in Bordeaux since 1997. It is held in March each year.

=== Media ===
France 3 Aquitaine, part of France's national public television network, France Télévisions, has a television station in the city which broadcast local news, current affairs, sport and weather to across the Nouvelle-Aquitaine region. TV7 Bordeaux is a local television channel which broadcasting began in June, 2001 and broadcast local television programmmes to across the city and Gironde.

Local radio stations based in Bordeaux are ici Gironde, Wit FM, and BlackBox.

Local newspaper is served by the Sud Quest.

== Transport ==
=== Road ===
Bordeaux is an important road and motorway junction. The city is connected to Paris by the A10 motorway, with Lyon by the A89, with Toulouse by the A62, and with Spain by the A63. There is a 45 km (28 mi) ring road called the "Rocade" which is often very busy. Another ring road is under consideration.

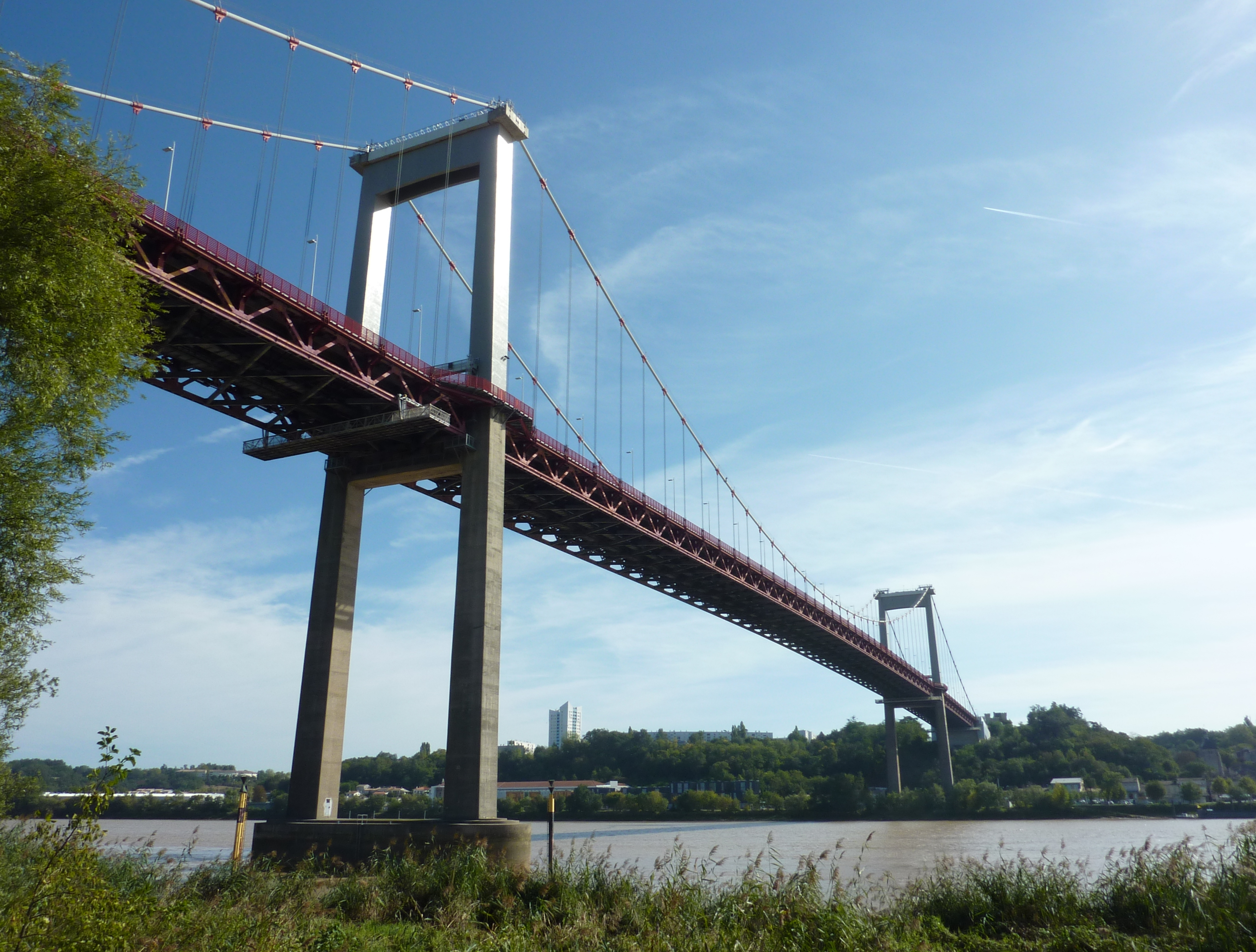
Pont d'Aquitaine

Bordeaux has five road bridges that cross the Garonne, the Pont de pierre built in the 1820s and three modern bridges built after 1960: the Pont Saint Jean, just south of the Pont de pierre (both located downtown), the Pont d'Aquitaine, a suspension bridge downstream from downtown, and the Pont François Mitterrand, located upstream of downtown. These two bridges are part of the ring-road around Bordeaux. A fifth bridge, the Pont Jacques-Chaban-Delmas, was constructed in 2009–2012 and opened to traffic in March 2013. Located halfway between the Pont de pierre and the Pont d'Aquitaine and serving downtown rather than highway traffic, it is a vertical-lift bridge with a height in closed position comparable to that of Pont de pierre, and to the Pont d'Aquitaine when open. All five road bridges, including the two highway bridges, are open to cyclists and pedestrians as well. Another bridge, the Pont Jean-Jacques Bosc, is to be built in 2018.

Lacking any steep hills, Bordeaux is relatively friendly to cyclists. Cycle paths (separate from the roadways) exist on the highway bridges, along the riverfront, on the university campuses, and incidentally elsewhere in the city. Cycle lanes and bus lanes that explicitly allow cyclists exist on many of the city's boulevards. A paid bicycle-sharing system with automated stations was established in 2010.

=== Rail ===
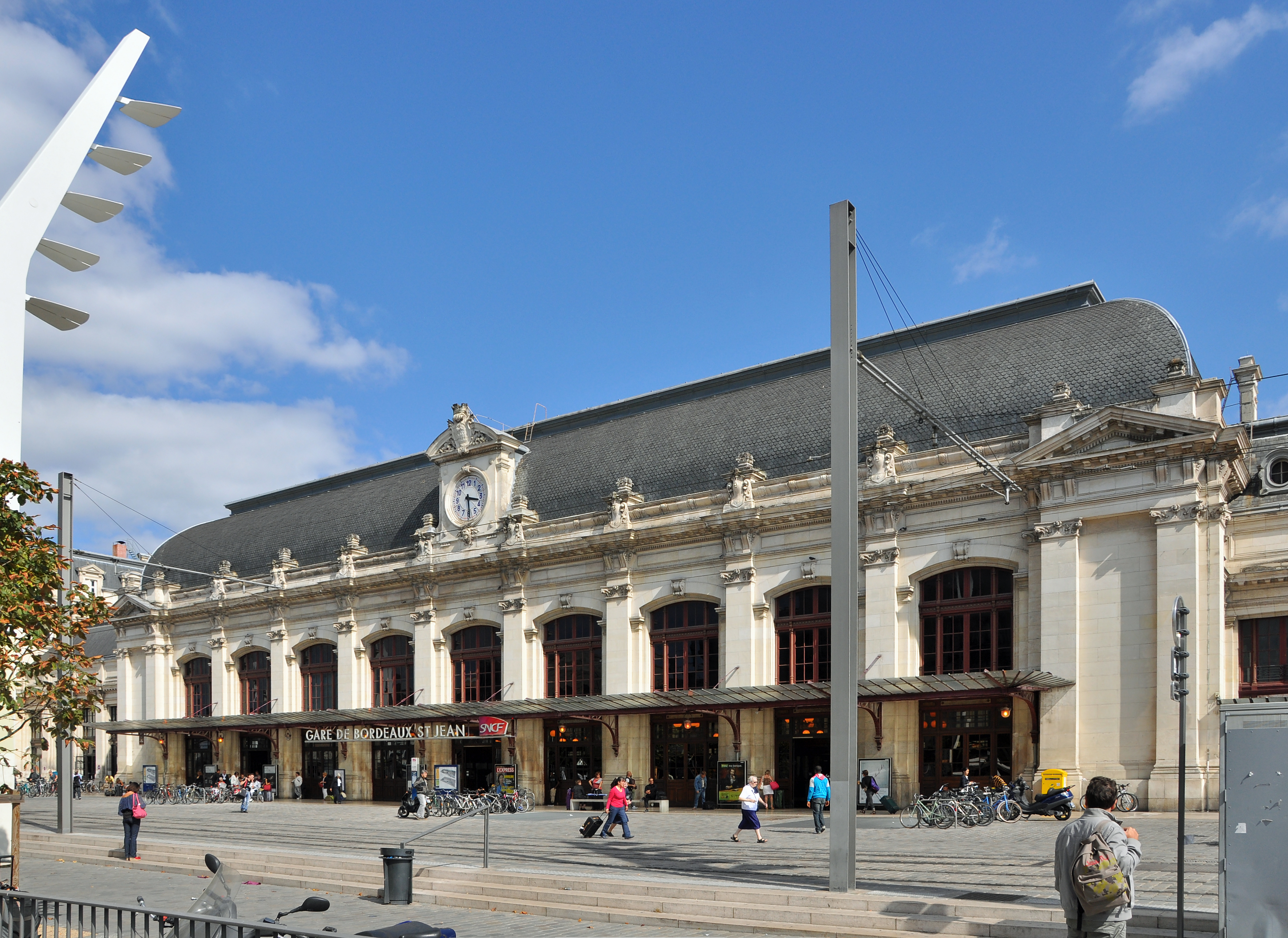
Gare de Bordeaux Saint-Jean

The main railway station, Gare de Bordeaux Saint-Jean, near the center of the city, has 12 million passengers a year. It is served by the French national (SNCF) railway's high speed train, the TGV, that gets to Paris in two hours, with connections to major European centers such as Lille, Brussels, Amsterdam, Cologne, Geneva and London. The TGV also serves Toulouse and Irun (Spain) from Bordeaux. A regular train service is provided to Nantes, Nice, Marseille and Lyon. The Gare Saint-Jean is the major hub for regional trains (TER) operated by the SNCF to Arcachon, Limoges, Agen, Périgueux, Langon, Pau, Le Médoc, Angoulême and Bayonne.

Historically the train line used to terminate at a station on the right bank of the river Garonne near the Pont de Pierre, and passengers crossed the bridge to get into the city. Subsequently, a double-track steel railway bridge was constructed in the 1850s, by Gustave Eiffel, to bring trains across the river direct into Gare de Bordeaux Saint-Jean. The old station was later converted and in 2010 comprised a cinema and restaurants.

The two-track Eiffel bridge with a speed limit of 30 km/h (19 mph) became a bottleneck and a new bridge was built, opening in 2009. The new bridge has four tracks and allows trains to pass at 60 km/h (37 mph). During the planning there was much lobbying by the Eiffel family and other supporters to preserve the old bridge as a footbridge across the Garonne, with possibly a museum to document the history of the bridge and Gustave Eiffel's contribution. The decision was taken to save the bridge, but by early 2010 no plans had been announced as to its future use. The bridge remains intact, but unused and without any means of access.

The LGV Sud Europe Atlantique became fully operational in July 2017, shortening the journey time from Bordeaux city to Paris to 2hrs 4mins.

=== Air ===
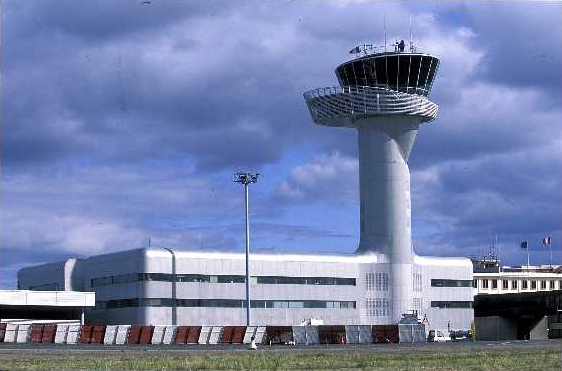
Bordeaux–Mérignac Airport

Bordeaux is served by Bordeaux–Mérignac Airport, located 8 km (5.0 mi) from the city centre in the suburban city of Mérignac.

=== Trams, buses and boats ===
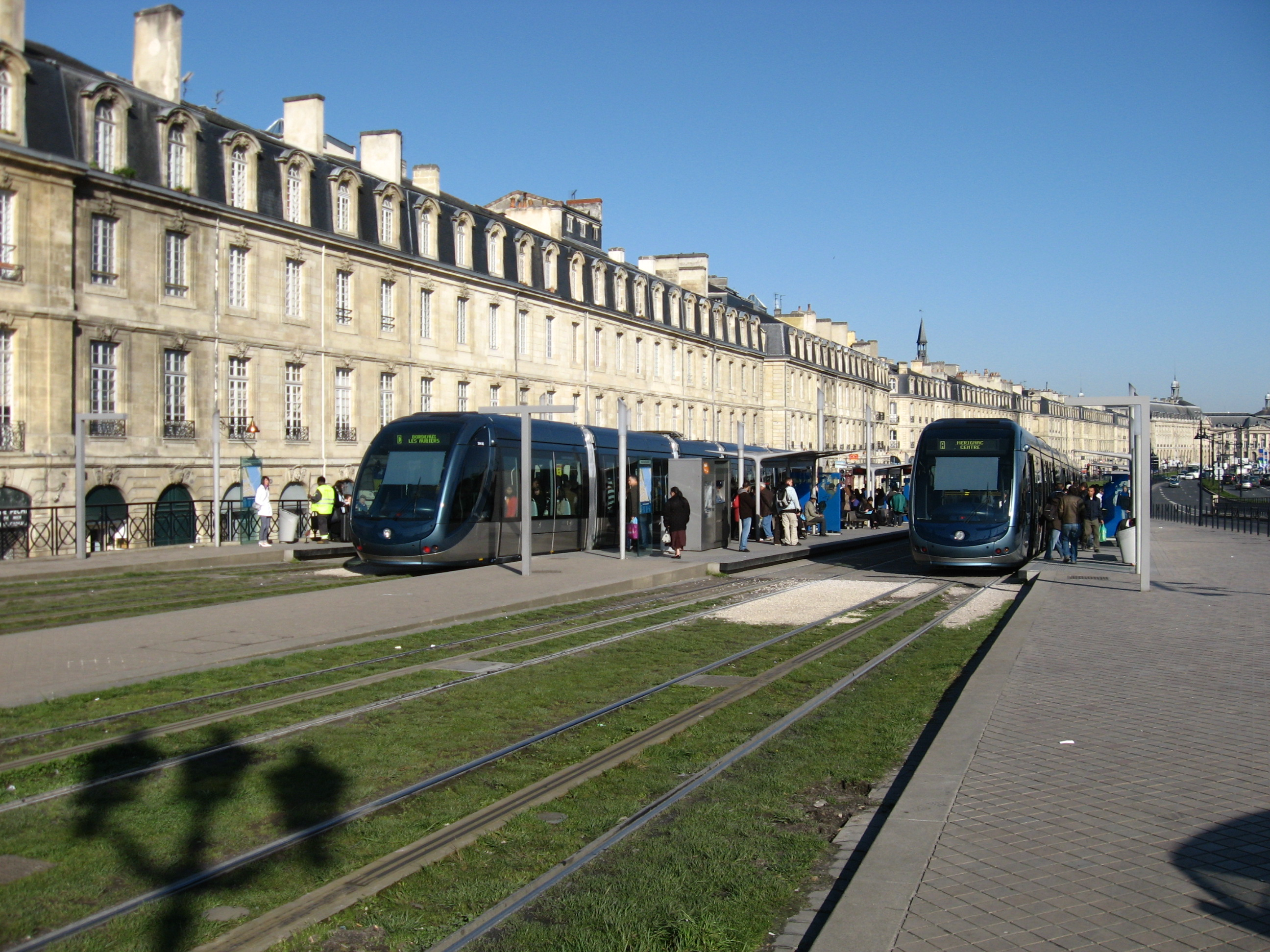
Tramway de Bordeaux

Bordeaux has an important public transport system called Transports Bordeaux Métropole (TBM). This company is run by the Keolis group. The network consists of:

- Six tram lines (A, B, C, D, E, and F)
- 75 bus routes, all connected to the tramway network (from 1 to 96)
- 13 night bus routes (from 1 to 16)
- An electric bus shuttle in the city centre
- A boat shuttle on the Garonne river

This network is operated from 5 am to 2 am.

There had been several plans for a subway network to be set up, but they stalled for both geological and financial reasons. Work on the Tramway de Bordeaux system was started in the autumn of 2000, and services started in December 2003 connecting Bordeaux with its suburban areas. The tram system uses Alstom APS a form of ground-level power supply technology developed by French company Alstom and designed to preserve the aesthetic environment by eliminating overhead cables in the historic city. Conventional overhead cables are used outside the city. The system was controversial for its considerable cost of installation, maintenance and also for the numerous initial technical problems that paralysed the network. Many streets and squares along the tramway route became pedestrian areas, with limited access for cars.

The Bordeaux Tramway system reached the Mérignac airport on April 29, 2023, with the opening of a 5-km extension of Line A.

=== Taxis ===
There are more than 400 taxicabs in Bordeaux.

=== Public transportation statistics ===
The average amount of time people spend commuting with public transit in Bordeaux, for example to and from work, on a weekday is 51 min. 12.% of public transit riders, ride for more than 2 hours every day. The average amount of time people wait at a stop or station for public transit is 13 min, while 15.5% of riders wait for over 20 minutes on average every day. The average distance people usually ride in a single trip with public transit is 7 km (4.3 mi), while 8% travel for over 12 km (7.5 mi) in a single direction.

== Sport ==
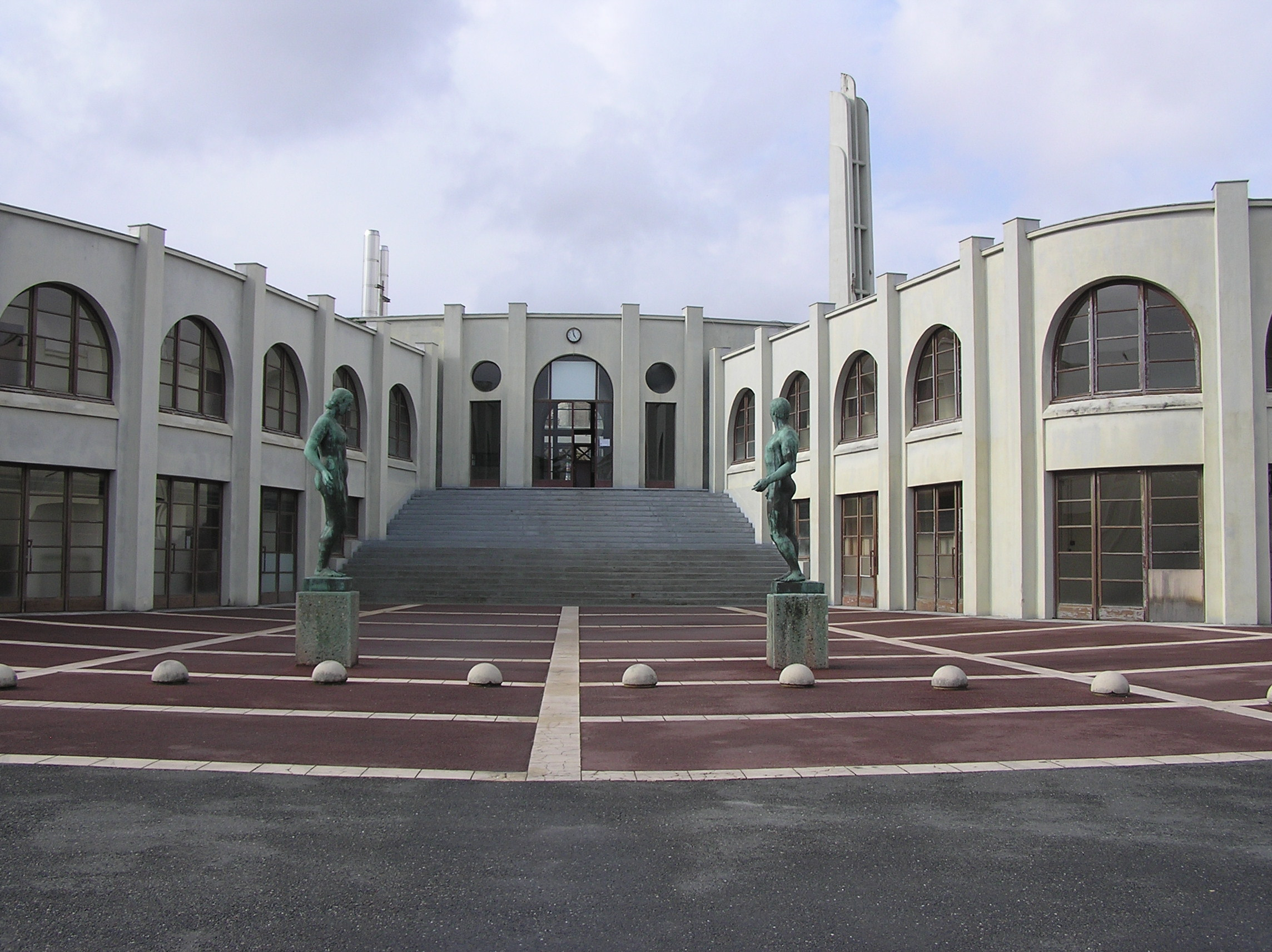
Entrance to the Stade Chaban-Delmas

Matmut Atlantique stadium

The 41,458-capacity Nouveau Stade de Bordeaux is the largest stadium in Bordeaux. The stadium was opened in 2015 and replaced the Stade Chaban-Delmas, which was a venue for the FIFA World Cup in 1938 and 1998, as well as the 2007 Rugby World Cup. In the 1938 FIFA World Cup, it hosted a violent quarter-final known as the Battle of Bordeaux. The ground was formerly known as the Stade du Parc Lescure until 2001, when it was renamed in honour of the city's long-time mayor, Jacques Chaban-Delmas.

There are two major sport teams in Bordeaux, Girondins de Bordeaux is the football team who, following administrative relegation, currently play in Championnat National 1, the fourth tier of French football. They are one of the most successful clubs in France, with six Division 1/Ligue 1 titles. Union Bordeaux Bègles is a rugby team in the Top 14 in the Ligue Nationale de Rugby. Skateboarding, rollerblading, and BMX biking are activities enjoyed by many young inhabitants of the city. Bordeaux is home to a quay which runs along the Garonne river. On the quay there is a skate-park divided into three sections. One section is for Vert tricks, one for street style tricks, and one for little action sports athletes with easier features and softer materials. The skate-park is very well maintained by the municipality.

Other sports clubs include top flight ice hockey team Boxers de Bordeaux and third-tier basketball team JSA Bordeaux Basket

Bordeaux is also the home to one of the strongest cricket teams in France and are champions of the South West League.

There is a 250 m (820 ft) wooden velodrome, Vélodrome du Lac, in Bordeaux which hosts international cycling competition in the form of UCI Track Cycling World Cup events.

The 2015 Trophee Eric Bompard was in Bordeaux. But the Free Skate was cancelled in all of the divisions due to the Paris bombing(s) and aftermath. The Short Program occurred hours before the bombing. French skaters Chafik Besseghier (68.36) in tenth place, Romain Ponsart (62.86) in 11th. Mae-Berenice-Meite (46.82) in 11th and Laurine Lecavelier (46.53) in 12th. Vanessa James/Morgan Cipres (65.75) in second.

Between 1951 and 1955, an annual Formula 1 motor race was held on a 2.5-kilometre circuit which looped around the Esplanade des Quinconces and along the waterfront, attracting drivers such as Juan Manuel Fangio, Stirling Moss, Jean Behra and Maurice Trintignant.

== Notable people ==
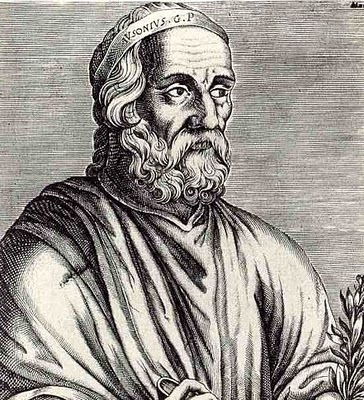
Ausonius

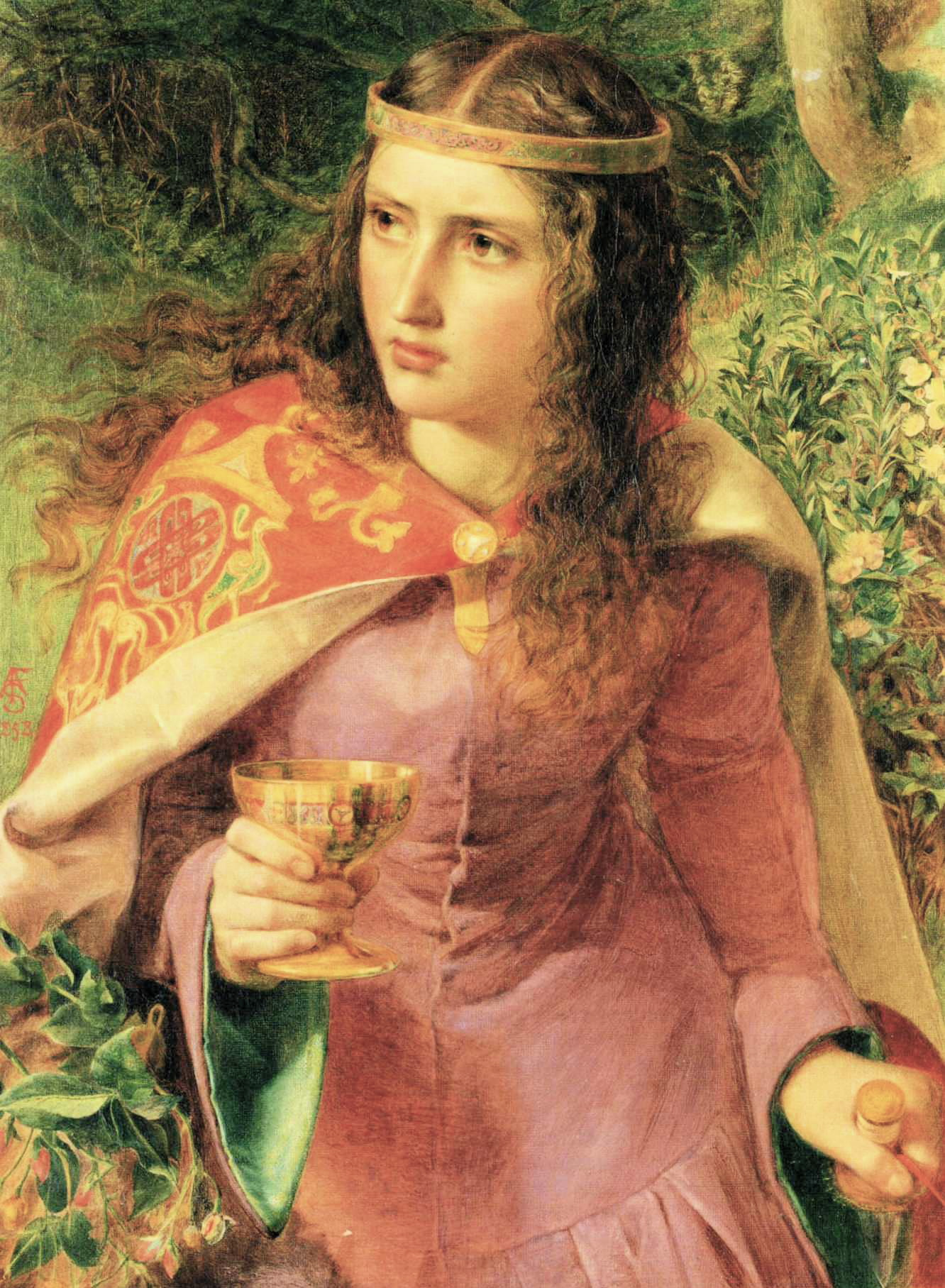
Eleanor of Aquitaine

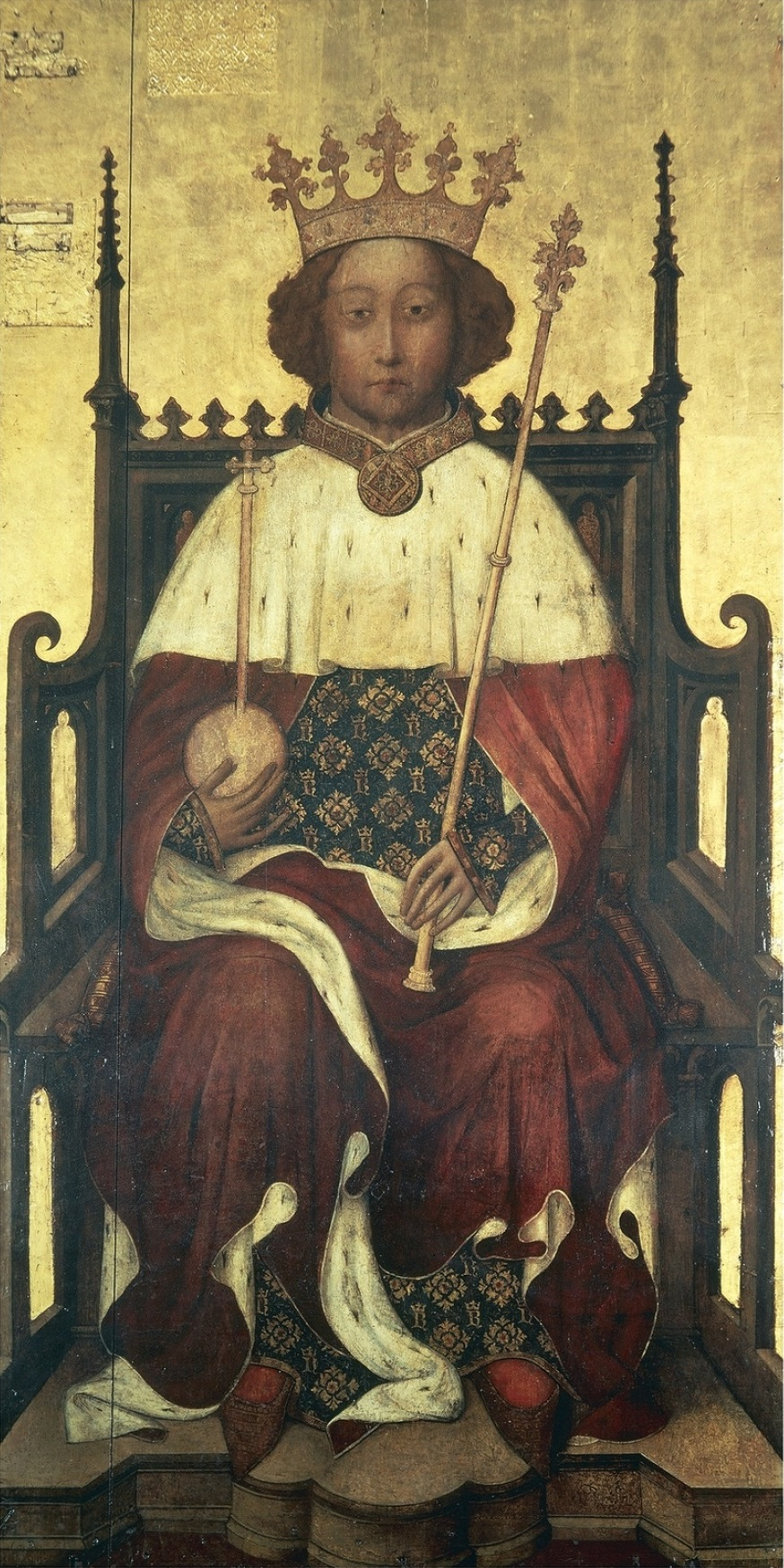
Richard II of England

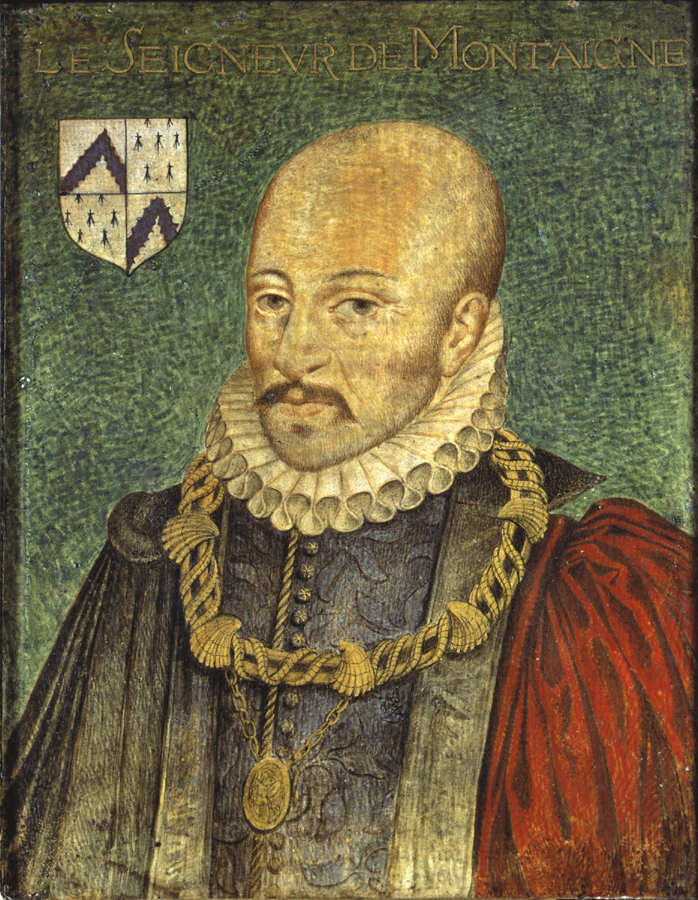
Michel de Montaigne

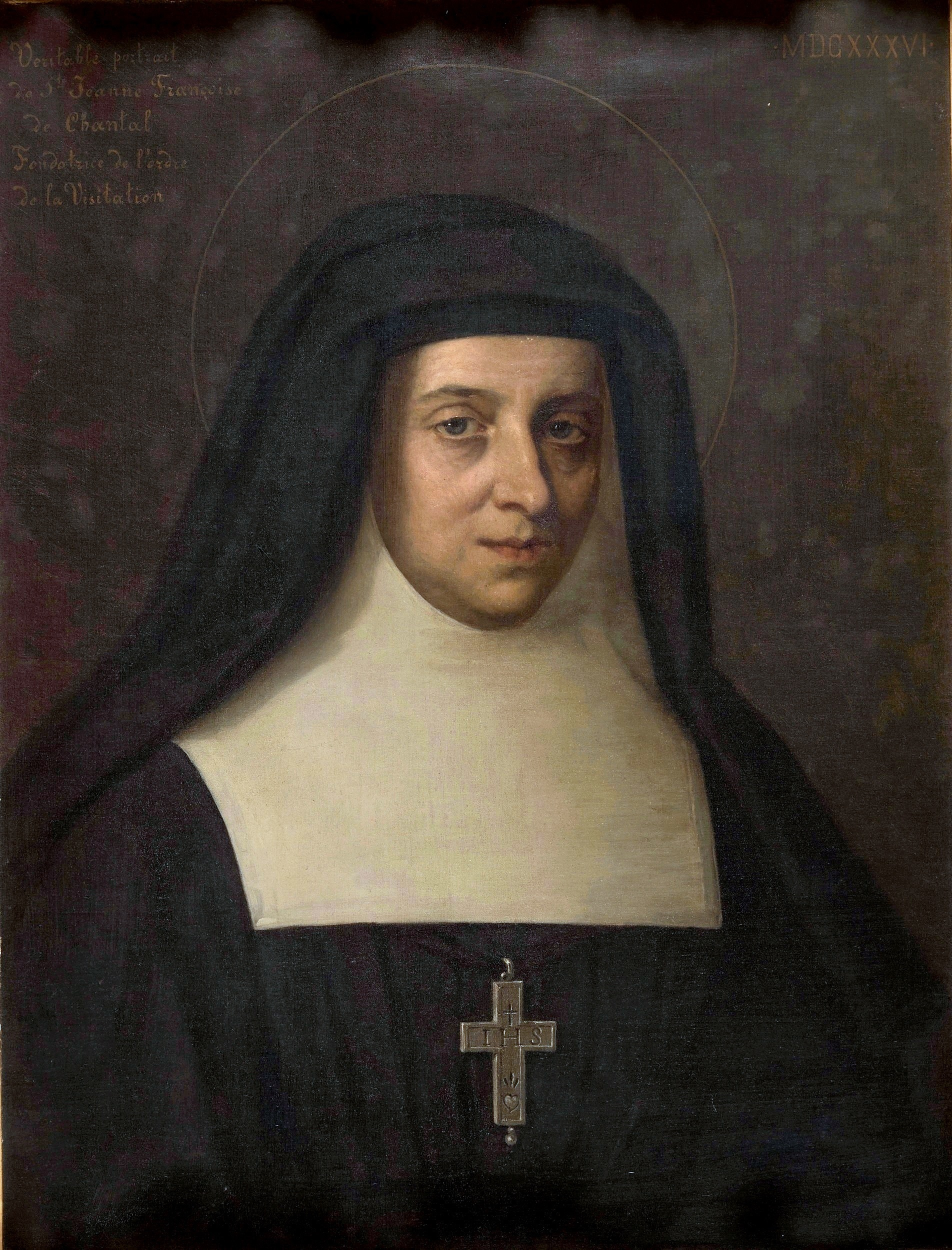
Sainte Jeanne de Lestonnac

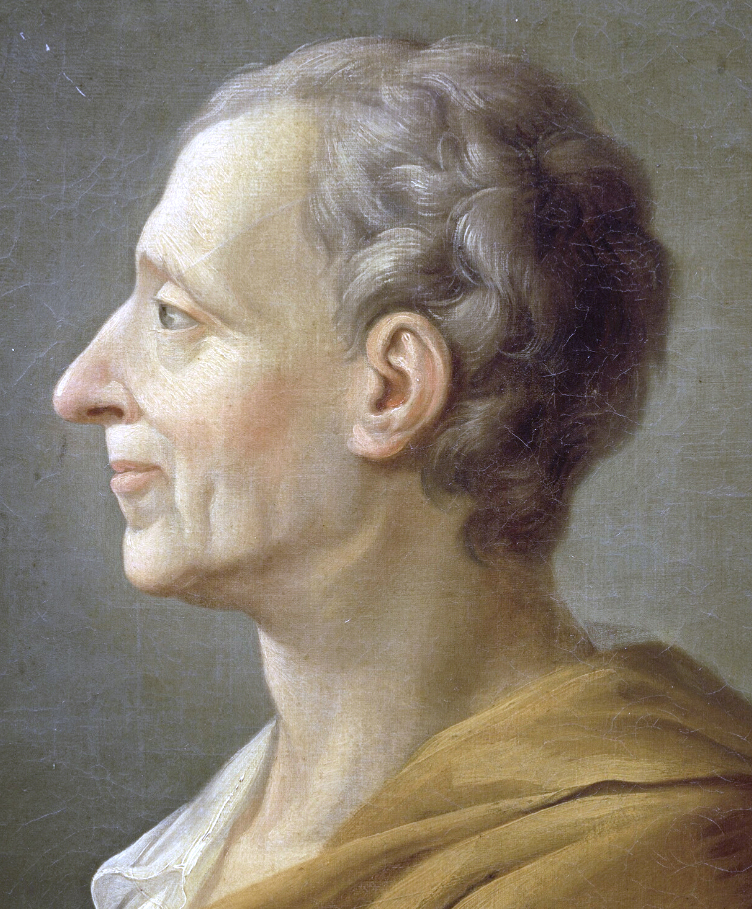
Montesquieu

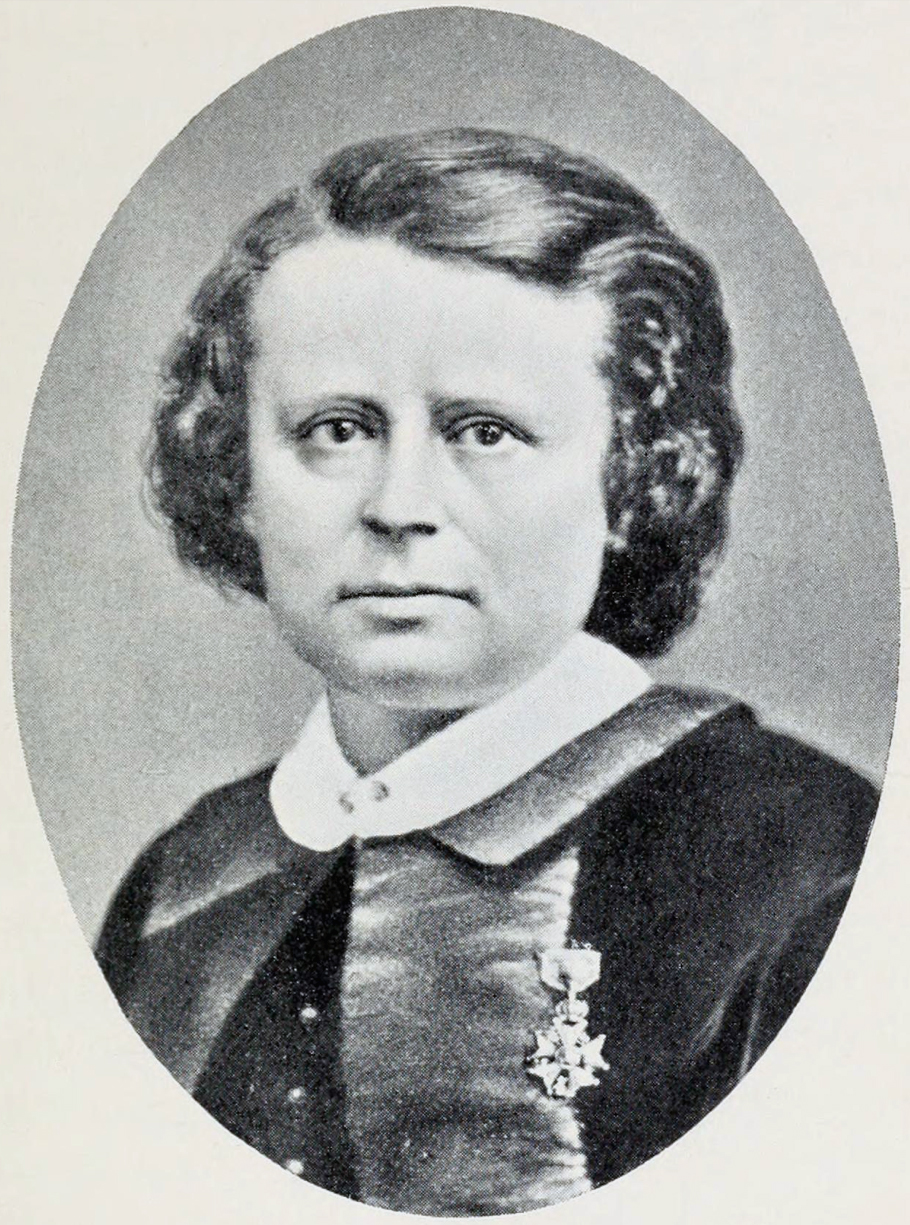
Rosa Bonheur

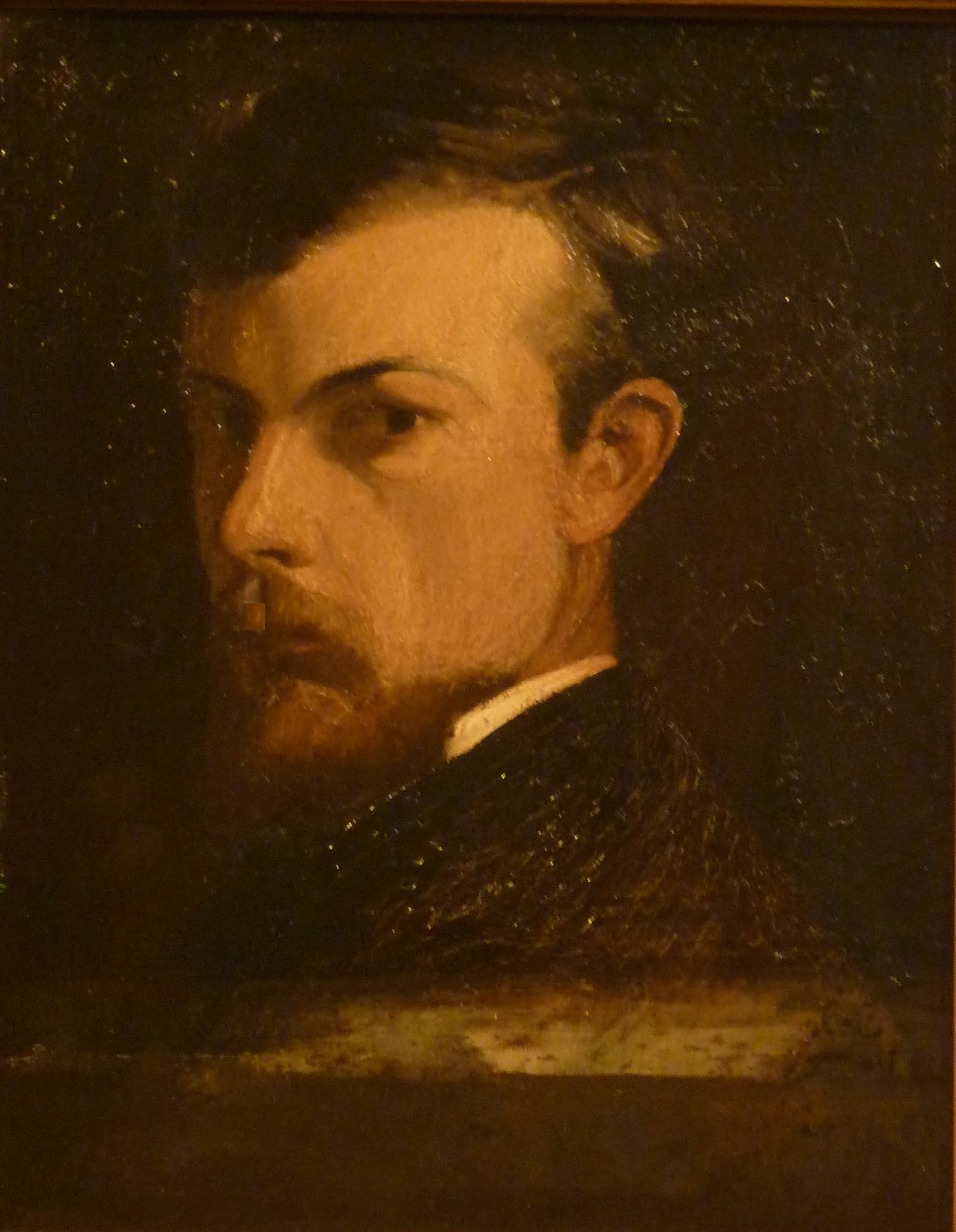
Odilon Redon

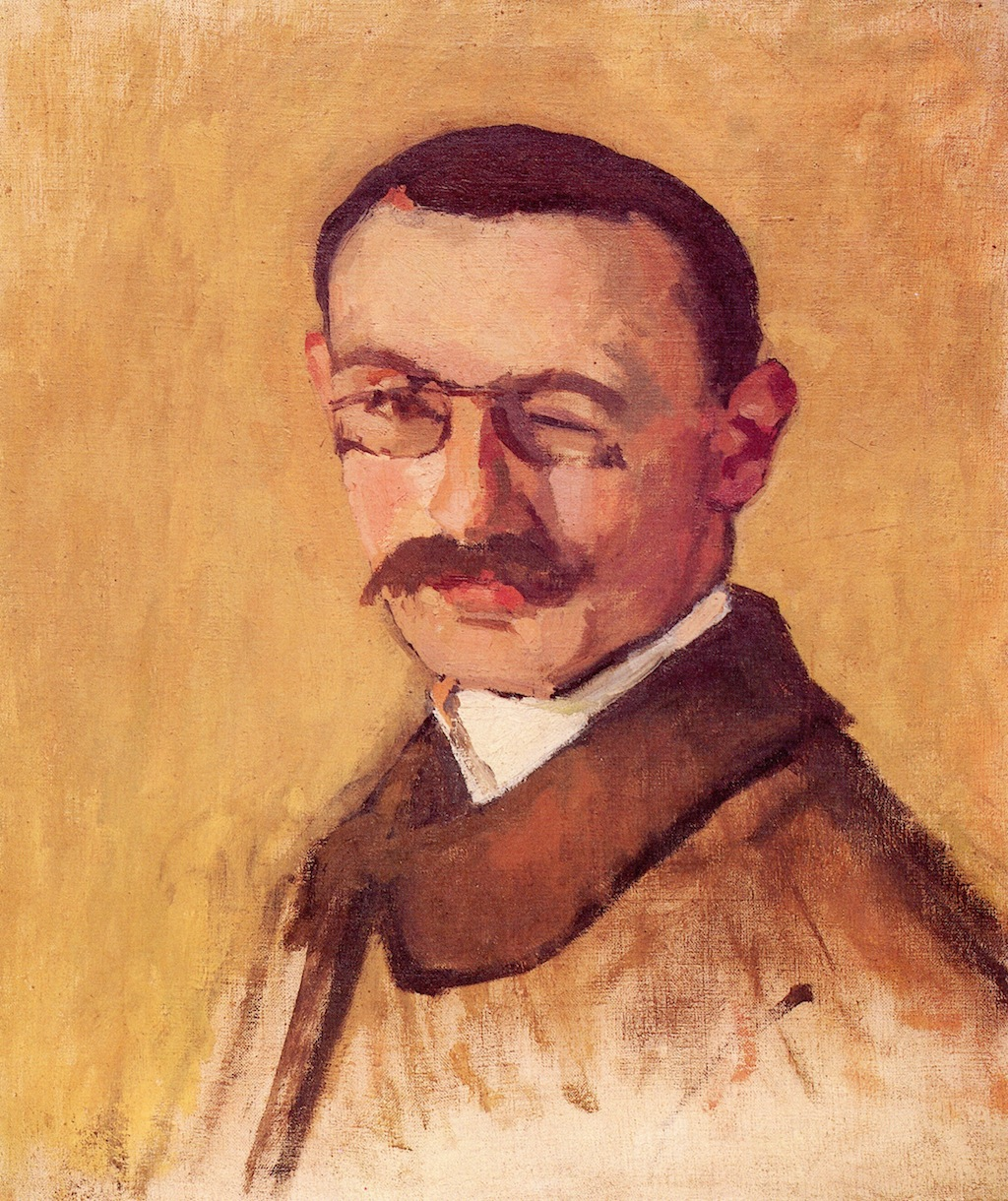
Albert Marquet
- Ausonius (310–395), Roman poet and teacher of rhetoric
- Jean Alaux (1786–1864), painter
- Bertrand Andrieu (1761–1822), engraver
- Jean Anouilh (1910–1987), dramatist
- Lucien Arman (1811–1873), shipbuilder and politician
- Yvonne Arnaud (1892–1958), pianist, singer and actress
- Xavier Arnozan (1852–1928), physician
- Jean Auriac (1906–1941), physician and member of the Resistance
- Floyd Ayité (born 1988), Togolese footballer
- Jonathan Ayité (born 1985), Togolese footballer
- Jean-Baptiste Barrière (1707–1747), cellist, composer
- Gérard Bayo (born 1936), writer and poet
- Jean Bertheroy (1858–1927), writer
- François Bigot (1703–1778), last "Intendant" of New France
- Arnaud Binard (born 1971), actor and producer
- Rosa Bonheur (1822–1899), animal painter and sculptor
- Grégory Bourdy (born 1982), golfer
- Samuel Boutal (born 1969), footballer
- Alice Caffarel (born 1961), linguist
- Edmond de Caillou (died c. February 1316), Gascon knight fighting in Scotland
- Gérald Caussé, Presiding Bishop of The Church of Jesus Christ of Latter Day Saints
- Leopold Chasseriau (1825–1891), planter
- René Clément (1913–1996), actor, director, writer
- Jean-René Cruchet (1875–1959), pathologist
- José Cubero Sánchez (1964–1985), Spanish bullfighter
- Boris Cyrulnik (born 1937), psychiatrist and psychoanalyst
- Damia (1899–1978), singer and actress
- Étienne Noël Damilaville (1723–1768), encyclopédiste
- Lili Damita (1901–1994), actress
- Frédéric Daquin, (born 1978), footballer
- Danielle Darrieux (1917–2017), actress
- Edmond Dédé (1827–1903), New Orleans native, composer, director of Theatre Alcazar
- Bernard Delvaille (1931–2006), poet, essayist
- Karfa Diallo (born 1971), writier and activist
- David Diop (1927–1960), poet
- Jean-François Domergue (born 1957), footballer
- Eleanor of Aquitaine (1122–1204), duchess of Aquitaine, queen of France and queen of England
- Jacques Ellul (1912–1994), sociologist, theologian, Christian anarchist
- Jean Eustache (1938–1981), Nouvelle Vague director
- Marie Fel (1713–1794), opera singer
- Jean-Luc Fournet (1965), papyrologist
- Pierre-Jean Garat (1762–1823), singer
- Armand Gensonné (1758–1793), politician
- Sébastien Gervais (born 1976), professional footballer
- Stephen Girard (1750–1831), merchant, banker, and Philadelphia philanthropist
- Jérôme Gnako (born 1968), footballer
- Randolph Gohi (born 1969), former professional footballer
- Eugène Goossens (1867–1958), conductor, violinist
- Anna Hamilton (1864–1935), doctor, superintendent of the Protestant Hospital at Bordeaux (1901–1934)
- Adolphe Jacquies (c. 1798–1860), Canadian shopkeeper, printer, trade unionist, and newspaper publisher
- Joseph Kabris (1780–1822), sailor known for his tattoos
- Pierre Lacour (1745–1814), painter
- Léopold Lafleurance (1865–1953), flautist
- Joseph Henri Joachim Lainé (1767–1835), statesman
- Sainte Jeanne de Lestonnac (1556–1640), Roman Catholic saint and foundress of the Sisters of the Company of Mary, Our Lady
- Christophe Lestrade (born 1969), former professional footballer
- André Lhote (1885–1962), cubist painter
- Jeanne Henriette Louis, (1938), professor of North American civilization
- Jean-Baptiste Lynch (1749–1835), politician
- Lucenzo (born 1983), singer
- Jean-Jacques Magendie (1766–1835), officer
- François Magendie (1783–1855), physiologist
- Bruno Marie-Rose (born 1965), athlete (sprinter)
- Albert Marquet, (1875–1947), painter
- François Mauriac (1885–1970), writer, Nobel laureate 1952
- Pierre Mauriac (1882-1963), physician
- Benjamin Millepied (born 1977), dancer and choreographer
- Édouard Molinaro (1928–2013), film director, screenwriter
- Pierre Molinier (1900–1976), painter, photographer
- Michel de Montaigne (1533–1592), essayist
- Montesquieu (1689–1755), man of letters and political philosopher
- Olivier Mony (1966–), writer and literary critic
- Étienne Marie Antoine Champion de Nansouty (1768–1815), general
- Elie Okobo, basketball player
- Pierre Palmade (born 1968), actor and comedian
- St. Paulinus of Nola (354–431), educator, religious figure
- Émile Péreire (1800–1875), banker and industrialist
- Sophie Pétronin (born 1945), aid worker and humanitarian
- Albert Pitres (1848–1928), neurologist
- Hippolyte Pradelles (1824–1913), naturalist painter
- Georges Antoine Pons Rayet (1839–1906), astronomer, discoverer of the Wolf-Rayet stars, & founder of the Bordeaux Observatory
- Emmanuel Régis (1855–1918), neuropsychiatrist
- Odilon Redon (1840–1916), painter
- Richard II of England (1367–1400), king
- Pierre Rode (1774–1830), violinist
- Olinde Rodrigues (1795–1851), mathematician, banker and social reformer
- Marie-Sabine Roger (born 1957), writer
- Eugenie Santa Coloma Sourget (1827–1895), composer, pianist and singer
- Bernard Sarrette (1765–1858), conductor and music pedagogue
- Jean-Jacques Sempé (1932–2022), cartoonist
- Jean-Joseph Sanfourche (1929–2010), painter
- Florent Serra (born 1981), tennis player
- Alfred Smith, (1854–1932), painter
- Soko (born 1985), singer
- Philippe Sollers, (born 1936), writer
- Wilfried Tekovi, (born 1989), Togolese footballer
- Elie Vinet (1509–1587), historian and humanist of the Renaissance
- Adam Siao Him Fa, (born 2001), professional figure skater
- Claude Dagens, (born 1940), prelate

== International relationships ==
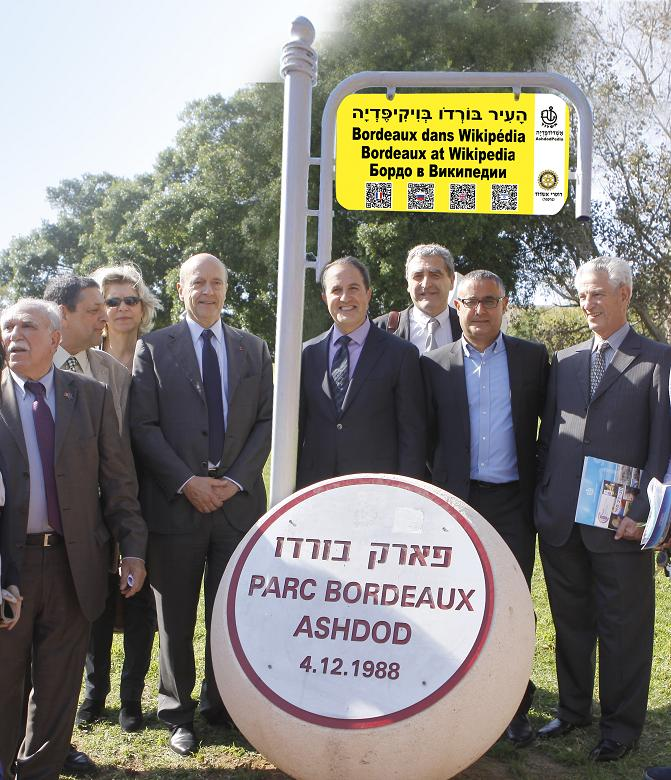
Alain Juppé, Mayor of Bordeaux, visiting the twin town of Ashdod

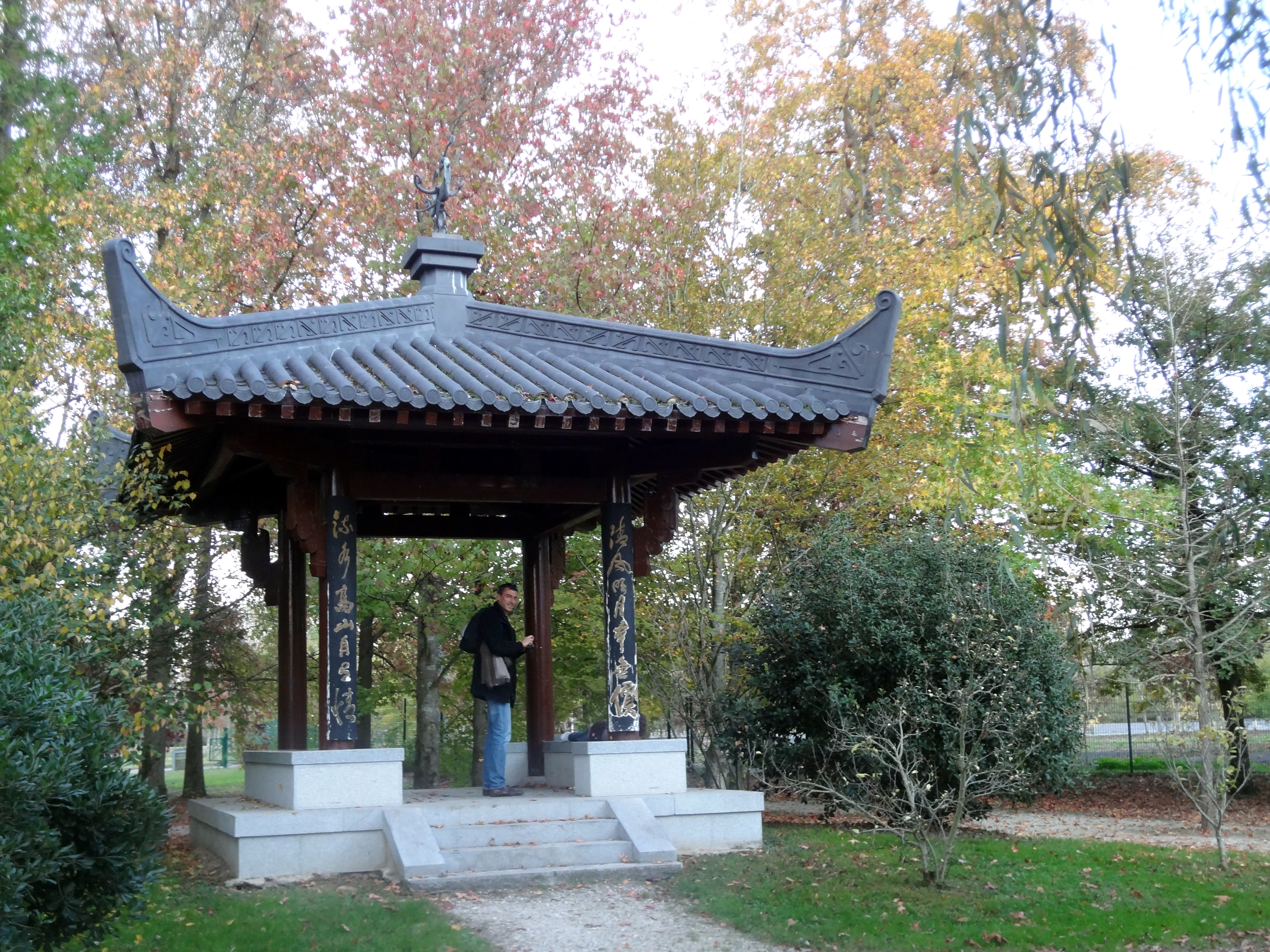
Wuhan pavilion at the Parc floral de Bordeaux

=== Twin towns – sister cities ===
Bordeaux is twinned with:

- Ashdod, Israel, since 1984
- Bilbao, Spain
- Baku, Azerbaijan, since 1985
- Bristol, United Kingdom, since 1947
- Casablanca, Morocco, since 1988
- Fukuoka, Japan, since 1982
- Kraków, Poland, since 1993
- Lima, Peru, since 1957
- Los Angeles, California United States, since 1968
- Madrid, Spain, since 1984
- Munich, Germany, since 1964
- Oran, Algeria, since 2003
- Porto, Portugal, since 1978
- Quebec City, Quebec Canada, since 1962
- Ramallah, Palestine
- Riga, Latvia
- Saint Petersburg, Russia, since 1993
- Wuhan, China, since 1998

=== Partnerships ===
- Samsun, Turkey, since 2010

== See also ==
- Atlantic history
- Bordeaux wine regions
- Bordeaux–Paris, a formerly professional road bicycle racing annual event
- The Burdigalian Age of the Miocene Epoch is named for Bordeaux
- Canelé, a local pastry
- Communes of the Gironde department
- Dogue de Bordeaux, a breed of dog originally bred for dog fighting
- French wine
- Girondins
- History of slavery
- List of mayors of Bordeaux
- Operation Frankton, a British Combined Operations raid on shipping in the harbour at Bordeaux, in December 1942, during World War II
- Roman Catholic Archdiocese of Bordeaux
