= Gascon campaign of 1450–1453 =

Campaign of Hundred Years War

Gascon campaign of 1450-1453
- Part of the Hundred Years' War
Date	1450 – 5 October 1453
Location	Duchy of Gascony
Result	French victory - Gascony annexed to France.

Belligerents
Kingdom of France; Duchy of Brittany	Kingdom of England; Duchy of Gascony

Commanders and leaders
Charles VII of France; Jean Bureau; Peter II, Duke of Brittany; Jacques de Chabannes; Jean de Dunois; Jean II de Bourbon; Olivier de Coëtivy; Gaston IV de Foix-Béarn	Gadifer Shorthose; Thomas Gassiot; John Talbot, Earl of Shrewsbury †; John Talbot, Viscount Lisle †; John de Foix, Earl of Kendal (POW); Pierre de Montferrand; Gaillard IV de Durfort

The Gascon campaign of 1450–1453 took place during the Hundred Years' War when the kingdom of France undertook a military campaign to invade and cede the Duchy of Gascony from the English. Following the decisive victory of the French at the battle of Castillion and after the fall of Bordeaux, the last English stronghold in Gascony, English control of Gascony was removed.

== Background ==
After the fall of Normandy, Charles VII concentrated his efforts on Gascony, the last remaining English province which had been English since 1154, some 300 years.

== First Campaign ==
On 1 November 1450, French forces defeated an English army at the Battle of Blanquefort. By 30 June 1451 Bordeaux had fallen to the French leaving only the Pale of Calais and the Channel Islands in British authority.

== Second Campaign ==
However, on 17 October 1452 John Talbot landed in Gascony. Six days later, the city usurped the garrison and Talbot entered the city. By December, most of Western Gascony was under English control, despite a small defeat at the Battle of Martignas on 25 June 1453, where 500 archers were ambushed by the Duke of Brabant and the Count of Foix. Charles had been expecting a campaign in Normandy, so he assembled his forces in winter and by early 1453, he was ready. Meanwhile, Talbot had received 3,000 troops from his fourth son John, Lord Lisle and 2,000 from Gascony, under the command of Jean de Foix, Earl of Kendal, assembling an army of around 8,000. French forces numbered 10,000. French forces laid siege to Castillon-la-Bataille and Talbot moved to meet them, with a force of just 500 men-at-arms and 800 archers, expecting the rest of his army, under the Earl of Kendal to reinforce him. After beating a French detachment of archers near the Castillon Church, Talbot advanced towards the French camp, believing they were retreating ( In fact, the camp followers were leaving for the upcoming battle). Jean Bureau, the French artillery commander had laid out a camp of three hundred cannons. Talbot, according to an earlier ransom agreement, was the only Englishman mounted and he did not wear armour. As his troops advanced, they were massacred by French cannon. Even though his reinforcements continued to arrive under Kendal, they too suffered the same fate. Despite the odds against the English, the battle lasted over an hour until the Duke of Brittany led cavalry against their rear and flank. Talbot was killed, possibly after his horse had been killed, a French archer finished him off with a battle axe. Talbot's son Lisle was also killed. Kendal was captured. This battle, the Battle of Castillon and the following Fall of Bordeaux mark the effective end of the war.
