= List of mayors of Bordeaux =

Mayor of Bordeaux
- Maire de Bordeaux

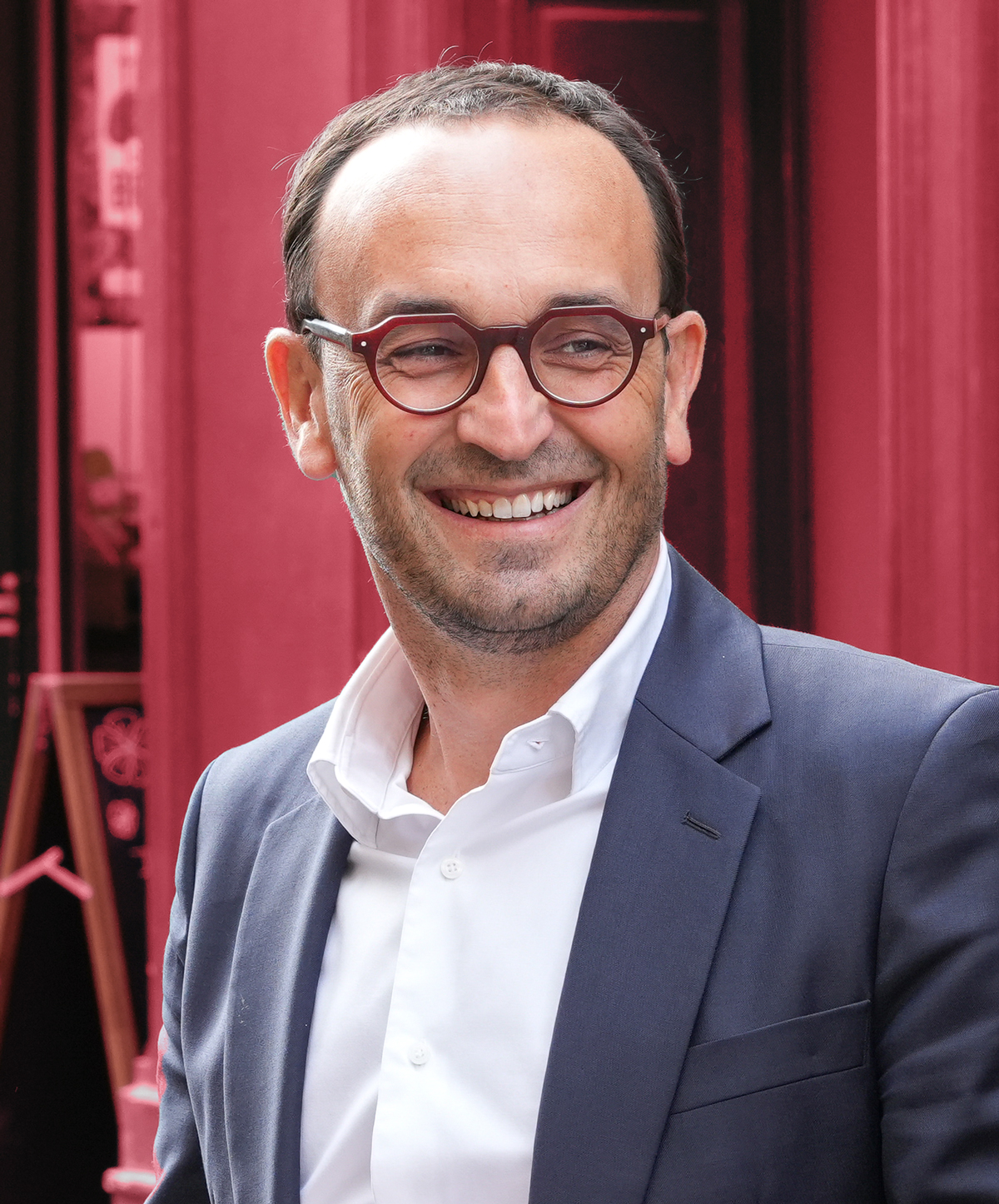
- Incumbent; Thomas Cazenave since 27 March 2026
- Residence: Palais Rohan
- Appointer: Popular election (with the approvation of the City Council)
- Term length: 6 years
- Inaugural holder: Pierre Lambert
- Formation: 1794 (official); 1208 (informal)
- Salary: 5,512 €
- Website: www.bordeaux.fr

Before the French Revolution, the municipality of Bordeaux was headed by the jurat (French: Jurat). The first mayor of Bordeaux (French: maire de Bordeaux) was elected in 1794.

== List ==
=== Chief-Jurats (1208–1244) ===
- Pierre Lambert (1208)
- Pierre Andron (1218)
- Bernard d'Acra (1219)
- Guillaume-Raimond Colom (1220)
- Pierre Béguey (1222)
- Amanieu Colom (1227)
- Alexandre de Cambes (1228)
- Guillaume Rostan (1229)
- Raimond Monadey (1230)
- Amanieu Lambert (1231)
- Vigouroux Béguey (1232)
- Gaucelm Colom (1233)
- Raimond Monadey (1234)
- Pierre Caillau, le Prud'homme (1235)
- Vigouroux Béguey (1236)
- Rostand del Soler le Prud'homme (mars 1238)
- Raimond Manadey (décembre 1238)
- Bernard d'Ailhan (1240)
- Martin Faure le Prud'homme (1241)
- Rostand del Soler, le Prud'homme (1241)
- Pierre Béguey, fils de Pierre (1242)
- Guillaume Gondaumer (1243–1244)

=== Perpetual Mayors (1244–1790) ===
#	Mayor	Term start	Term end	Appointer
1	Pierre Caillau	1244	1245	Louis IX
2	Guillaume-Raimon Colom	1245	1246	Louis IX
3	Jean Colom	1246	1247	Louis IX
4	Guillaume Gondaumer	1247	1248	Louis IX
5	Pierre Bonafous	1248	1248	Louis IX
6	Guillaume Arnaud Monadey	1248	1249	Louis IX
7	Martin Faure	1249	1250	Louis IX
(2)	Guillaume-Raimon Colom	1249	1250	Louis IX
8	Seguin Barba	1250	1251	Louis IX
9	Amanieu Colom	1251	1252	Louis IX
10	Pierre Doat	1252	1253	Louis IX
(2)	Guillaume-Raimon Colom	1253	1254	Louis IX
11	Raimon Brun de Laporte	1254	1255	Louis IX
12	Pierre Gondaumer	1256	1257	Louis IX
13	Arnaud-Guillaume Aymeric	1257	1258	Louis IX
(2)	Guillaume-Raimon Colom	1258	1259	Louis IX
14	Jean Colom	1259	1259	Louis IX
15	Arnaud Caillau	1259	1260	Louis IX
16	Pierre Gondaumer	1260	1261	Louis IX
17	Guitar de Laporte	1261	December 1261	Louis IX
18	Raimond Monadey	December 1261	1262	Louis IX
19	Hugues de Broys	1262	1263	Louis IX
20	Jean de Lalinde	1263	1263	Louis IX
21	Henri de Cusances	1263	1264	Louis IX
22	Raimond Marquès	1264	1265	Louis IX
23	Hugues Rostan	1265	1266	Louis IX
24	Fortaner de Cazenove	1266	1267	Louis IX
25	Pons d'Antin	1268	1270	Louis IX
26	Fortaner de Cazenove	1270	1271	Philip III
27	Hugues de Gamans	1271	1272	Philip III
28	Pierre Gondaumer	1272	1274	Philip III
29	Bernard Gaitapui	1274	1275	Philip III
30	Henri le Gallois	1275	1275	Philip III
31	Brun de Saye	1275	1277	Philip III
32	Guitard de Bourg	1277	1278	Philip III
33	Bernard d'Ailhan	1278	1279	Philip III
34	Pierre Estèbe	1279	1280	Philip III
35	Rostan del Soler	1280	1281	Philip III
36	Simon Gondemer	1281	1282	Philip III
37	Pierre del Soler	1282	1283	Philip III
38	Jean Colom	1283	1284	Philip III
39	Arnaud Modaney	1284	1285	Philip III
40	Pierre Colom	1285	1286	Philip IV
41	Bernard Ferradre	1287	1288	Philip IV
42	Thomas de Sandwich	1288	1289	Philip IV
43	Vital Pansa (gov.)	1289	September 1290	Philip IV
44	Arnaud de la Naude	September 1290	1291	Philip IV
45	Pierre Daussure	1291	1292	Philip IV
46	Pierre Dumas	1292	1293	Philip IV
47	Guiraud de Lacour	1293	1293	Philip IV
48	Alexandre de la Pébrée	1293	1294	Philip IV
49	Girmond de Burlats	1294	1294	Philip IV
50	Arnaud Olivei	1284	March 1295	Philip IV
51	Gilbert Auboyn	March 1295	1295	Philip IV
52	Guillaume de Rabastens	1295	1296	Philip IV
53	Bertrand du Faugas	1296	1300	Philip IV
Office suppressed by Philip IV
54	Edmont Thorpe	July 1402	Late 1402	Charles VI (France)
55	Hugues Lutherell	Late 1402	1404	Charles VI (France)
56	Guillaume-Amanieu de Madaillan	1404	1405	Charles VI (France)
57	Thomas Swynburne	1405	1412	Henry IV (England)
58	Peter Buckton	1412	1413	Henry IV (England)
59	John St. John	1413	1422	Henry V (England)
60	John Radcliffe	June 1423	1425	Henry VI (England)
(59)	John St. John	1425	1427	Henry VI (England)
61	Laurence Merbury	1427	1428	Henry VI (England)
62	The Earl of Huntingdon	1428	1430	Henry VI (England)
63	John Bayle	1432	1434	Henry VI (England)
64	Gadifer Shorthose	1434	1451	Henry VI (England)
65	Jean Bureau	August 1451	1452	Charles VII (France)
66	Henry Redford	1452	1453	Henry VI (England)
(65)	Jean Bureau	1453	1460	Charles VII (France)
67	Jean de Lalande	1460	1463	Louis XI
68	Charles des Astars	1463	1470	Louis XI
69	Charles des Astars	1463	1470	Louis XI
70	Jean Albun	1470	1472	Louis XI
71	Jean de Mommerin	1472	1480	Louis XI
72	Jean de Durfort	1480	1485	Louis XI
73	Poncet de la Rivière	1485	1495	Charles VIII
(72)	Jean de Durfort	1495	1515	Louis XII
74	Bertrand de Madaillan d'Estissac	1520	1522	Francis I
75	Philippe de Chabot	1525	1531	Francis I
76	Charles de Chabot	1531	1545	Francis I
77	Guy de Chabot	1545	1548	Francis I
78	François de Lamothe	1550	1552	Henry II
79	Gaston de l'Isle	1552	1554	Henry II
80	Pierre Eyquem de Montaigne	1554	1556	Henry II
81	Louis de Saint-Gelais	1556	1558	Henry II
(78)	François de Lamothe †	1558	1559	Henry II
82	Pierre Geneste	1559	1561	Francis II
83	Antoine de Noailles	1561	1563	Charles IX
(79)	Gaston de l'Isle	1563	1564	Charles IX
84	Gaston de la Touche	1564	1567	Charles IX
85	Guy de Saint-Gelais	1567	1571	Charles IX
86	Henri de Foix	1571	1573	Charles IX
87	Charles Gaston de Montferrand	1573	1575	Charles IX
88	Joseph d'Eymard	1575	1577	Henry III
89	Armand de Gontaut	1577	September 1581	Henry III
90	Michel de Montaigne	12 September 1581	1585	Henry III
91	Jacques II de Goyon	1585	1589	Henry III
91	Jacques II de Goyon	1589	1599	Henry IV
92	Alphonse d'Ornano	1599	1610	Henry IV
93	Antoine de Roquelaure	1610	1611	Louis XIII
94	Aymeric Jaubert	1611	1613	Louis XIII
(93)	Antoine de Roquelaure	1613	1617	Louis XIII
95	Henri des Prés	1617	1620	Louis XIII
Office suppressed by Louis XIII
96	Godefroi d'Estrades	1653	1675	Louis XIV
97	Louis d'Estrades	1675	1711	Louis XIV
98	Louis Godefroy d'Estrades	1711	1715	Louis XIV
98	Louis Godefroy d'Estrades	1715	1769	Louis XV
99	Viscount of Noë	1769	1774	Louis XV
99	Viscount of Noë	1774	1790	Louis XVI

== Mayors (1790–1796) ==
	Mayor	Term start	Term end	Political Party
1	Joseph, Count Fumel	3 April 1790	June 1791	Monarchien
2	François-Armand de Saige †	June 1791	25 October 1793	Girondin
3	Joseph-François Bertrand †	26 October 1793	28 July 1794	Jacobin
4	Pierre Thomas	14 August 1794	16 November 1794	Jacobin
5	Jean Ferrière	16 November 1794	5 April 1797	Nonpartisan

== Amalgamation (1797–1801) ==
In 1797, the office of Mayor was divided in three arrondissement-mayors: the North (1st Arrondissement), the South (2nd Arrondissement) and the center (3rd Arrondissement).

1st Arrondissement			2nd Arrondissement			3rd Arrondissement		
Jean-Baptiste Mareilhac	5 April 1797	5 April 1798	Jean-Baptiste Lartigue	5 April 1797	5 April 1798	Pierre Lucadou	5 April 1797	5 April 1799
Jean-Baptiste Lartigue	5 April 1798	5 April 1799	Becheau	5 April 1798	5 April 1800	Giraud	5 April 1799	5 April 1800
Rochefort	5 April 1799	5 April 1800	Becheau	5 April 1798	5 April 1800	Giraud	5 April 1799	5 April 1800
Charles-Jacques Fieffé	5 April 1800	5 April 1801	Jean-Baptiste Mathieu	5 April 1800	5 April 1801	Pierre-Barthélémy Portal d'Albarèdes	5 April 1800	5 April 1801

The arrondissements' mayors were abolished in 1801, but the Mayor's office was re-introduced only in 1805, during the First Empire.

=== Mayors (1805–present) ===
	Mayor	Term start	Term end	Political Party
6	Laurent Lafaurie de Monbadon	14 September 1805	6 March 1809	Bonapartist
7	Jean-Baptiste Lynch	7 March 1809	20 March 1815	Bonapartist
	Jean-Baptiste Lynch	7 March 1809	20 March 1815	Royalist
8	Jacques Barthélémy Gramont de Castéra	21 March 1815	1816	Nonpartisan
9	Joseph-Marie de Gourgue	1816	1825	Ultra-royalist
10	Victor, Viscount of Hamel	1825	30 July 1830	Ultra-royalist
11	Charles, Marquis of Bryas	10 August 1830	10 April 1831	Movement Party
12	Joseph-Thomas Brun †	10 April 1831	1838	Resistance Party
13	David Johnston	1838	14 April 1842	Resistance Party
14	Lodi-Martin Duffour-Dubergier	15 April 1842	10 March 1848	Resistance Party
15	Jean-Baptiste Basile Billaudel	10 March 1848	15 August 1848	Republican
16	Gustave Curé	15 August 1848	19 March 1849	Conservative
17	Antoine Gautier	20 March 1849	1860	Bonapartist
18	Pierre Castéja †	1860	1863	Bonapartist
19	Guillaume-Henri Brochon	31 December 1863	1867	Bonapartist
20	Alexandre de Bethmann	1867	4 September 1870	Bonapartist
21	Émile Fourcand	6 November 1870	April 1874	Moderate
22	Charles de Pelleport-Burète	April 1874	12 August 1876	Moralist
(21)	Émile Fourcand	13 August 1876	21 January 1878	Moderate
23	Albert Brandenburg	22 January 1878	25 January 1884	Radical
24	Alfred Daney	26 January 1884	6 May 1888	Opportunist Republican
25	Adrien Bayssellance	7 May 1888	8 May 1892	Moderate
(24)	Alfred Daney	9 May 1892	16 May 1896	Moderate
26	Camille Cousteau	17 May 1896	29 January 1900	Independent Socialist
27	Paul-Louis Lande	20 May 1900	14 May 1904	Democratic Alliance
(24)	Alfred Daney	15 May 1904	10 May 1908	Democratic Alliance
28	Jean Bouche	15 May 1908	19 May 1912	Democratic Alliance
29	Charles Gruet	20 May 1912	1 November 1919	Democratic Alliance
30	Fernand Philippart	23 November 1919	10 May 1925	Democratic Alliance
31	Adrien Marquet	23 November 1919	10 July 1940	Socialist
Vichy France (1940–1944)
(31)	Adrien Marquet	10 July 1940	29 August 1944	National Popular Rally
Liberation of France (1944)
32	Jean-Fernand Audeguil	30 August 1944	18 October 1947	Socialist
33	Jacques Chaban-Delmas	19 October 1947	19 June 1995	Rally of the French People; Union for the New Republic; Union of Democrats for the Republic; Rally for the Republic
34	Alain Juppé	19 June 1995	13 December 2004	Rally for the Republic; Union for a Popular Movement
35	Hugues Martin	13 December 2004	8 October 2006	Union for a Popular Movement
(34)	Alain Juppé	8 October 2006	7 March 2019	Union for a Popular Movement; The Republicans
36	Nicolas Florian	7 March 2019	3 July 2020	The Republicans
37	Pierre Hurmic	3 July 2020	27 March 2026	Europe Ecology - The Greens
38	Thomas Cazenave	27 March 2026	Incumbent	Renaissance
