= Siege of Bordeaux =

Siege of Bordeaux may refer to:

- Siege of Bordeaux (1294), an unsuccessful ten day siege of the town by the English during the Gascon War
- Siege of Bordeaux (1296), another unsuccessful siege of the town by the English during the Gascon War
- Siege of Bordeaux (1359), an unsuccessful siege of the town by the French during the Hundred Years' War
- Siege of Bordeaux (1405), another siege of the town during the Hundred Years' War
- Siege of Bordeaux (1451–1452), the siege and capture of the town by the French during the Hundred Years' War
- Siege of Bordeaux (1453), the final siege and capture by the French of the town during the Hundred Years' War
