= Siege of Bayonne =

Siege of Bayonne may refer to:

- Siege of Bayonne (1130–31), the unsuccessful siege of the town and castle by Alfonso the Battler, King of Aragon and Navarre
- Siege of Bayonne (1374), the siege of the town and castle by Henry II of Castile, during the Hundred Years' War
- Siege of Bayonne (1451), the siege and capture of the town and castle by the French during the French annexation of Gascony
- Siege of Bayonne (1523), the siege of the town and castle during the Italian War of 1521–1526
- Siege of Bayonne (1814), the siege of the town and castle by Allied forces under Lieutenant General John Hope, during the Peninsular War
