= Thomas Cazenave =

French politician (born 1978)

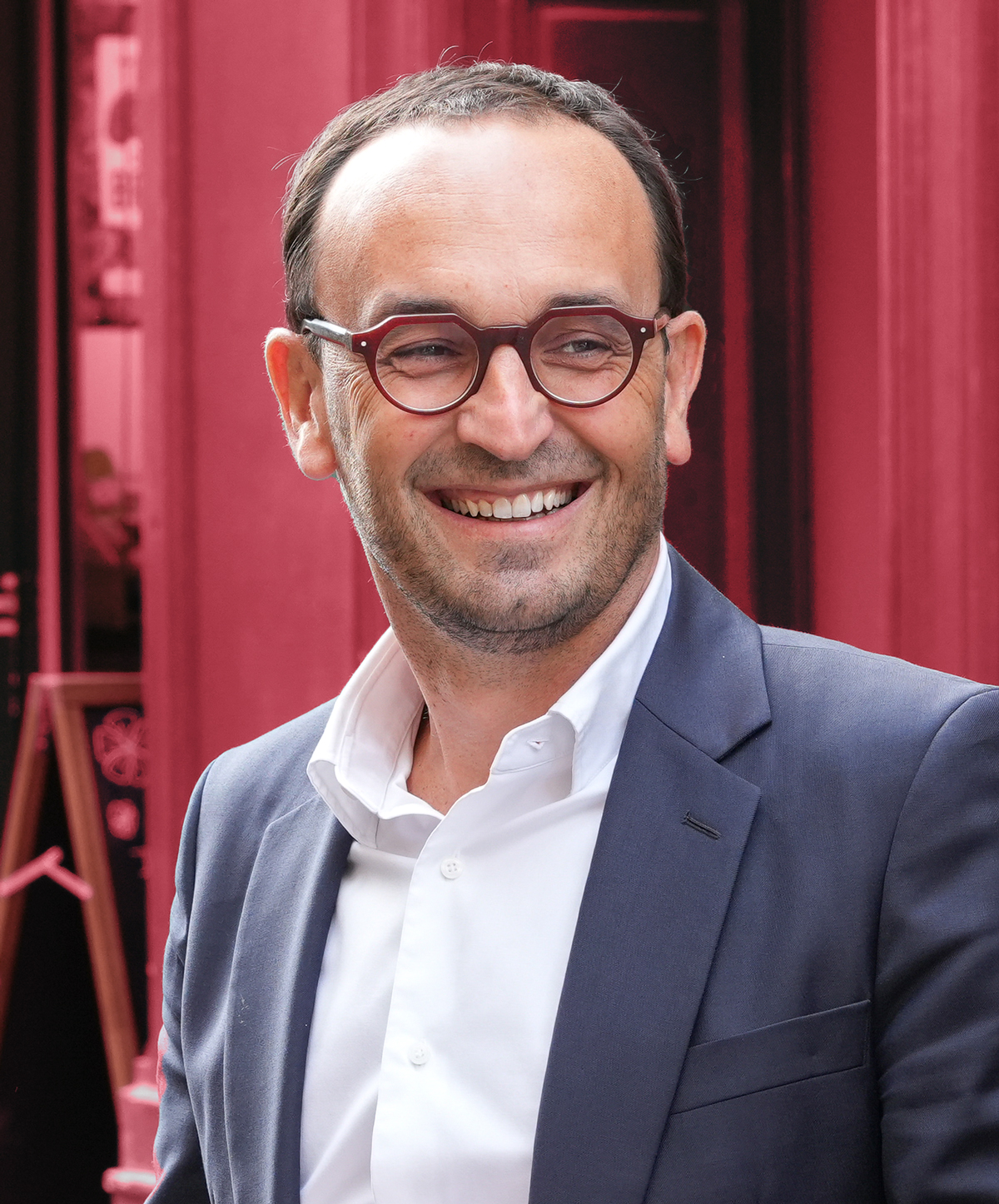
- Cazenave in 2025

Mayor of Bordeaux
- Incumbent
- Assumed office March 27, 2026
- Preceded by: Pierre Hurmic

Member of the National Assembly Gironde's 1st constituency
- In office 20 July 2024 – 26 April 2026
- Preceded by: Alexandra Martin
- Succeeded by: Alexandra Martin
- In office 21 June 2022 – 20 August 2023
- Preceded by: Dominique David
- Succeeded by: Alexandra Martin

Minister Delegate for Public Accounts
- In office 20 July 2023 – 21 September 2024
- Prime Minister: Élisabeth Borne; Gabriel Attal
- Preceded by: Gabriel Attal
- Succeeded by: Laurent Saint-Martin

Municipal councillor of Bordeaux
- Incumbent
- Assumed office 3 July 2020

Personal details
- Born: 6 March 1978 (age 48) Bordeaux, France
- Party: Renaissance
- Education: École Normale Supérieure de Cachan; Sciences Po; École nationale d'administration

Thomas Cazenave (French pronunciation: [tɔma kaznav]; born 6 March 1978) is a French civil servant and politician of the Renaissance (RE) party who is Mayor of Bordeaux. He previously served as Minister Delegate for Public Accounts in the government of successive Prime Ministers Élisabeth Borne and Gabriel Attal from 2023 to 2024.

As a finance inspector, he was an executive at Orange France and at Pôle emploi before becoming deputy chief of staff for President Emmanuel Macron at the Ministry of the Economy, then chief of staff to the Secretary of State for Industry, Christophe Sirugue.

From December 2016 to June 2017, he was Deputy Secretary General of the Presidency of the Republic and from November 2017 to November 2019, he was the interministerial delegate for public transformation.

He was head of the list of La République en Marche in the first round of the 2020 municipal elections in Bordeaux making a joint list in the second round with Nicolas Florian, the outgoing Republican Mayor. His list finished second behind the list of Pierre Hurmic's Greens who became Mayor of Bordeaux.

Cazenave then announced the creation of an opposition group, of four elected LREM and autonomous councillors distinct from that from Nicolas Florian's list.

In the 2022 French legislative election he was elected Member of Parliament for Gironde's 1st constituency.

Within the National Assembly, he was a member of the Finance Committee.

== Early life and education ==
Cazenave was born on 6 March 1978 in Bordeaux. The rest of his family has always lived in the Bordeaux region, in particular his grandmother living in Bordeaux-Bastide whom he frequently cites to signify his roots in Bordeaux.

Cazenave attended school first in Floirac then in Bordeaux, at the François-Mauriac high school in the Bastide district, where he obtained the scientific Baccalauréat. He continued his studies there in the D2 preparatory class at the Lycée Gustave-Eiffel, and at the same time in a DEUG in economics and management at Montesquieu University

In September 1998, Cazenave joined the l’École normale supérieure Paris-Saclay to follow the dual training of the economics-management department. In the 3rd year, he passed the external competition for the aggregation of economics and management. In the 4th year he completed a master's degree in economic analysis and policy from the Paris School of Economics.

Cazenave graduated from Sciences Po and was admitted following the 2004 competitive examinations, he trained at the Ecole nationale d’administration in Strasbourg from 2005 to 2007. During his training at the ENA, he did a 6-month internship at the town hall of Bordeaux, in the office of the mayor, Hugues Martin who acted as the interim mayor for Alain Juppé.

== Early career ==
Upon leaving the ENA, Cazenave joined the General Inspectorate of Finance, with Jean Bassères. While working there he met and befriended Emmanuel Macron, then also a finance inspector. In particular, together they will be assigned to the work and animation of the Commission for the Liberation of French Growth chaired by Jacques Attali, on the orders of the President of the Republic Nicolas Sarkozy. Thomas Cazenave holds the position of special rapporteur.

In 2011, Cazenave briefly worked as deputy director of Human Resources at Orange France.

In 2012–2015, Cazenave was deputy general manager of Pôle emploi, in charge of the “strategy, coordination and institutional relations” department.

Cazenave remained a teacher at the University of Paris I and at Sciences Po Paris, where he co-directed the executive master's degree in public policy management until 2016.

== Political career ==
In February 2016, he joined Emmanuel Macron at the Ministry of Economy, Industry and Digital, as deputy chief of staff. He was a supporter of the “En Marche” movement launched by Macron, which in April that year became the “La République en marche (LREM)". In September 2016, within the same ministry, he assists the Secretary of State for Industry, Christophe Sirugue, as his chief of staff.

In December 2016, Cazenave replaced Boris Vallaud as Deputy Secretary General of the Presidency of the Republic, under the mandate of President François Hollande.

As a close ally of Macron, Cazenave participated in the development of his presidential program. After the 2017 French presidential election, he was appointed to the Council of Ministers on 22 November 2017, as inter-ministerial delegate for public transformation, placed under the authority of the Prime Minister Édouard Philippe.

Cazenave resigned from his government post and placed himself on leave from the finance inspectorate in November 2019 to devote himself to the municipal elections of 2020 in Bordeaux.

In 2021, with a view to preparing LREM's program for the 2022 presidential election, he was responsible for leading the working group on the reorganization of administrations.

=== Member of the National Assembly, 2022–2023 ===
In the 2022 French legislative election, Cazenave was elected Member of Parliament for Gironde's 1st constituency with 59.11% of the vote.

In parliament, Cazenave was a member of the Finance Committee. In this capacity, he served as the parliament's rapporteur on 2023 legislation aimed at financing the energetic renovation of public buildings.

In addition to his committee assignments, Cazenave was part of the French-Québec Parliamentary Friendship Group, the French-Senegalese Parliamentary Friendship Group, and the French-Ukrainian Parliamentary Friendship Group. He also headed the National Assembly's delegation to local authorities and decentralization.

=== Municipal elections in Bordeaux, 2020 ===
In July 2019, Cazenave received the nomination of LREM for the municipal elections of 2020. Until then living between Paris and Bordeaux, he settled in his native city of Bordeaux and launched his campaign at the head of the “Bordeaux Renewal” movement. On 7 January 2020, he unveiled his first proposal. He won 12.69% of the vote in the first round of the 2020 municipal elections on 15 March 2020 and was placed in 3rd place after the ecologist Pierre Hurmic Pierre Hurmic.

Between the two rounds, Cazenave joined the candidacy of outgoing mayor Nicolas Florian. The list thus created finished in second place and Thomas Cazenave announced the creation of an opposition group, comprising four elected LREM representatives, autonomous and distinct from that from Nicolas Florian's list.

=== Minister for Public Accounts, 2023–2026 ===
On 20 July 2023, during the reshuffle of the Borne government, he succeeded Gabriel Attal as Minister for Public Accounts. His seat in parliament was taken by his substitute Alexandra Martin.

=== Mayor of Bordeaux, 2026–present ===
In the 2026 French municipal elections, Cazenave was elected Mayor of Bordeaux.

== Recognition ==
By decree of the President of the Republic of 15 November 2018, Cazenave was named Knight of the National Order of Merit for his 14 years of service, on the contingent of the Minister of Economy and Finance, Bruno Le Maire.

== See also ==
- List of deputies of the 16th National Assembly of France

== Bibliography ==
- Avec Yann Algan, L'État en mode start-up (in French). Paris: Eyrolles. 2017. p. 232. ISBN 978-2-212-56842-4..
