= Guy I de Chabot =

French courtier, soldier and governor (1514-1584)

- baron de Jarnac
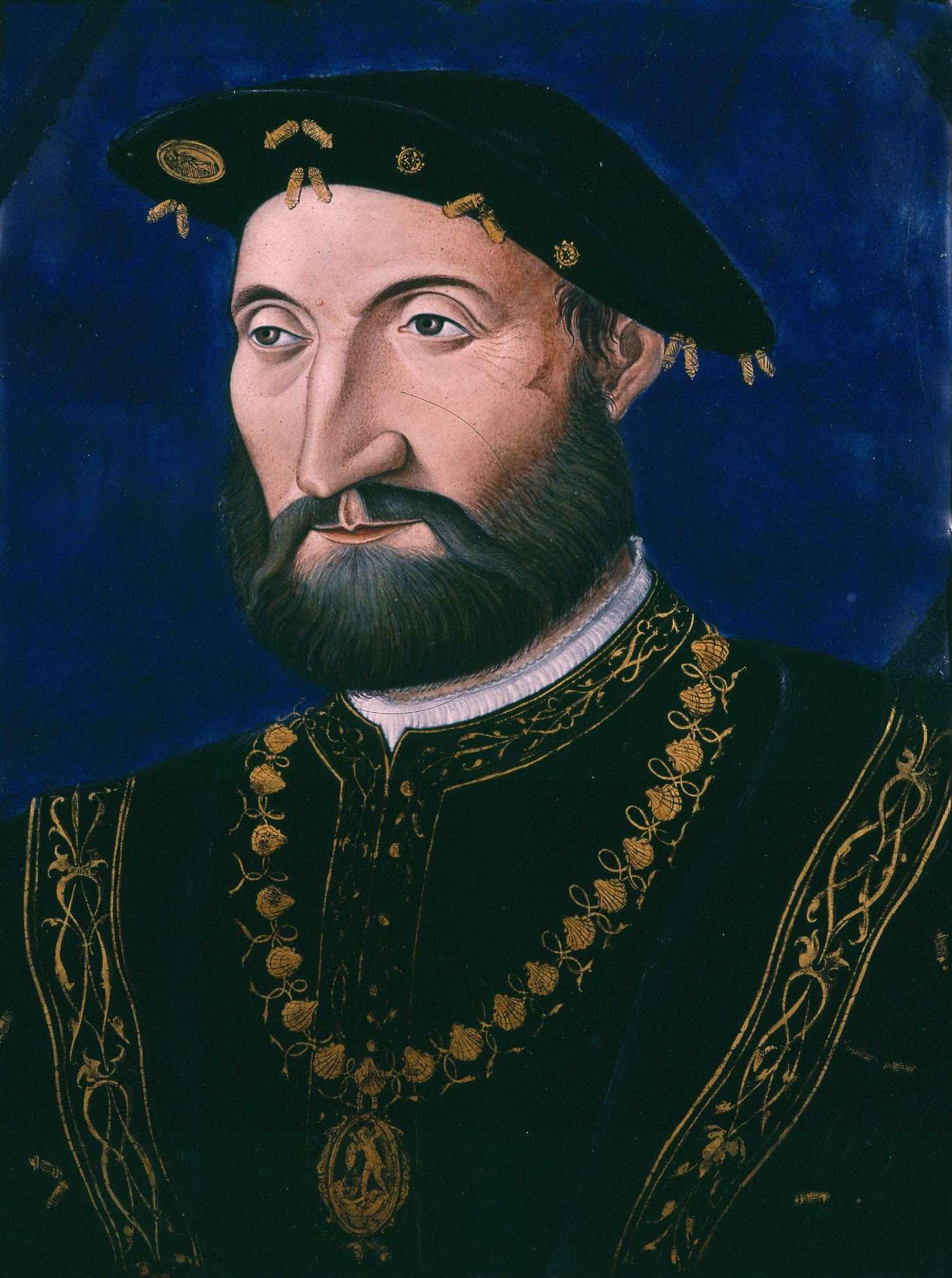
- Portrait of Jarnac, now in The Frick Collection
- Other titles: Gentilhomme de chambre of Charles IX of France
- Born: 1514; Kingdom of France
- Died: 1584 (aged 69–70)
- Family: Famille de Chabot
- Spouse: Louise de Pisseleu
- Father: Charles I de Chabot
- Mother: Jeanne de Saint-Gelais

Guy I de Chabot, seigneur de Jarnac (1514-1584) was a French courtier, soldier and governor. Rising to prominence with the elevation of his family to great office during the reign of François I, Jarnac became entangled with the great factions of court, and a marriage between himself and Louise de Pisseleu, the sister of the king's mistress, secured his centrality at court. That brought him into conflict with those around the dauphin, Henri II, and led to his famous duel with La Châtaignerie at the advent of the new king's reign.

After his victory in the duel, his family fell into disfavour in an act of revenge by his political opponents. However, he remained in personal favour and succeeded to the governorship of La Rochelle in early 1559. He struggled greatly with his Protestant co-religionists in the town, who did not share his enthusiasm for the authority of the crown. As a result, after assisting a coup during the first War of Religion, he found himself forced into exile from the town out of fear of assassination. Returning during peacetime, he again sought to stamp his authority on the town, which encouraged the king to make his will felt there. The king, however, began to tire of Jarnac's inability to bring the town to order cheaply and so exiled Jarnac from the town a second time by royal order in 1566. Once more of utility to the court, Jarnac was called to offer his services again in 1568 and attempted bring La Rochelle into order. Jarnac died in 1584.

== Early life and family ==
Guy I de Chabot, seigneur de Jarnac, had Charles I de Chabot as his father, who was governor of La Rochelle and Bourdeaux and was also mayor of La Rochelle. His uncle Philippe was a childhood friend of François I, who became Admiral of France, governor of Burgundy and was afforded a marriage to Françoise de Longwy, a relation of the king.

Jarnac married Louise de Pisseleu, the sister of Anne de Pisseleu, the king's mistress in 1541.

== Reign of François I ==
The relations between the dauphin Henri and François were tested by the latent feud between Jarnac and La Châtaigneraie, both of whom represented one of the court's key factions. Jarnac was a partisan of Anne de Pisseleu d'Heilly, whose sister he had married. He lived an opulent life at court with his stepmother, Madeleine de Puyguyon's financial backing. As a result, rumours were spread by those in Henri's faction that he was having an affair with Madeleine.

Seeking to end the rumours, Jarnac filed a suit in the Parlement of Bourdeaux on grounds of defamation and challenged the king's childhood friend La Châtaigneraie to a duel to settle the matter. The king vetoed any duel at the urging of Anne, who feared the death of her brother-in-law.

== Reign of Henri II ==
=== Feud ===
In the early months of the new regime, the feud between the two nobles boiled over. Jarnac, still incensed at the accusations of his relationship with his own stepmother, again accused those who created the rumour of lying. The assertion that the accuser had lied was an assault on aristocratic honour and necessitated a duel. While Henri's circle had originated the rumour, he could not partake in a duel due to his rank. As such, La Châtaignerie, a close childhood friend of Henri, stepped forth to take credit for the rumour. He requested permission from the king to duel Jarnac to the death, which was promptly granted. Jarnac seconded the permission by writing his own letters to the king for permission. In May 1547, the crown agreed that a duel could go ahead and provided a date for the combat of 10 July 1547.

=== Duel ===
Jarnac chose as a second Claude de Boisy, a friend of Anne de Montmorency, and La Châtaigneraie selected the duc de Guise. Guise and Montmorency represented the new leaders of the aristocratic factions in Henri's reign. Jarnac, who had been expected by his patron to lose any duel, struck quickly and disabled his opponent at the leg. Victory achieved, Jarnac turned to the king, who was present, and asked him to declare his honour restored and accept the life of his opponent, which by the rules of aristocratic duels was in Jarnac's hands with his victory. The king was shocked, caught off guard by the sudden defeat of his friend, and for a while said nothing. Eventually, at the urgings of Montmorency and his sister, he recognised Jarnac as the victor of the duel and freed him from the obligation to kill La Châtaigneraie. He would not, however, grant Jarnac the traditional words of respect that accompanied a duel victory.

=== Revenge ===
When the king had calmed down, he embraced Jarnac, praising him for having 'fought like Caesar'. La Châtaigneraie meanwhile, who was being tended to by a physician, tore off his bandages and allowed himself to bleed out, preferring death to dishonour. He could not revenge on Jarnac without appearing vindictive, but when the échevins of La Rochelle caught wind of the changing political climate, Henri was petitioned to abolish the perpetual mayoralty of the city that Charles enjoyed and to restore the town council, which he promptly did in 1548.

When the Italian Wars resumed in 1551, Jarnac would serve the king, fighting under Gaspard II de Coligny during the siege of siege of Saint-Quentin in 1557 commanding 50 lancers.

In January 1559, Jarnac was assigned as governor of the strategic Atlantic city of La Rochelle. Jarnac was subordinate to the governor Antoine of Navarre and his lieutenant general Charles de Coucis. Despite his Protestantism, he remained loyal to the crown, which was a cause for tension between him and the Protestants of the city.

== Reign of François II ==
Upon the accidental death of Henri II during a joust in 1559, Jarnac was among Navarre's close advisers who advised him to go to court to assert his rights in the uncertain political climate that accompanied the new regime.

== Reign of Charles IX ==
It was not until 1561 that Jarnac was granted entry into the town as governor by the suspicious town council, which wished to confirm that his Calvinism was genuine. He would chastise the town's Protestants for disobeying the king's edicts but allowed an expansion in public Protestant services.

=== First War of Religion ===
In early 1562, after the Massacre of Wassy, La Rochelle elected its first Protestant mayor. Jarnac, conscious that the situation in the town was deteriorating, wrote to Catherine de Medici and assured that her the majority of the town remained loyal to the crown despite several destabilising elements. He recommended a continued religious liberalisation to cool tempers in the town. With Condé's rebellion in April, elements of the town wanted to support the movement. François III La Rochefoucauld, who was in correspondence with elements inside the town, plotted a coup to seize control of the strategic centre, but the plan was foiled. Jarnac drove those loyal to him from the town with cannons. Despite his loyalty to the crown, he struggled to enforce the orders that he received from court and protested that 'enforcing changing policies is very difficult to do here.' Louis, Duke of Montpensier, who was in charge of securing Guyenne for the crown, made common cause with Jarnac in the wake of La Rochefoucauld's aborted coup and agreed with Jarnac that he would smuggle troops into the town and assert the supremacy of the crown over the troublesome town authorities. On 26 October, Montpensier struck, overwhelmed the militia and brought the town under his command.

Jarnac's involvement in the countercoup shattered his credibility in the town's elites, and with threats of his assassination in the air, he fled the town on 3 November. As a result, he found himself forced into exile from his governorship in much the same manner as Claude de Savoie in Provence.

=== Long peace ===
With peace declared, Jarnac was afforded a return to the town. He chose as his lieutenant Amateur Blandin, a staunch royalist from the Présidaux court. The choice further alienated the suspicious grandees from Jarnac. When Charles embarked upon his royal tour of France to investigate deviations from the Edict of Amboise and to enforce his authority on the troubled kingdom, Jarnac urged him to conduct an inspection of La Rochelle. The king obliged Jarnac and entered the town in September 1565. Montmorency, who was at the head of the advance guard, promptly confiscated all of La Rochelle's artillery. Informed by Jarnac of Protestant troublemakers in the town, Charles quickly implemented a series of decrees, designed to suppress dissent in the town. Jarnac was granted the prerogative to choose from among the leading candidates which would become mayor. He was further granted all of the cannons that Montmorency had seized.

=== Fall from favour ===
After the king had departed, Protestant worship resumed in the town. Jarnac remained in the town for a time, the threats against his life having increased to the point that he rarely left his house without twenty bodyguards. He wrote desperately to the court and pleaded for no reduction in funding for the gendarmerie in the town. In 1566, conscious of economic pressures, Charles ordered Jarnac to disband his bodyguard, the crown no longer willing to pay for the security of La Rochelle's unpopular governor. He furthered that with a request for Jarnac to vacate the town and to turn over the arsenal to the mayor. Jarnac protested strongly by reminding the king of the seditious nature of the Protestants in La Rochelle. Only when the lieutenant-general of Poitiers came to the town and read the kings order's directly to him would Jarnac at last quit the town.

=== Second War of Religion ===
Reduced to sulking in his château, Jarnac turned on his lieutenant, Blandin, by opposing Blandin when he ran for mayor in the town on the grounds it violated the king's edicts. Charles, increasingly tired of Jarnac, ignored his protestations and confirmed Blandin as mayor. When civil war resumed in 1568, the Protestants of La Rochelle seized the town and declared for Condé. Jarnac was ordered by the king to raise troops to bring the troublesome town back into obedience. The town, now under a Protestant junta led by Pontard, refused Jarnac when he tried to bring his garrison into the town, and he was unable to enforce his will on the well-defended town. Jarnac died in 1584.

== Sources ==
- Baumgartner, Frederic (1988). Henry II: King of France 1547-1559. Duke University Press.
- Harding, Robert (1978). Anatomy of a Power Elite: the Provincial Governors in Early Modern France. Yale University Press.
- Knecht, Robert (1994). Renaissance Warrior and Patron: The Reign of Francis I. Cambridge University Press.
- Robbins, Kevin (1997). City on the Ocean Sea: La Rochelle, 1530-1650 Urban Society, Religion and Politics on the French Atlantic Frontier. Brill.
- Roelker, Nancy (1968). Queen of Navarre: Jeanne d'Albret 1528-1572. Harvard University Press.
- Sandret, Louis (1886). Histoire généalogique de la maison de Chabot. Impr. de V. Forest et E. Grimaud.
