= Sandrine Doucet =

French politician (1959–2019)

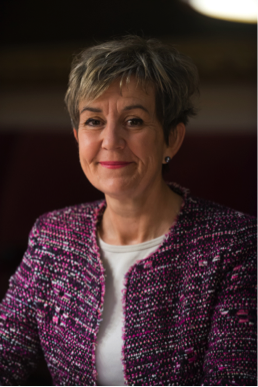

Member of the National Assembly for Gironde's 1st constituency
- In office 2012–2017
- Preceded by: Chantal Bourragué
- Succeeded by: Dominique David

Personal details
- Born: 10 September 1959 Talence, France
- Died: 4 February 2019 (aged 59) Bordeaux, France
- Cause of death: Cancer
- Party: Socialist Party
- Profession: Teacher

Sandrine Doucet (10 September 1959 – 4 February 2019) was a French politician. As a member of the Socialist Party, she served as a Deputy between 2012 and 2017, representing Gironde's 1st constituency.

Citing health reasons, Doucet did not seek re-election in 2017. She died of cancer at age 59 on 4 February 2019.
