= Battle of Blanquefort =

Battle of Hundred Years War

- Part of the Hundred Years' War
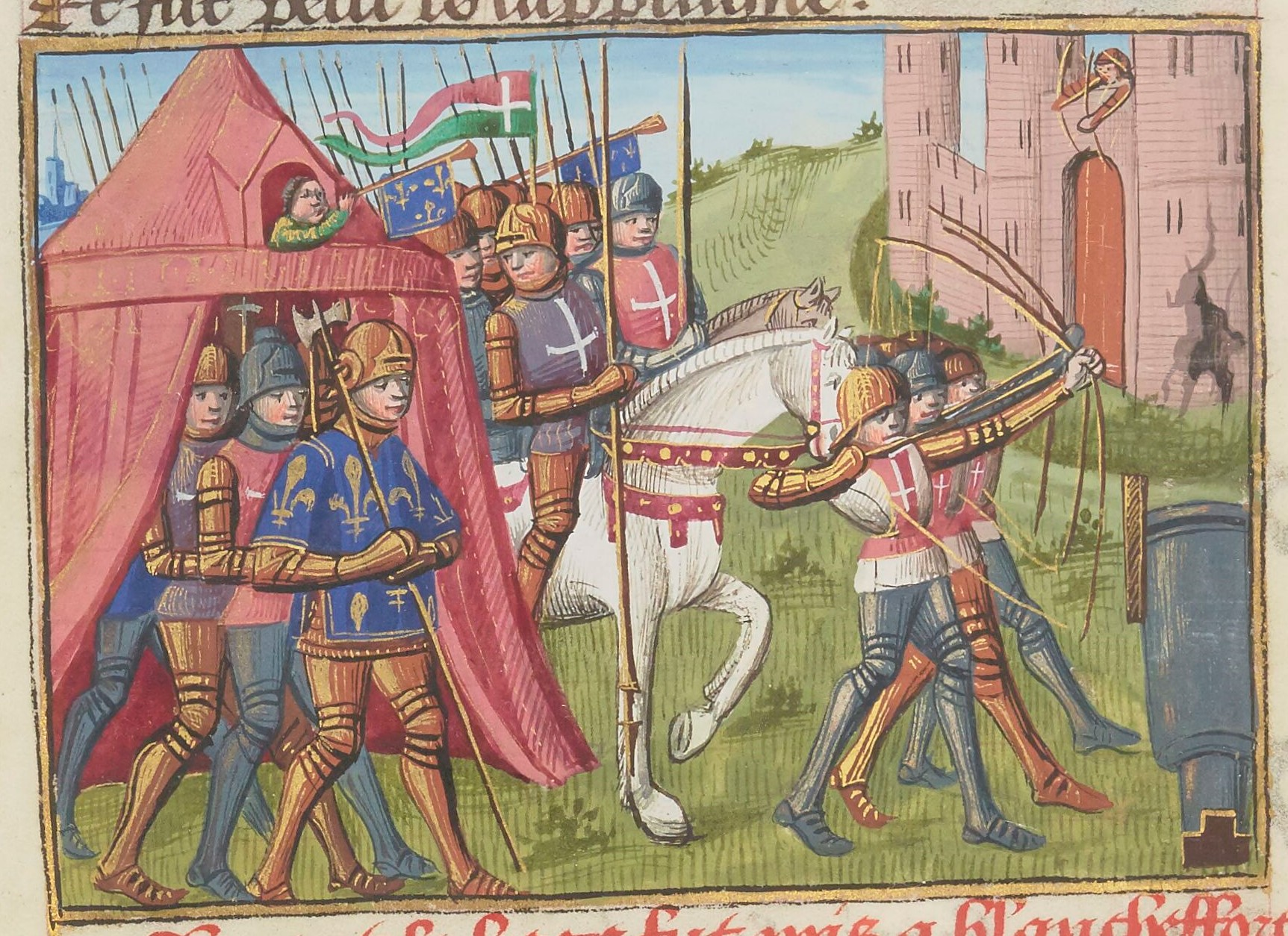
- Battle of Blanquefort, miniature from the Vigiles du roi Charles VII by Martial d'Auvergne, c. 1484
Date	1 November 1450
Location	Gascony
Result	French victory

Belligerents
Kingdom of England; Duchy of Gascony	Kingdom of France

Commanders and leaders
Gadifer Shorthose; Thomas Gassiot	Arnaud-Amanieu d'Albret; John, Count of Penthièvre; Robin Pettilow

Strength
7,000–10,000 men	400–3,000 men

Casualties and losses
1,500–2,500 killed 1,200-2,500 captured	Unknown

The Battle of Blanquefort or La Male Journade took place on 1 November 1450 during the Hundred Years' war when a French army drew out Anglo-Gascon forces from Bordeaux in the English-controlled Duchy of Gascony. The Anglo-Gascon infantry suffered heavy losses, and the battle resulted in a decisive French victory. The battle was known locally as La Male Journade or in French Mauvaise Journée and marked the beginning of a campaign to drive the English from Gascony.

== The Battle ==
At the first engagement, at a place called Jallepont, the first French lines slipped away on purpose and led the Anglo-Gascons in pursuit until they reached a cul-de-sac closed by the banks of the Jalle. It was a trap: Robin Petit-Loup’s archers were hidden in the surrounding woods and decimated the pursuers in nearly an hour of heavy fire. Meanwhile, Arnaud-Amanieu d'Albret, seigneur d'Orval, the grandson of Charles I d'Albret who died at Agincourt, closed his lines with a pincer movement which took the English from the flanks.

The survivors, overcome by panic, fled towards Bordeaux. A French chronicler, Jean Chartier, called into question the cowardice of Gadifier Shartoise, the English mayor of Bordeaux, whom he accused of abandoning all his soldiers on foot to flee towards Bordeaux.

The French knights pursued the fugitives for several kilometres, and killed all those from whom no ransom could be expected. Only the nobles and the rich bourgeois escaped the massacre.

The magnitude of the losses sounded the death knell for the last hopes of the English to resist the French in southwestern France.
