= Rostan de Soler =

French knight and administrator

Rostan de Soler (Note: Also Rostang de Solar, Rostand del Soler, Rostein du Soler.) was a 13th-century French knight and administrator who served as lieutenant of the Seneschal of Gascony in 1231 and then Seneschal of Gascony 1241–43. During his seneschalcy, King Henry III of England, who was also the hereditary Duke of Aquitaine and Gascony, launched the a war against France. One of the lead citizens (prud'hommes) of Bordeaux, he served two terms as mayor there in 1237–38 and 1241.

== Life ==
Soler was the son of Rostan de Soler. Following his father, he became the head of the family, one of the most prominent in Bordeaux. In 1216, he was a prisoner of King John of England being held in Corfe Castle. On John's death that year he was released on the orders of the regent, William Marshal.

Rostan served as Mayor of Bordeaux from 26 March 1237 until 13 March 1238. In 1241 he was again elected mayor and served from 22 July. Until when is not known. Higounet has him leaving office on 24 September that same year, after having been appointed seneschal. Bémont has him continuing in office until the next known mayor, Pierre Béguey, was installed on 9 July 1242. This would mean that he was both mayor and seneschal simultaneously, a unique occurrence.

Rostan was appointed on 22 September 1241, as Seneschal of Gascony, replacing Henry de Turberville. Rostan resigned the position on 10 November 1242 and was replaced by John Maunsell. During 1249, the Solers family and the Colom family fought over political control of Bordeaux. Simon de Monfort, the Seneschal of Gascony, put down the factional fighting, arresting Rostan and sending him to England to appear before Henry III. Rostan was succeeded by his son Gaillard.

== Marriage and issue ==
Rostan was married to Honorette Aymar and are known to have had the following known issue:

- Gaillard de Soler, married to Esclarmonde de Tartas, had issue.
