= Dominique David =

French entrepreneur & politician (born 1963)

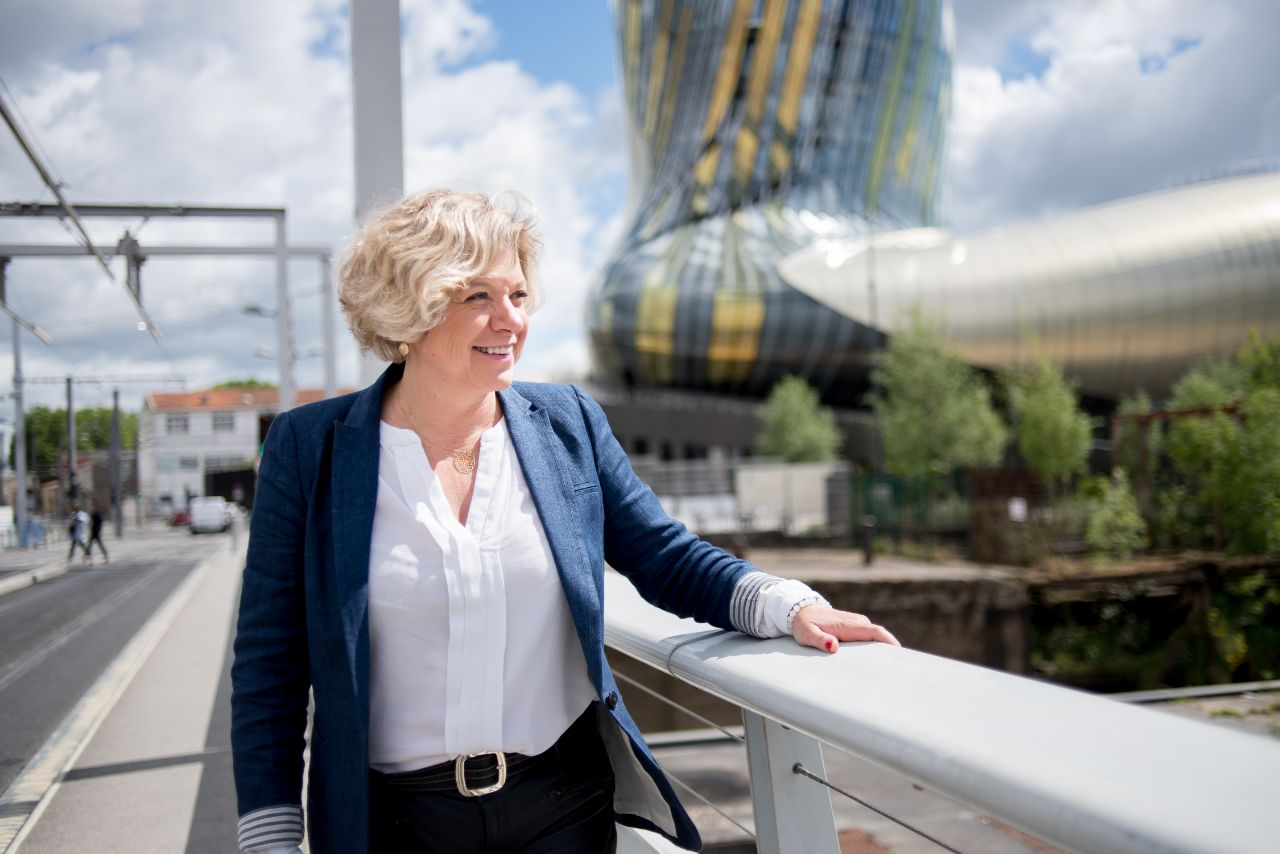
- Image of Dominique David on the Pont Jacques Chaban-Delmas

Member of the National Assembly for Gironde's 1st constituency
- In office 21 June 2017 – 21 June 2022
- Preceded by: Sandrine Doucet
- Succeeded by: Thomas Cazenave

Personal details
- Born: 27 February 1963 (age 63) Montpellier, France
- Party: La République En Marche!

Dominique David (French pronunciation: [dɔminik david]; born 27 February 1963) is a French entrepreneur and politician of La République En Marche! (LREM) who was elected to the French National Assembly in the 2017 elections, representing the department of Gironde.

== Political career ==
In parliament, David served on the National Defence and Armed Forces Committee.

== Political positions ==
In July 2019, David voted in favor of the French ratification of the European Union's Comprehensive Economic and Trade Agreement (CETA) with Canada.
