= Pierre Hurmic =

French politician (born 1955)

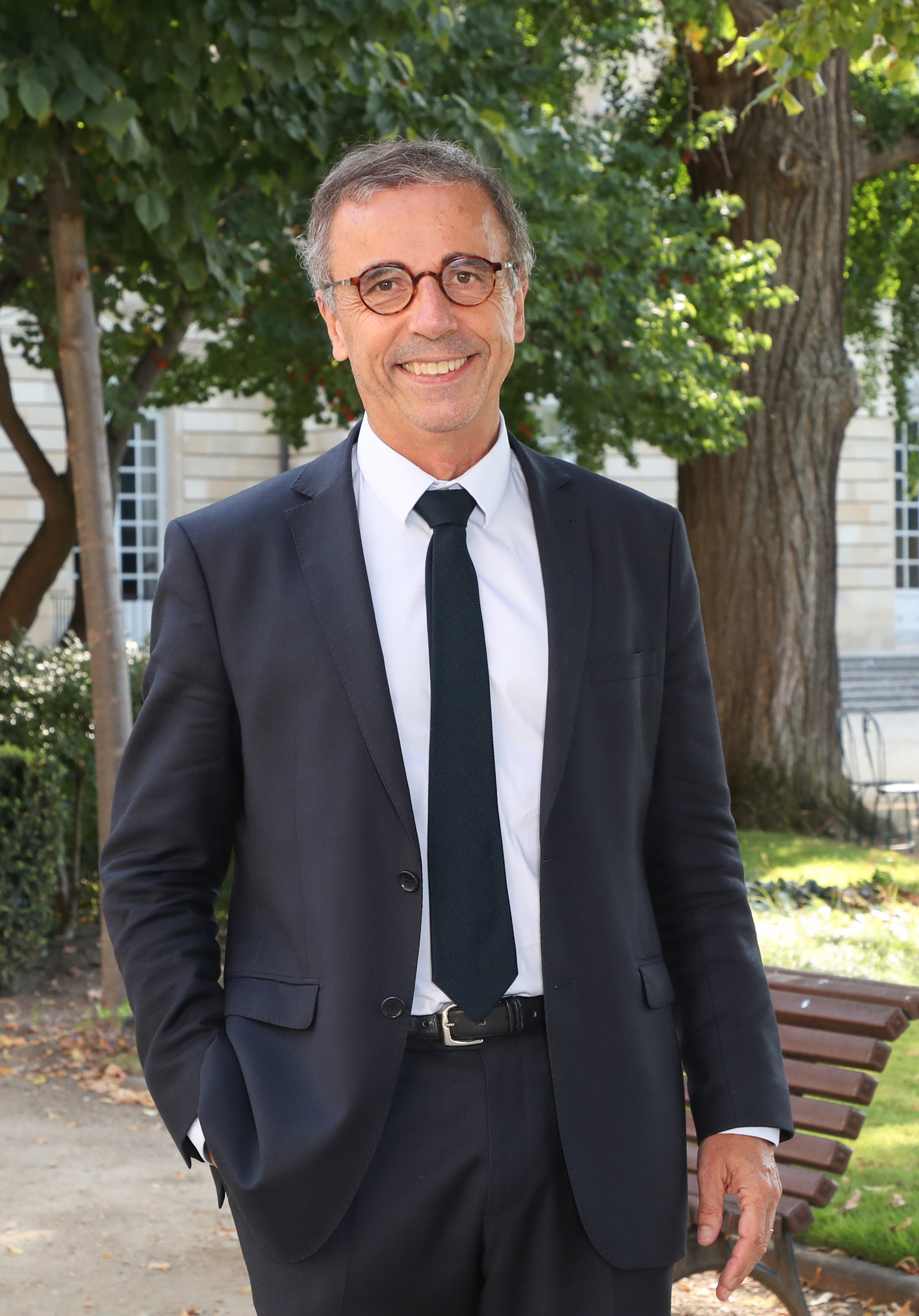

Mayor of Bordeaux
- In office 3 July 2020 – 27 March 2026
- Preceded by: Nicolas Florian
- Succeeded by: Thomas Cazenave

Member of the Regional Council of Aquitaine
- In office 27 March 1992 – 28 March 2004

Personal details
- Born: 10 April 1955 (age 71) Saint-Palais, France
- Party: Ecology Generation (1990–1994); The Greens (1998–2010); Europe Ecology – The Greens (2010–present)
- Education: Sciences Po Bordeaux
- Occupation: Lawyer

Pierre Hurmic (French pronunciation: [pjɛʁ yʁmik]; born 10 April 1955) is a French lawyer and politician who served as Mayor of Bordeaux from 2020 to 2026. A member of Europe Ecology – The Greens (EELV), he has been continuously elected to the municipal council of Bordeaux since 1995. In 2020, he defeated incumbent Nicolas Florian for the mayorship. In 2026, he was defeated for a second term by Thomas Cazenave.

After 25 years in opposition to Alain Juppé and Florian, Hurmic was elected as mayor, bringing the city back to the left after 73 years of right-wing rule. He led a coalition made up of EELV, the Socialist Party, Génération.s and the French Communist Party.

== See also ==
- List of mayors of Bordeaux
