= Chantal Bourragué =

French politician (born 1946)

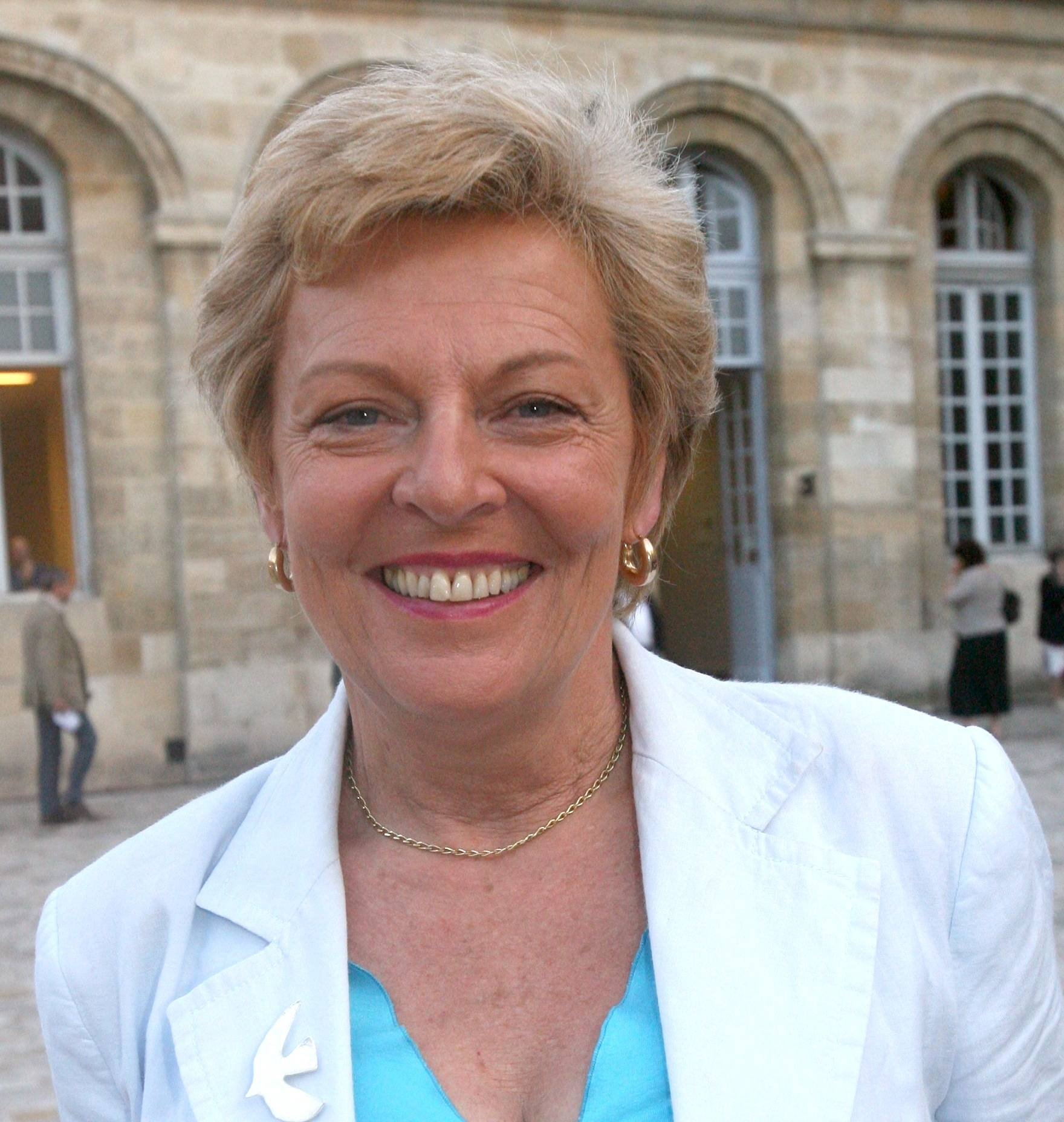

Member of the National Assembly for Gironde's 1st constituency
- In office 2002–2012
- Preceded by: Jean Valleix
- Succeeded by: Sandrine Doucet

Personal details
- Born: 3 March 1946 (age 80) Angoulême, France
- Party: UMP
- Education: University of Bordeaux

Chantal Bourragué (born 3 March 1946 in Angoulême, Charente) is a member of the National Assembly of France. She represents the first constituency of the Gironde department and is a member of the Union for a Popular Movement.
