= Gironde's 1st constituency =

Constituency of the National Assembly of France

1st constituency of Gironde
- inline Constituency of the National Assembly of France

- Location of constituency in Department

- Location of Gironde in France
- Deputy: Thomas Cazenave; RE
- Department: Gironde
- Cantons: (pre-2015) Bordeaux-1, Bordeaux-2, Bordeaux-8, Bouscat
- Registered voters: 139,987

The 1st constituency of the Gironde (French: Première circonscription de la Gironde) is a French legislative constituency in Gironde département. Like the other 576 French constituencies, it elects one MP using the two-round system, with a run-off if no candidate receives over 50% of the vote in the first round.

== Deputies ==
Election	Member	Party
1958	Arthur Richards	UNR
1962	Arthur Richards	UNR
1967	Jean Valleix	UDR
1968	Jean Valleix	UDR
1973	Jean Valleix	UDR
1978	Jean Valleix	RPR
1981	Jean Valleix	RPR
1986	Proportional representation - no election by constituency	
1988	Jean Valleix	RPR
1993	Jean Valleix	RPR
1997	Jean Valleix	RPR
2002	Chantal Bourragué	UMP
2007	Chantal Bourragué	UMP
2012	Sandrine Doucet	PS
2017	Dominique David	LREM
2022	Thomas Cazenave	RE
2023	Alexandra Martin	RE
2024	Thomas Cazenave	RE

== Election results ==
=== 2024 ===
Candidate	Party	Alliance	First round			Second round		
Candidate	Party	Alliance	Votes	%	+/–	Votes	%	+/–
Thomas Cazenave	RE	Ensemble	28,564	38.31	+0.08	31,768	43.20	-15.91
Céline Papin	LE	NFP	25,517	34.23	+6.92	26,425	35.94	-4.95
Bruno Paluteau	RN		15,654	21.00	+11.39	15,336	20.86	new
Béatrice Pomarel	DVC		3,143	4.22	new			
Virginie Tournay	REC		1,164	1.56	-4.03			
Fanny Quandalle	LO		511	0.69	+0.20			
Votes			74,553	100.00		73,529	100.00	
Valid votes			74,553	98.17	-0.33	73,529	98.17	+3.46
Blank votes			1,002	1.32	+0.21	1,064	1.42	-2.42
Null votes			388	0.51	+0.12	305	0.41	-1.04
Turnout			75,943	71.74	+21.73	74,898	70.74	+22.21
Abstentions			29,920	28.26	-21.73	30,979	29.26	-22.21
Registered voters			105,863			105,877		
Result			RE HOLD					

=== 2022 ===
Legislative Election 2022: Gironde's 1st constituency
Party	Candidate	Votes	%	±%
LREM (Ensemble)	Thomas Cazenave	19,604	38.23	-5.72
EELV (NUPÉS)	Catherine Cestari	14,006	27.31	+3.52
RN	Bruno Paluteau	4,929	9.61	+3.83
LR (UDC)	Pierre De Gaetan Njikam	4,116	8.03	−12.04
REC	Jean-Louis Grattepanche	2,866	5.59	N/A
FGR	Damien Thomas	1,794	3.50	N/A
HOR	Xavier Loustaunau*	1,226	2.39	N/A
Others	N/A	2,740		
Turnout		51,281	50.01	−1.25
2nd round result
LREM (Ensemble)	Thomas Cazenave	28,292	59.11	-0.48
EELV (NUPÉS)	Catherine Cestari	19,569	40.89	N/A
Turnout		47,861	48.53	+8.01
LREM hold				

* Horizons dissident

=== 2017 ===
Candidate	Label	First round		Second round	
Candidate	Label	Votes	%	Votes	%
Dominique David	REM	21,173	43.95	20,645	59.59
Nicolas Florian	LR	9,670	20.07	14,000	40.41
Evelyne Cervantes-Descubes	FI	5,261	10.92		
Philippe Dorthe	PS	3,437	7.13		
Philippe Dubois	FN	2,786	5.78		
Nelson Palis-Niermann	ECO	1,873	3.89		
Vincent Maurin	PCF	889	1.85		
Laurent Blanchard	ECO	517	1.07		
Audrey Teillet	DIV	454	0.94		
Pierre Lareigne	DVD	403	0.84		
Sophie Barakat	DLF	390	0.81		
Cyril Faucher	DIV	334	0.69		
Thérèse Claise	DVG	261	0.54		
Isabelle Larroquet	EXG	221	0.46		
Paul Artaut	DIV	181	0.38		
Fanny Quandalle	EXG	175	0.36		
Pierre Dinet	EXD	107	0.22		
Johan Giraud-Girard	DIV	31	0.06		
Adrien Doutreix	EXG	8	0.02		
Votes		48,171	100.00	34,645	100.00
Valid votes		48,171	98.94	34,645	90.01
Blank votes		364	0.75	2,855	7.42
Null votes		152	0.31	992	2.58
Turnout		48,687	51.26	38,492	40.52
Abstentions		46,299	48.74	56,496	59.48
Registered voters		94,986		94,988	
Source: Ministry of the Interior

=== 2012 ===
2012 legislative election in Gironde's 1st constituency
Candidate	Party	First round		Second round	
Candidate	Party	Votes	%	Votes	%
Chantal Bourragué	UMP	19,926	40.22%	23,325	48.51%
Sandrine Doucet	PS	19,397	39.16%	24,759	51.49%
Catherine Bouilhet	FN	4,188	8.45%		
Vincent Maurin	FG	2,454	4.95%		
Alexandre Marsat	EELV	2,125	4.29%		
Isabelle Larroquet	NPA	367	0.74%		
Marie-Pierre Mauhourat	MEI	304	0.61%		
Olivier Rachet	DVG (BAG)	234	0.47%		
Corinne Gireau	PP	218	0.44%		
Mohamed Akrout	AEI	192	0.39%		
Denis Lacoste	LO	132	0.27%		
Valid votes		49,537	98.88%	48,084	97.75%
Spoilt and null votes		562	1.12%	1,105	2.25%
Votes cast / turnout		50,099	58.24%	49,189	57.17%
Abstentions		35,926	41.76%	36,846	42.83%
Registered voters		86,025	100.00%	86,035	100.00%

=== 2007 ===
Legislative Election 2007: Gironde's 1st constituency
Party	Candidate	Votes	%	±%
UMP	Chantal Bourragué	22,718	44.81	
PS	Béatrice Desaigues	12,874	25.39	
MoDem	Véronique Fayet	7,112	14.03	
LV	Marc Lasaygues	1,860	3.67	
PCF	Vincent Maurin	1,633	3.22	
FN	Valérie Colombier	1,528	3.01	
Far left	Isabelle Larroquet	1,271	2.51	
Others	N/A	1,702		
Turnout		51,208	62.07	
2nd round result
UMP	Chantal Bourragué	26,349	54.45	
PS	Béatrice Desaigues	22,042	45.55	
Turnout		49,624	60.15	
UMP hold				

=== 2002 ===
Legislative Election 2002: Gironde's 1st constituency
Party	Candidate	Votes	%	±%
UMP	Chantal Bourragué	23,285	47.97	
PS	Beatrice Desaigues	12,379	25.50	
FN	Jacques Colombier	4,202	8.66	
LV	Marie-Claude Noel	2,140	4.41	
PCF	Vincent Maurin	1,656	3.41	
Others	N/A	4,878		
Turnout		49,212	67.52	
2nd round result
UMP	Chantal Bourragué	25,151	59.71	
PS	Beatrice Desaigues	16,974	40.29	
Turnout		43,478	59.65	
UMP hold				

=== 1997 ===
Legislative Election 1997: Gironde's 1st constituency
Party	Candidate	Votes	%	±%
RPR	Jean Valleix	16,950	37.60	
PS	Beatrice Desaigues	11,725	26.01	
FN	Jacques Colombier	5,095	11.30	
PCF	Vincent Maurin	3,048	6.76	
DVD	Stephane de Bentzmann	1,746	3.87	
LV	Valérie Le Goff	1,138	2.52	
Others	N/A	5,382		
Turnout		56,978	67.15	
2nd round result
RPR	Jean Valleix	26,175	54.99	
PS	Beatrice Desaigues	21,425	45.01	
Turnout		49,904	71.34	
RPR hold				

== Sources ==
- French Interior Ministry results website: "Résultats électoraux officiels en France" (in French).
