= Léonor Chabot =

French noble and lieutenant-general (-1597)

- comte de Charny comte de Busançais
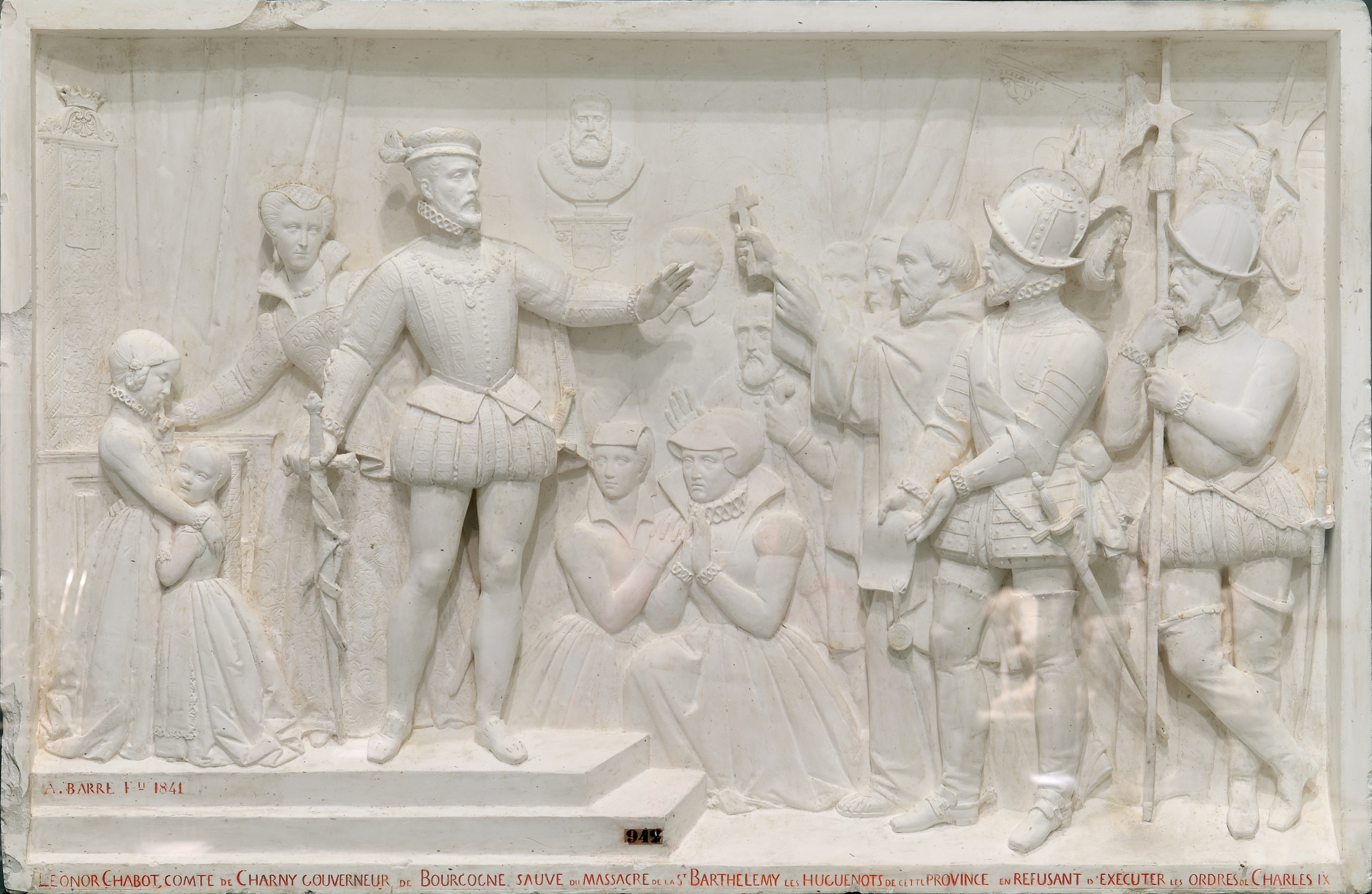
- Charny protecting the Protestants of Dijon during the St. Bartholomew's Day Massacre
- Died: August 1597
- Noble family: Maison de Chabot
- Spouses: Claude Gouffier; Françoise de Rye
- Issue: Catherine Chabot; Charlotte Chabot; Marguerite Chabot; Catherine Chabot; Françoise Chabot; Léonore Chabot
- Father: Philippe Chabot
- Mother: Françoise de Longwy

Léonor Chabot, comte de Charny and Busançais (–1597) was a French noble, military commander, lieutenant-general and royal courtier during the reigns of Charles IX, Henri III and Henri IV. The son of the Admiral of France and Françoise de Longwy Charny was elevated rapidly, being inducted into the royal chivalric order of Saint-Michel in 1555. In 1571 he became lieutenant-general of Bourgogne, succeeding his uncle-in-law Marshal Tavannes, he quickly followed this by succeeding to one of the great offices of state, that of Grand Écuyer, a charge previously held by his father-in-law the sieur de Boisy. During the St. Bartholomew's Day Massacre he protected the Protestants of Dijon. In 1578 he became a conseiller d'État (councillor of state) and seneschal of Bourgogne.

During the crisis of the Catholic ligue he was looked to by the court to be a reliable royalist and oppose the duc de Mayenne, the ligueur governor of Burgundy, under whom he was technically subordinate. Charny had a key role to play in the crisis that followed the deposition of the ligueur aligned governor of Auxonne in November 1585, acting as the protector of Henri's interests in the governate. He first tried to appeal to the city, but when that failed Henri appointed him temporary governor of the city while the ligueur baron de Sennecey would assume more permanent command. He was refused entry to Auxonne however, and the city began to arm for its defence, much to his annoyance. The king resolved to force the town back into obedience, and Charny was tasked with supporting the siege of the city. However neither he nor the king were particularly interested in seeing the siege brought to a rapid conclusion, that might benefit the ligue and therefore his force was too weak to conduct a siege. The city was negotiated into surrender in August 1586. In early 1589 Charny sold the office of grand écuyer to the new royal favourite the baron de Termes, he was soon afterwards forcefully dispossessed of the lieutenant-generalcy of Bourgogne by the rebellious duc de Mayenne, who installed the seigneur de Fervaques in his stead. In 1597 he died, and was succeeded by his five surviving daughters to his lands.

== Early life and family ==
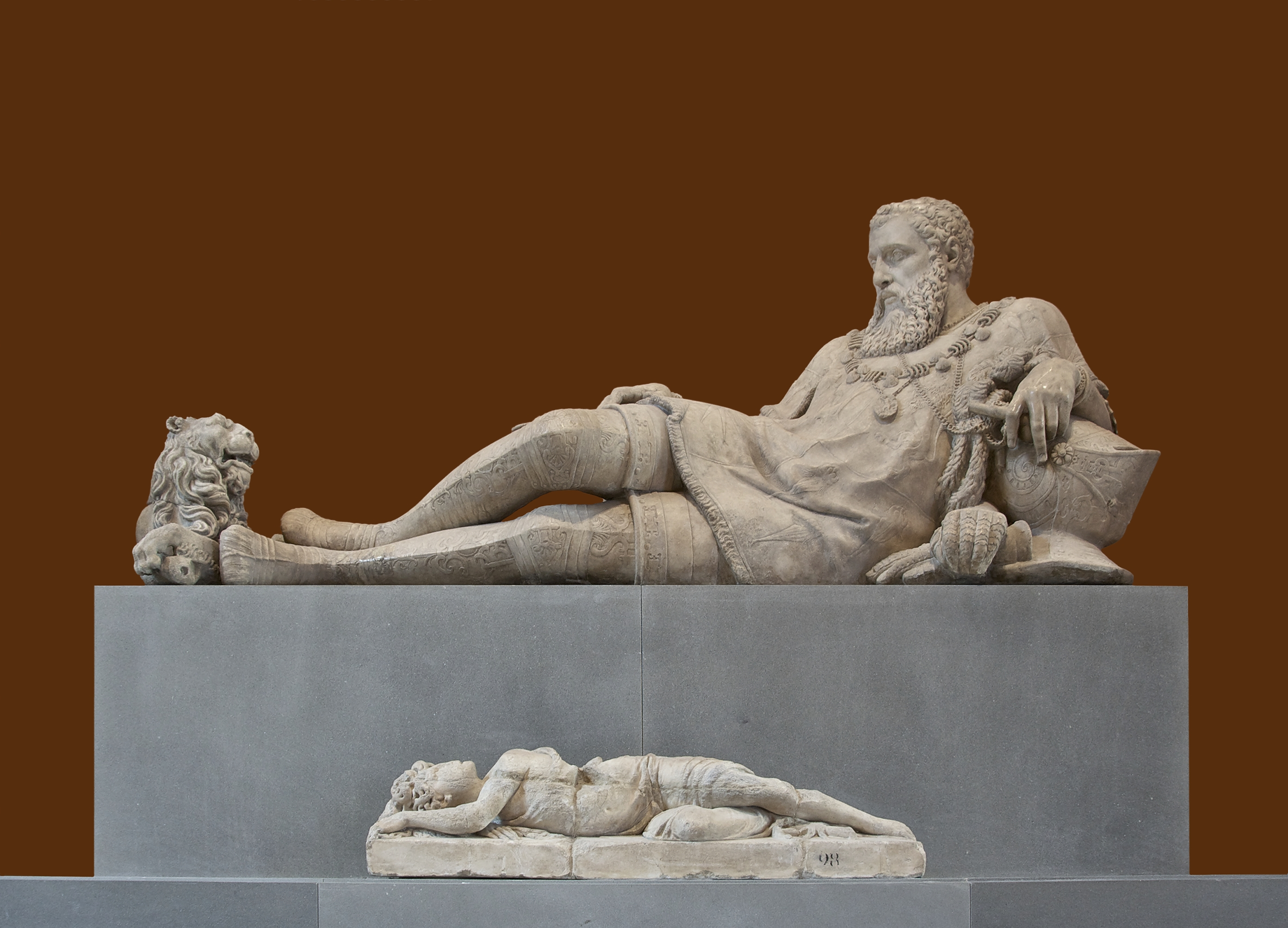
Admiral Chabot one of the chief favourites of François I

Léonor Chabot was the son of Philippe Chabot, the Admiral of France and Françoise de Longwy the dame de Pagny.

=== Marriages and children ===
He was married twice, first in February 1549 to Claude Gouffier, the daughter of the grand écuyer (grand squire) of France, Claude Gouffier. His second marriage was to Françoise de Rye. Across the two marriages he would have six daughters:

- Catherine Chabot (–-1609) married in 1576 the prominent member of the noblesse seconde of Bourgogne, Guillaume de Saulx who would serve as lieutenant in the company of the governor of Bourgogne the duc de Mayenne. Guillaume de Saulx was the eldest son of the Marshal de Tavannes.
- Charlotte Chabot (–-1606) was married in 1578 to the son of one of the lieutenant-generals of Normandie, Jacques Le Veneur. The couple had issue.

Of his second marriage:

- Marguerite Chabot (–1652), was married to the duc d'Elbeuf in February 1583. Charny agreed that he would as part of the arrangement cede his control over the grand écuyer title to the house of Lorraine. She also brought the seigneurie of Pagny (including the château) with her, and a lump sum of 12,000 livres
- Catherine Chabot (–1588) married in 1584 to Claude de Vergy, she would die without the couple having had issue.
- Françoise Chabot (–1602) whose marriage was arranged in 1588 with the son of the chancellor of France Cheverny, Henri Hurault. This marriage was very prestigious for Cheverny to be married into a family of Chabot's stock.
- Léonore Chabot (–1618) married Christophe de Rie, the comte de Varas in 1598.

== Reign of Henri II ==
In 1555 Charny was established as a chevalier (knight) of the Ordre de Saint-Michel (Order of Saint-Michel) at that time the most senior royal chivalric order in France. Four years later he entered the royal household as a gentilhomme ordinaire de la chambre du roi (ordinary gentleman of the kings chamber).

== Reign of Charles IX ==
From 1564 to 1566 the court undertook a grand tour of the kingdom at the instigation of the queen mother Catherine who desired to re-establish royal authority throughout the realm, which had been shaken by the recent civil war, and to ensure the Peace of Amboise which had brought the conflict to a close was being properly enforced. While the court was passing through Bourgogne, Charny ensured they crossed the Saône by boat so they could spend some time at his château de Pagny at the end of May, before they continued on their way down to Provence.

=== Lieutenant-general ===
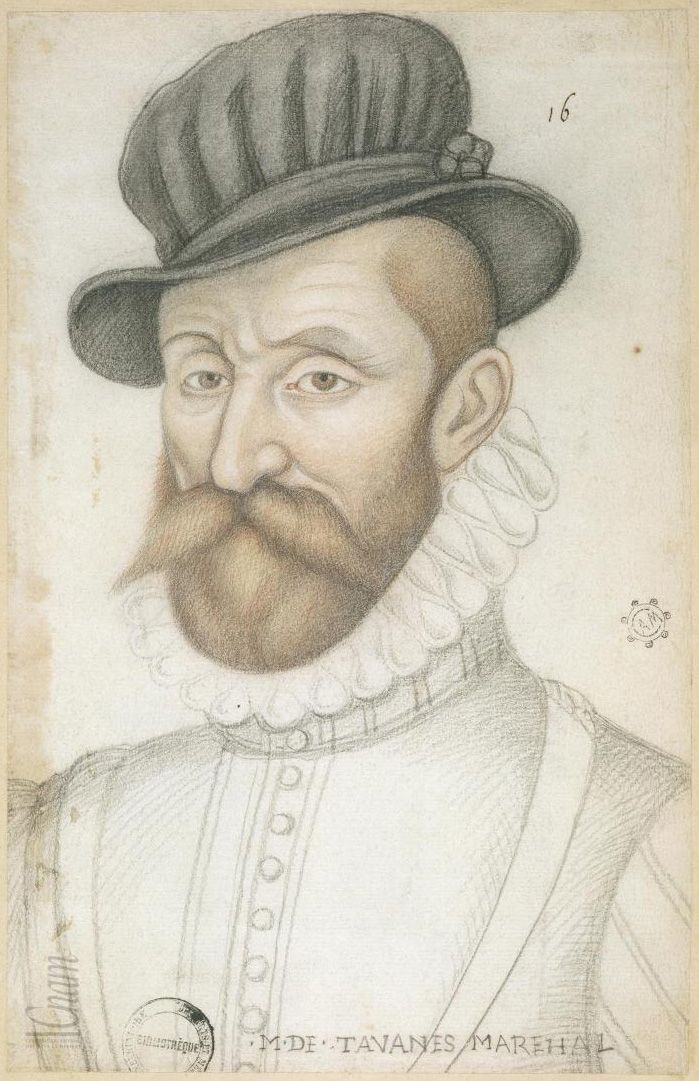
Marshal Tavannes lieutenant-general of Bourgogne

Charny succeeded Marshal Tavannes to the charge of lieutenant-general of Bourgogne in 1570. He initially served under the governor the duc d'Aumale who was fairly hands off in his governance of Bourgogne, however upon Aumale's death in 1573 he was succeeded by his nephew, the duc de Mayenne who was determined to have a far more hands on role in the administration of Bourgogne.

=== Grand Écuyer ===
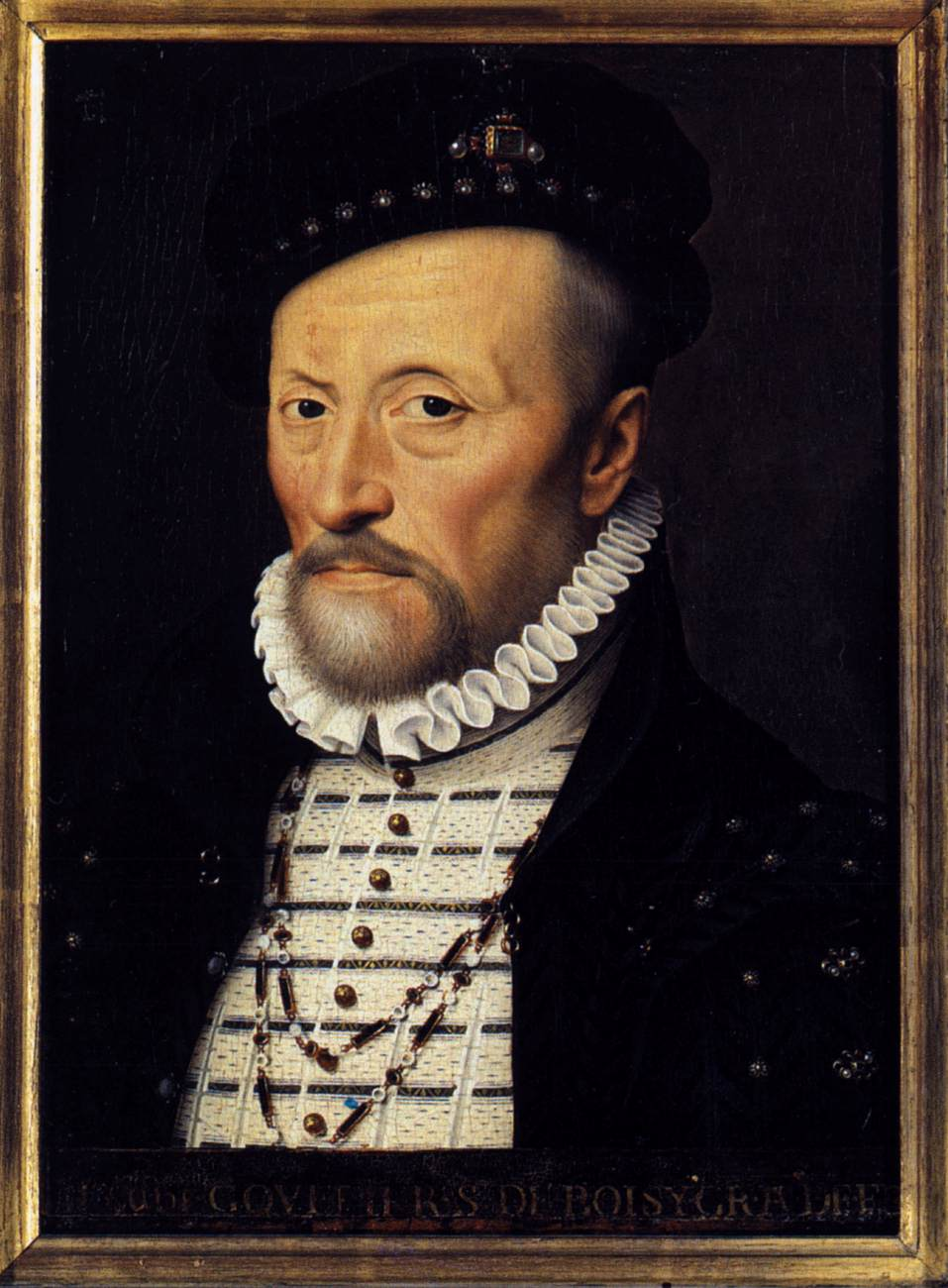
Sieur de Boisy, grand écuyer of France

In 1571 Charny assumed the responsibilities of one of the great offices of the crown, that of Grand Écuyer (Great Squire), he succeeded the sieur de Boisy (his father-in-law) who had died in possession of the office in December 1570. As Grand Écuyer, Charny was sometimes referred to as seigneur le Grand.

After the occasion of Charles IX's marriage to queen Elisabeth (celebrated on 21 November 1570) it was decided that both Charles and Elisabeth would have solemn entries into the capital. This was a great occasion, designed to celebrate the return of peace and the unity of the houses of Valois and Habsburg. This was a grand occasion, and in March 1571 the king made his entry. A procession featuring the bourgeois of Paris, the prévot des marchands (provost of the merchants), the officers of the Châtelet, the members of the parlement of Paris, the garde des sceaux (keeper of the seals, de facto chancellor), the gentilhomme de la chambre du roi (gentleman of the king's chamber), the chevaliers of the Ordre de Saint-Michel (Order of Saint-Michel) and the Swiss guard followed. Behind them the king's parade horses, the grand écuyer Charny, the grand maître Guise and finally the king who proceeded into the city under a canopy held by four échevins (alderman) of Paris.

=== Massacre of St Bartholomew's Day ===
Charny was in the governate of Bourgogne during the St. Bartholomew's Day massacre in 1572. He ordered all the Protestants of Dijon present themselves before the hôtel de ville (town hall) the following day to present themselves to the magistrates. They were then moved to the keep of the château of Dijon for their protection.

According to a later account written by a councillor in the Dijon Parlement named Pierre Jeannin Charny received two nobles in the city from Paris who claimed to carry orders from the king ordering him to undertake a massacre of the local Protestant population in emulation of what was unfolding in Paris. Charny desired first to consider the matter and summoned Jeannin to a council to discuss how to proceed. Jeannin argued in favour of the 'law of Emperor Theodosius' by which to avoid executing the rash decision of an authority the provincial commander should wait thirty days and then approach the king to find out if it was truly his will. Charny therefore decided not to act on the letter given to him by the nobles, and undertook actions to prevent any disorders emerging in Dijon. This (1622 written) story of Jeannin's has been challenged by David El Kenz, who argues that no contemporary sources mention the arrival of nobles from Paris in Dijon or of Jeannin's supposed speech.

He soon received a letter from the king urging him to keep the peace and protect the Protestants. After a month the Protestants in the keep of the château were released, and they promised to live as good Catholics going forward.

== Reign of Henri III ==
=== Further advancement ===
Having returned from his kingship in the Polish-Lithuanian Commonwealth back to take the throne of France as Henri III, Henri changed the holders of many royal offices. While Charny was left as grand écuyer, his subordinate the premier écuyer was changed from the seigneur de Fontaines to the seigneur de Liancourt in 1578. Fontaines was compensated by being made lieutenant-general of Bretagne.

That same year, he became the sénéschal (seneschal) of Bourgogne and a conseiller d'État (councillor of state). He was also inducted as a chevalier of the Ordre du Saint-Esprit (Order of Saint-Esprit) however he was never received by the Ordre.

=== Competition for royal favour ===
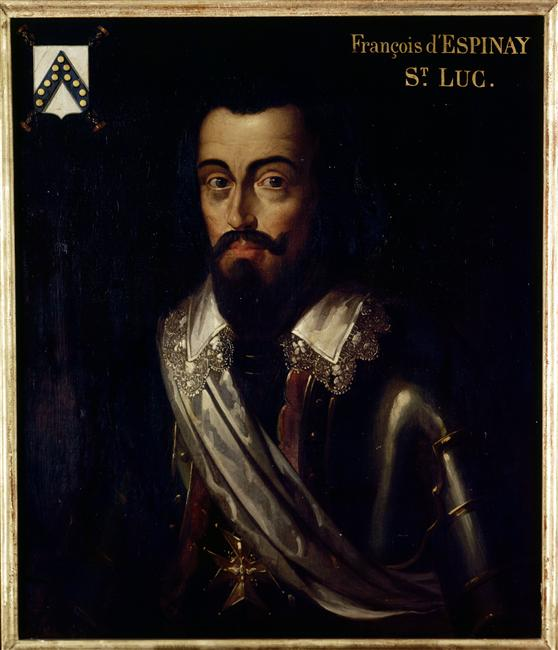
Saint-Luc, royal favourite, whose disgrace Charny would play a role in

Charny found himself involved in the alienation of the royal favourite Saint-Luc from the crown. As part of the agreement for the marriage between Saint-Luc and his wife Jeanne de Brissac, Henri had agreed that Saint-Luc would receive the office of grand écuyer from Charny. However, Charny refused to relinquish the office to him. Saint-Luc was then distraught to learn that Joyeuse, another royal favourite had seduced a daughter of Charny's (Marguerite de Chabot), and that Charny had indicated his willingness to hand over his charge if Joyeuse married the daughter. Even a year later, when the prospect of a marriage between Joyeuse and Marguerite was no longer going to happen rumours still swirled that Charny might provide the office to Joyeuse. Upon complaining to the king about the various slights he felt he was subject to (remarking 'What is the worth of raising men up only to cast them down?'), Henri told him the promise of the office of grand écuyer had only been presented to him to get him married, and that he should be content in the many other marks of royal favour that he enjoyed. In Le Roux's estimation this social competition was the key factor in Saint-Luc's disgrace.

When it came to assessing the threat to the king posed by the Lorraine princes, the secretary of state Villeroy gave the assessment in the spring of 1584 that Guise lacked much credit in his governate of Champagne, and while Mayenne had a little more strength in Bourgogne, Charny was a 'man of honour' who would not fall to any intrigues they might decide to undertake.

=== Crisis of the ligue ===
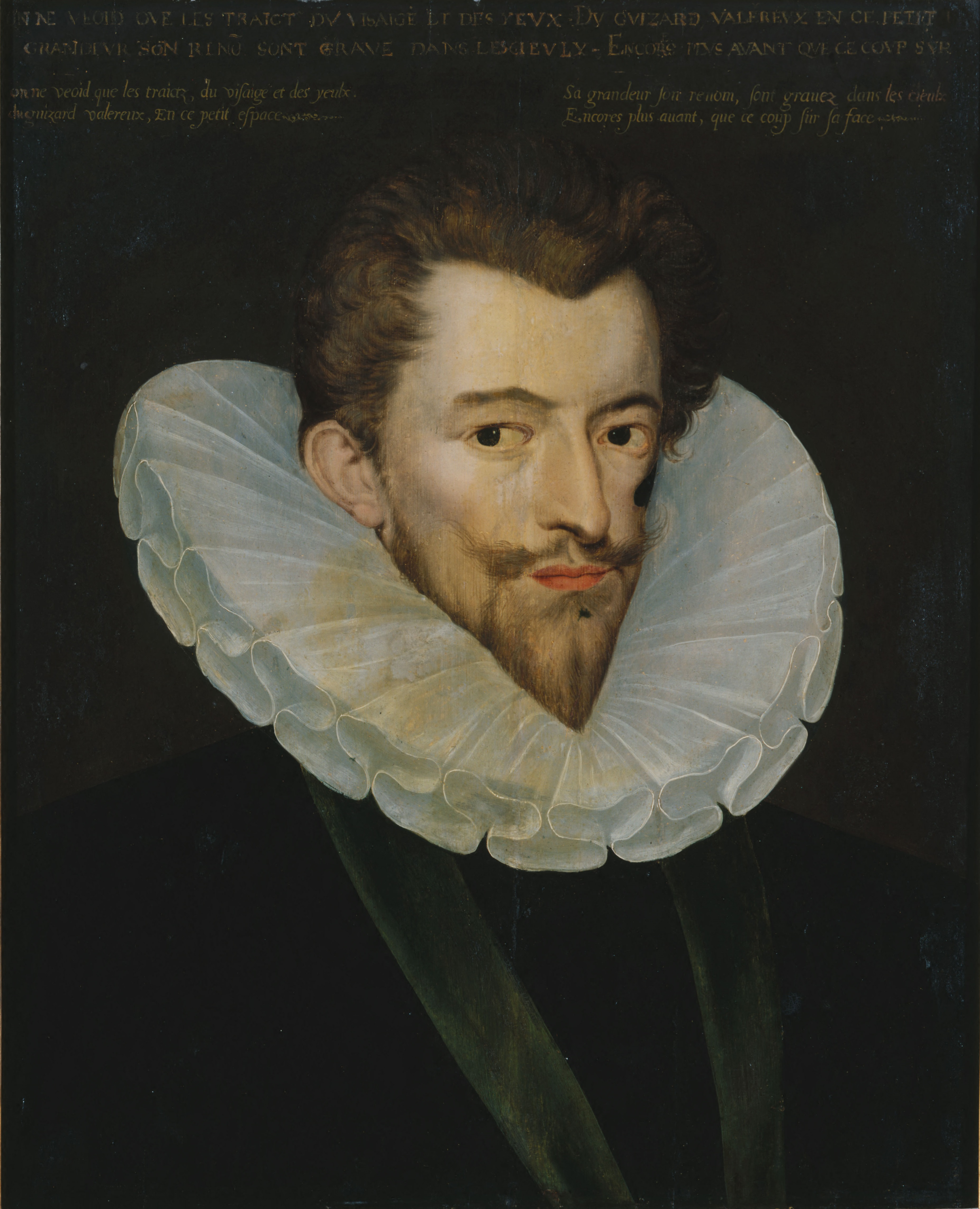
Duc de Guise who would found the second Catholic ligue in opposition to the succession of the king of Navarre

In June 1584 the king's brother, and heir to the throne Alençon died. Without a child of his own, the succession defaulted by the rules of Salic Law to the king's distant cousin, the Protestant king of Navarre. This was seized upon as unacceptable by a segment of the Catholic nobility, chief among them the duc de Guise. He oversaw the founding of a Catholic Ligue (League) in September, which vowed to oppose the succession of Navarre and combat various other disagreeable royal policies. In March 1585 the ligue entered war with the crown, and after a few months of conflict, succeeded in securing a favourable peace by which Henri capitulated to most of their demands in July.

=== Auxonne coup ===
In the Autumn of 1585, there were various attempts to establish Charny as the governor of Auxonne, which was presently governed by the ligueur (leaguer) Jean de Saulx, however nothing came of these, as the people of Auxonne resisted the attempts. Auxonne was a key frontier city, important in the defence of the kingdom from attempts by the Spanish or Germans to invade the kingdom. With nominal peace between the crown and the ligue the Protestants were re-arming in preparation for a new campaign against them, and therefore there were concerns that German reiters might try to invade the kingdom in their pay, accentuating Auxonne's importance.

After the overthrow of their governor, Jean de Saulx, by the people of Auxonne there was much concern in the city about the powerful interests they could upset by holding him captive. Among those who they feared to alienate was Charny, who as the father-in-law of Jean's elder brother was thought to be likely to be eternally resentful, and keen to subjugate the people of Auxonne in response. Despite this, the fortress of Saulx-le-Duc which had been seized by the rebels from the governor was handed over to Charny by the commander of the château d'Auxonne, the sieur de Pluvault.

Indeed, Charny's son-in-law actively campaigned for his brother's release, despite being of fundamentally royalist inclinations in contrast with the vicomtes ligueur disposition. He argued that the accusations of the inhabitants of Auxonne that Jean de Saulx had intended to sell out the city to the Spanish were false. Jean de Saulx also wrote daily to Charny to advocate for him at the court. Unlike Jean's brothers, Charny would not be an effective advocate, and instead of writing to the king to add to the petitions for the ligueur governors release, he wrote to the inhabitants of Auxonne to congratulate them. His letter to Auxonne was ultimately cautious in tone, careful not to directly attack Jean in its laudatory contents. At this point Charny was also unaware of the king's opinion on Auxonne's coup and therefore potentially risked taking a position adverse to that of the crown, as such he urged Auxonne to maintain the secrecy of his letter. In a post-script he added 'I beg that no one sees this letter'.

Despite this friendly tone, Charny was not trusted in Auxonne. They feared the possibility that the friendly tone was merely to put them at ease so that he might more easily re-establish Jean de Saulx in his charge. Far from being allowed to take charge of the château he was not even permitted to enter the city. During this time, the duc d'Elbeuf, a member of the Lorraine clan and great friend of the vicomte (viscount) stalked the region around Auxonne in force, causing much alarm in Auxonne that he intended to surprise the city. This alarmed not only Charny but also Henri, both of whom urged the inhabitants of Auxonne to be on their guard, until a new governor could be provided to the city. The vicomte thus turned to Mayenne and Guise to see to his release.

Around the same time as the Auxonne affair, similar developments contrary to the interest of the Guise and ligue were unfolding in Angers (where the comte de Brissac was deposed) and Mâcon. In all cases the deposed men were clients of the Lorraine princes. At Mâcon, the comte de Cruzille was surprised by the inhabitants of his city, with the château of Mâcon being demolished. In response to this Charny intervened more decisively, overseeing the freeing of Cruzille from the captivity in which he was held. However the king refused to expend effort to reinstall Cruzille, and therefore his involvement in the various depositions was suspected.

=== Temporary governor ===
Ultimately the king resolved on 7 November that Charny would take temporary command of Auxonne, until such time as Mayenne and Guise could propose a good man to replace the vicomte, who Henri felt needed to be tried by the parlement of Dijon. Henri wrote to the inhabitants of Auxonne, praising them as 'good and loyal subjects', he urged them however to preserve the château d'Auxonne until such time it could be received by Charny. Charny was commanded to head immediately to Auxonne to take command of the château and Jean de Saulx.

When it was learned in Auxonne that Charny was to take the governate of the city, there was protest that he was father-in-law to both the deposed vicomte and the duc d'Elbeuf, both of whom had troubled the city. If he was allowed in, he would surely revenge himself upon Auxonne for their treatment. Therefore, it was decided that his entry would be refused. These reservations about Charny were expressed in a letter to Henri.

They wrote a letter with different reasoning to Charny, arguing that they feared the prosecution of the vicomte would not succeed. Charny wrote back that they were wrong to doubt the commitment of the king to delivering justice as it was in his nature to provide justice to even the most alien person. The inhabitants of Auxonne were skilled at adapting their message to the audience, to the king they wrote of their fears of Charny, to Charny their fears of the king. Charny was not particularly fooled by the letter he received, and in his response, while maintaining his politeness implied he saw through their missive which he characterised as being designed to deny him entry without offending his personal honour. The king was informed of the refusal on 24 November by the representative he had sent.

Henri wrote back to Auxonne, reassuring them that Charny was as loyal as a servant of his could be, and he would not let any familial ties he had with the ousted vicomte override his duty to obey the kings will. Charny likewise continued to press Auxonne, though neither achieved success. A delegation was dispatched from Auxonne to explain their case to the king. Charny complained to the king about the intransigence of the city. By this time Guise and his brother were also beginning to feel aggrieved on the matter.

In December Henri requested that the vicomte be handed over to him, taking a middle ground that the disgraced ligueur would indeed be put on trial, thereby satisfying the inhabitants of Auxonne, but that the trial would not occur in Bourgogne (as his relatives feared), but rather in the royal council. He then on 18 December announced to Auxonne his intention to replace the vicomte, not with Charny but rather with the ligueur baron de Sennecey. Charny's role would now be to take the city from the inhabitants so that he could give it to Sennecey.

On 29 December Charny appeared before Auxonne with the intent to take command of the city for Sennecey. The city again refused the proposed transfer, having resolved with the sieur de Pluvault to not accept Sennecey. Charny was greatly frustrated by this new resistance from Auxonne, which was accompanied by military preparations to oppose the installation of Sennecey. In a letter to the crown, the people of Auxonne protested that they wished to serve the king and not the ligue, and therefore was distraught to be condemned to a ligueur governor like Sennecey. Pluvault protested his innocence in the decision of the city to Charny, but his protestations of innocence were ringing hollow by January. Henri, realising Charny was a poor choice to speak with Auxonne decided to treat with them directly through his own representative.

=== Siege of Auxonne ===
On 27 January the vicomte escaped from his captivity, a residence of Charny's. Charny argued subsequently that he was obliged to maintain his château 'open to anyone'. The bourgeois of Auxonne saw him as complicit in the events. Charny for his part was greatly embarrassed, and protested his innocence to the king in a letter. For his part, the vicomte denied Charny had played any part in his escape from his residence, arguing Charny could not overlook his ligueur inclinations and past actions. Charny had always maintained 20 men in guard of him, according to the vicomte. Now free the vicomte looked to Mayenne and Guise to advance his cause.

Henri resolved to reduce Auxonne to accepting Sennecey by force. Charny was dispatched to give the inhabitants their final alternative offer in May. He travelled with 30 horse to Auxonne, where he was refused entry and travelled a little further. He left behind the baron de Lux who at first delivered a stern lecture, warning them that if they did not admit Charny, the king would declare them all rebels guilty of lèse majesté. However, Lux added to this that it was in fact the king's (more secret) desire to see this affair dragged out as long as possible. Lux even suggested they increase the size of their garrison to better withstand a siege.

The advice was already being taken to heart in Auxonne. Back in April Charny had been warned by those in Dijon that Auxonne was recruiting soldiers from Dijon and trying to steal weapons for Auxonne. The campaign was effective and the garrison increased substantially during this period, works were also undertaken to improve the fortifications. In June Charny and Guise began to clamp down on the flow of men into Auxonne. Charny continued negotiations with Auxonne throughout this period, much to the suspicion of Sennecey, who was convinced Charny intended to put himself or his brother the sieur de Brion in charge of the city. Sennecey therefore urged Guise to hurry up and begin a siege of the city.

On 17 July Guise's lieutenants (Saint-Paul, de Rosne, and the vicomte) attempted to invest the city. There forces were however insufficient and therefore they blocked the roads as best as they could. Guise lacked resources, and sent Sennecey to court to beg for royal support in the siege while he attempted to acquire supplies from the duc de Lorraine.

Henri decided against providing more resources to Charny in favour of the Guise led siege. Charny was nevertheless commissioned on 25 July to put Auxonne to siege, though without any augmentation to his force. He had at his command around 3000 mercenary landsknechts which in combination with the forces of Elbeuf, and those already arrayed around Auxonne may have been sufficient to compel the submission of Auxonne. Henri had not provided him pay for the landsknechts which complicated their use in any operations, as an entirely foreign mercenary force both he and the vicomte de Tavannes also had concerns about their reliability.

Beyond this, Charny also lacked much in the way of artillery, officers to set up batteries, pioneers or engineer companies that might be necessary for the reduction of the city. With the king not providing him much, he pessimistically looked to the Estates of Bourgogne for support, first in the provision of food to his men, he did not have much hope in their coming through however. Faced with these issues, Charny wrote to the king to allow him to not involve himself in the siege, and wrote to Sennecey apologetically that he did not have the means to support the reduction of the city.

The city would ultimately not fall to a siege from either Charny or the forces of Guise's clients. Rather on 10 August negotiations were opened by the parlementaire Pierre Jeannin for the cities composition. Mayenne had tasked Jeannin with ensuring the city was brought into obedience without an assault that could damage the value of the province and put his brother Guise in the driver seat for the post-conquest settlement. Charny would be one of the parties to the treaty that was established on 15 August, alongside Guise, de Rosne and various others. Pluvault was bought off with a large sum of money and the abbey of Vézelay which was to be granted to one of his sons. The citizens of Auxonne meanwhile received compensation for damages received during the months of troubles and were exempted from tax for nine years.

After this Sennecey was introduced into the city by Charny and took the oath of governor. Guise was careful not to overplay his victory, and stayed only briefly in Auxonne without the presence of Charny. The ligueur vicomte was left to bitterly note that neither his uncle-in-law Charny nor his patron Guise had protected his interests.

=== Discord with the ligue ===
In 1586, with relations between the ligue and crown increasingly fraught, Henri looked to his lieutenant-generals Dinteville (in Champagne) and Charny in Bourgogne to both combat the disorders and to act as a counterweight in their respective governates to the influence of the Lorraine family. Champagne and Bourgogne were the two governments in the kingdom held by the Lorraine family.

In January 1588, Henri explained to Charny that the development of new disorders in the kingdom had forced him to cut his expenses so he could better focus on ameliorating the issues.

=== Decline of authority ===
At the start of 1589, Charny was finally divested of his office of grand écuyer, selling it to the newly ascendant royal favourite the baron de Termes for a sum of 210,000 livres. Termes also acquired the office of premier gentilhomme de la chambre du roi (first gentleman of the king's chamber) at this time from the duc d'Épernon.

Charny was replaced at this time as lieutenant-general of Bourgogne by the lieutenant-general of the ligue, Mayenne. Mayenne did not feel he could trust Charny and therefore selected one of his clients to replace him the sieur de Fervaques, hoping by this means to cement his control of the province of which he was governor. Mayenne had first nominated Fervaques so that Henri could have Charny replaced in late 1588, before the assassination of the duc de Guise, however after this murder by the king began a new civil war between the crown and the ligue, he unilaterally deposed Charny and appointed Fervaques on his own authority.

== Reign of Henri IV ==
=== Death ===
Charny died in August 1597, without a male heir to succeed him to his titles. His testament was executed by his nephew the marquis de Mirebeau. His lands were divided between his five surviving daughters.

== Sources ==
- Carroll, Stuart (2005). Noble Power During the French Wars of Religion: The Guise Affinity and the Catholic Cause in Normandy. Cambridge University Press.
- Carroll, Stuart (2011). Martyrs and Murderers: The Guise Family and the Making of Europe. Oxford University Press.
- Chaix d'Est-Ange, Gustave (1910). Dictionnaire des familles françaises anciennes ou notables à la fin du XIXe siècle. IX. Cas-Cha. impr. de C. Hérissey.
- Chevallier, Pierre (1985). Henri III: Roi Shakespearien. Fayard.
- Constant, Jean-Marie (1984). Les Guise. Hachette.
- Constant, Jean-Marie (1996). La Ligue. Fayard.
- Harding, Robert (1978). Anatomy of a Power Elite: the Provincial Governors in Early Modern France. Yale University Press.
- Henri (1863). "Heri III, Instituteur de l'Ordre et premier chef souverain". Annuaire-Bulletin de la Société de l'histoire de France. 1 2.
- Holt, Mack P. (2005). The French Wars of Religion, 1562-1629. Cambridge University Press.
- Holt, Mack P. (2020). The Politics of Wine in Early Modern France: Religion and Popular Culture in Burgundy, 1477-1630. Cambridge University Press.
- Jouanna, Arlette (2015). The St Bartholomew's Day Massacre: The Mysteries of a Crime of State. Manchester University Press.
- Knecht, Robert (2010). The French Wars of Religion, 1559-1598. Routledge.
- Knecht, Robert (2016). Hero or Tyrant? Henry III, King of France, 1574-1589. Routledge.
- Le Person, Xavier (2002). «Practiques» et «practiqueurs»: la vie politique à la fin du règne de Henri III (1584-1589). Librairie Droz.
- Le Roux, Nicolas (2000). La Faveur du Roi: Mignons et Courtisans au Temps des Derniers Valois. Champ Vallon.
- Le Roux, Nicolas (2020). Portraits d'un Royaume: Henri III, la Noblesse et la Ligue. Passés Composés.
- Le Roux, Nicolas (2022). 1559-1629 Les Guerres de Religion. Gallimard.
- Sainte-Marthe, Scevole (1628). Histoire généalogique de la maison de France : Rev. et augm. en cette édition des deux précédentes maisons royales, vol. 2. Buon.
- Sandret, Louis (1886). Histoire généalogique de la maison de Chabot. Impr. de V. Forest et E. Grimaud.
