= Alexandra Martin (born 1976) =

French politician

Member of the National Assembly for Gironde's 1st constituency
- Incumbent
- Assumed office 27 April 2026
- Preceded by: Thomas Cazenave
- Succeeded by: Thomas Cazenave
- In office 21 August 2023 – 9 June 2024
- Preceded by: Thomas Cazenave
- Succeeded by: Thomas Cazenave

Personal details
- Born: 28 July 1976 (age 49) Bordeaux, France
- Party: La République En Marche!

Alexandra Martin (born 28 July 1976) is a French politician from La République En Marche! who has represented Gironde's 1st constituency in the National Assembly from 2023 to 2024, and again since 2026.

== Political career ==
In the 2022 election, Martin was the substitute candidate for Thomas Cazenave, and took his seat when he was appointed to the Borne government.

In the run-up to the 2022 Republican leadership election, Martin endorsed Éric Ciotti as the party's chairman. In the Republicans' 2025 leadership election, she later endorsed Bruno Retailleau to succeed Ciotti as the party's new chair.

== See also ==
- List of deputies of the 16th National Assembly of France
- List of deputies of the 17th National Assembly of France
