= Philippe Chabot =

French admiral (c. 1492 – 1543)

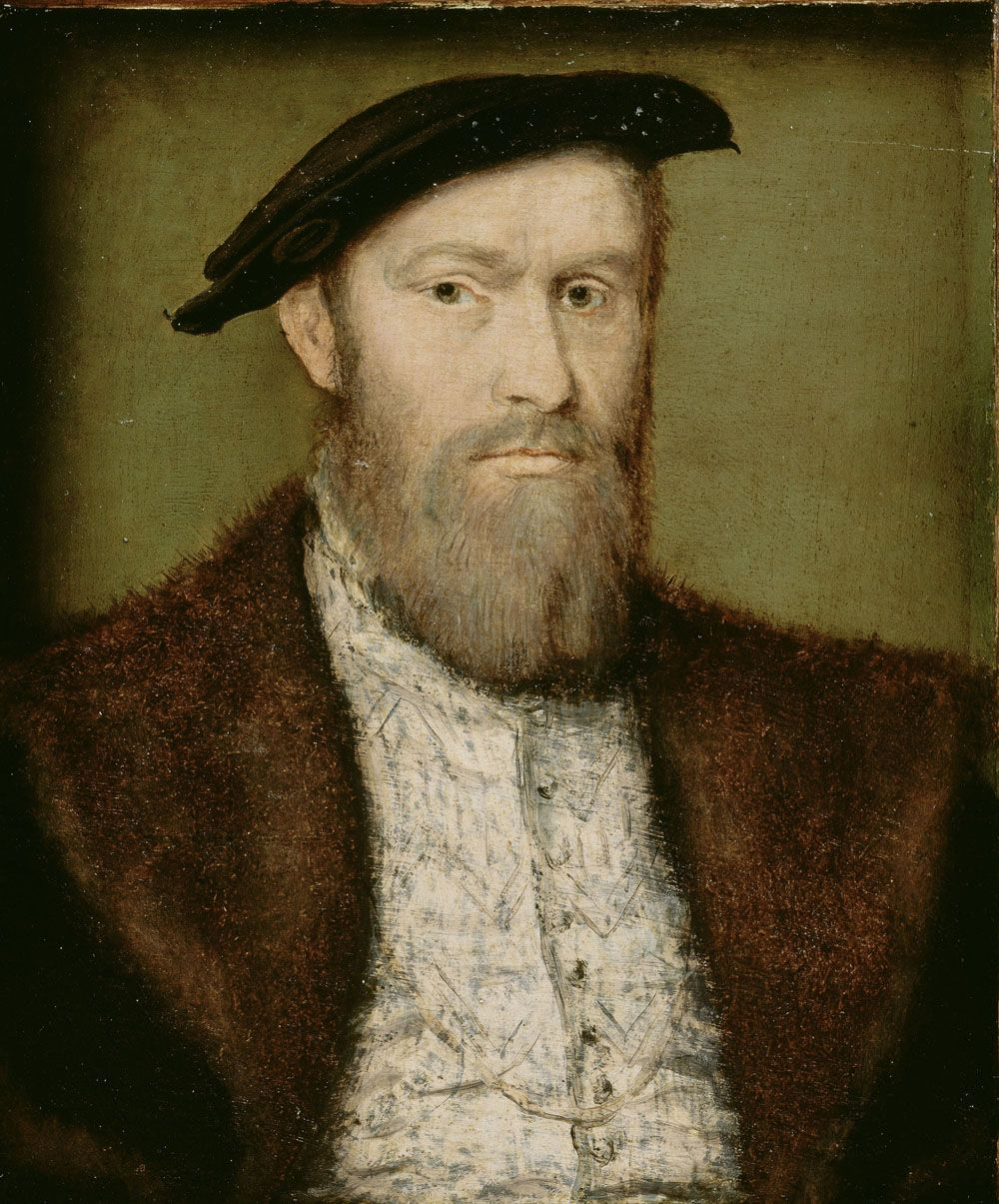

Admiral of France

Governor of Burgundy
- In office 1526

French ambassador to England
- In office 1533, 1534

Personal details
- Born: c. 1492
- Died: 1 June 1543
- Spouse: Françoise de Longwy

Philippe Chabot, Seigneur De Brion, Count of Charny and Buzançois (English: /ʃæˈboʊ/ sha-BOH, French: [filip ʃabo]; c. 1492 – 1 June 1543), also known as Admiral De Brion, was an admiral of France.

== Biography ==
The Chabot family was one of the oldest and most powerful in Poitou. Philippe was a cadet of the Jarnac branch. He was a companion of Francis I as a child, and on that king's accession was loaded with honors and estates. After the battle of Pavia he was made Admiral of France and governor of Burgundy (1526), and shared with Anne de Montmorency the direction of affairs. He served as ambassador to England in 1533 and 1534.

He was at the height of his power in 1535, and commanded the army for the invasion of the states of the duke of Savoy; but in the campaigns of 1536 and 1537 he was eclipsed by Montmorency, and from that moment his influence began to wane. He was accused by his enemies of peculation, and condemned on 10 February 1541 to a fine of 1,500,000 livres, to banishment, and to the confiscation of his estates. Through the good offices of the king's mistress Madame d'Étampes, however, he obtained the king's pardon almost immediately (March 1541), was reinstated in his posts, and regained his estates and even his influence, while Montmorency in his turn was disgraced. But his health was affected by these troubles, and he died soon afterwards on 1 June 1543.

His tomb, removed to the Louvre, thought to be by Jean Cousin the Elder, is a fine example of French Renaissance work. It was his nephew, Jarnac, who fought the famous duel with François de Vivonne, seigneur de la Châtaigneraie, in 1547, at the beginning of the reign of Henry II.

Chabot was instrumental in arranging the voyages of Giovanni da Verrazzano and Jacques Cartier.

== Marriage and children ==
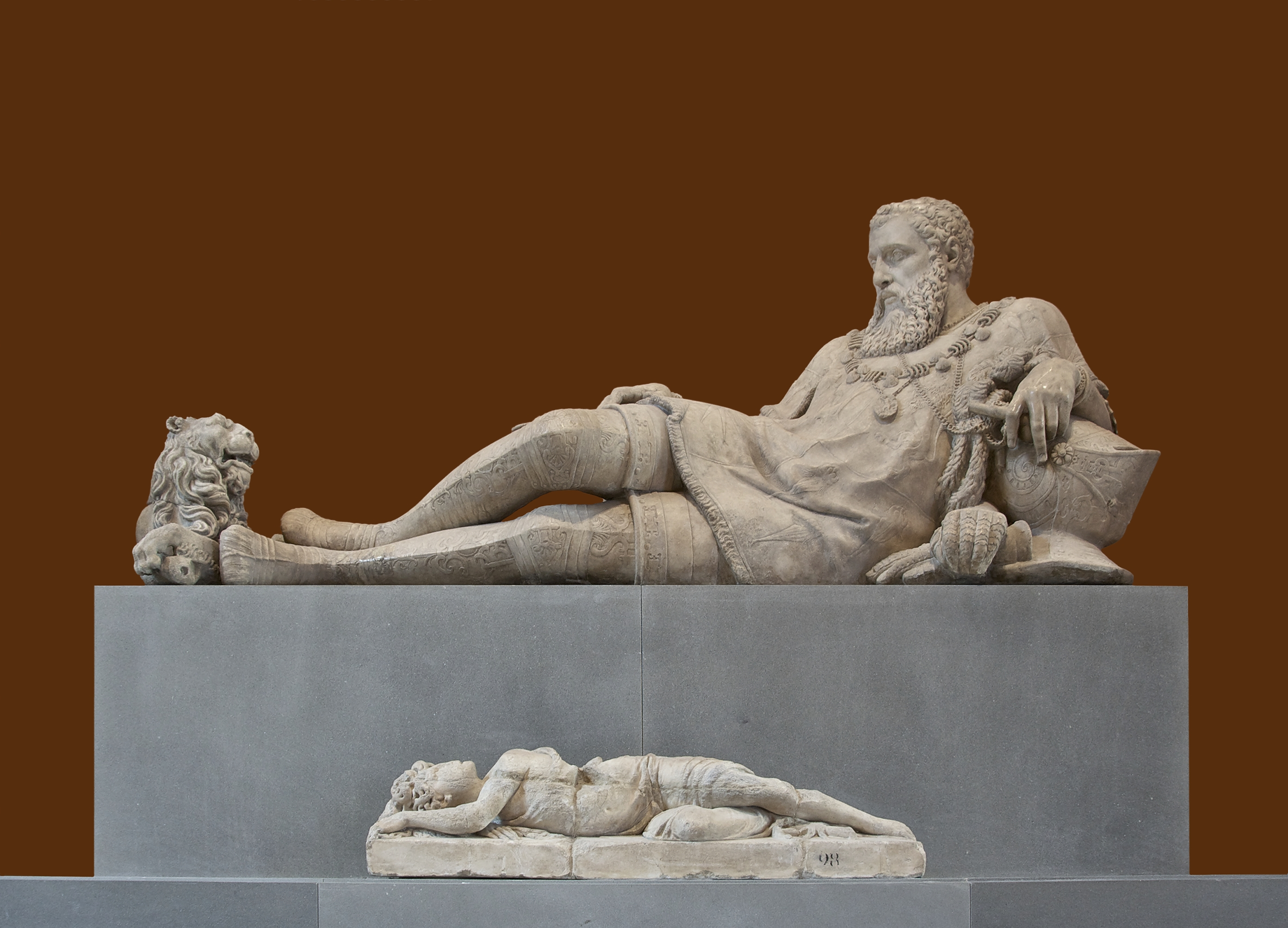
Elements of his tomb, Louvre museum, Paris.

On 10 January 1526, Chabot married Françoise de Longwy, Dame de Pagny and de Mirebeau (c.1510- after 14 April 1561), the eldest daughter of Jean IV de Longwy, Seigneur de Givry, Baron of Pagny and of Mirebeau (died 1520), and Jeanne of Angoulême, Countess of Bar-sur-Seine, the illegitimate half-sister of King Francis. They had six children:

- Léonor Chabot, Count of Charny (1526–1597), married firstly Claude Gouffier, by whom he had two daughters; and secondly Françoise de Longwy-Rye, Dame de Longwy, by whom he had another four daughters, including Marguerite de Chabot, Countess of Charny (1565- 29 September 1652), who married Charles I of Lorraine (province), the Duke of Elbeuf.
- François Chabot, Marquis of Mirebeau, married firstly, Françoise, Dame de Lugny, by whom he had one daughter; and secondly on 25 December 1565, Catherine de Silly, by whom he had seven children.
- Françoise Chabot de Charny, married Charles de La Rochefoucard, Seigneur de Barbesieux, by whom she had three daughters.
- Antoinette Chabot de Charny, married Jean VI d'Aumont, Count of Chateauroux, by whom she had one son.
- Anne Chabot de Charny, married Karl van Halewijn, Marquis of Maignelais, by whom she had one daughter.
- Jeanne Chabot de Charny, Abbess of Porcelet (died 1593)

== Sources ==
The main authorities for Chabot's life are his manuscript correspondence in the Bibliothèque Nationale, Paris, and contemporary memoirs. See also E. de Barthlemy, Chabot de Brion, in the Revue des questions historiques (page 168, vol. xx. July 1876); Martineau, L'Amiral Chabot, in the Positions des l'hses de l'Ecole des Chartes (1883).

== Fictional portrayals ==
His conflict with Montmorency is depicted in a 17th-century play by George Chapman and James Shirley entitled The Tragedy of Chabot, Admiral of France (1639).

A fictionalised version of Chabot appears in the 2007 Showtime series The Tudors, played by French actor Philippe De Grossouvre. This is in season 2, episode 6.
