= Gadifer Shorthose =

Gadifer Shorthose (French: Gadifier Shartoise) was the English mayor of Bordeaux from 1434 until 1451. He was a weak leader and the city passed out of English lordship and into France during his mayorship.

In 1442, Shorthose refused to comply with the orders of the regent of Gascony, Robert Roos. On 1 November 1450, Arnaud Amanieu d'Albret approached Bordeaux with an army of 500. Shorthose—leading a hodge-podge force of English men-at-arms, Gascon knights, and municipal militia—sallied forth to the challenge. The lack of leadership and organisation doomed the Bordelais expedition and Amaneiu routed the defenders. The day became known as La Male Journade because of the immense loss of life suffered by the citizens of Bordeaux.

In 1451, the French general Jean de Dunois broke through the walls of the city and the garrison retreated to the castle, where Shorthose and the other commanders commanded a small group of twenty five men-at-arms, because, out of greed it is said, they had been given funds for eighty but decided to hire less and divert what money remained. On May 23, the castle fell. Shorthose was the last mayor of English Bordeaux until John Talbot liberated the city the following year.

== Sources ==
- Labarge, Margaret Wade. Gascony, England's First Colony 1204–1453. London: Hamish Hamilton, 1980.
