= Nicolas Florian =

French politician (1969–2025)

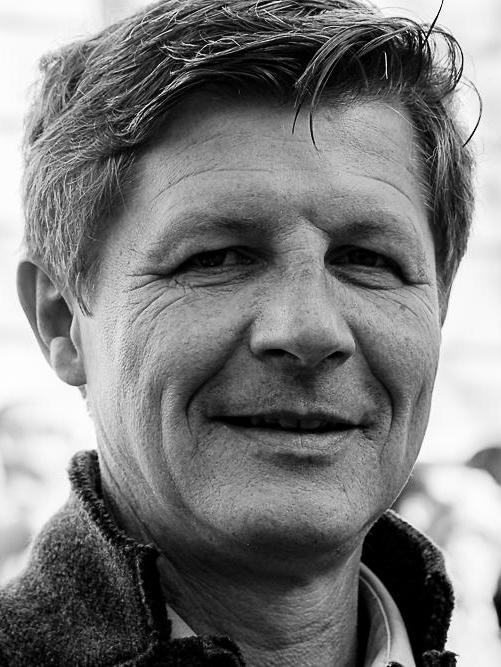
- Florian in 2019

Mayor of Bordeaux
- In office 7 March 2019 – 3 July 2020
- Preceded by: Alain Juppé
- Succeeded by: Pierre Hurmic

Personal details
- Born: 29 March 1969 Marmande, France
- Died: 26 January 2025 (aged 55) Bordeaux, France
- Party: The Republicans

Nicolas Florian (29 March 1969 – 26 January 2025) was a French politician who was the mayor of Bordeaux from 2019 to 2020. He was a member of The Republicans.

Florian died from complications from a stroke in Bordeaux on 26 January 2025, at the age of 55.

== See also ==
- List of mayors of Bordeaux
