= Siege of Bordeaux (1453) =

1453 battle that ended the Hundred Years' War

- Part of the Hundred Years' War
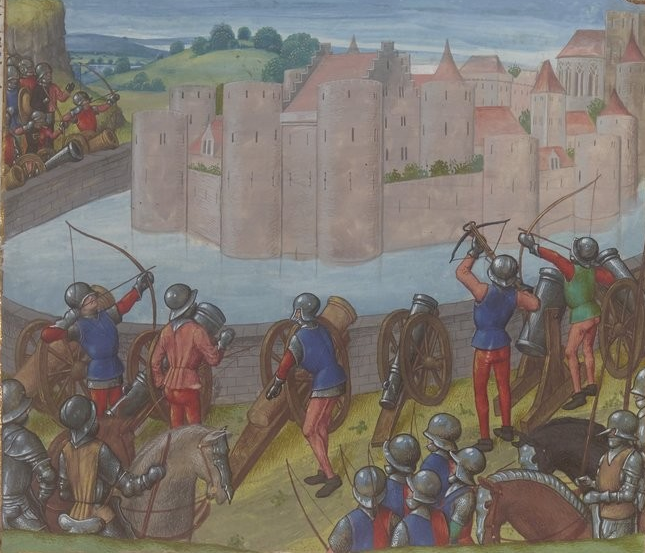
- The royal artillery at work at the siege of Bordeaux. Illumination from the Recueil des Croniques et Anchiennes Istories de la Grant Bretaigne, à présent nommé Engleterre by Jean de Wavrin, BNF
Date	13 August – 19 October 1453
Location	Bordeaux
Result	French victory: End of Hundred Years' War

Belligerents
Kingdom of France	Kingdom of England

Commanders and leaders
Charles VII of France; Jean Bureau	Pierre de Montferrand; Gaillard IV de Durfort

The siege of Bordeaux by King Charles VII, between August and October 1453, is part of the third phase of the Hundred Years' War. It marks the attachment of the city to the crown of France and the end of the English presence in Guyenne as well as in France and of the Hundred Years' War.

== Background ==
On June 29, 1451, the city of Bordeaux surrendered to the troops of Charles VII but it was recaptured a year later by Lord Talbot. On July 17, 1453, the French won the battle of Castillon, which opened the road to Bordeaux for them. The fall of Castillon led to that of the surrounding towns: Saint-Émilion, Libourne, Fronsac, Bourg, Blaye. Bordeaux thus finds itself surrounded.

== Operation ==
On August 13, 1453, the King of France, Charles VII, arrived in person at the Château de Montferrand on the Ambès peninsula to direct the siege operations. The fleet was placed under the command of Jean de Bueil, admiral of France. Charles VII had defense works built to protect his army in the open countryside, in particular near Lormont. The city of Bordeaux was protected by three walls and around twenty large towers; 8,000 men ensured its defense, they resisted for two months.

The fall of Cadillac and then of the Château de Blanquefort in September diminished the hopes of the people of Bordeaux; moreover, the rich merchants feared seeing their hotels destroyed by Jean Bureau's artillery. Charles VII received reinforcements from fifteen Burgundian ships, sent by Philip the Good. The plague having reached the king's army, the latter agreed to show clemency towards the defenders of Bordeaux, in order to conclude the negotiations promptly; moreover, the supply of the French armies was hampered by the Gascons who led a scorched earth policy.

A treaty was signed on October 9 between the king and nine Bordeaux notables in Montferrand; it provides for the payment of 100,000 crowns by the city of Bordeaux and the release of French prisoners without ransom. Twenty people from Bordeaux, designated by the king, suffered the penalty of banishment, including the lord of Landiras and that of Duras. On October 12, the Bordeaux people delivered twelve hostages, six English and six Gascons, as guarantee. The English left the city with the honors of war, the troops of Charles VII entered there on October 19.

== Consequences ==
The king did not deign to enter Bordeaux, he promised to leave the administration of the city to the people of Bordeaux but in reality he reserved the choice of the mayor, five jurats and the city clerk. A tax was applied to the export of wine, at a rate of 25 cents per barrel. The capture of the city by the French and the loss of its privileges led to the emigration of many nobles and bourgeois to England.
