= Françoise de Longwy =

Dame of Pagny and Mirebeau (1510–1561)

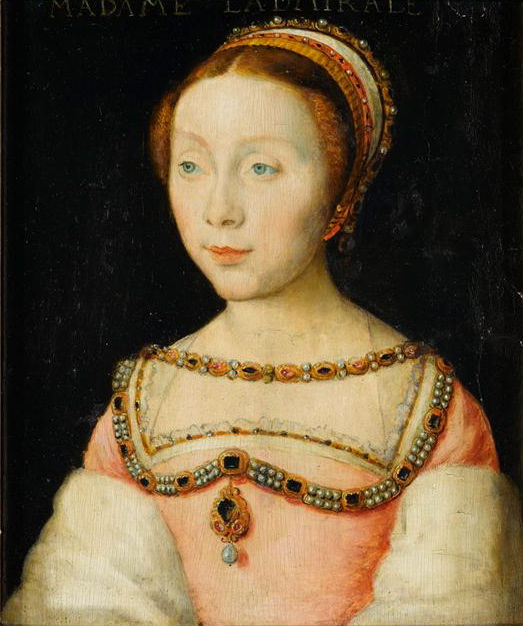
- Portrait by Corneille de Lyon, 1536
- Full name: Françoise de Longwy
- Born: 1510
- Died: 28 August 1561 (aged 50–51)
- Spouse: Philippe Chabot (m. 1526; died 1543) Jacques de Pérusse des Cars (m. 1544)
- Issue: François Chabot; Léonor Chabot; Françoise Chabot; Antoinette Chabot; Anne Chabot; Anne d'Escars de Givry
- Father: Jean IV de Longwy
- Mother: Jeanne d'Angoulême

Françoise de Longwy (French pronunciation: [fʁɑ̃swaz də lɔ̃wi]; 1510 – 28 August 1561) was the first-born and eldest daughter of Jean IV de Longwy and his wife, Jeanne d'Angoulême. After the death of her father, as eldest, she inherited the title of Dame of Pagny and Mirebeau. On 10 January 1526, Françoise wed Philippe Chabot, thereby through marriage, succeeded to the Countess of Charny and Buzançois. At court she held the position of lady-in-waiting to Catherine de Medici, and for Eleanor of Austria between 1532 and 1543.

== Early life ==
Born in 1510, Françoise was the daughter of Jean IV of Longwy and Jeanne d'Angoulême, the illegitimate daughter of Charles, Count of Angoulême. Françoise's mother was the half-sister of Francis I of France.

On 10 January 1526, at the age of 16, Françoise married Philippe Chabot, Seigneur De Brion, Count of Charny and Buzançois, present at the marriage was the court of King Francis. In 1532, Françoise was appointed as Dame d'Honneur to Queen Eleanor of Austria, her time as Dame d'Honneur came to an end in 1543 and in 1560, she served as Dame d'Honneur to Queen Catherine de Medici.

== Ancestry ==
Ancestors of Françoise de Longwy

16. Mathieu II de Longvy
8. Jean III de Longvy
17. Bonné de La Trémouille
4. Philippe de Longvy
18. Jean de Vienne
9. Jeanne de Vienne
19. Henriette de Grandson
2. Jean IV de Longwy
20. Henri de Bauffremont
10. Pierre de Bauffremont
21. Jeanne de Vergy
5. Jeanne de Bauffremont
22. Philip the Good
11. Mary of Burgundy
23. Jeanne Colette Catelaine
1. Françoise de Longwy
24. Alain IX de Rohan
12. Marguerite of Rohan
25. Marguerite de Bretagne de Montfort
6. Charles, Count of Angoulême
26. Louis I, Duke of Orléans
13. John, Count of Angoulême
27. Valentina Visconti, Duchess of Orléans
3. Jeanne d'Angoulême
28. Achard II de Polignac
14. Foucauld de Polignac
29. Marguerite Sequin
7. Jeanne de Polignac
30. Jean de Chabannais
15. Agnes de Chabanais
31. Marguerite Chauvet

== Sources ==
- Potter, David (2004). Foreign Intelligence and Information in the Elizabethan England:Two English Treatises on the State of France, 1580-1584. Cambridge University Press.
