= Pierre II de Montferrand =

15th century French nobleman

Coat of arms of Pierre II de Montferrand

Pierre II de Montferrand (died July 1454), lord of Landiras, was a French knight who served the English during the Hundred Years' War. He was the governor of Blaye and was executed on 31 July 1454, due to the years-long aftermath of the Battle of Castillon.

== Biography ==
Pierre was a son of Bertrand III de Montferrand and Isabelle de Preissac, dame of Landiras. Landiras is about 50 kilometers south-southeast from Saint-Louis-de-Montferrand. He married Mary of Bedford, illegitimate daughter of John of Lancaster, Duke of Bedford. Mary was a granddaughter of Henry IV of England. Pierre received 500 pounds worth of French coinage (livre tournois) and land from the Duke of Bedford as a dowry. After being executed in 1454, he was succeeded by his son François.
