= Water mirror =

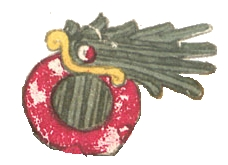
"Water mirror" glyph used in Aztec script

Water mirror may refer to:

- Water-based specular reflection
  - Reflecting pool, a shallow pool of water with a reflective surface, undisturbed by fountain jets
    - Miroir d'eau, a reflecting pool in Bordeaux, France
- Sima Hui (died 208), Chinese hermit and teacher
