= Port of Bordeaux =

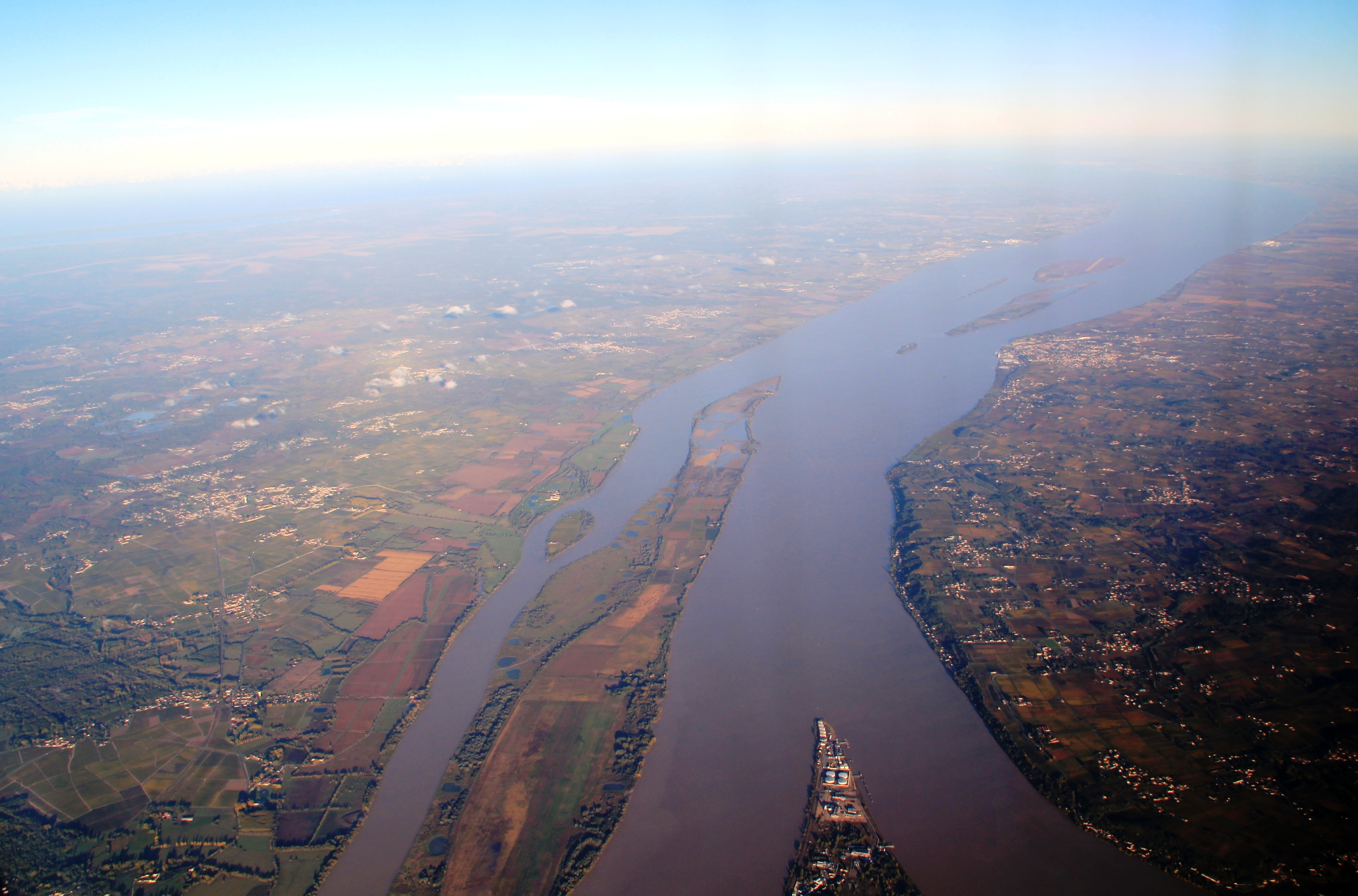
- Aerial view of the Gironde estuary with Bec d'Ambes refinery facilities bottom centre

- Location in France
- Native name: Grand Port Maritime de Bordeaux

Location
- Country: France
- Location: Gironde Estuary
- Coordinates: 44°54′N 0°32′W
- UN/LOCODE: FRBOD

Details
- No. of berths: 28
- Draft depth: 11.0 metres (36.1 ft)

Statistics
- Website; Official website

The Port of Bordeaux is a port facility and Grand port maritime located on France's Atlantic coast, on the Gironde Estuary. The port area stretches from the mouth of the Gironde to the city of Bordeaux, 100 km. SE.

A multipurpose port, Bordeaux handles cruise traffic, breakbulk, dry bulk and containers, as well as liquid bulk facilities at Pauillac and Bec d'Ambes.

The Port de la Lune is the ancient city port.
