= Reflecting pool =

Type of water feature

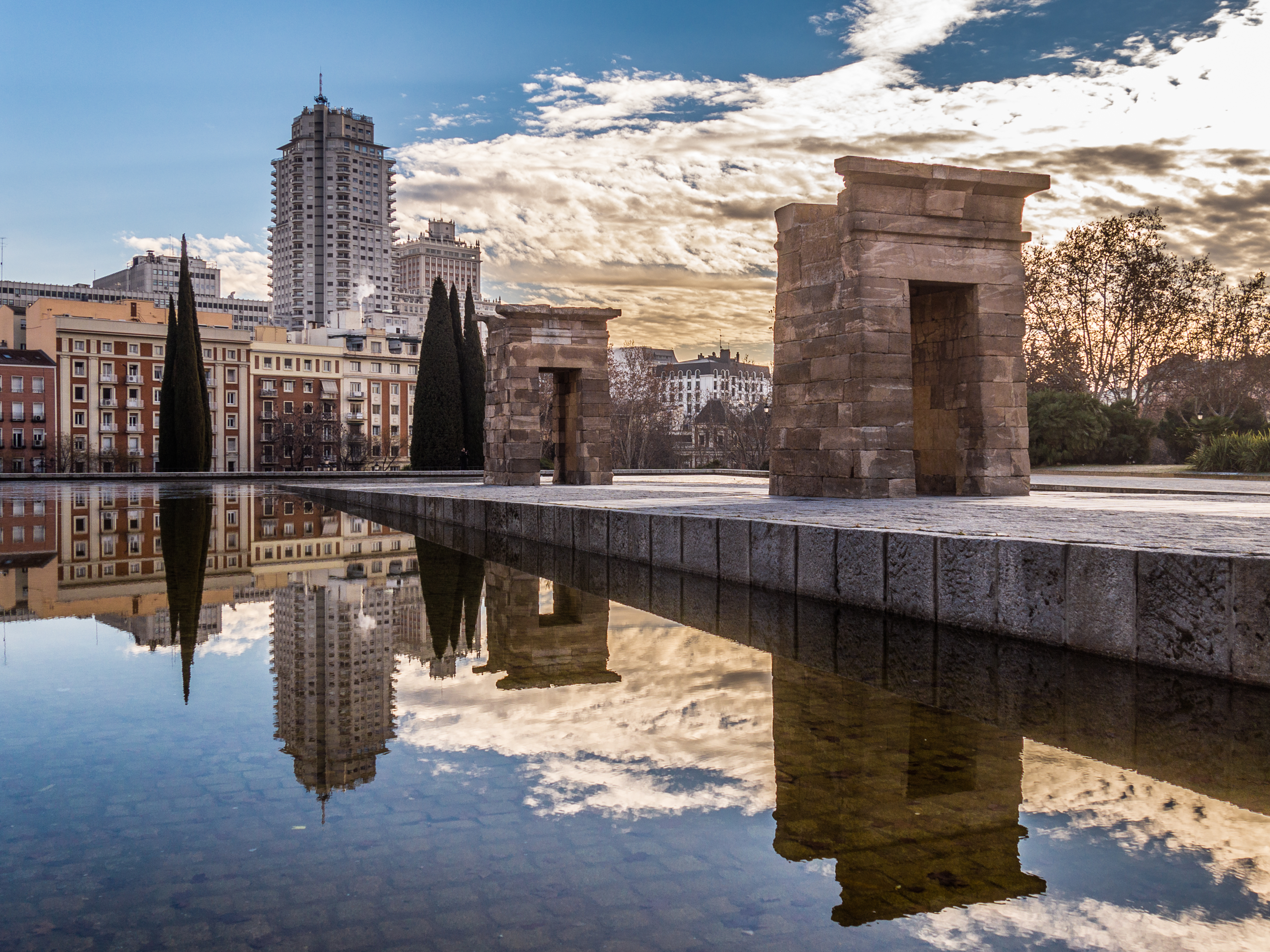
Temple of Debod (Madrid, Spain) in the reflecting pool of the garden of the Parque del Oeste

A reflecting pool, also called a reflection pool, is a water feature found in gardens, parks and memorial sites. It usually consists of a shallow pool of water with a reflective surface, undisturbed by fountain jets.

== Design ==
Reflecting pools are often designed with the outer basin floor at the rim slightly deeper than the central area to suppress wave formation. They can be as small as a bird bath to as large as a major civic element. Their origins are from ancient Persian gardens.

== List of notable reflecting pools ==
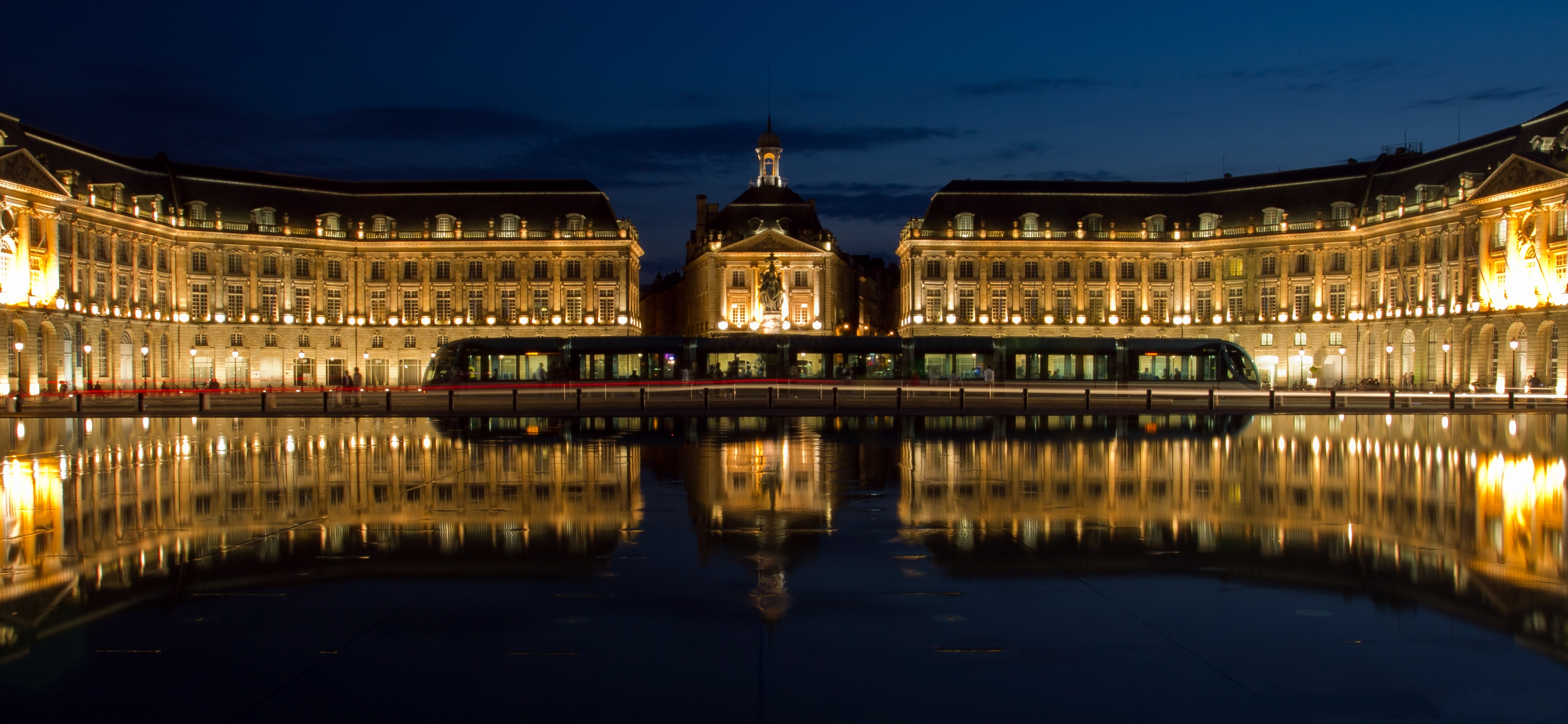
The Miroir d'eau by night in Bordeaux, France

- The Miroir d'eau (Water mirror) on Place de la Bourse in Bordeaux, France.
- The Mughal garden reflecting pools at the Taj Mahal in Agra, India
- Chehel Sotoun in Iran
- The Lincoln Memorial Reflecting Pool and Capitol Reflecting Pool, in Washington, D.C.
- Mary Gibbs and Jesse H. Jones Reflection Pool, Hermann Park, Houston, Texas, U.S.
- The modernist Palácio do Planalto and Palácio da Alvorada in Brasília, Brazil
- Martin Luther King Jr. National Historical Park in Atlanta, Georgia
- The Oklahoma City National Memorial, at the site of the Oklahoma City bombing
- The Hollywood Bowl in Los Angeles, California, where a former reflecting pool was located in front of the stage, c. 1953 – 1972
- The National September 11 Memorial & Museum, located at the World Trade Center site in New York City, with two reflecting pools on the location where the Twin Towers stood

== Gallery ==
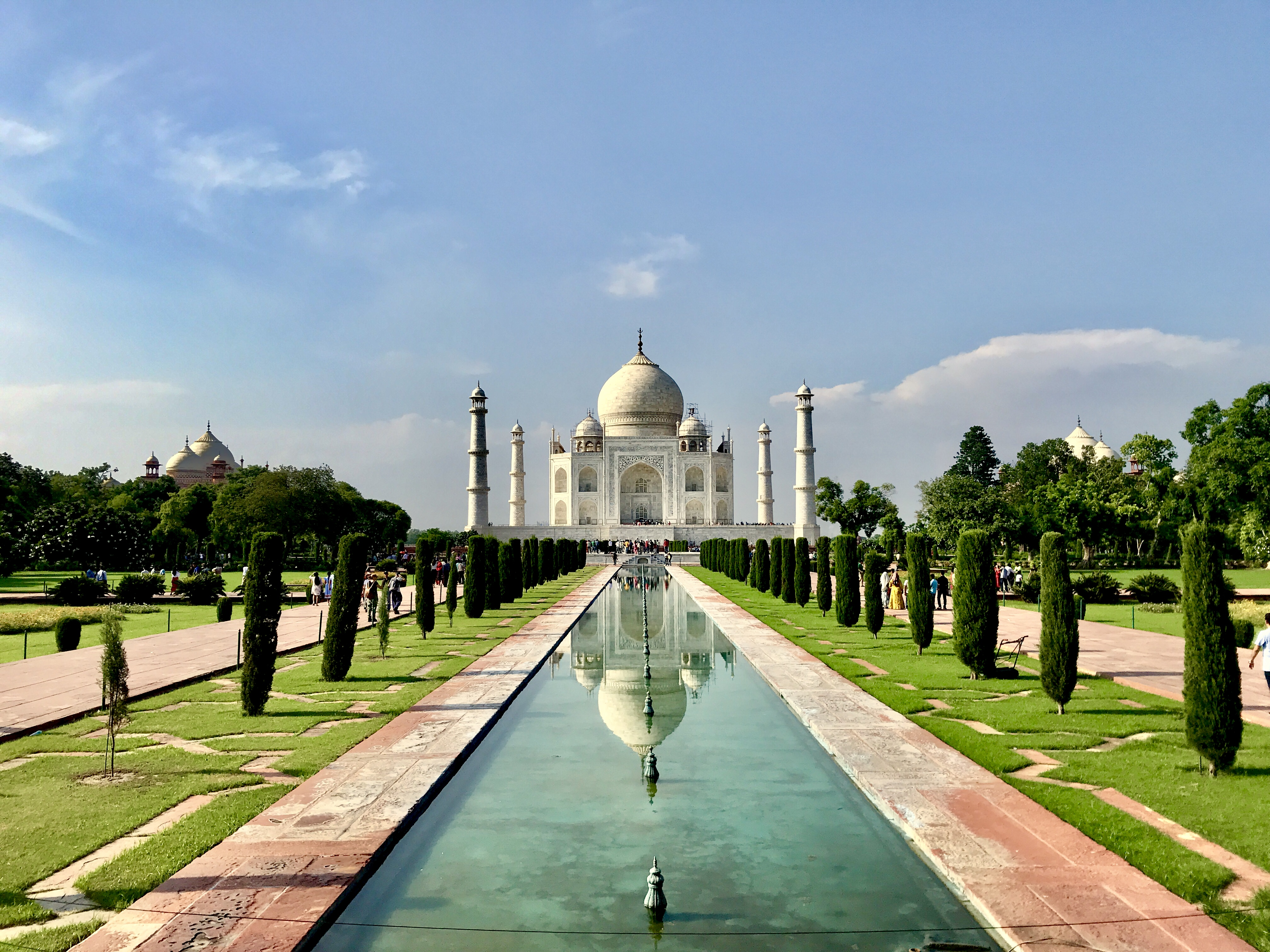
The reflecting pool of the Taj Mahal

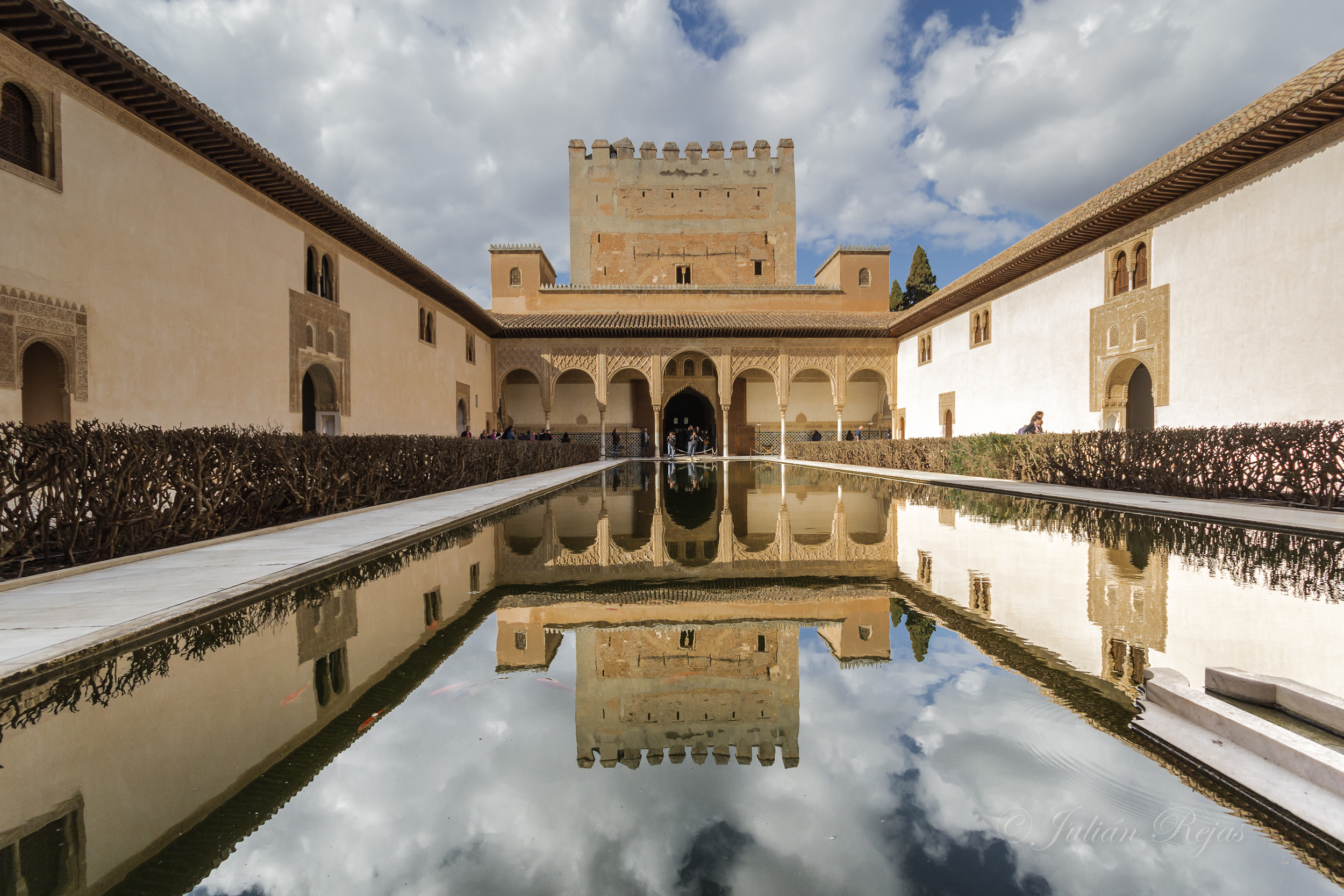
The reflecting pool in the Patio de los Arrayanes, at the Moorish Alhambra of Granada, Spain

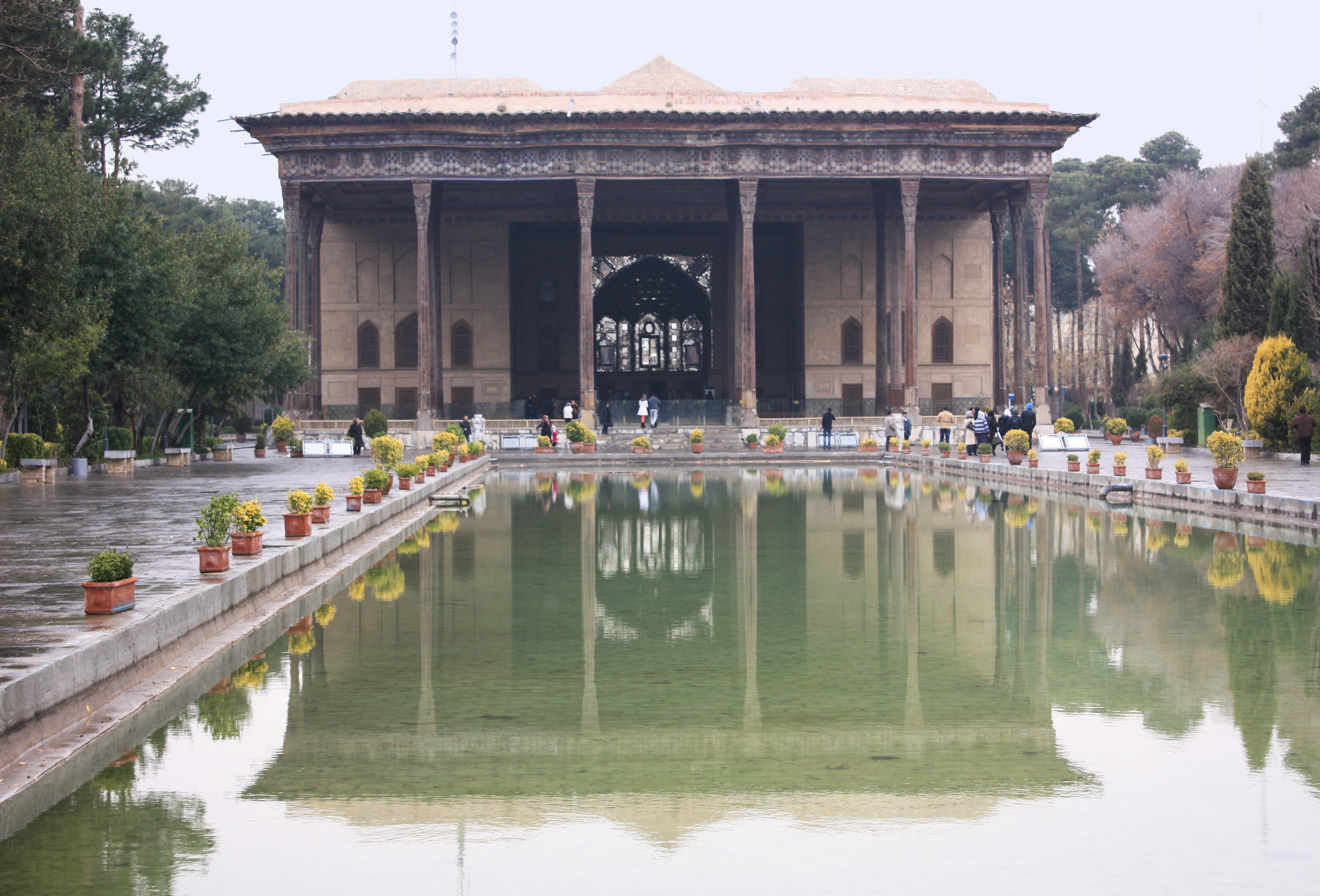
A World Heritage Persian garden site, Chehel Sotoun, in Iran

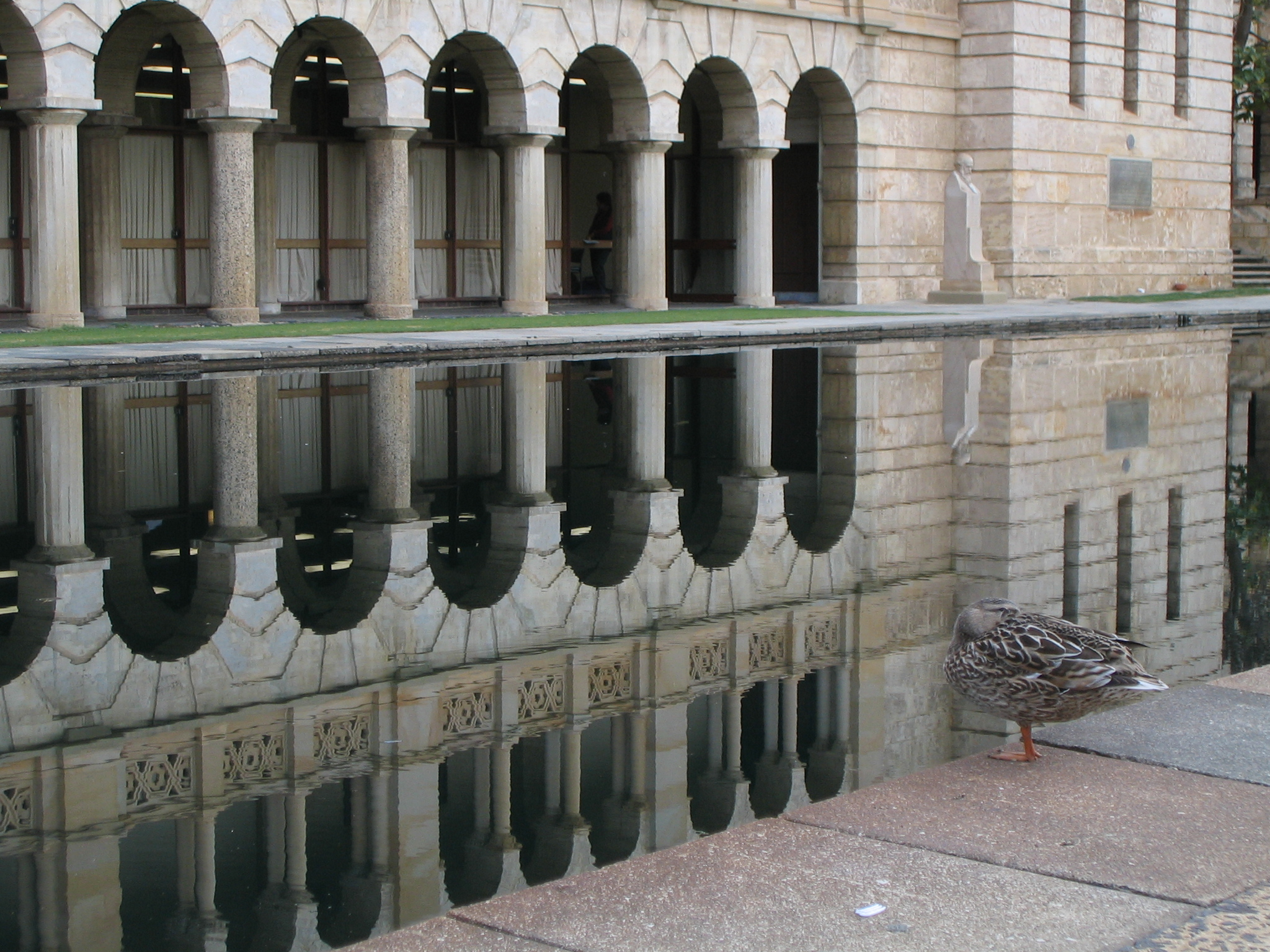
Reflecting Pool at the University of Western Australia

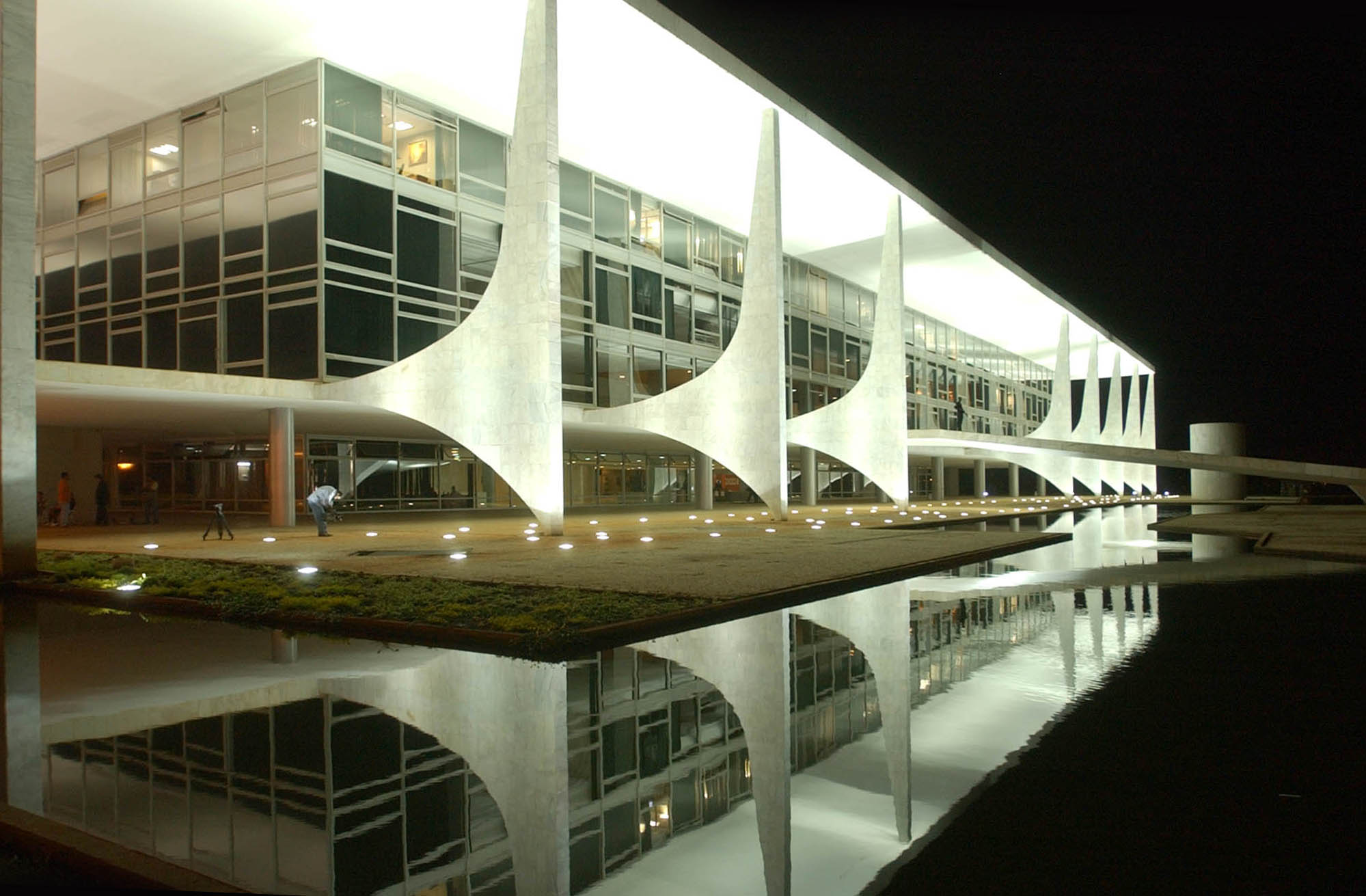
Reflecting pool of the Palácio do Planalto (Planalto Palace), in Brazil's modernist capital city Brasília

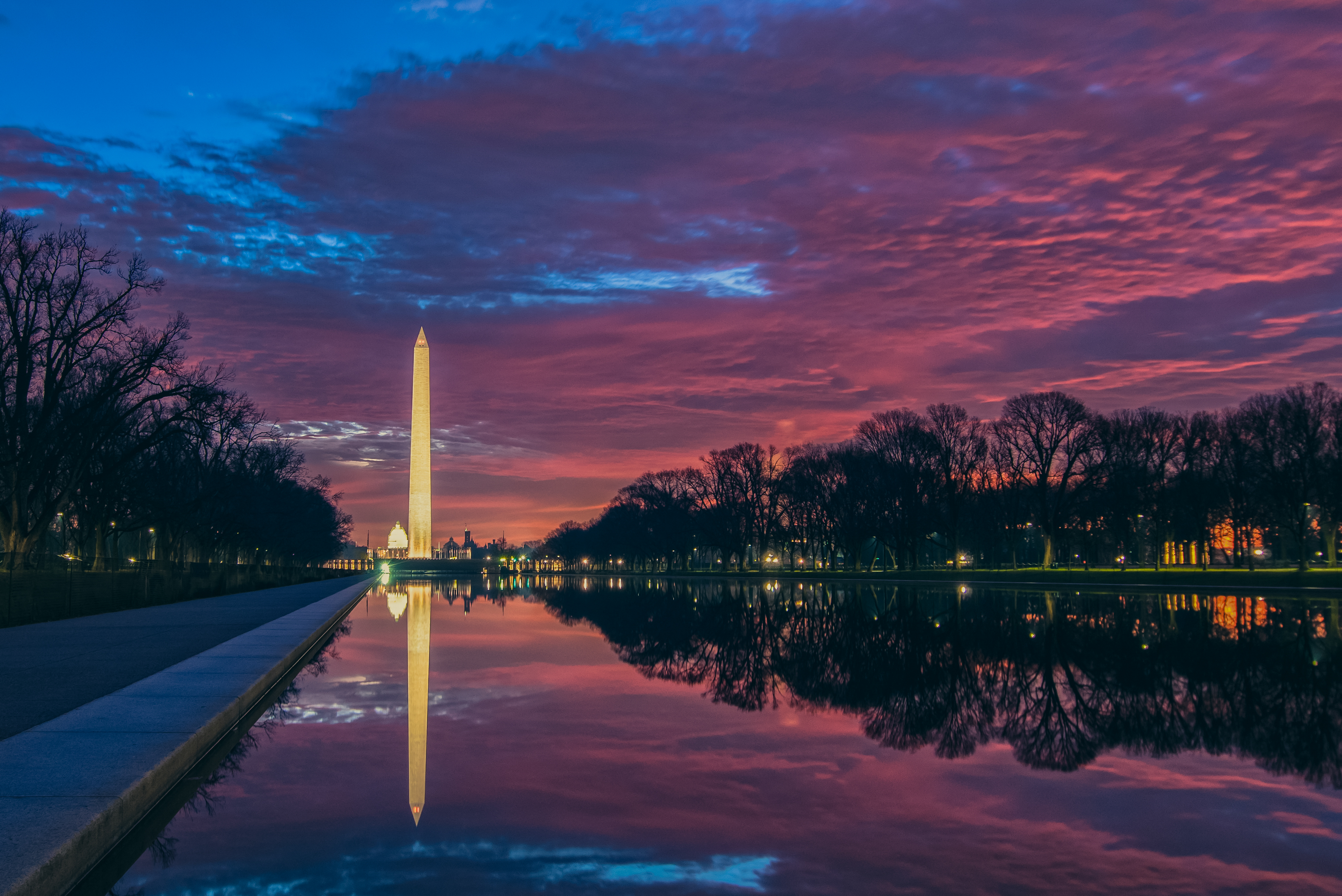
Washington Monument from the Lincoln Memorial Reflecting Pool in Washington, D.C.

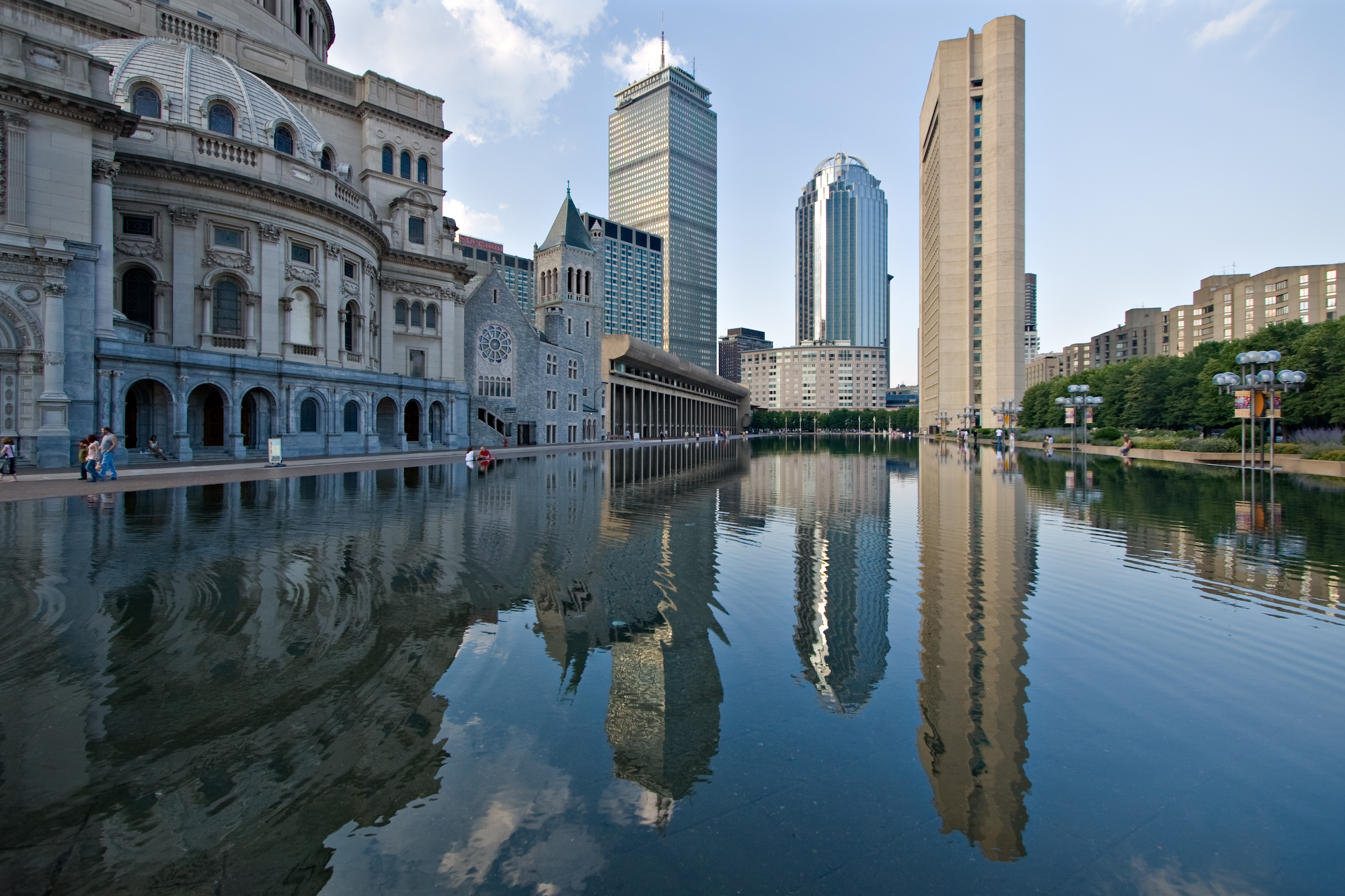
Reflecting pool at Christian Science Plaza in Boston, Massachusetts

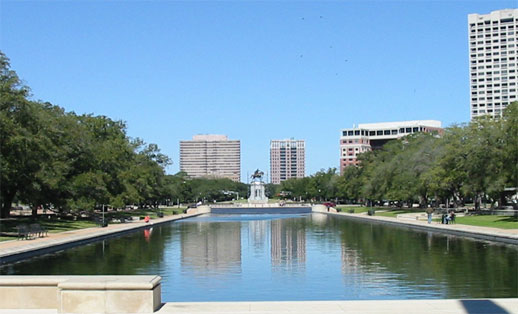
Mary Gibbs and Jesse H. Jones Reflection Pool in Hermann Park in Houston, Texas

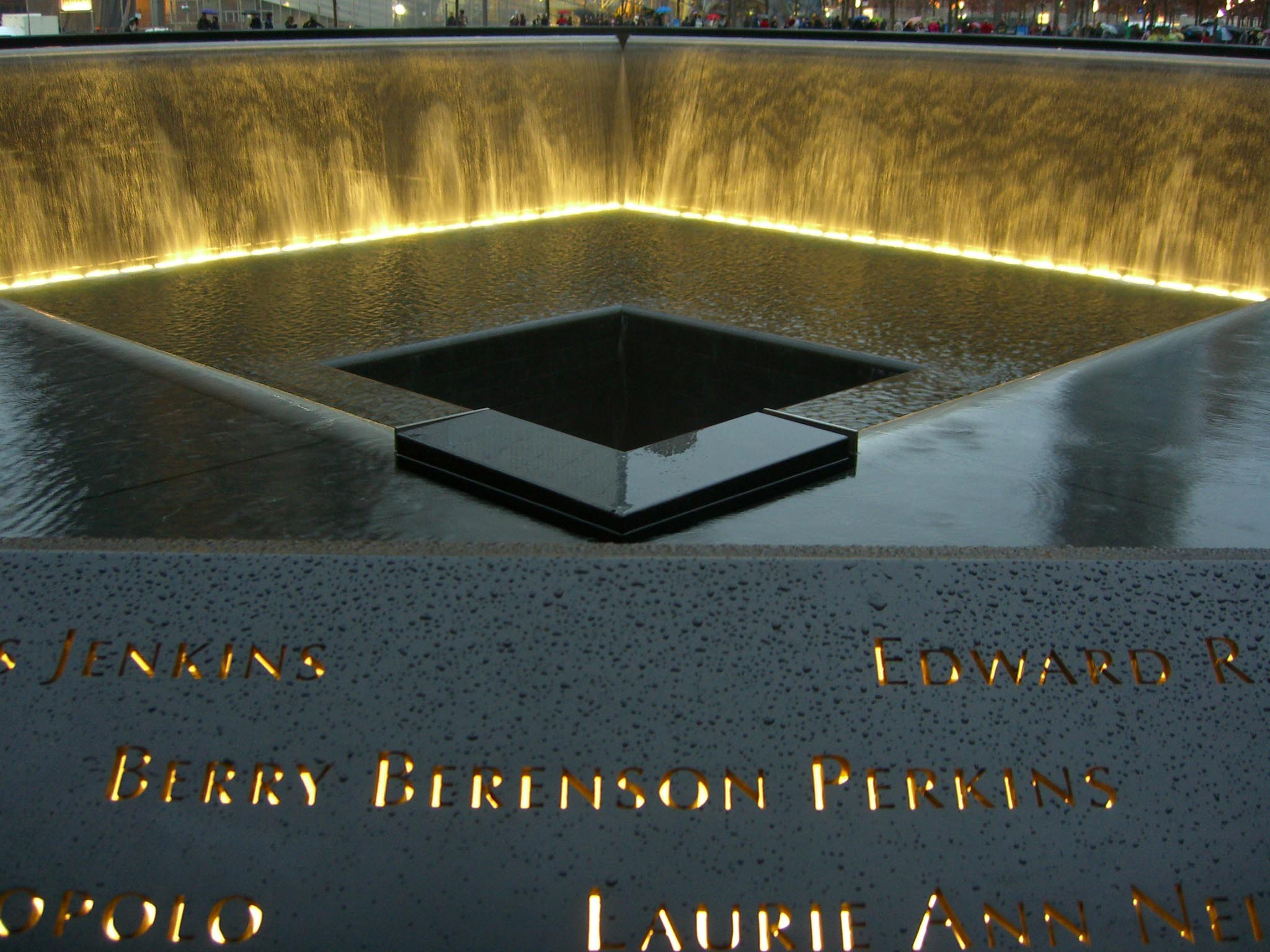
The North Reflecting Pool at the National September 11 Memorial and Museum at dusk, World Trade Center, New York

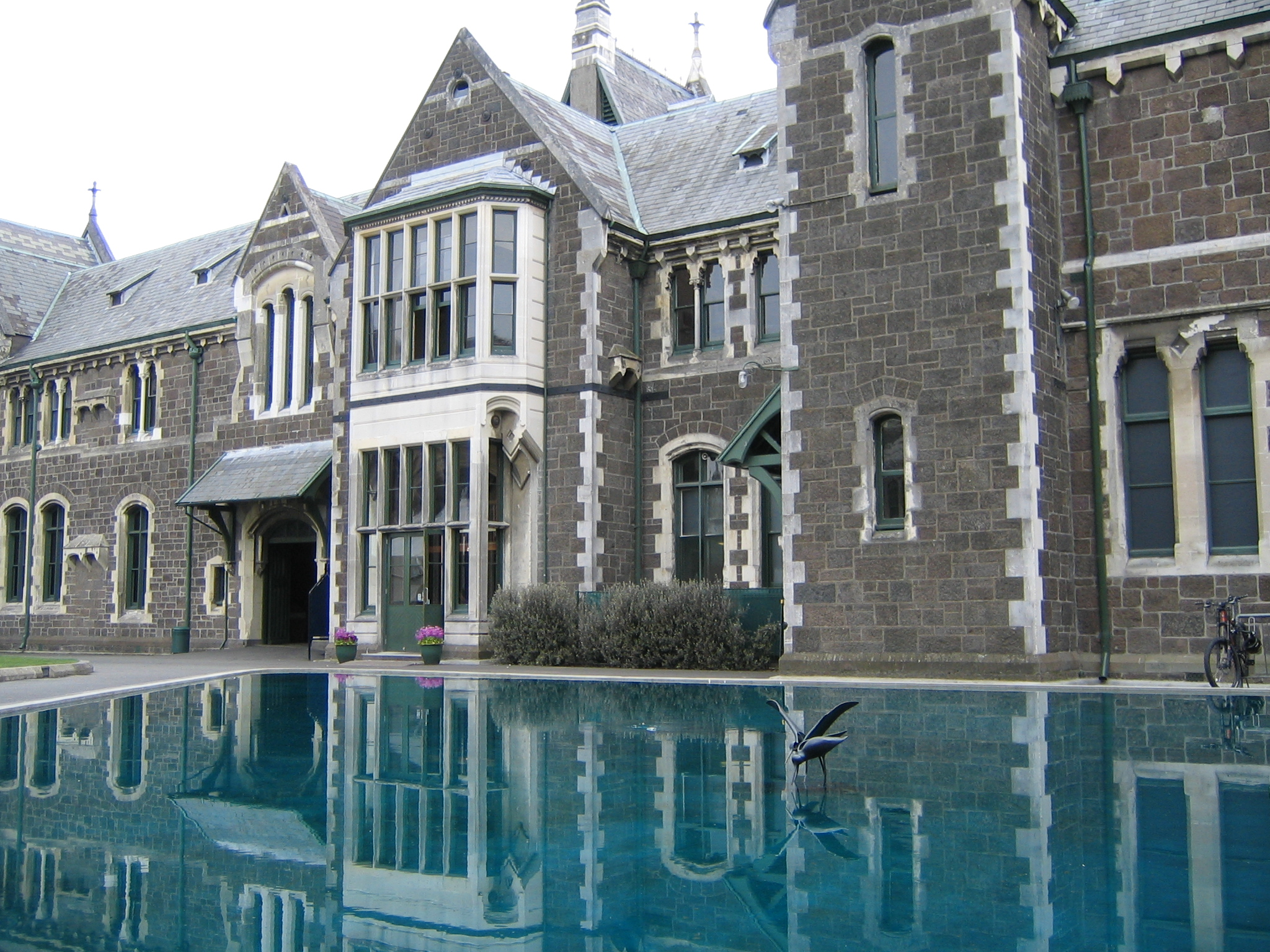
Reflecting pond at the Christchurch Arts Centre in New Zealand
