= Port de la Lune =

Coordinates: 44°50′50″N 0°35′00″W

Bordeaux, Port de la lune
UNESCO World Heritage Site
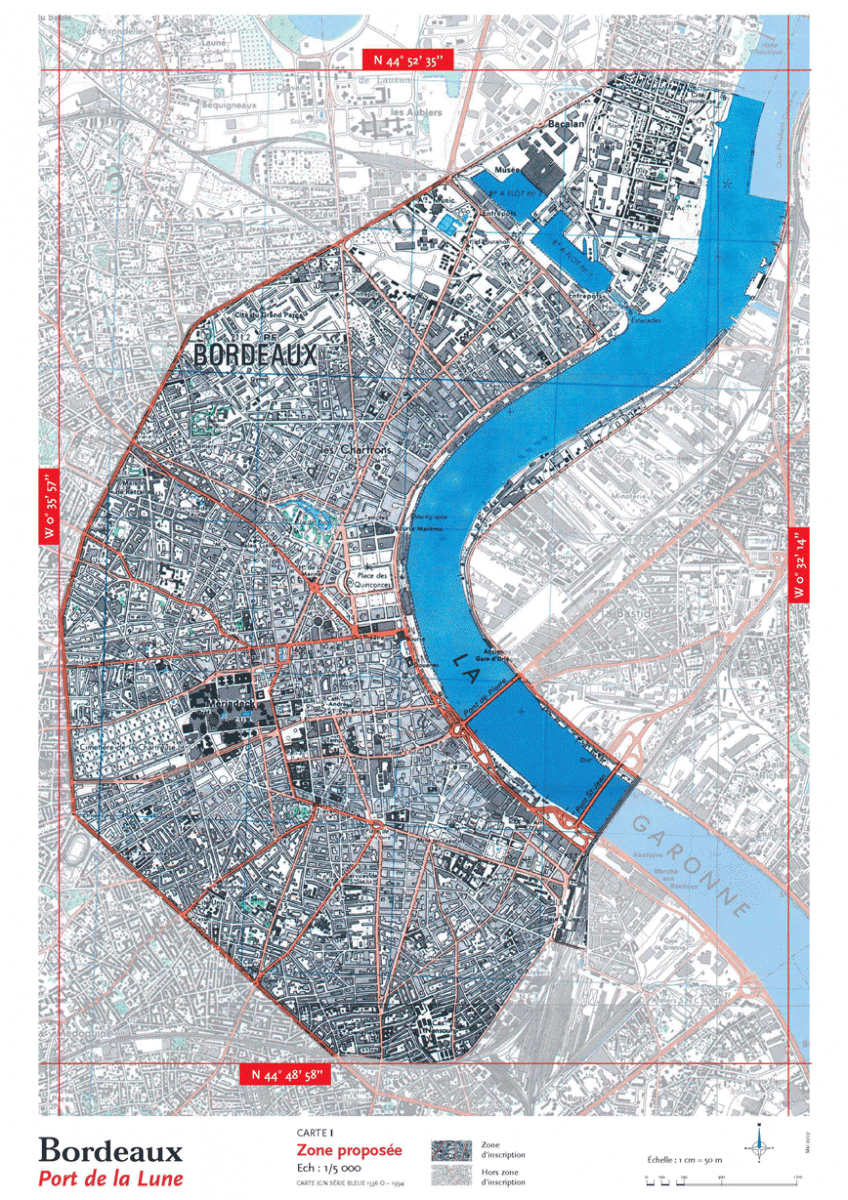
- The UNESCO area
- Interactive map of Bordeaux, Port de la lune
- Criteria: Cultural: ii, iv
- Reference: 1256
- Inscription: 2007 (31st Session)
- Area: 1,731 ha (4,280 acres)
- Buffer zone: 3,725 ha (9,200 acres)

The Port de la Lune (Port of the Moon) is the harbour of Bordeaux, France.

== History ==
The name dates back to the Middle Ages, due to the shape of the river crossing the city. It is represented by a crescent on the coat of arms of Bordeaux, and by three interlaced crescents in the logotype of the municipality.

In 2007, the Port of the Moon and roughly 1800 hectares of the surrounding urban area were listed a UNESCO World Heritage Site because of its outstanding and "innovative classical and neoclassical architectural trends" and Bordeaux's prominence as both the center of the historical wine industry and as a global trading center for more than 800 years. The World Heritage Site is the largest urban area inscribed by UNESCO (as of 2021), covering roughly 40% of the entire city's area.

UNESCO has also rewarded the municipality for its efforts to restore and embellish quays and facades of the city center, including the Place de la Bourse, Miroir d'eau, and the Grand-Théâtre.

== Gallery ==
Coat of arms of Bordeaux.

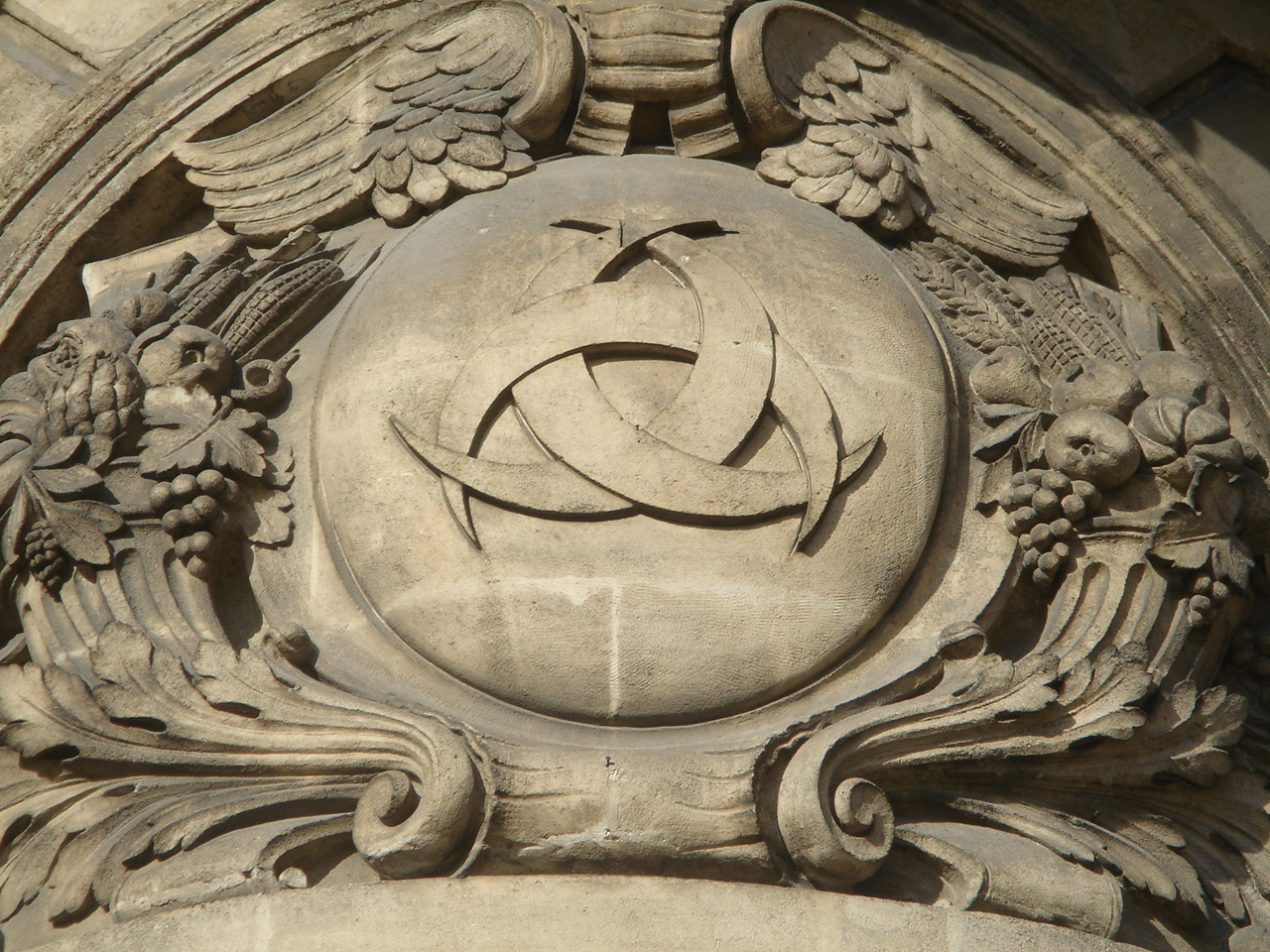
The Small Coat of arms.

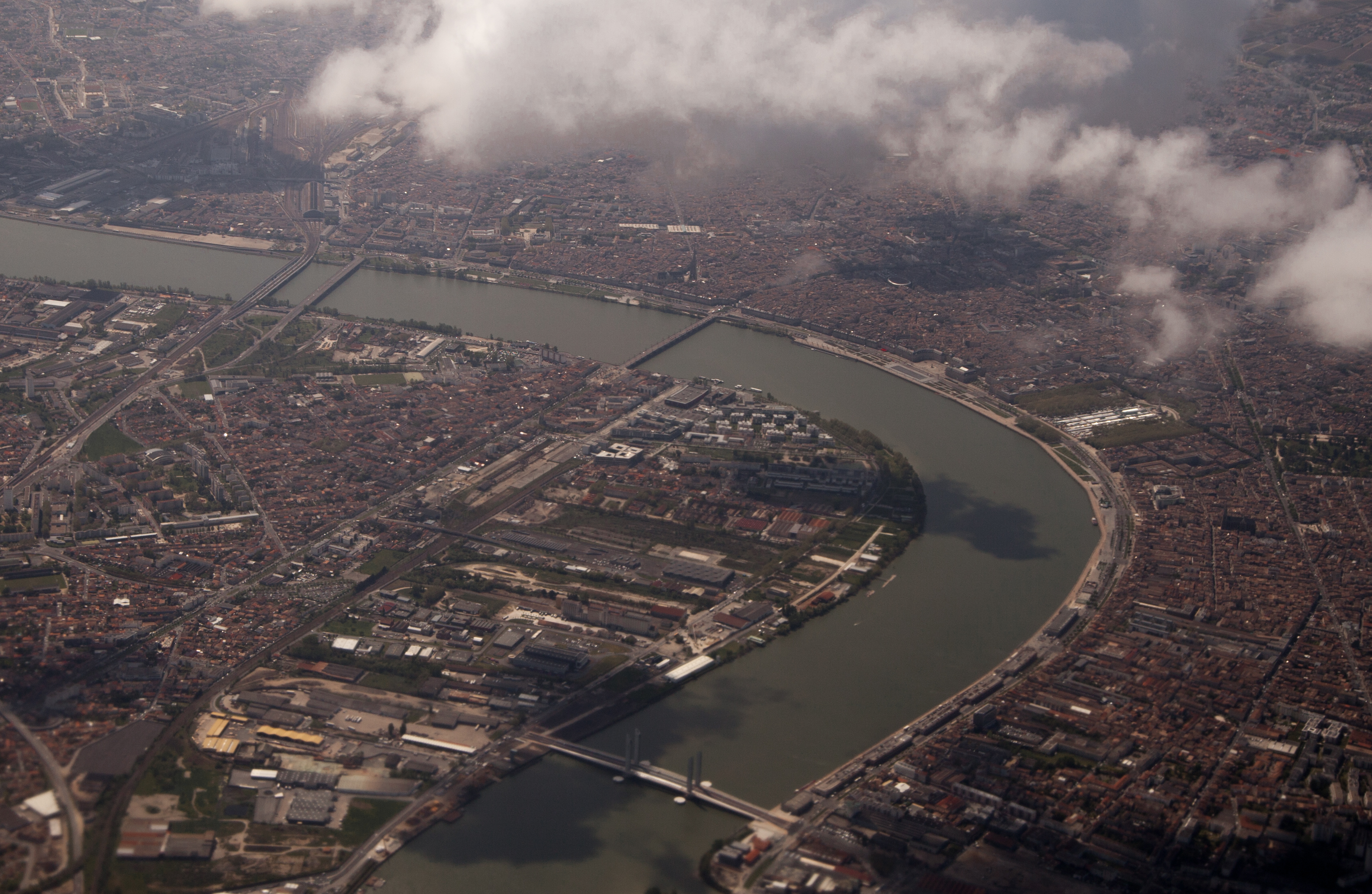
View from a plane.

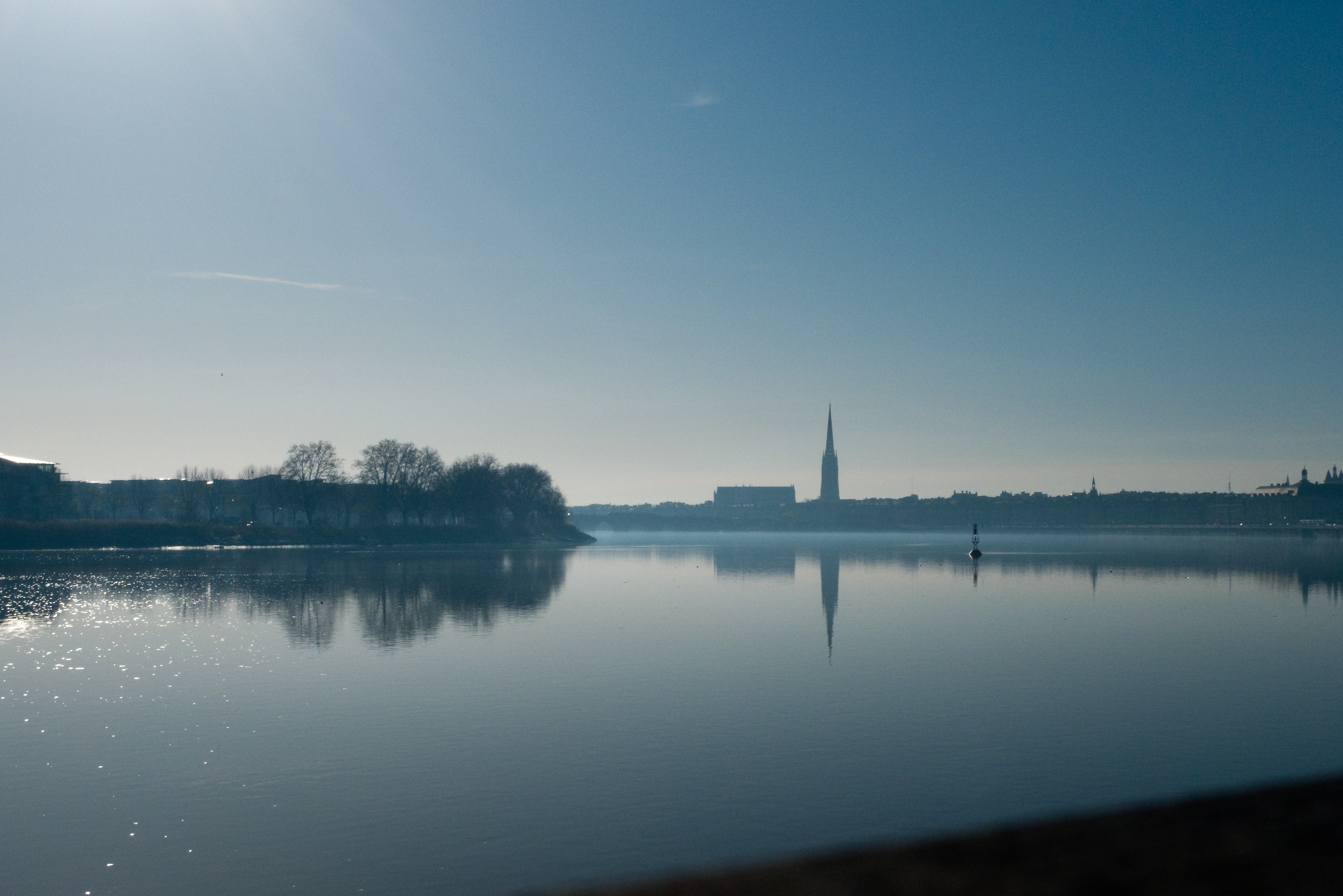
The Port de la Lune.

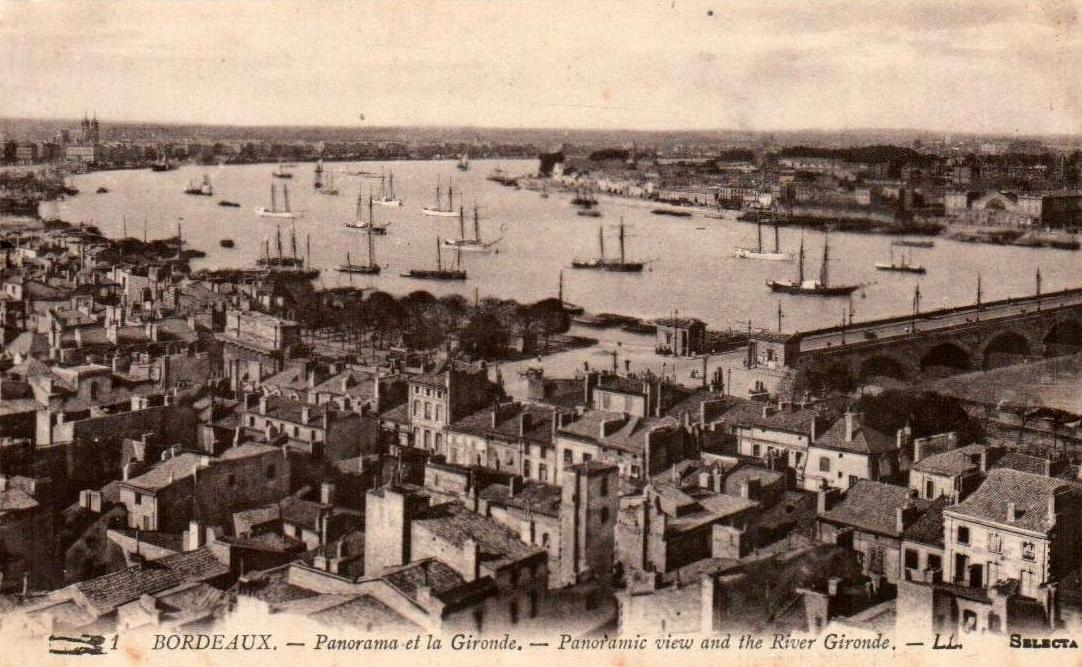
The Port de la Lune, perspective from the top of the spire Saint-Michel.

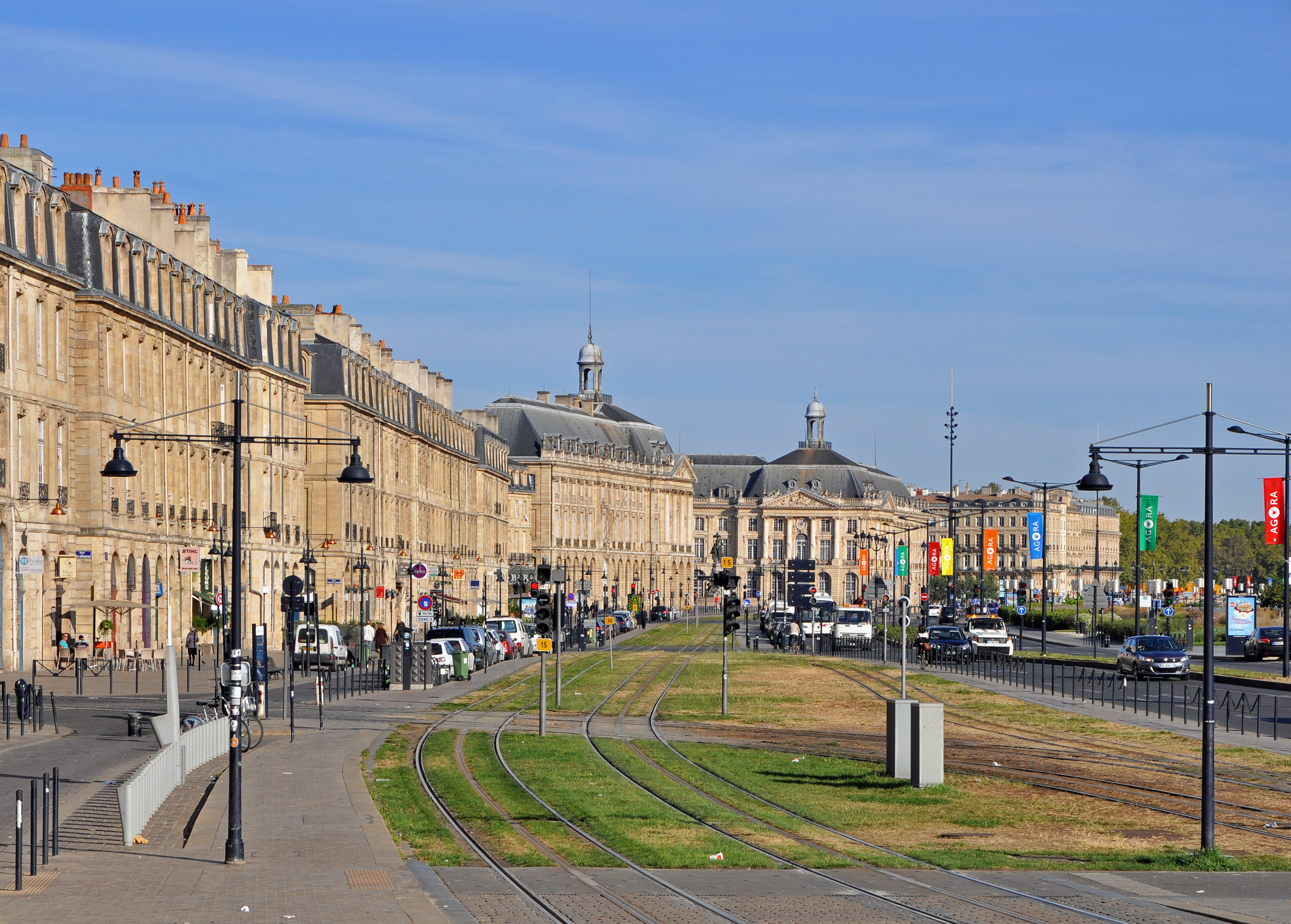
Scheduled facades of the quai Richelieu.

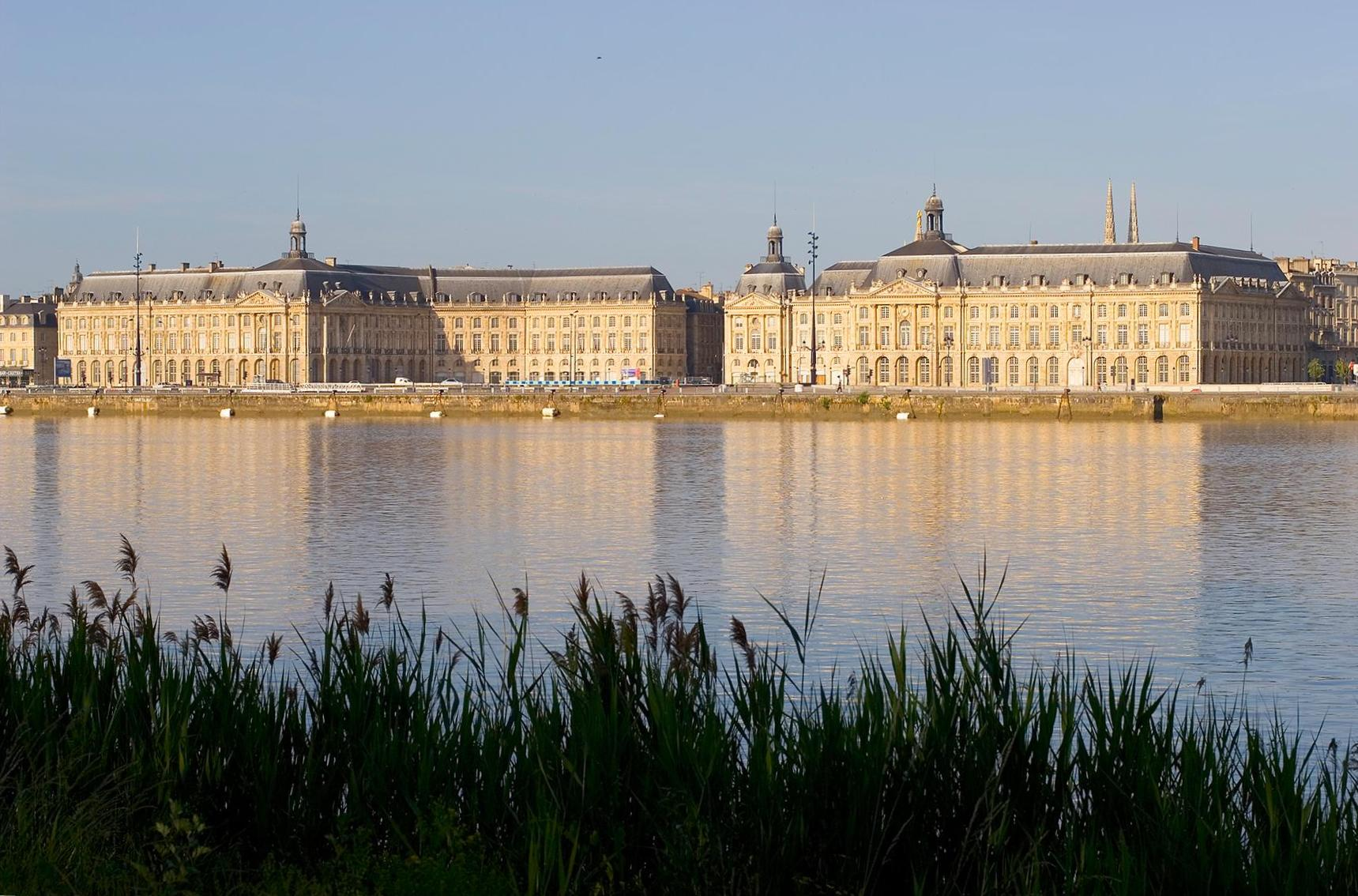
The Place de la Bourse.

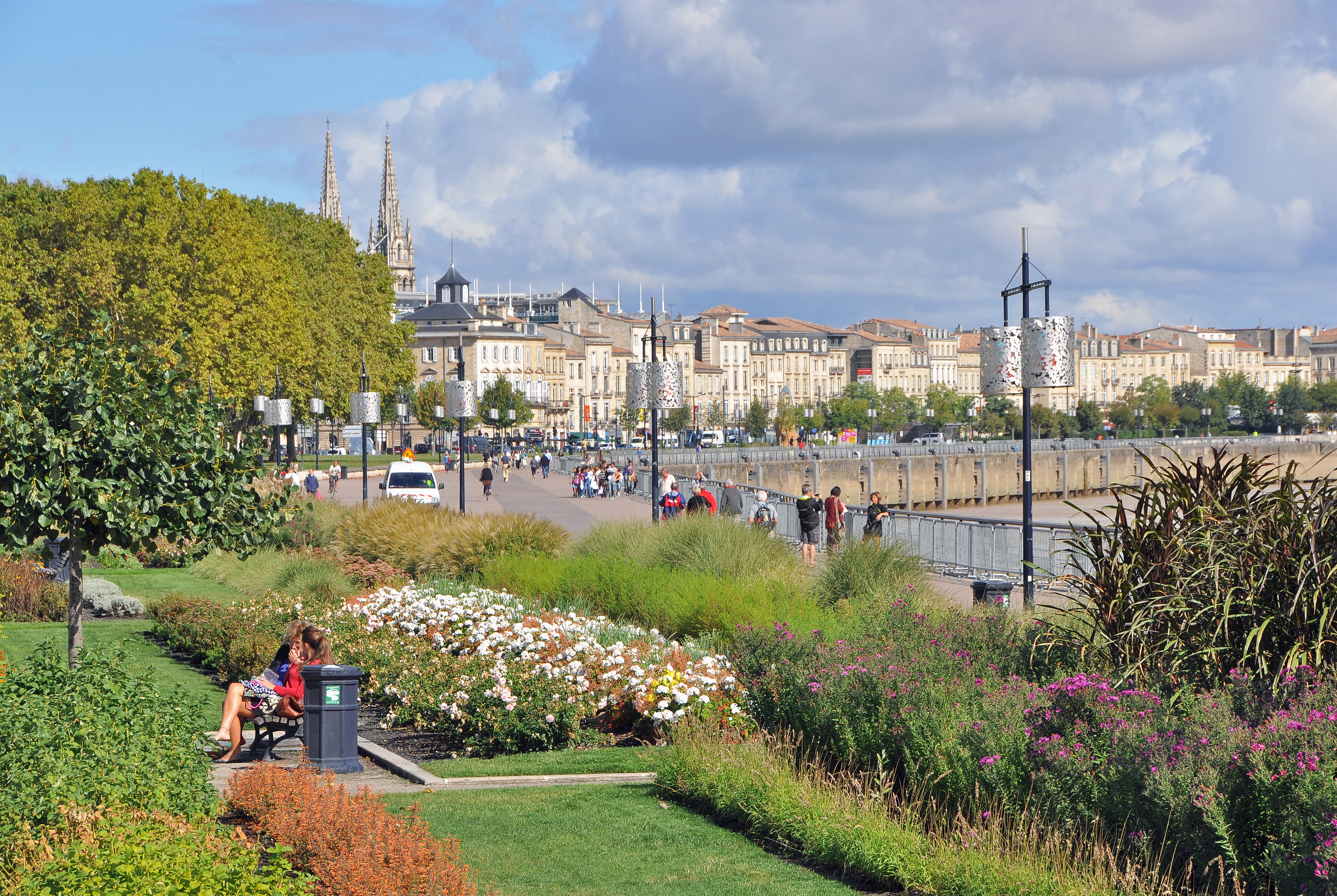
Quai Louis XVIII and Quai des Chartrons.

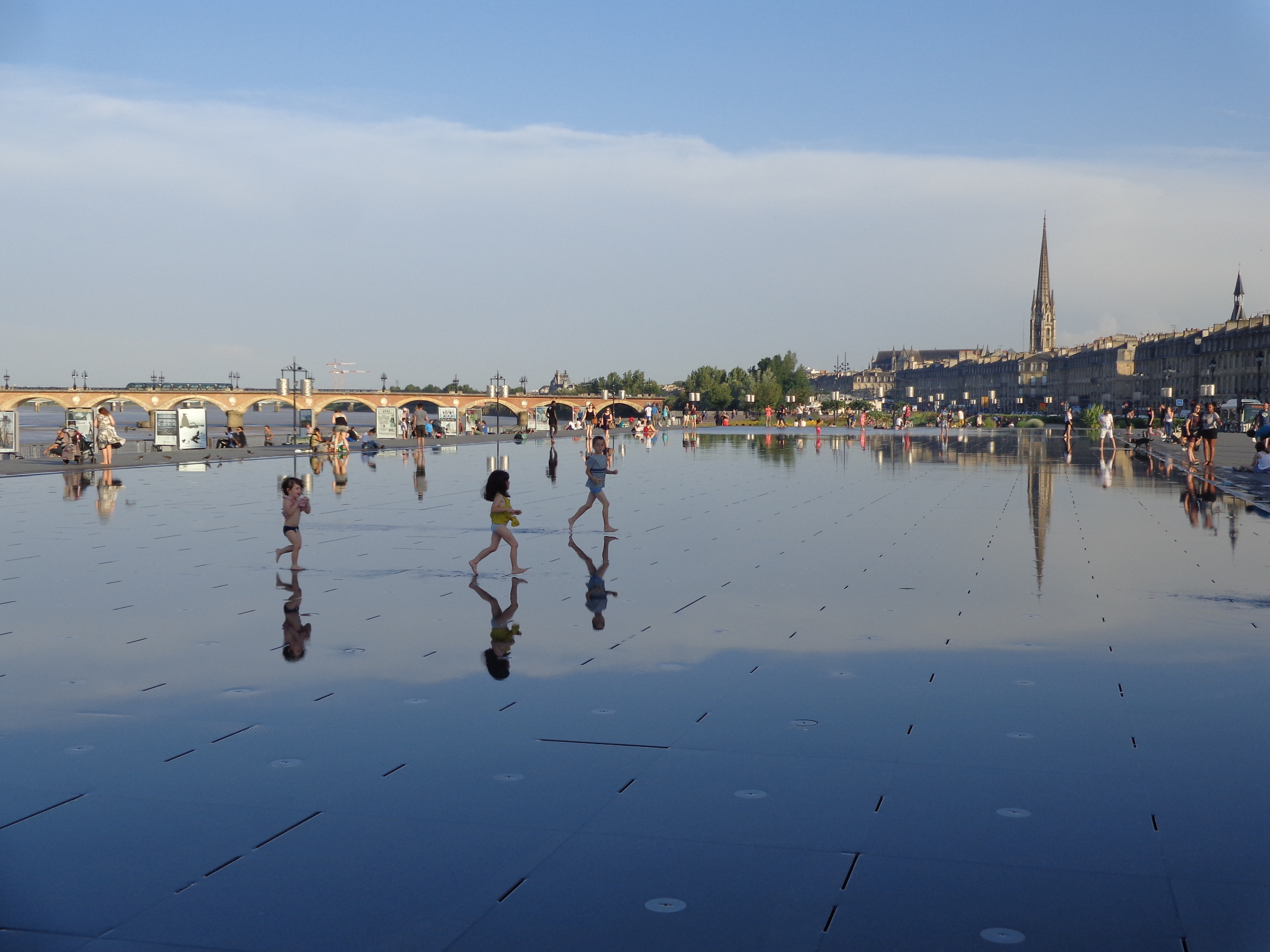
The Miroir d'eau, the Pont de pierre and the Basilica of St. Michael.

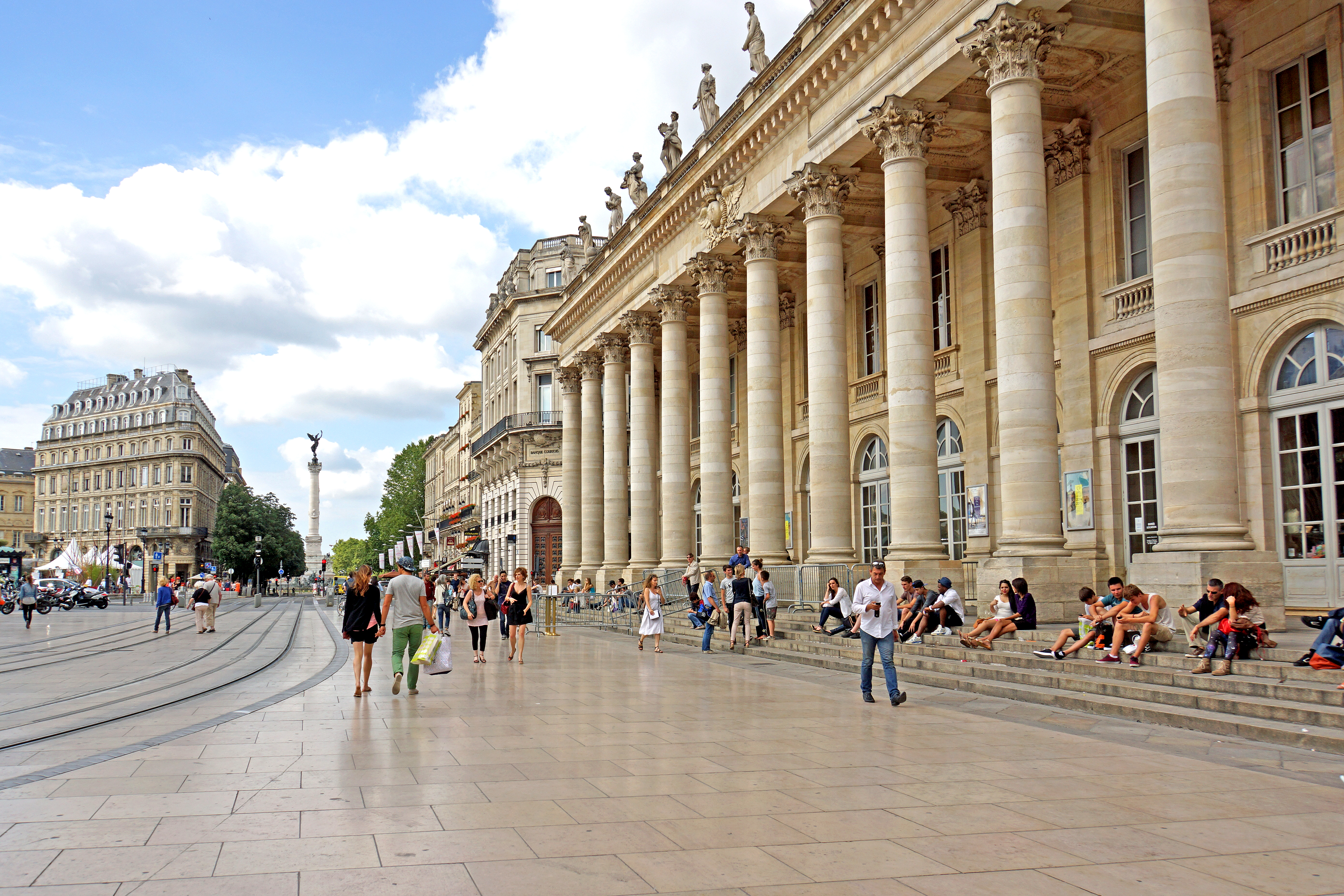
The Place de la Comédie with the Grand-Théâtre.
