= Bec d'Ambès =

Bec d’Ambes
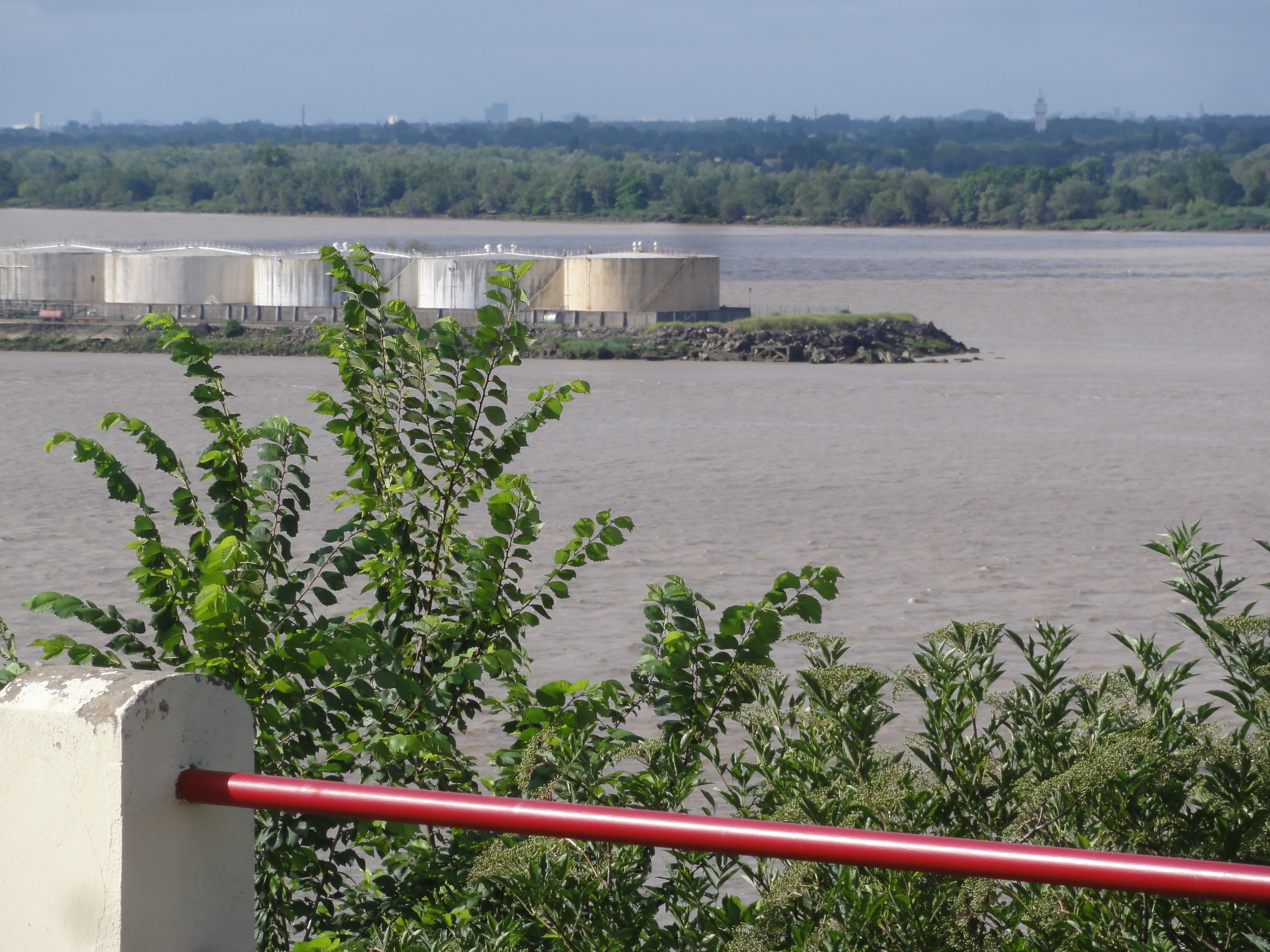
- The Bec d'Ambès seen from Bayon-sur-Gironde
- Interactive map of Bec d’Ambes
- Location in France

Location
- Country: France
- Location: Gironde estuary
- Coordinates: 44°59.88′N 0°33.18′W
- UN/LOCODE: FRAMS

Details
- No. of berths: 3
- Draft depth: 12.5 metres (41 ft)

Statistics
- Website; Official website

The Bec d'Ambès (French pronunciation: [bɛk dɑ̃bɛs], literally Beak of Ambès) is the point of confluence of the rivers Garonne and Dordogne, in the Gironde estuary. Situated 15 miles north of Bordeaux, it has an oil refinery which was destroyed by bombing during World War II, but rebuilt after the war. It is in the Ambès commune.

== Port and refinery ==
The Bec d’Ambes Terminal is an oil terminal, operated by the Port of Bordeaux and consists of three berths - 501, 511 and 512 - handling vessels up to 70,000 tonnes displacement. It handles crude oil, petroleum products and liquid ammonia.
