= Miroir d'eau =

Reflecting pool in Bordeaux, France

Coordinates: 44.8417°N 0.5691°W

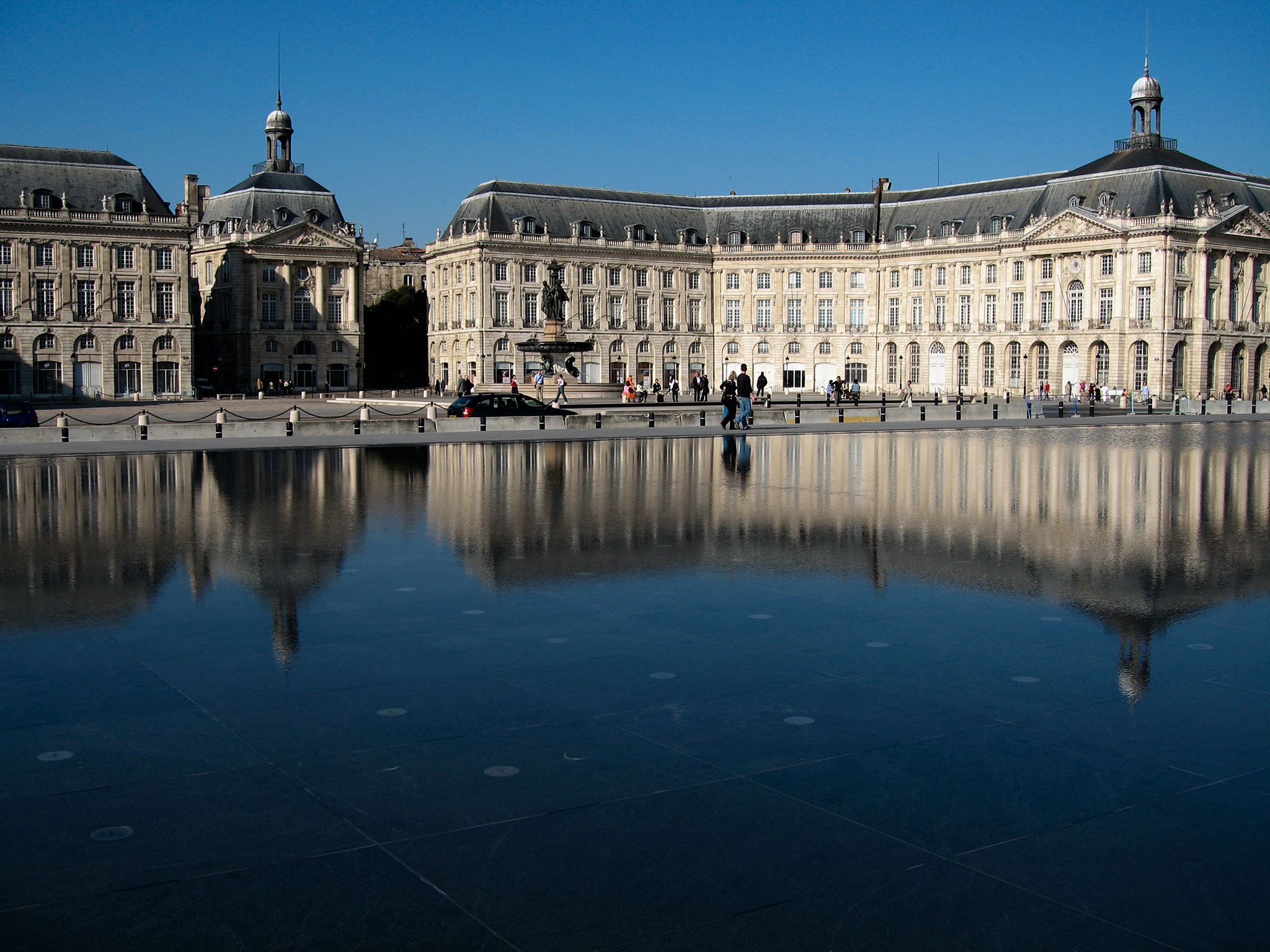
The Miroir d'eau in Bordeaux

The Miroir d'eau (French: [miʁwaʁ d‿o]; English: Water Mirror) in Bordeaux, France is a reflecting pool covering 3,450 square metres (37,100 sq ft). Located on the quay of the Garonne in front of the Place de la Bourse, it was built in 2006.

== Reflecting pool ==
In the context of the quays embellishment operation (2000s), it was designed by landscape artist Michel Corajoud. Then it was built by the fountain-maker Jean-Max Llorca and the architect Pierre Gangnet, pupil of Antoine Fournie, who reused a former underground warehouse to set the machinery and reservoir.

The reflecting pool is made of granite slabs covered by 2 cm of water, and a system allows it to create mist every 15 minutes.

The Miroir d'eau works only from April to October, and it is the most-photographed site of the Port of the Moon.

== Gallery ==
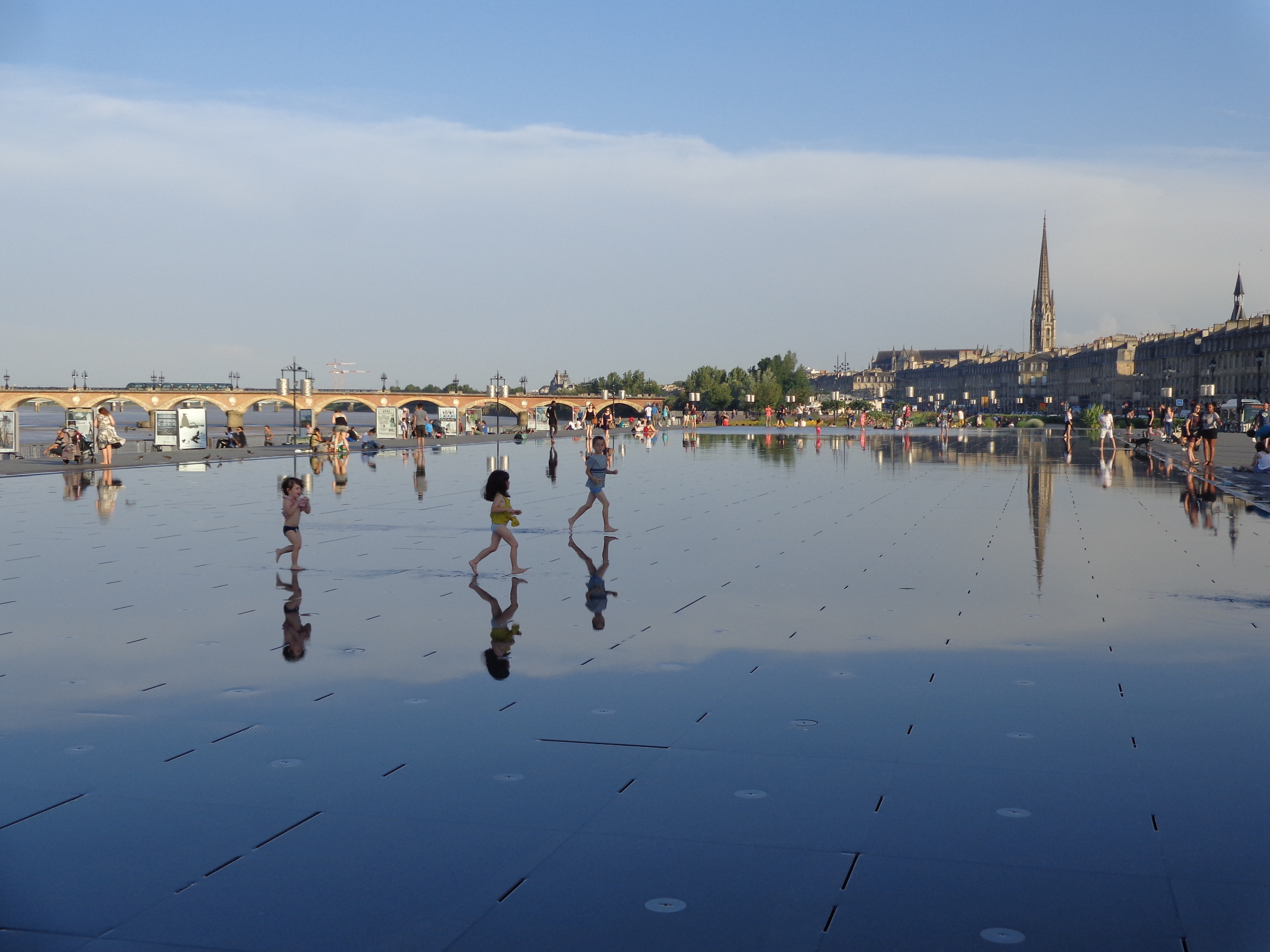
The Miroir d'eau

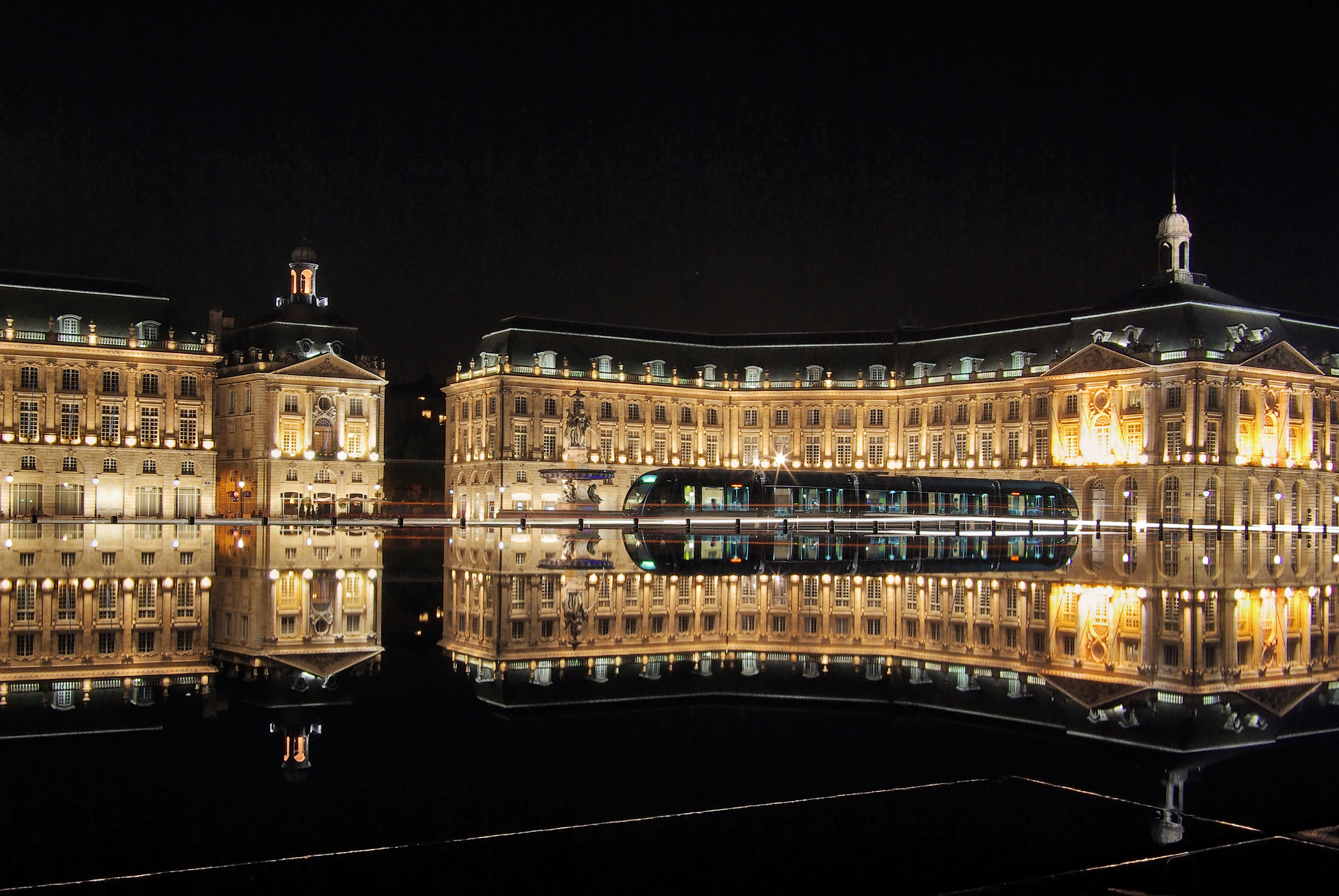
The Miroir d'eau by night

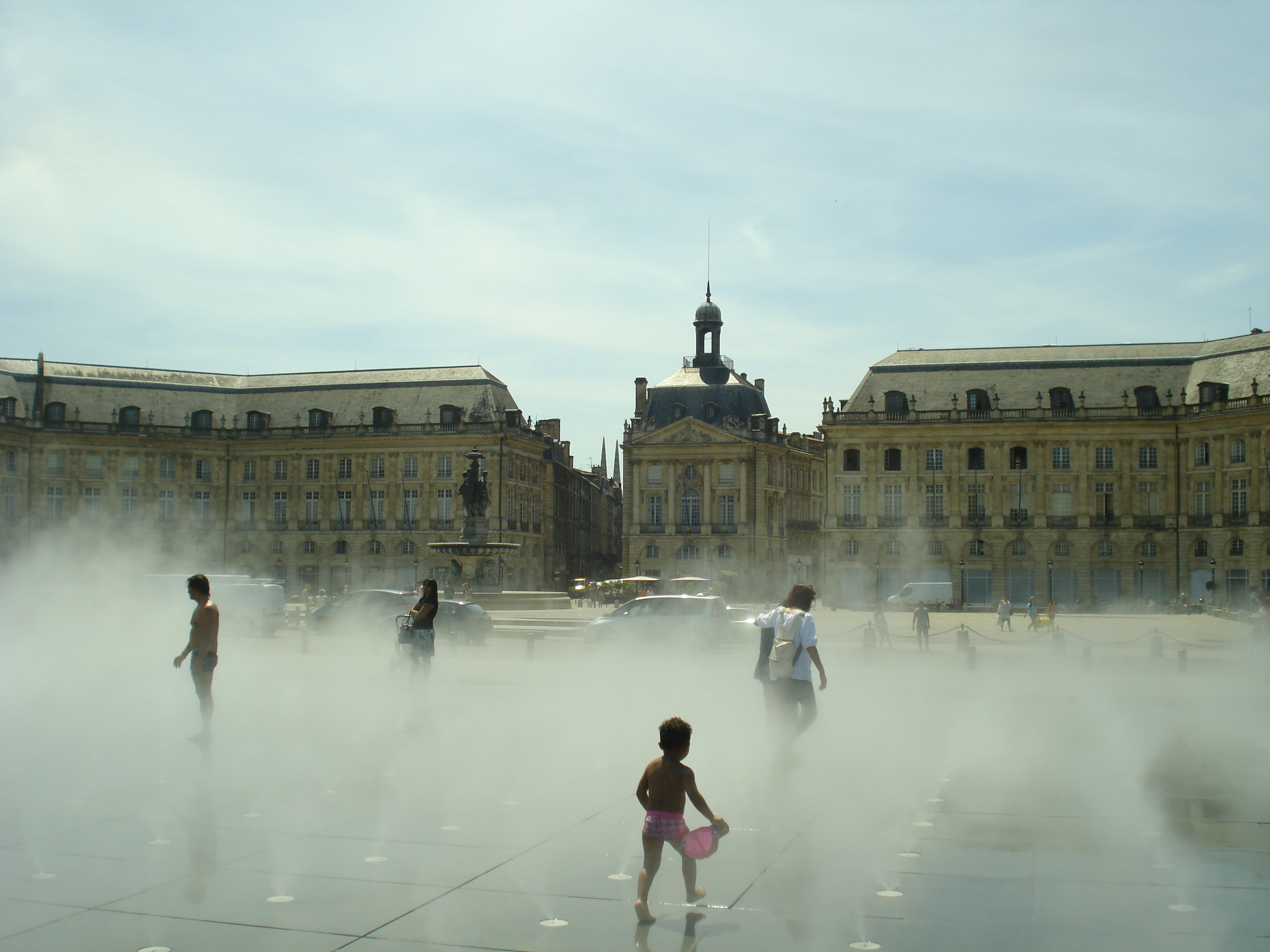
The Miroir d'eau misting

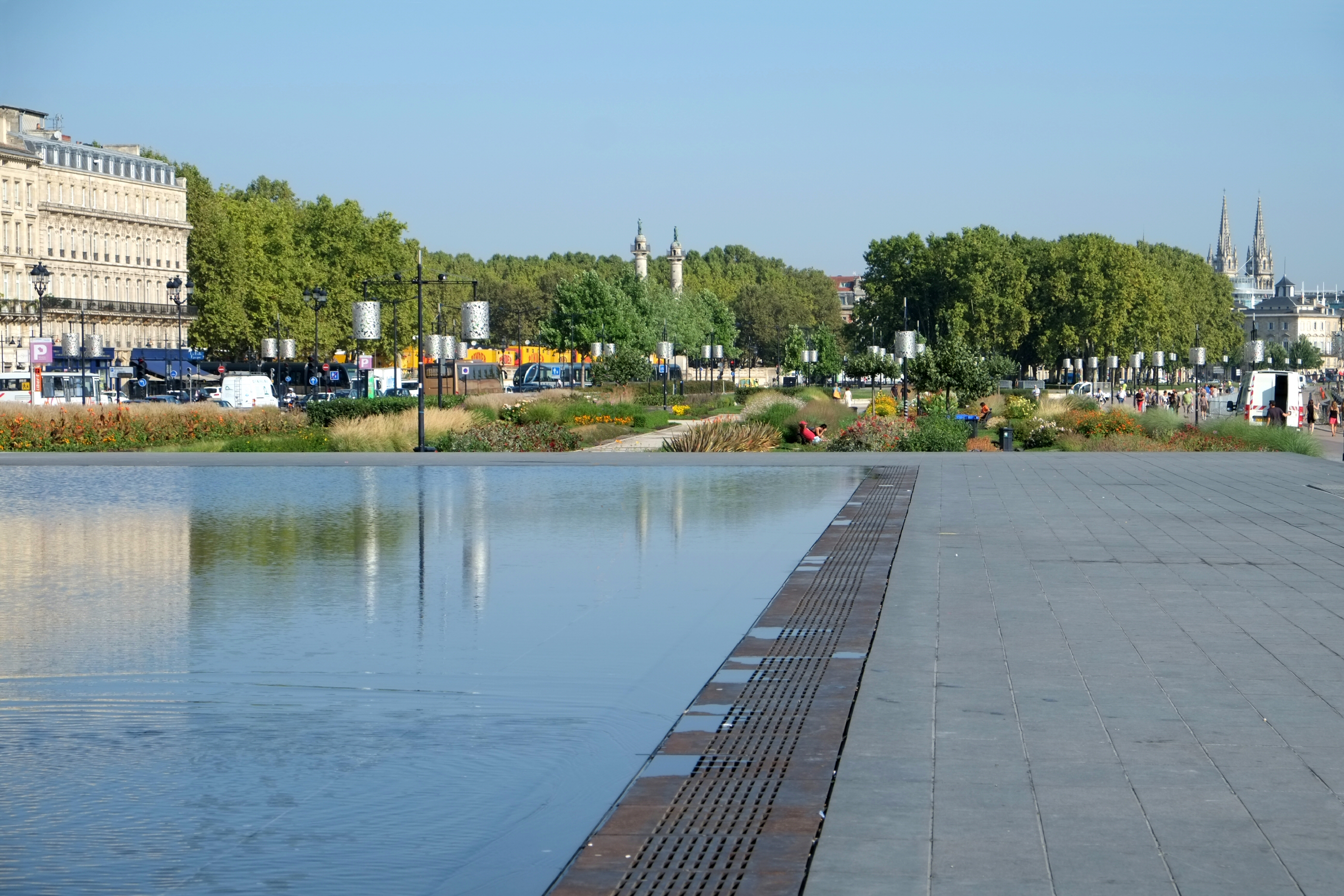
The Miroir d'eau and the Jardin des Lumières

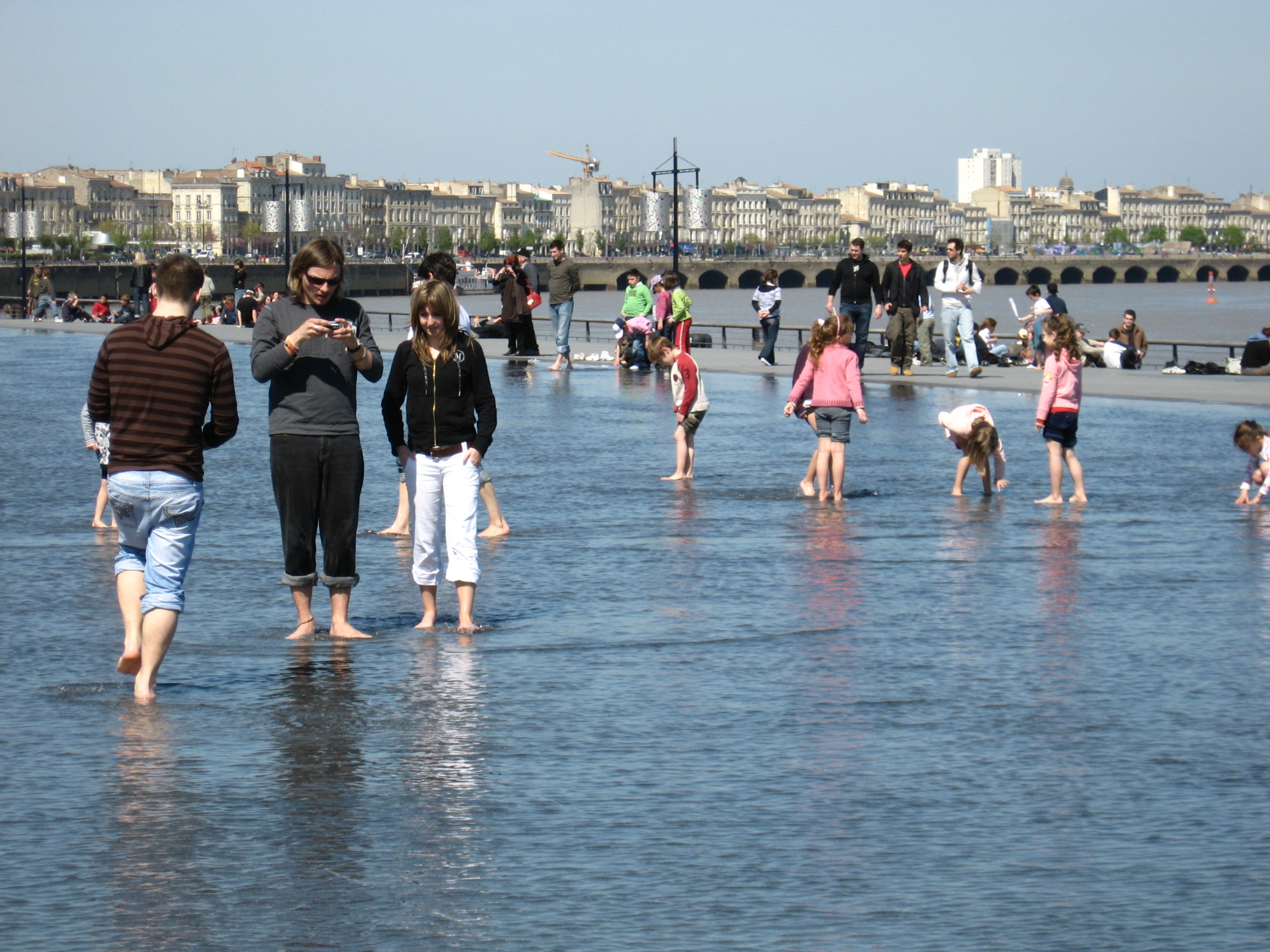
Water play

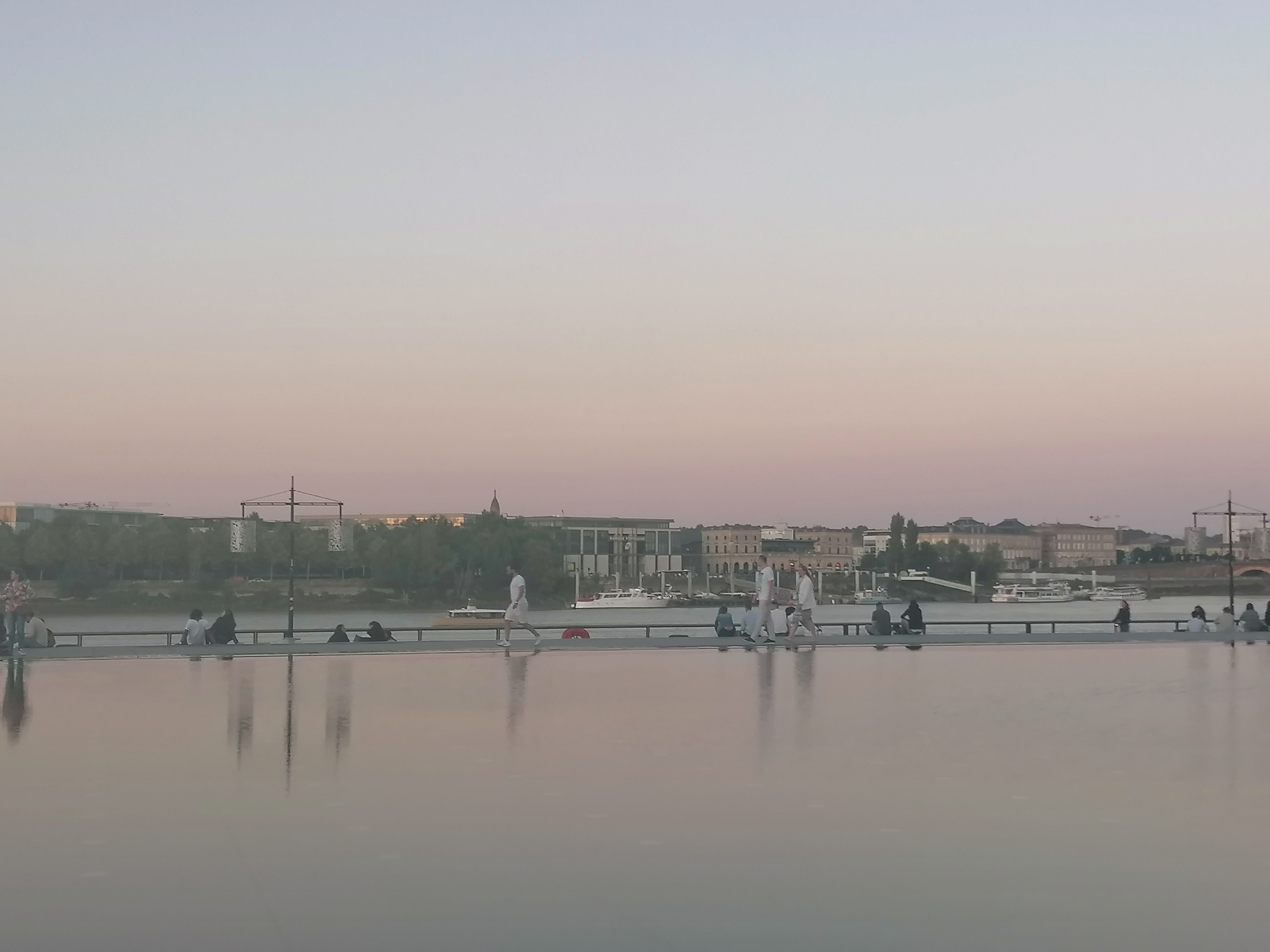
Sunset
