= Place de la Bourse, Bordeaux =

Square in Bordeaux, France

Coordinates: 44.8415°N 0.5700°W

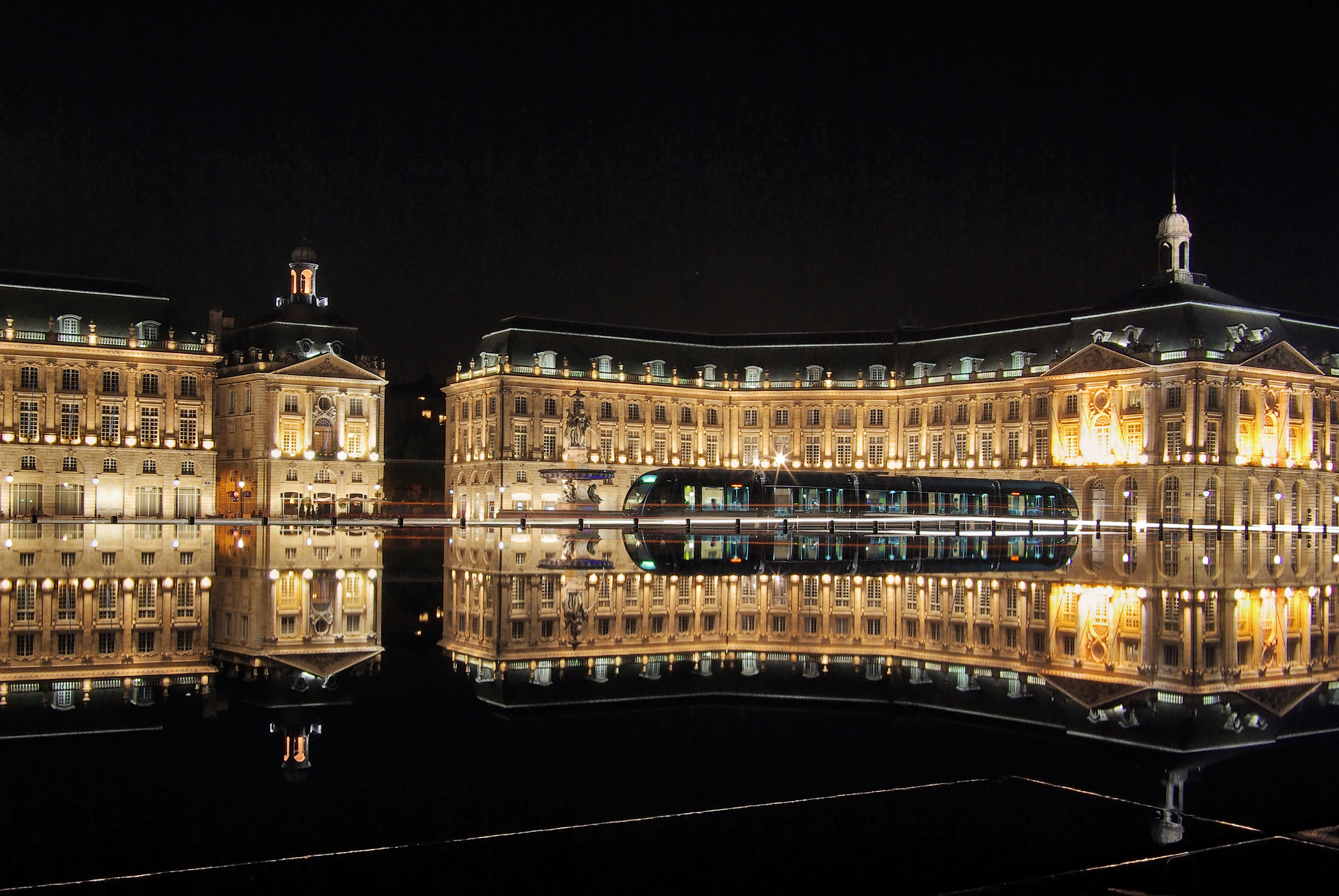
Place de la Bourse at night with the Miroir d'eau and Bordeaux tramway

The Place de la Bourse (French pronunciation: [plas də la buʁs], "Stock Exchange Square") is a square in Bordeaux, France, and one of the city's most recognisable sights. Built from 1730 to 1775 along the river Garonne, it was a multi-building development designed by the architect Jacques Gabriel and his son Ange-Jacques Gabriel. It is within the historic part of the city that has been recognized on the UNESCO World Heritage List as "an outstanding urban and architectural ensemble" of the 18th century.

== History ==
The Place de la Bourse was designed between 1735 and 1738 by Jacques Gabriel, and built by his son Ange-Jacques Gabriel, the principal architect of King Louis XV. In the original plan, a statue of Louis XV was erected on the square, which was destroyed during the French Revolution. After the statue's removal, a Tree of Liberty was planted, and after the Restoration, a Corinthian column-fountain was built on the square. Finally, in 1869 the Three Graces sculpture was installed in the same location.

Design of the surrounding buildings was completed by Jacques Gabriel in 1739; the project was issued for construction two weeks after the architect's death. His son Ange-Jacques Gabriel was then put in charge and finished the buildings' construction.

== Architecture ==
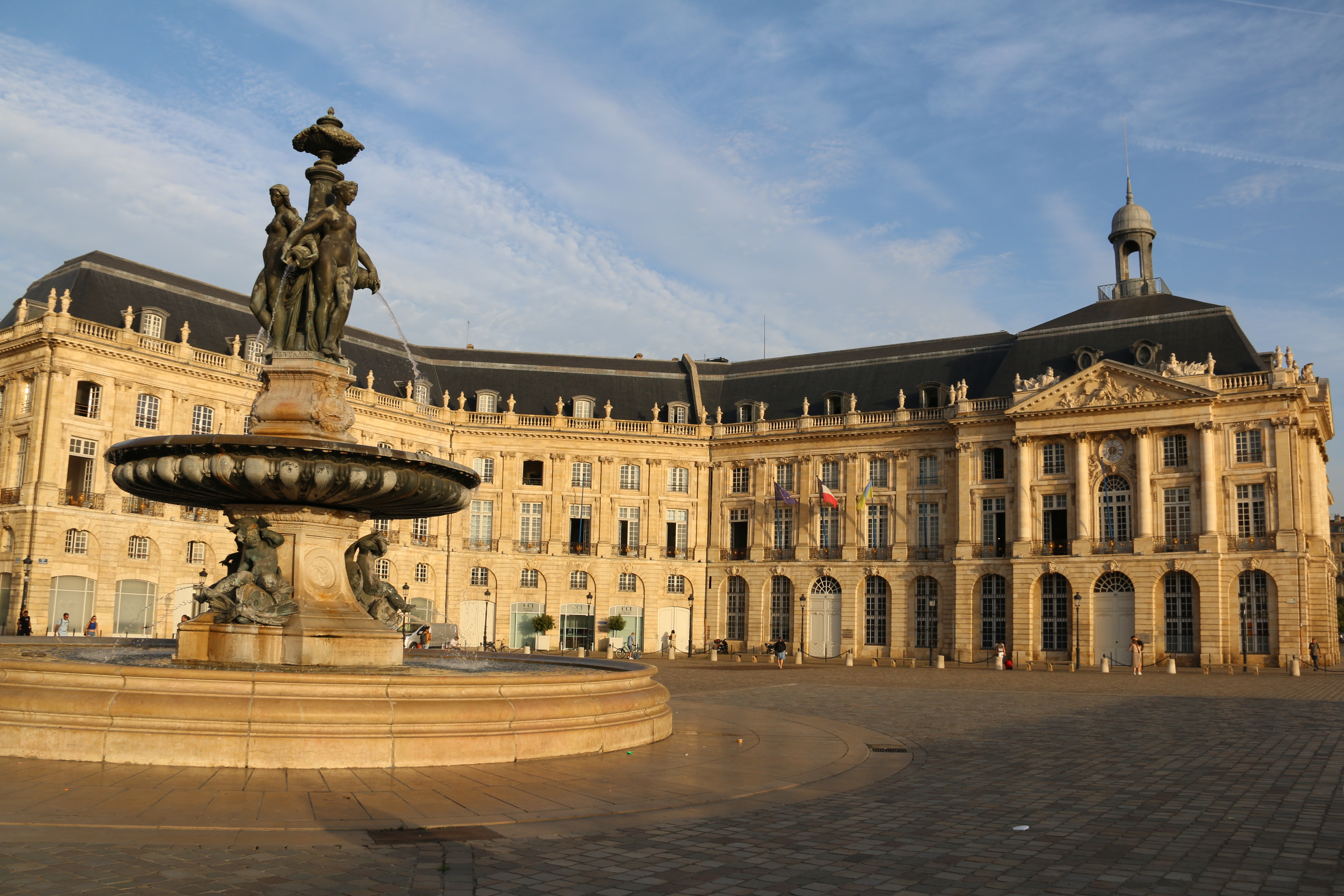
Facades drawn by Jacques Gabriel

This square is one of the most representative works of 18th-century neoclassical French architecture. In the north stood the Palais de la Bourse (current Chamber of Commerce and Industry of Bordeaux) and in the south the Hotel des Fermes (now Interregional Directorate of Customs and Indirect Rights, which houses the National Museum of Customs). The sculptures represent Minerve protecting the arts and Mercury favoring the commerce of the city.

In 2007, it was included on the UNESCO World Heritage List as "an outstanding urban and architectural ensemble" of the 18th century.
