= Gourmet Touring =

Tourism company operating in the Bordeaux

Gourmet Touring is a tourism company operating in the Bordeaux wine region of France. Founded in 2003 by John and Siân Mears, the company offers GPS-assisted tours of the area, with particular focus being placed on high quality food and wine. Initially the business was built around the rental of classic cars, but subsequently the focus has shifted towards providing a premium sightseeing tour accompanied by visits, typically, to Michelin starred restaurants and vineyards.

== Publicity ==
Despite the small size of the business, Gourmet Touring holidays have featured in a number of UK magazines and newspapers, the most notable of which include a review in The Times and a place on The Independent's Ten Essential Roadtrips As well as this, online magazines such as Lifestyle + Travel have written features on the organisation.
