= New York tram stop =

Tram stop in Bordeaux, France

New York

General information
- Location: Bordeaux; France
- Coordinates: 44°52′15″N 0°32′50″W
- Line: Line B

History
- Opened: 20 October 2008

Services
Preceding station	Bordeaux tramway	Following station
Rue Achard towards France Alouette or Pessac Centre	Line B	Brandenburg towards Berges de la Garonne
Location
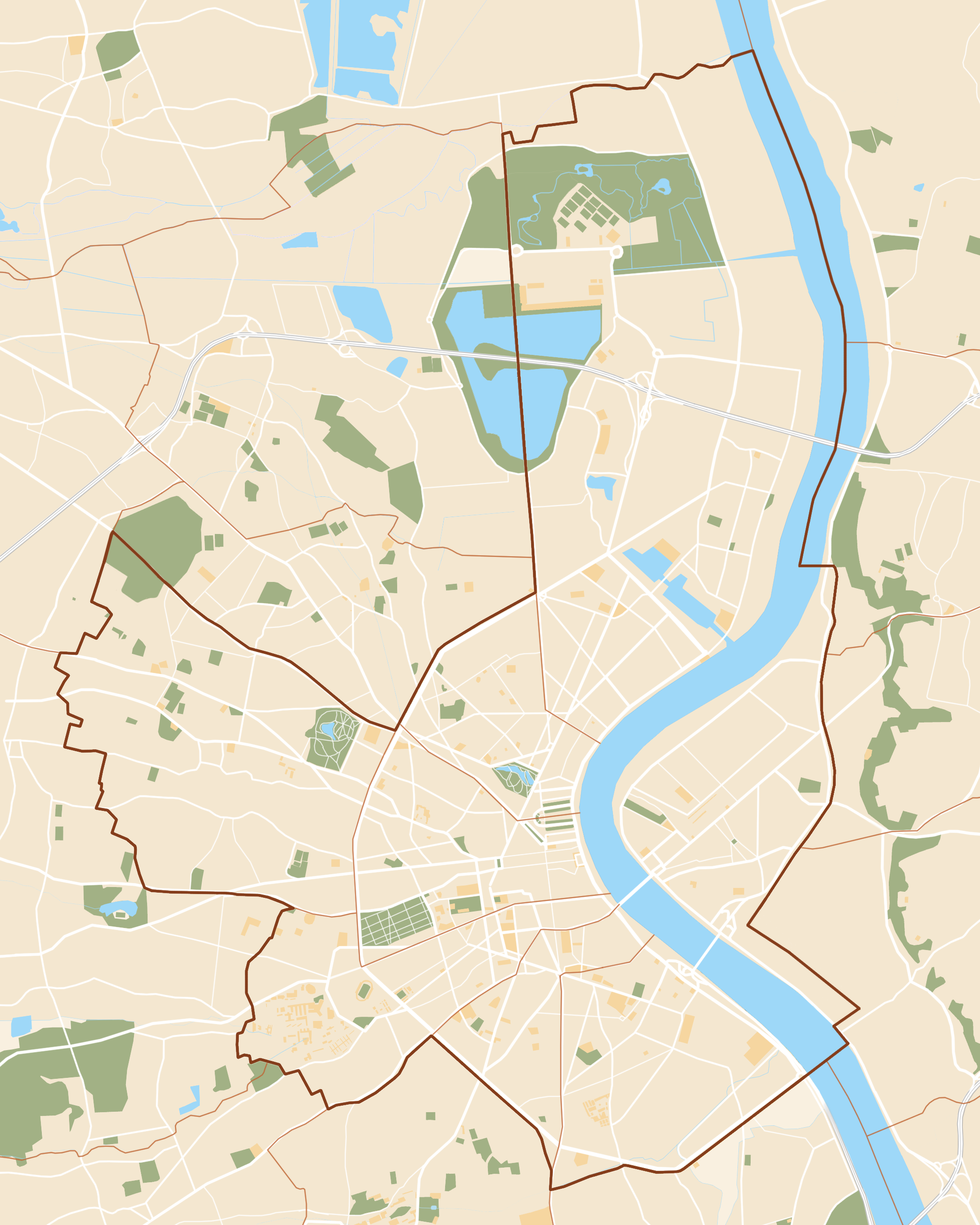
- Location within Bordeaux Location within Nouvelle-Aquitaine

New York tram stop is located on line B of the Tramway de Bordeaux. It opened on 20 October 2008, when the line was extended from Bassins à Flot to Claveau. The stop is located on Rue Achard in the city of Bordeaux and is operated by Transports Bordeaux Métropole.

For most of the day on Mondays to Fridays, trams run at least every five minutes in both directions. Services run less frequently in the early morning, late evenings, weekends and public holidays.

The tram stop has two tracks and two side platforms.

== Close by ==
- La Poste
- École Achard
