= Victoire tram stop =

Tram stop in Bordeaux, France

Victoire
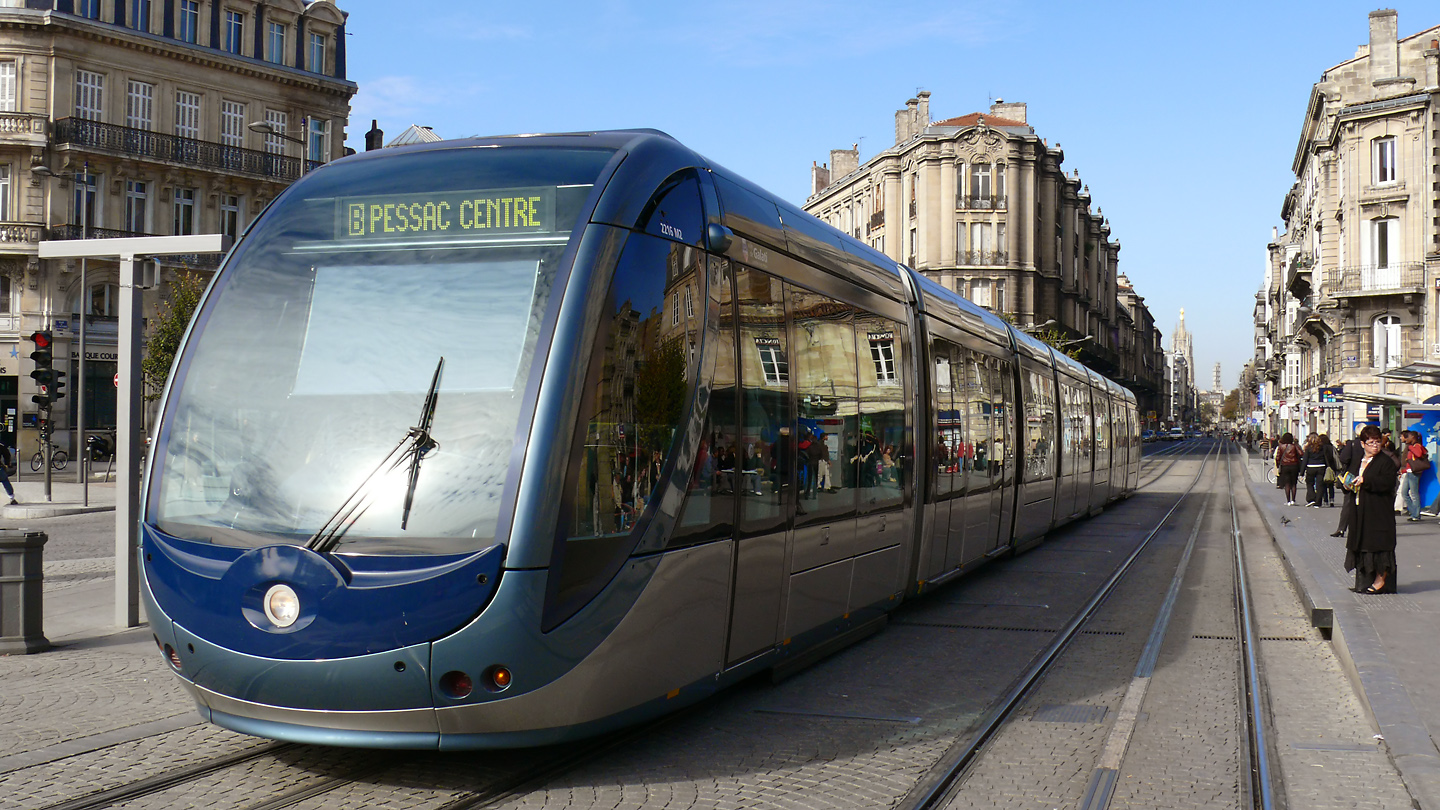
- A tram at the stop in 2007

General information
- Location: Bordeaux; France
- Coordinates: 44°49′52″N 0°34′23″W
- Line: Line B

Construction
- Architect: Elizabeth de Portzamparc

History
- Opened: 15 May 2004

Services
| Preceding station | Bordeaux tramway | Following station |
|---|---|---|
| Saint-Nicolas towards France Alouette or Pessac Centre | Line B | Musée d'Aquitaine towards Berges de la Garonne |
Location
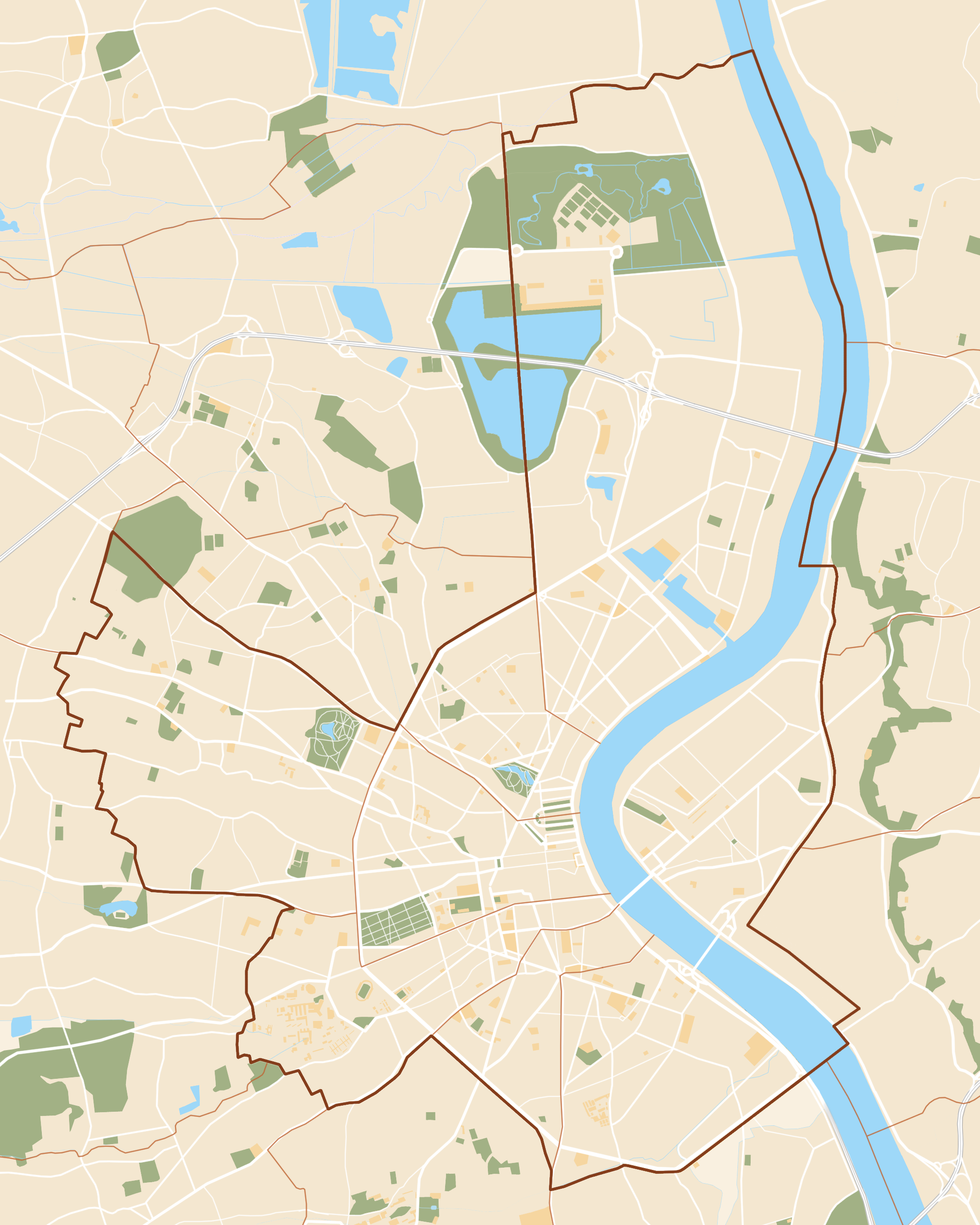
- Location within Bordeaux Location within Nouvelle-Aquitaine

Victoire tram stop is located on line of the tramway de Bordeaux.

== Situation ==
The station is located at the Place de la Victoire in Bordeaux.

== Interchanges ==
=== TBM bus network ===
| N. | Course | Link | Exploitant |
|---|---|---|---|
| 1 | Bordeaux-Gare Saint Jean <=> Mérignac-Centre. | 1 | TBM |
| 5 | Villenave-Piscine Chambéry <=> Bordeaux-Palais de Justice | 5 | TBM |
| 11 | Villenave-Courréjean <=> Martignas-Les Pins | 11 | TBM |
| 15 | Bordeaux-Centre commercial du Lac or Bruges-Camping international <=> Villenave-Courréjean or -Pont de la Maye | 15 | TBM |
| 20 | Bordeaux-Victoire <=> Talence-Thouars | 20 | TBM |
| 58 | Gradignan-Village 5 <=> Bordeaux-Base sous marine | TBNight | TBM |

=== TransGironde network ===
| N. | Course | Link |
|---|---|---|
| 701 | Gare Saint-Jean ou Sainte-Hélène-Bourg <=> Le Porge-Eglise ou -Océan | 701 |
| 702 | Gare Saint-Jean ou Mérignac Centre <=> Lacanau-Longarisse | 702 |

== Close by ==
- Place de la Victoire
- Bordeaux-II University
- South issue of rue Sainte-Catherine, known as the longest pedestrian street of Europe.
- Parking Victoire

== See also ==
- TBC
- Tramway de Bordeaux
