= Rue Achard tram stop =

Tram stop in Bordeaux, France

Rue Achard
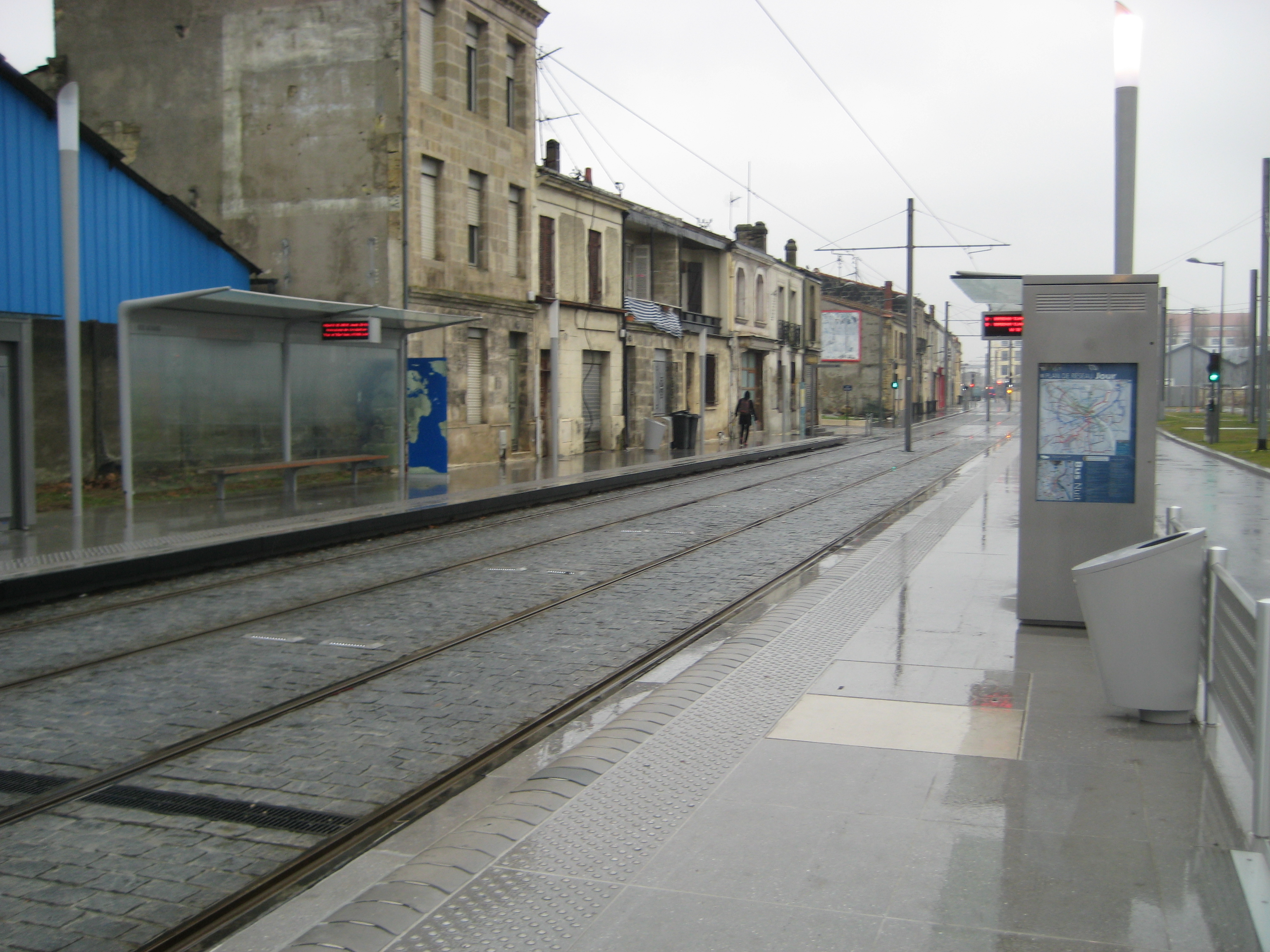
- The stop in 2009

General information
- Location: Bordeaux; France
- Coordinates: 44°52′00″N 0°32′55″W
- Line: Line B

History
- Opened: 20 October 2008

Services
Preceding station	Bordeaux tramway	Following station
La Cité du Vin towards France Alouette or Pessac Centre	Line B	New York towards Berges de la Garonne
Location
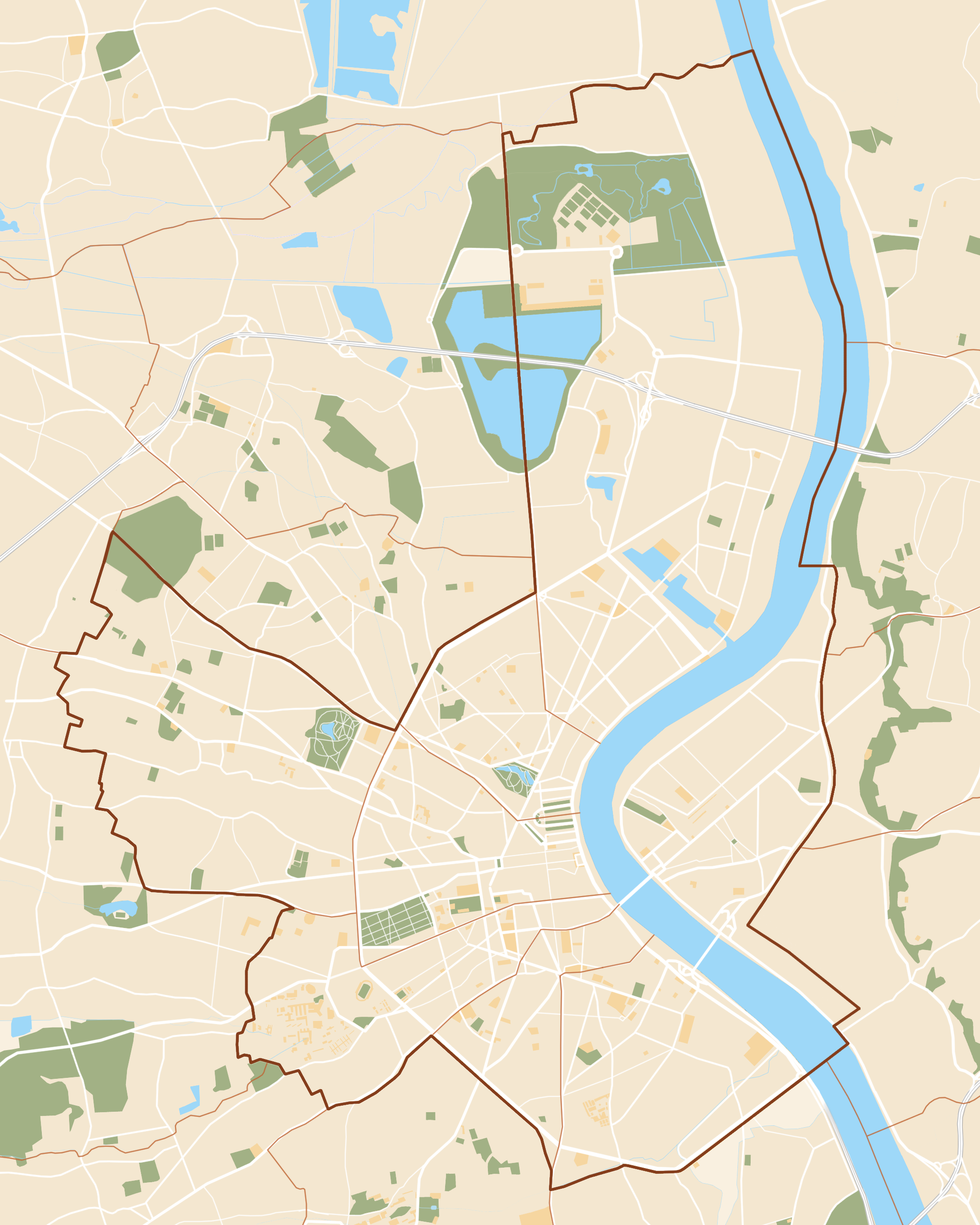
- Location within Bordeaux Location within Nouvelle-Aquitaine

Rue Achard tram stop is located on line B of the Tramway de Bordeaux. It opened on 20 October 2008, when the line was extended from Bassins à Flot to Claveau. The stop is located on Rue Achard in the city of Bordeaux and is operated by Transports Bordeaux Métropole.

For most of the day on Mondays to Fridays, trams run at least every five minutes in both directions. Services run less frequently in the early morning, late evenings, weekends and public holidays.

The tram stop has two tracks and two side platforms. Junctions to the north and south of the stop give access to the Rue Achard tram depot.

== Close by ==
- La Poste
- École Achard
