= Brandenburg tram stop =

Tram stop in Bordeaux, France

Brandenburg

General information
- Location: Bordeaux; France
- Coordinates: 44°52′28″N 0°32′44″W
- Line: Line B

History
- Opened: 20 October 2008

Services
Preceding station	Bordeaux tramway	Following station
New York towards France Alouette or Pessac Centre	Line B	Claveau towards Berges de la Garonne
Location
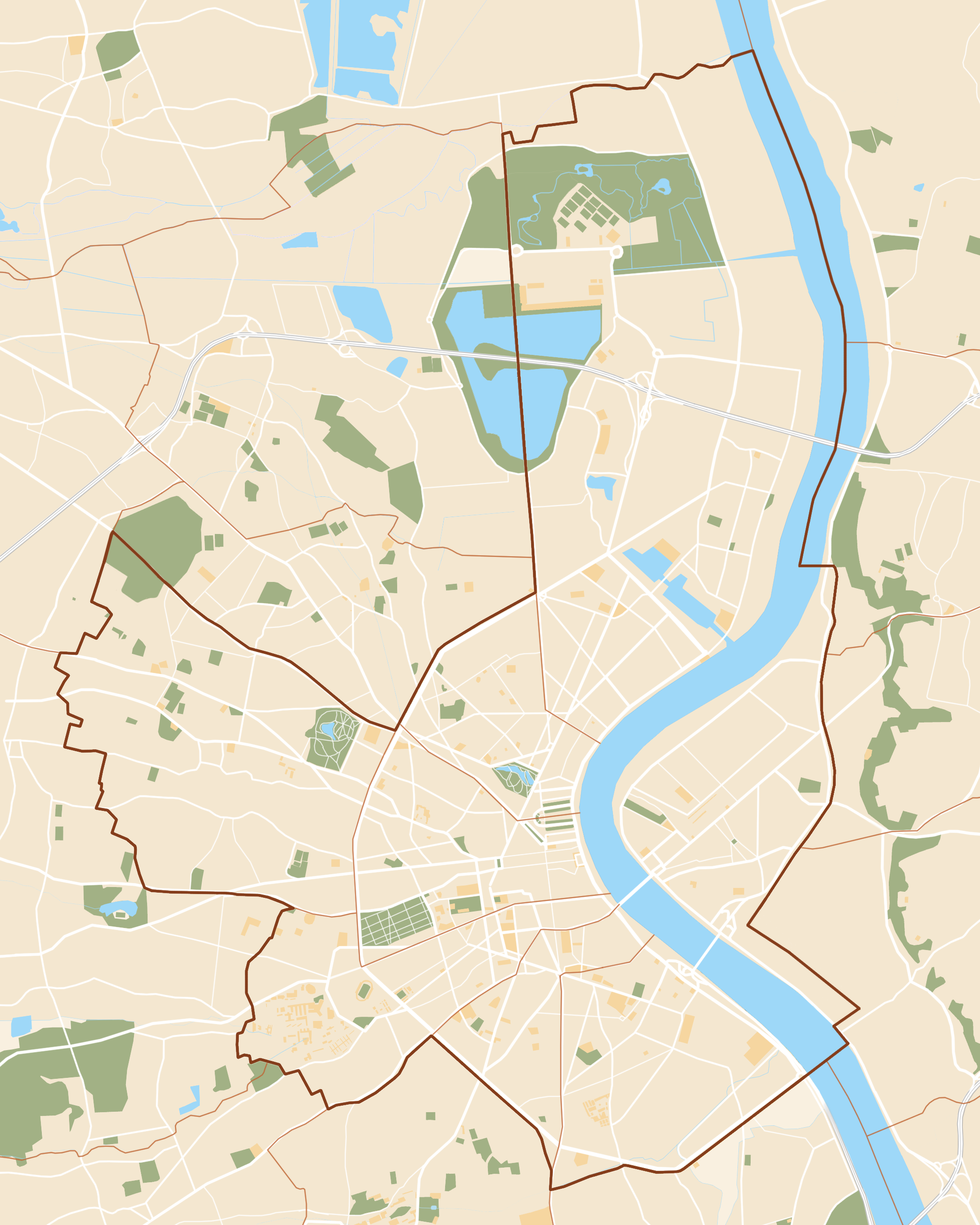
- Location within Bordeaux Location within Nouvelle-Aquitaine

Brandenburg tram stop is located on line B of the Tramway de Bordeaux. It opened on 20 October 2008, when the line was extended from Bassins à Flot to Claveau. The stop is located on Rue Joseph Brunet in the city of Bordeaux and is operated by Transports Bordeaux Métropole. For most of the day on Mondays to Fridays, trams run at least every five minutes in both directions. Services run less frequently in the early morning, late evenings, weekends and public holidays. The tram stop has two tracks and two side platforms.

== Interchanges ==
=== TBM bus network ===
N.	Course	Link	Exploitant
9	Bordeaux-Gare Saint Jean <=> Bordeaux-Brandenburg	9	TBM
25	Bordeaux-Brandenburg <=> Bordeaux-Parc des Expositions	25	TBM
76	Bordeaux-Brandenburg <=> Parempuyre-Landegrand	76	Kéolis Gironde

== Closed by ==
- Mairie du quartier
- La Poste
- Lidl
