= Lormont-Lauriers tram stop =

Tram station in Lormont, France

Lormont-Lauriers

General information
- Location: Lormont; France
- Coordinates: 44°52′45″N 0°31′04″W
- Line: Line A

History
- Opened: 21 December 2003

Services
Preceding station	Bordeaux tramway	Following station
Bois Fleuri towards Le Haillan Rostand	Line A	Mairie de Lormont towards La Gardette - Bassens - Carbon Blanc
Location
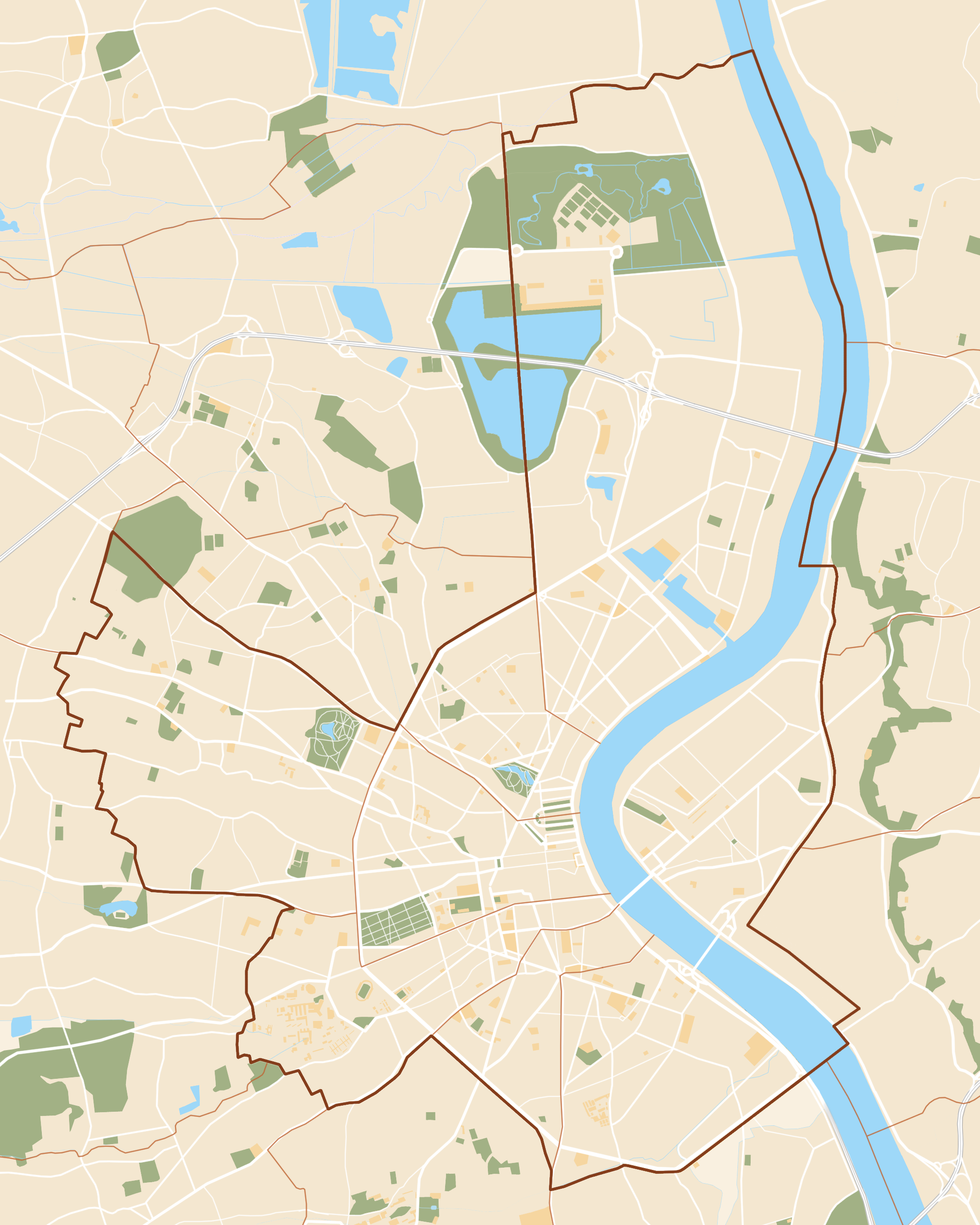
- Location within Bordeaux Location within Nouvelle-Aquitaine

Lormont-Lauriers tram stop is located on line A of the Tramway de Bordeaux, and served as terminus of the northern branch of that line between 21 December 2003, when the line opened, and 31 June 2008, when the branch was extended to La Gardette - Bassens - Carbon Blanc. The stop is located in the commune of Lormont and is operated by the TBC.

For most of the day on Mondays to Fridays, trams run every ten minutes in both directions through the stop. Services run less frequently in the early morning, late evenings, weekends and public holidays.

== Interchanges ==
- TBM bus network:

-	40	=> Cenon-Beausite or Lormont-Lauriers
