= La Morlette tram stop =

Tram station in Bordeaux, France

La Morlette

General information
- Location: Cenon; France
- Coordinates: 44°51′18″N 0°31′05″W
- Line: Line A

History
- Opened: 21 December 2003

Services
| Preceding station | Bordeaux tramway | Following station |
|---|---|---|
| Pelletan towards Le Haillan Rostand | Line A | Jean Zay towards Floirac Dravemont |
Location
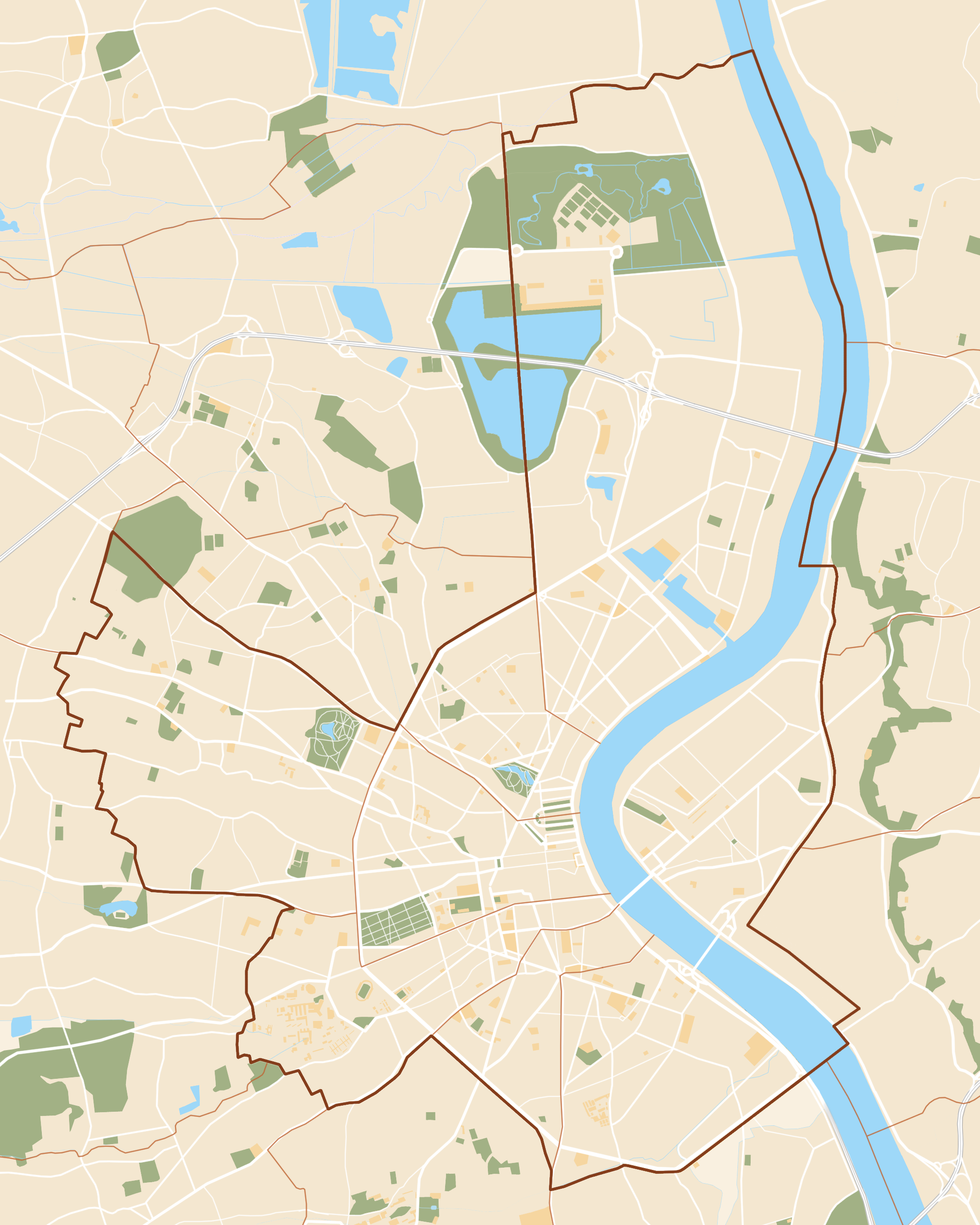
- Location within Bordeaux Location within Nouvelle-Aquitaine

La Morlette tram stop is located on line A of the Tramway de Bordeaux, and served as terminus of the southern branch of that line between 21 December 2003, when the line opened, and 27 February 2007, when the line was extended to Floirac Dravemont. The stop is located in the commune of Cenon and is operated by the TBC.

For most of the day on Mondays to Fridays, trams run every ten minutes in both directions through the stop. Services run less frequently in the early morning, late evenings, weekends and public holidays.

== Interchanges ==
- TBM bus network:

| - | 32 | Bouliac-Centre commercial <=> Cenon-Gare |
