= Palais de Justice tram stop =

Tram stop in Bordeaux, France

Palais de Justice

General information
- Location: Maréchal Juin Boulevard; Bordeaux; France
- Coordinates: 44°50′11″N 0°34′53″W
- Line: Line A

Construction
- Architect: Elizabeth de Portzamparc

History
- Opened: 21 December 2003

Services
Preceding station	Bordeaux tramway	Following station
Mériadeck towards Le Haillan Rostand	Line A	Hôtel de Ville towards La Gardette - Bassens - Carbon-Blanc or Floirac Dravemont
Location
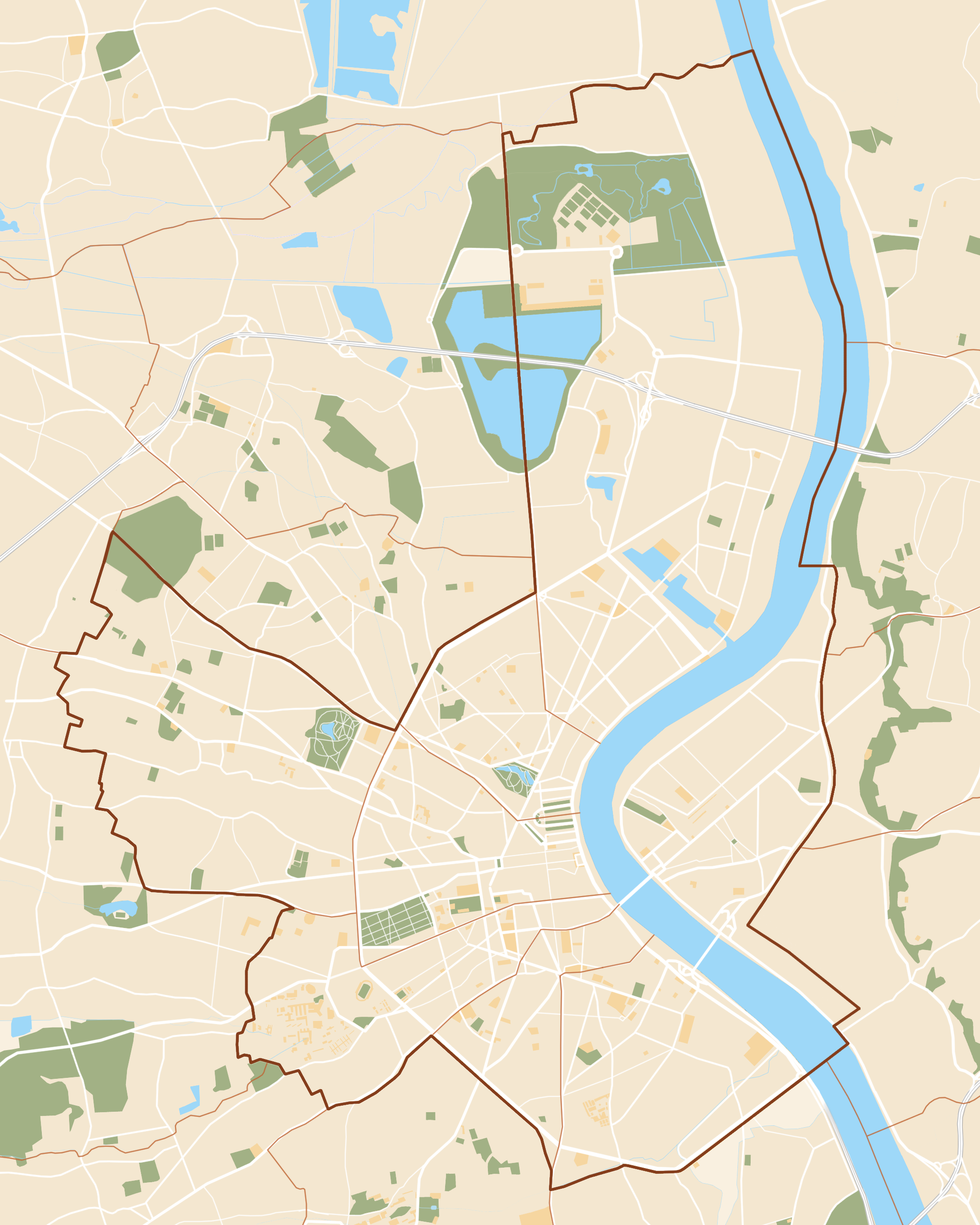
- Location within Bordeaux Location within Nouvelle-Aquitaine

The Palais de Justice tram stop is located on line of the tramway de Bordeaux.

== Situation ==
The station is located by Maréchal Juin Boulevard in Bordeaux. The change to ground-level power supply (APS) at this station allows an absence of overhead lines in downtown Bordeaux.

== Interchanges ==
- TBM bus network:

-	1	Bordeaux-Gare Saint Jean <=> Mérignac-Centre
-	4	Bordeaux-Bassins à Flots <=> Pessac-Magonty or -Cap de Bos
-	5	=> Villenave-Piscine Chambéry
-	12	=> Eysines-Hippodrome
-	15	Bordeaux-Centre commercial du Lac or Bruges-Camping international <=> Villenave-Courréjean or -Pont de la Maye
-	16	Bouliac-Centre commercial <=> Mérignac-Les Pins

== Close by ==
- Palais de Justice, the old building (Place de la République) and the new one (modern architecture; designed by Richard Rogers)
- Château du Hâ
- École nationale de la magistrature, National School for Judges
- Hôpital Saint-André (CHU de Bordeaux), Bordeaux University Hospital

== See also ==
- TBC
- Tramway de Bordeaux
