= Saint-Augustin tram stop =

Tram station in Bordeaux, France

Saint-Augustin

General information
- Location: Bordeaux; France
- Coordinates: 44°49′44″N 0°36′37″W
- Line: Line A

History
- Opened: 26 September 2005

Services
Preceding station	Bordeaux tramway	Following station
Hôpital Pellegrin towards Le Haillan Rostand	Line A	François Mitterrand towards La Gardette - Bassens - Carbon-Blanc or Floirac Dravemont
Location
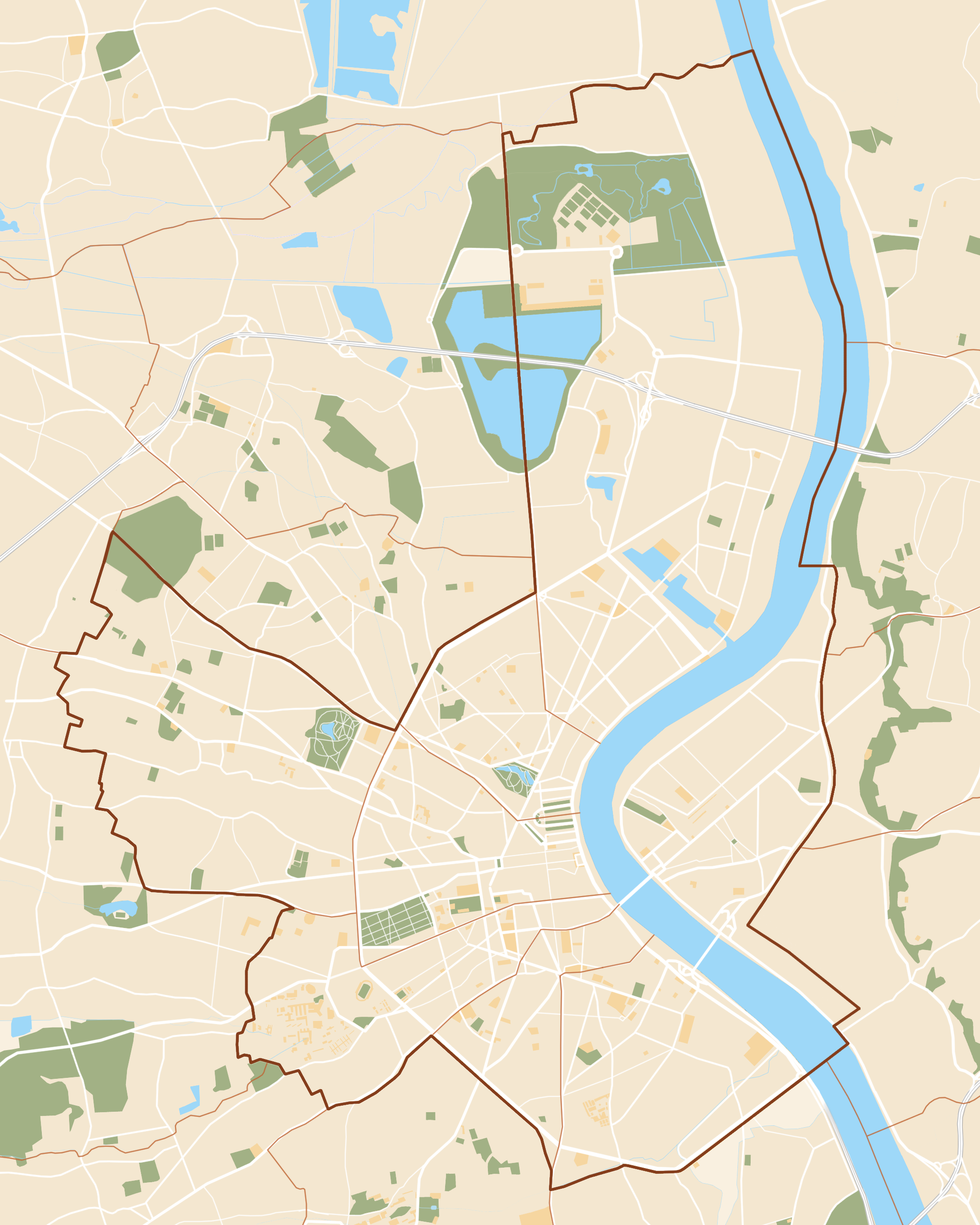
- Location within Bordeaux Location within Nouvelle-Aquitaine

Saint-Augustin tram stop (French pronunciation: [sɛ̃t‿oɡystɛ̃]) is located on line A of the Tramway de Bordeaux, and served as terminus of that line between 26 September 2005, when the line was extended from Mériadeck, until 21 June 2007, when the line was extended to Mérignac Centre. The stop is located in the commune of Bordeaux and is operated by the TBC.

For most of the day on Mondays to Fridays, trams run at least every five minutes in both directions through the stop. Services run less frequently in the early morning, late evenings, weekends and public holidays.

== Interchanges ==
- TBM bus network:

-	41	Le Bouscat-Hippodrome <=> Bordeaux-Pelouse de Douet
