= Mériadeck tram stop =

Tram station in Bordeaux, France

Mériadeck
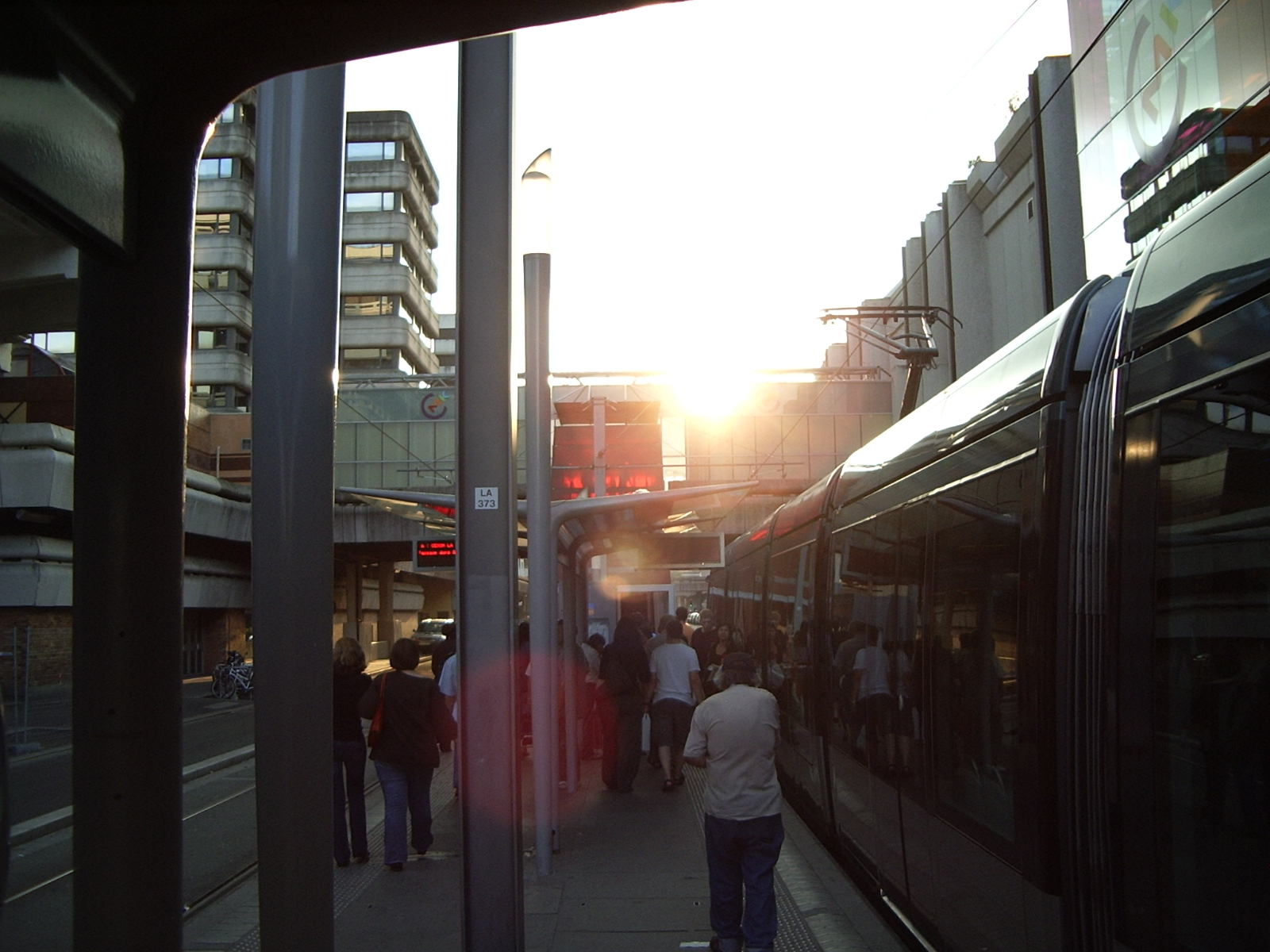

General information
- Location: Bordeaux; France
- Coordinates: 44°50′17″N 0°35′04″W
- Line: Line A

History
- Opened: 21 December 2003

Services
| Preceding station | Bordeaux tramway | Following station |
|---|---|---|
| St Bruno - Hôtel de Région towards Le Haillan Rostand | Line A | Palais de Justice towards La Gardette - Bassens - Carbon-Blanc or Floirac Dravemont |
Location
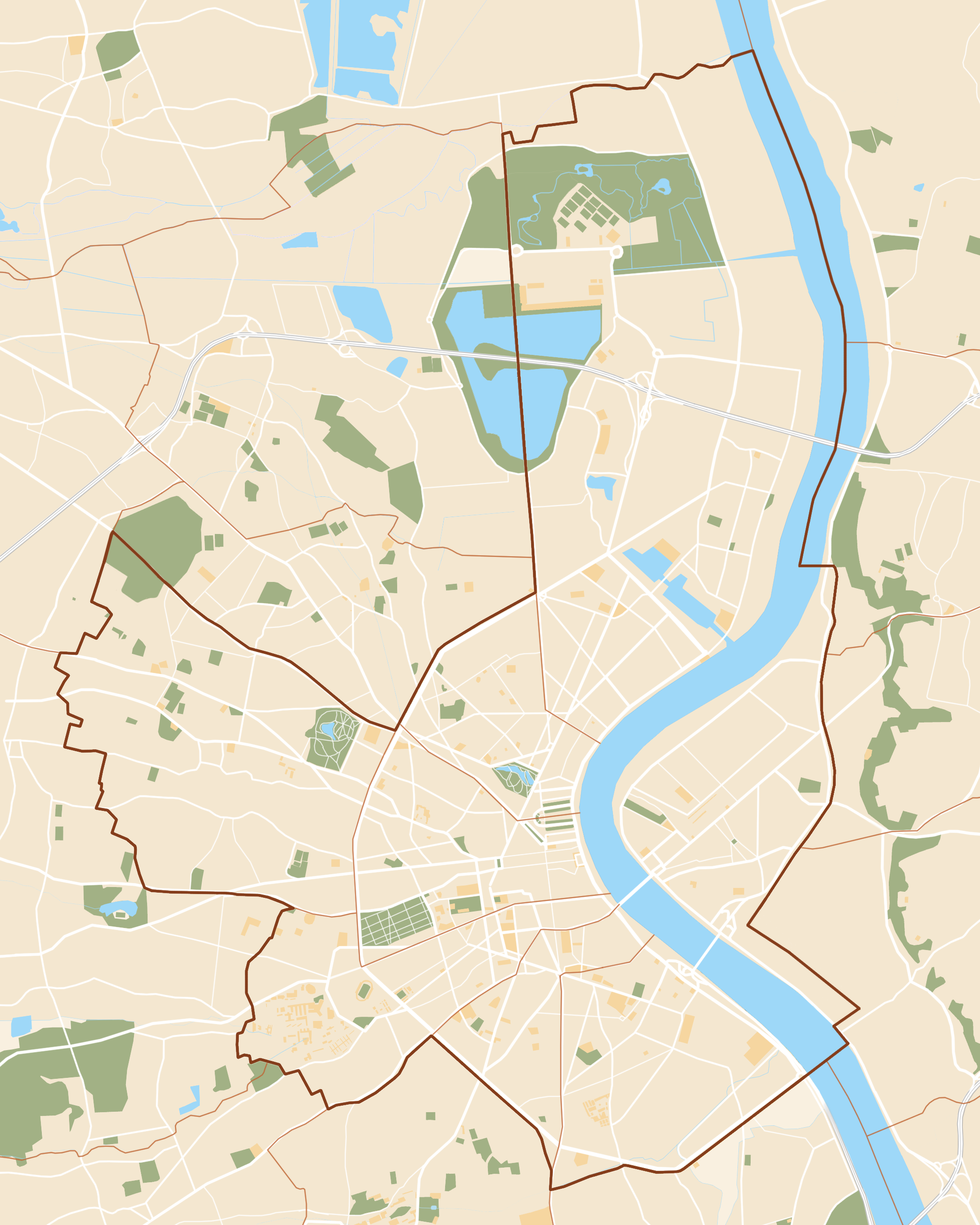
- Location within Bordeaux Location within Nouvelle-Aquitaine

Mériadeck tram stop is located on line A of the Tramway de Bordeaux, and served as terminus of that line between 21 December 2003, when the line opened, and 26 September 2005, when the line was extended to Saint-Augustin. The stop is located in the commune of Bordeaux and is operated by the TBC.

For most of the day on Mondays to Fridays, trams run at least every five minutes in both directions through the stop. Services run less frequently in the early morning, late evenings, weekends and public holidays.
