= Hôtel de Ville, Cenon =

Town hall in Cenon, France

Hôtel de Ville
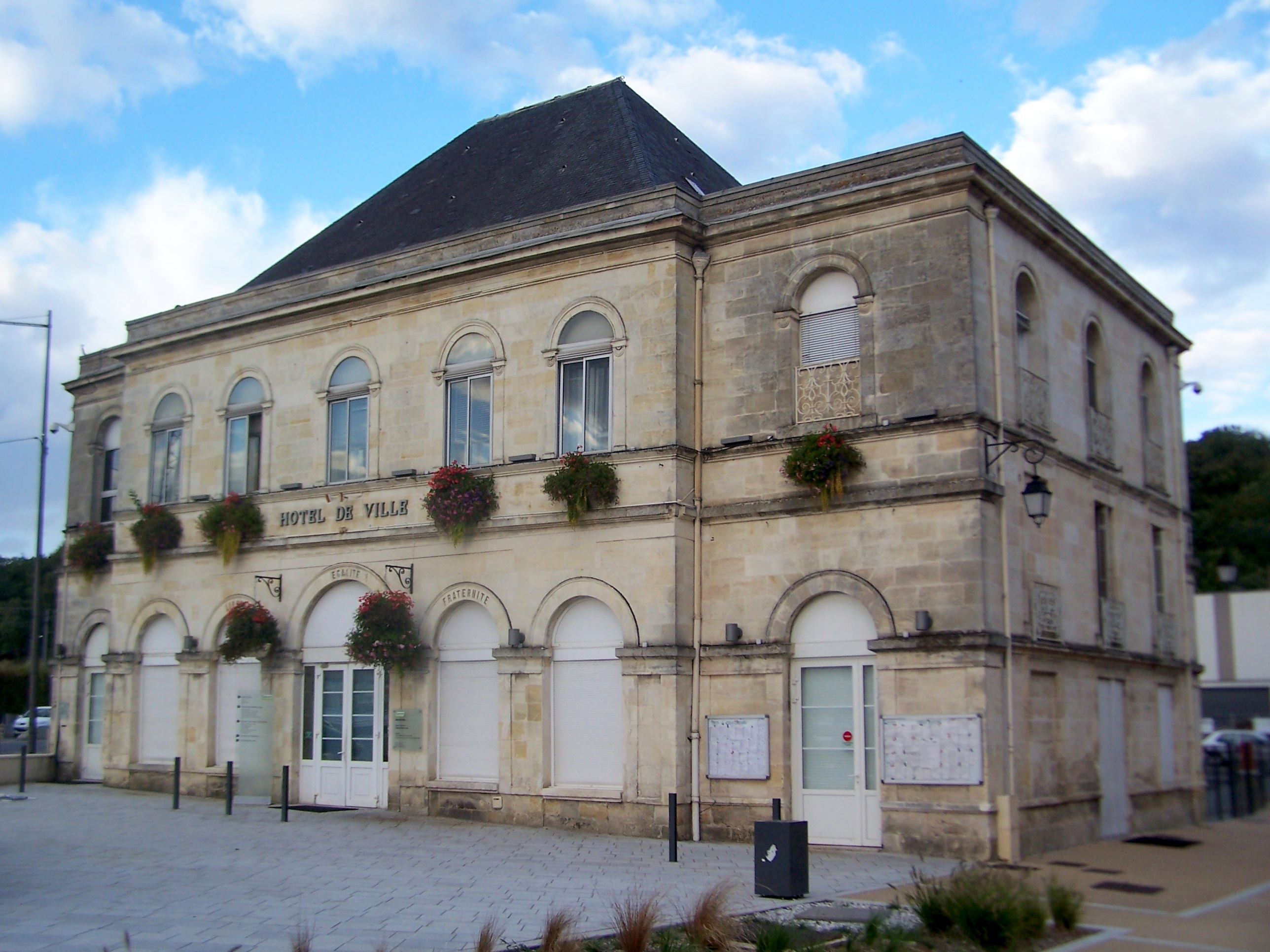
- The main frontage of the Hôtel de Ville in September 2015
- Interactive map of the Hôtel de Ville area

General information
- Type: City hall
- Architectural style: Italianate style
- Location: Cenon, France
- Coordinates: 44.8577°N 0.5310°W
- Completed: c.1824

The Hôtel de Ville (French pronunciation: [otɛl də vil], City Hall) is a municipal building in Cenon, Gironde, in southwestern France, standing on Avenue Carnot.

== History ==
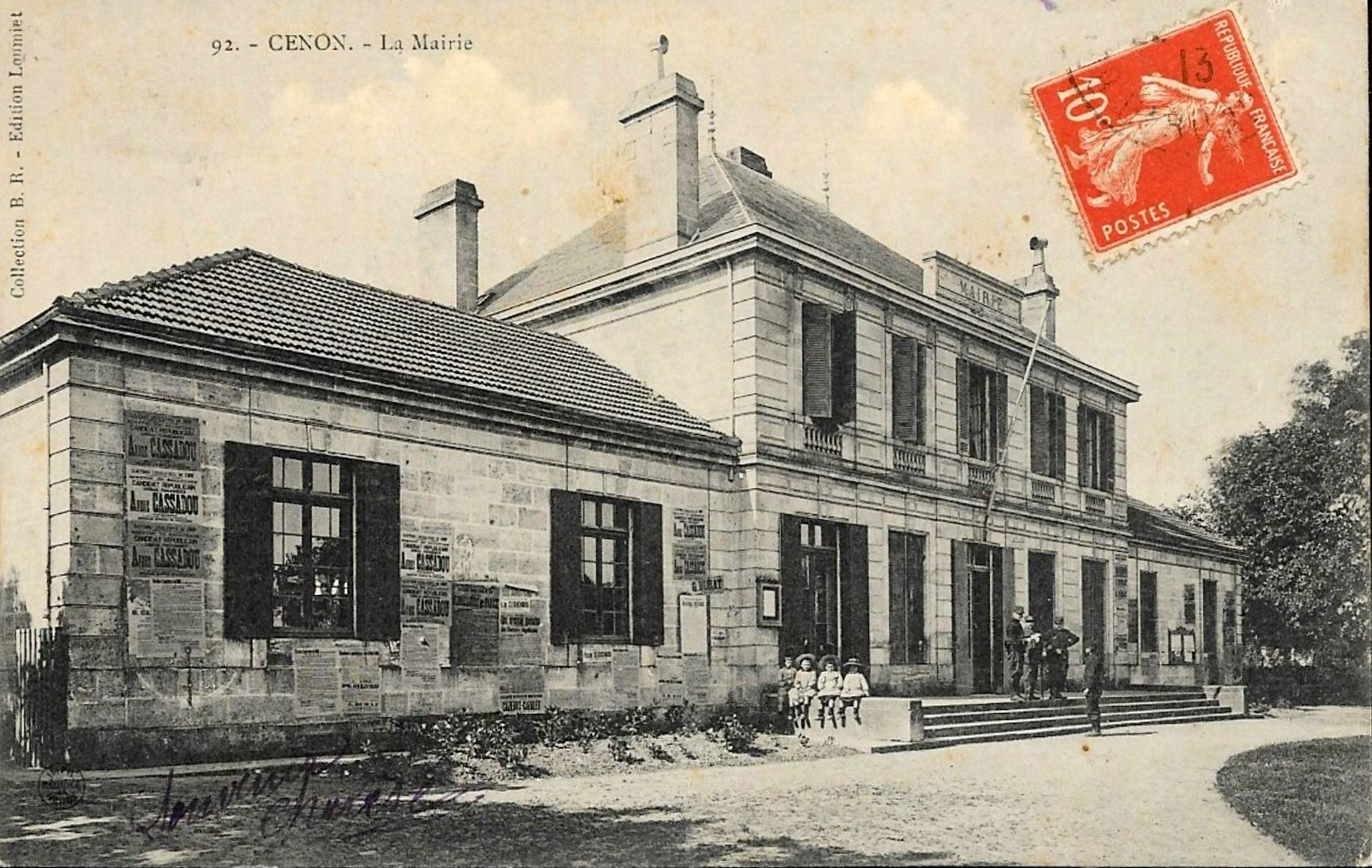
The old town hall, now the École des Cavailles

Following the French Revolution, the town council initially met in the house of the mayor at the time. This arrangement continued until the mid-19th century when the town council decided to establish a municipal building. The site they selected was at the top of Côte de l'Empereur (Emperor's Hill) on the Bellefonds Estate. The building, which accommodated a girls' school, was completed in January 1865.

In the early 1870s, after finding the first building too cramped, the council led by the mayor, Michel Monerie, decided to commission a more substantial combined town hall and school. The site they selected was on the south side of what is now Rue Professeur Calmette. The new building was designed in the neoclassical style, built in ashlar stone and was completed in 1876. The design involved a symmetrical main frontage of nine bays facing onto the street. It was laid out as a two-storey central block of five bays and a pair of wings of two bays each. The central block contained the municipal office, while the left-hand wing accommodated the boys' school and the right-hand wing accommodated the girls' school. After the council vacated the building, it was exclusively used for educational purposes and continued to operate as the École des Cavailles.

In the early 20th century, following significant population growth, the council led by the mayor, Ulysse Massias, decided to establish a dedicated town hall. The building they selected was the Château Guithon on what is now Avenue Carnot. The building was commissioned as a private residence for the Guithon family. It was designed in the Italianate style, built in ashlar stone and dated back at least to 1824. The Guithons were a family of wealthy wine merchants operating their business from Rue Sainte-Catherine in Bordeaux. The local historian, Franck Depayre, claimed that Napoleon III rested in the main reception room (now the mayor's parlour) as he passed through the town in October 1852. By the second half of 19th century, Antoine Guithon was running the business in Bordeaux and living in the house in Cenon. After Antoine died in 1894, his son, Maurice, took over the business. By 1910, the house was in the hands of Crédit Foncier de France who sold it to the council in December 1913.

The design involved a symmetrical main frontage of seven bays facing onto the street. The central bay featured a round-headed doorway. The building was fenestrated by round headed windows with moulded surrounds on both floors and there was originally a dormer window above the central bay. The outer bays were slightly recessed and the north elevation was canted outwards at the back. Following conversion works, the principal rooms were the main reception room (now the mayor's parlour) and, later, the Salle du Conseil (council chamber).
