= La Gardette - Bassens - Carbon Blanc tram stop =

Tram station in Lormont, France

La Gardette - Bassens - Carbon Blanc
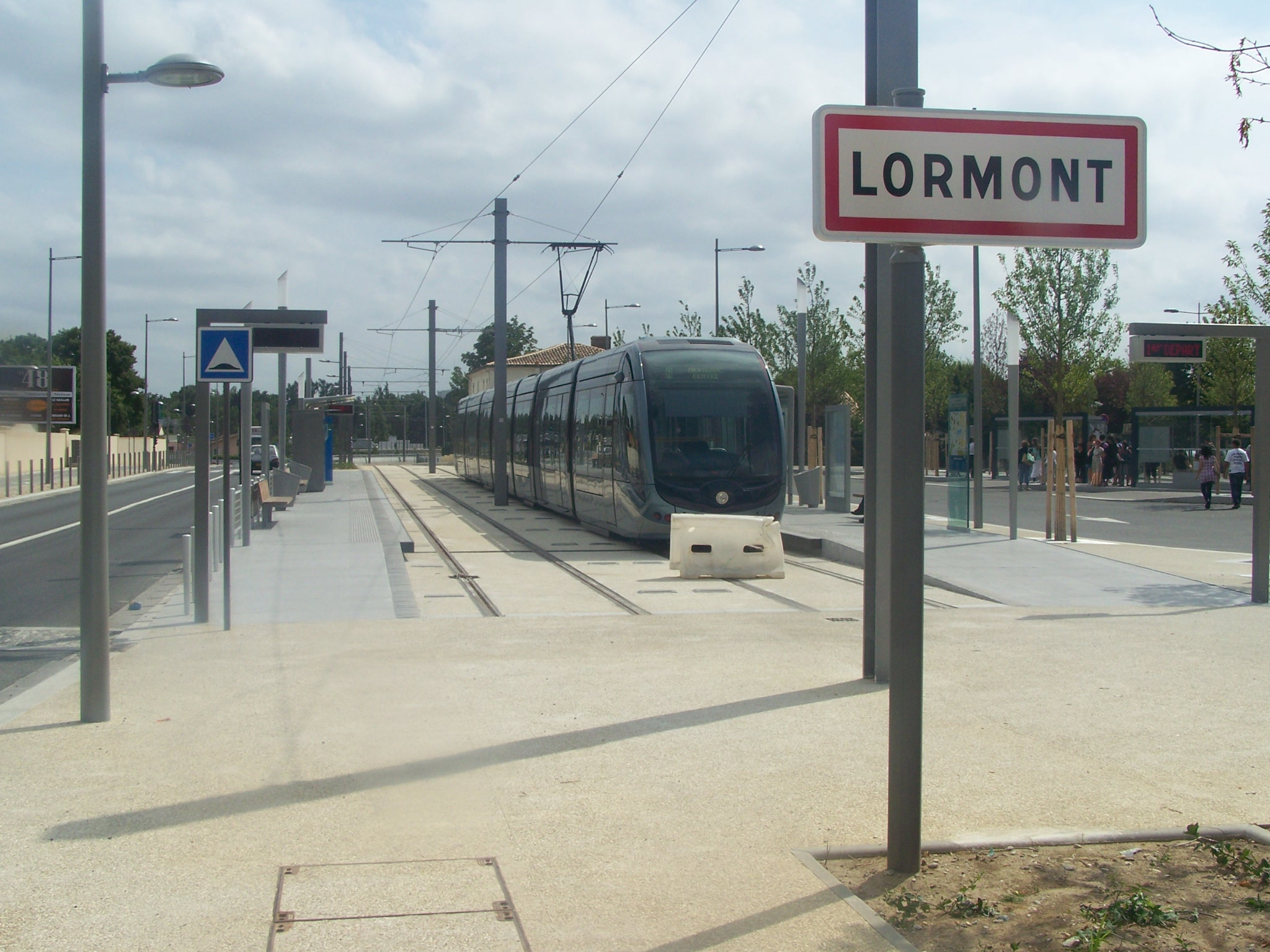

General information
- Location: Lormont; France
- Coordinates: 44°53′16″N 0°31′02″W
- Line: Line A

History
- Opened: 30 June 2008

Services
Preceding station	Bordeaux tramway	Following station
Carriet towards Le Haillan Rostand	Line A	Terminus
Location
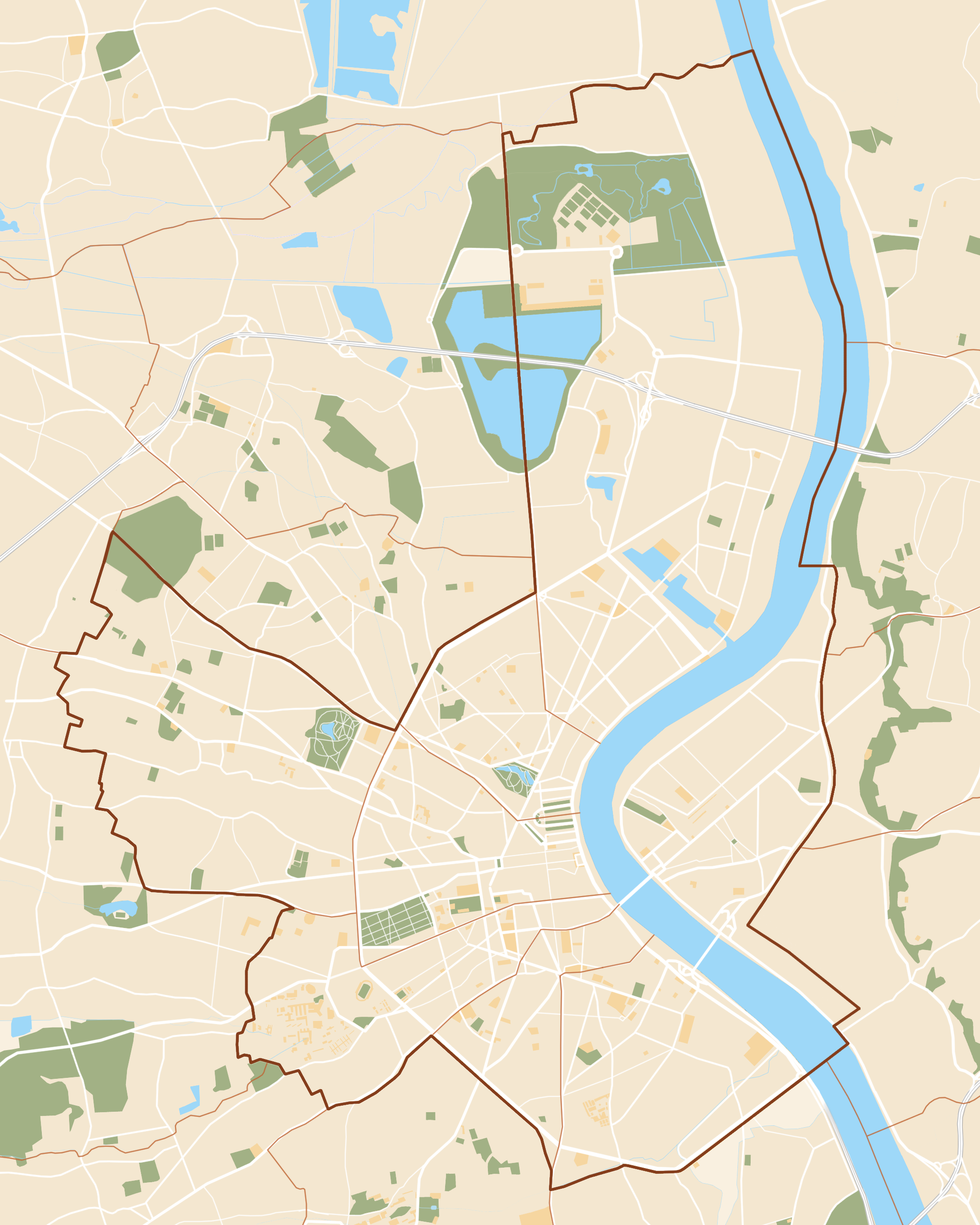
- Location within Bordeaux Location within Nouvelle-Aquitaine

La Gardette - Bassens - Carbon Blanc tram stop is the terminus of the northern branch of line A of the Tramway de Bordeaux. It opened on 30 June 2008, when the line was extended from Lormont-Lauriers . The stop is located in the commune of Lormont and is operated by the TBC.

For most of the day on Mondays to Fridays, trams run every ten minutes in both directions through the stop. Services run less frequently in the early morning, late evenings, weekends and public holidays.

== Interchanges ==
- TBM bus network:

-	7	Bordeaux-Centre commercial du Lac <=> Ambarès-Parabelle or -Quinsus
-	90	Bassens-La Chênaie <=> Saint-Louis-Belle Rive
