= Gare Pessac Alouette tram stop =

Tram stop in Pessac, France

Gare Pessac Alouette

General information
- Location: Pessac; France
- Coordinates: 44°47′36″N 0°39′28″W
- Line: Line B

History
- Opened: April 2015

Services
Preceding station	Bordeaux tramway	Following station
France Alouette Terminus	Line B	Hôpital Haut-Lévêque towards Berges de la Garonne
Location
- Location within Nouvelle-Aquitaine Location within France

Gare Pessac Alouette tram stop is a tram stop on the Pessac Alouette branch of line B of the Bordeaux tramway, and is located in the commune of Pessac. It is situated some 150 metres (490 ft) from Alouette-France railway station, to which it is linked by footpaths. The stop was inaugurated in April 2015, when a second branch of line B was opened from Bougnard to France Alouette. The stop is operated by Transports Bordeaux Métropole.

For most of the day on Mondays to Fridays, trams run at least every ten minutes in both directions. Services run less frequently in the early morning, late evenings, weekends and public holidays.
