= La Cité du Vin tram stop =

Tram stop in Bordeaux, France

La Cité du Vin
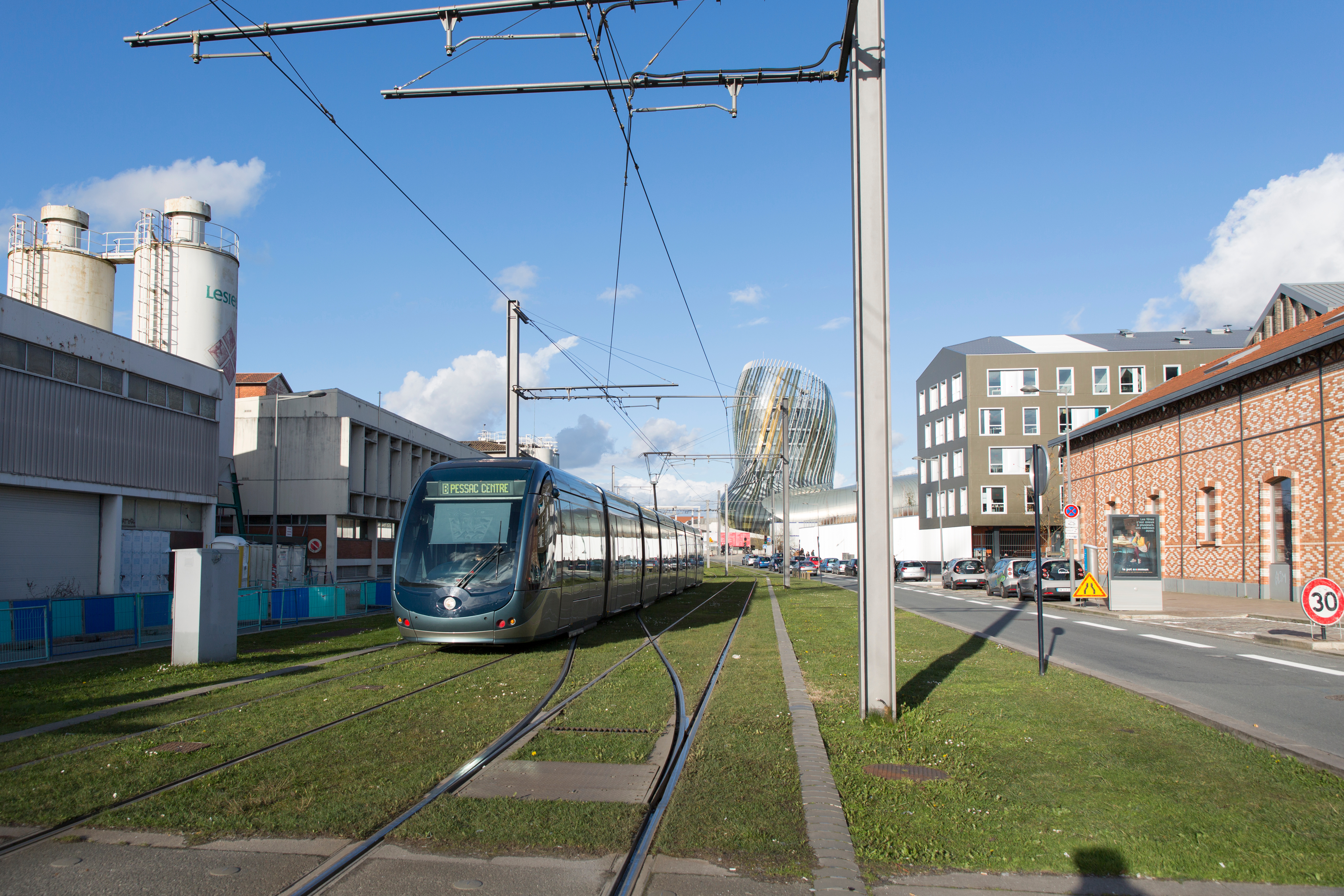
- View from the Cité du Vin tram stop looking north

General information
- Location: Bordeaux; France
- Coordinates: 44°51′39″N 0°33′12″W
- Line: Line B

History
- Opened: 27 July 2007
- Former names: Bassins à Flot

Services
Preceding station	Bordeaux tramway	Following station
Les Hangars towards France Alouette or Pessac Centre	Line B	Rue Achard towards Berges de la Garonne
Location
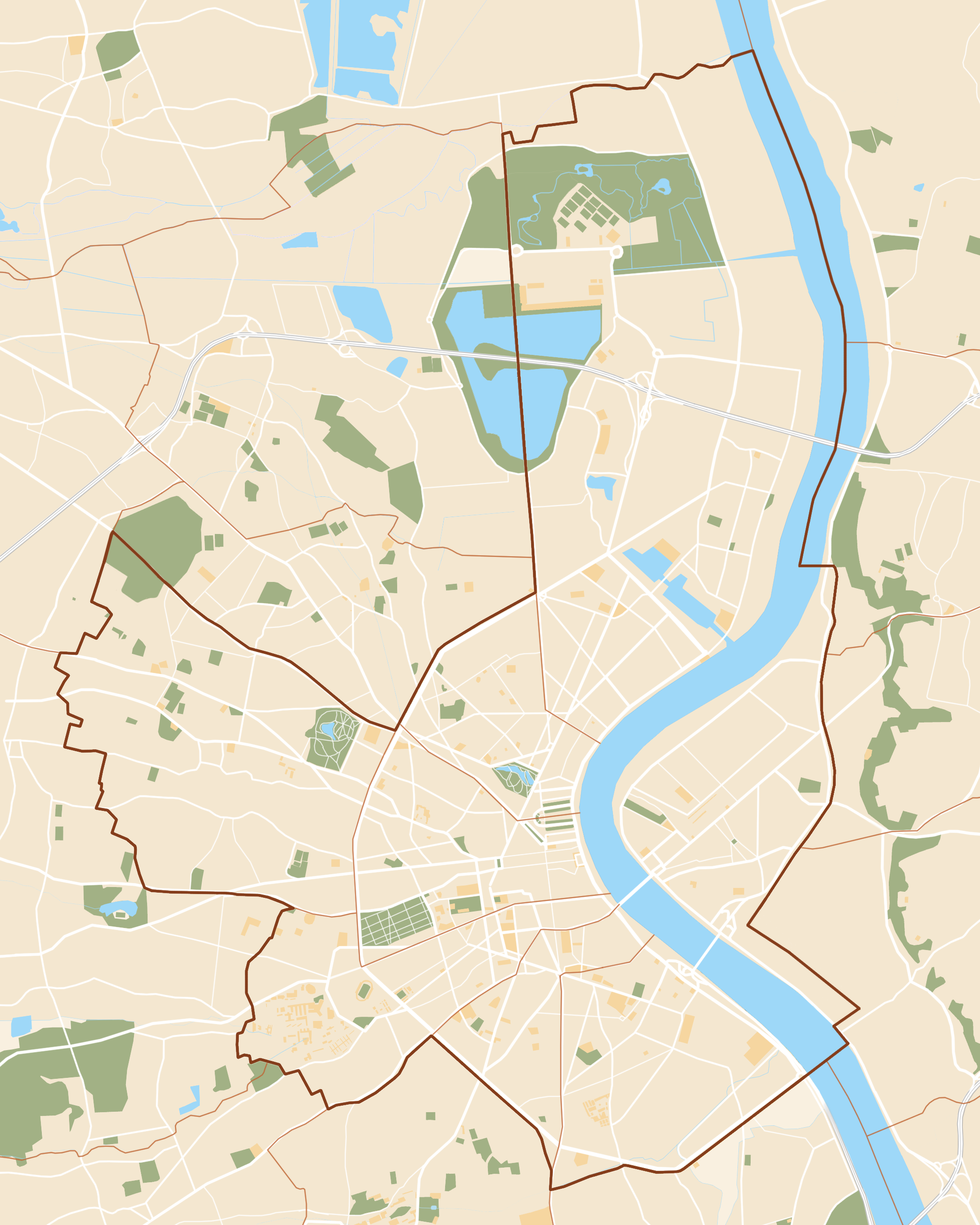
- Location within Bordeaux Location within Nouvelle-Aquitaine

La Cité du Vin tram stop is located on line B of the Tramway de Bordeaux. The stop is located on Quay Bacalan in the commune of Bordeaux and is operated by Transports Bordeaux Métropole. Initially known as Bassins à Flot tram stop, it opened on 27 July 2007 when line B was extended from Quinconces and served as terminus of that line until 20 October 2008, when the line was extended to Claveau.

The tram stop was originally named after the nearby Bassins à flot dock. It gained its current name in May 2016 with the opening of the adjacent Cité du Vin wine museum and tourist attraction. Just north of the tram stop, the line crosses over the entrance lock to the Bassins à flot, with trams normally using a route over a swing bridge at the downstream end of the lock, but with an alternative route available via the other end of the lock if the main bridge is swung open. The tram stop has two tracks and two side platforms.

For most of the day on Mondays to Fridays, trams run at least every five minutes in both directions. Services run less frequently in the early morning, late evenings, weekends and public holidays.

== Interchanges ==
=== TBM bus network ===
N.	Course	Link	Exploitant
7	Bordeaux-Centre commercial du Lac <=> Ambarès-Parabelle or -Quinsus	7	TBM
32	Bouliac-Centre commercial <=> Cenon-Gare	32	Citram Aquitaine
45	Le Bouscat-Place Ravezies <=> Bouliac-Centre commercial or -La Belle Etoile	45	TBM
58	Gradignan-Village 5 <=> Bordeaux-Base sous marine	TBNight	TBM

== Close by ==
- CAP Sciences
- FRAC Aquitaine
