= Charles Lacoste =

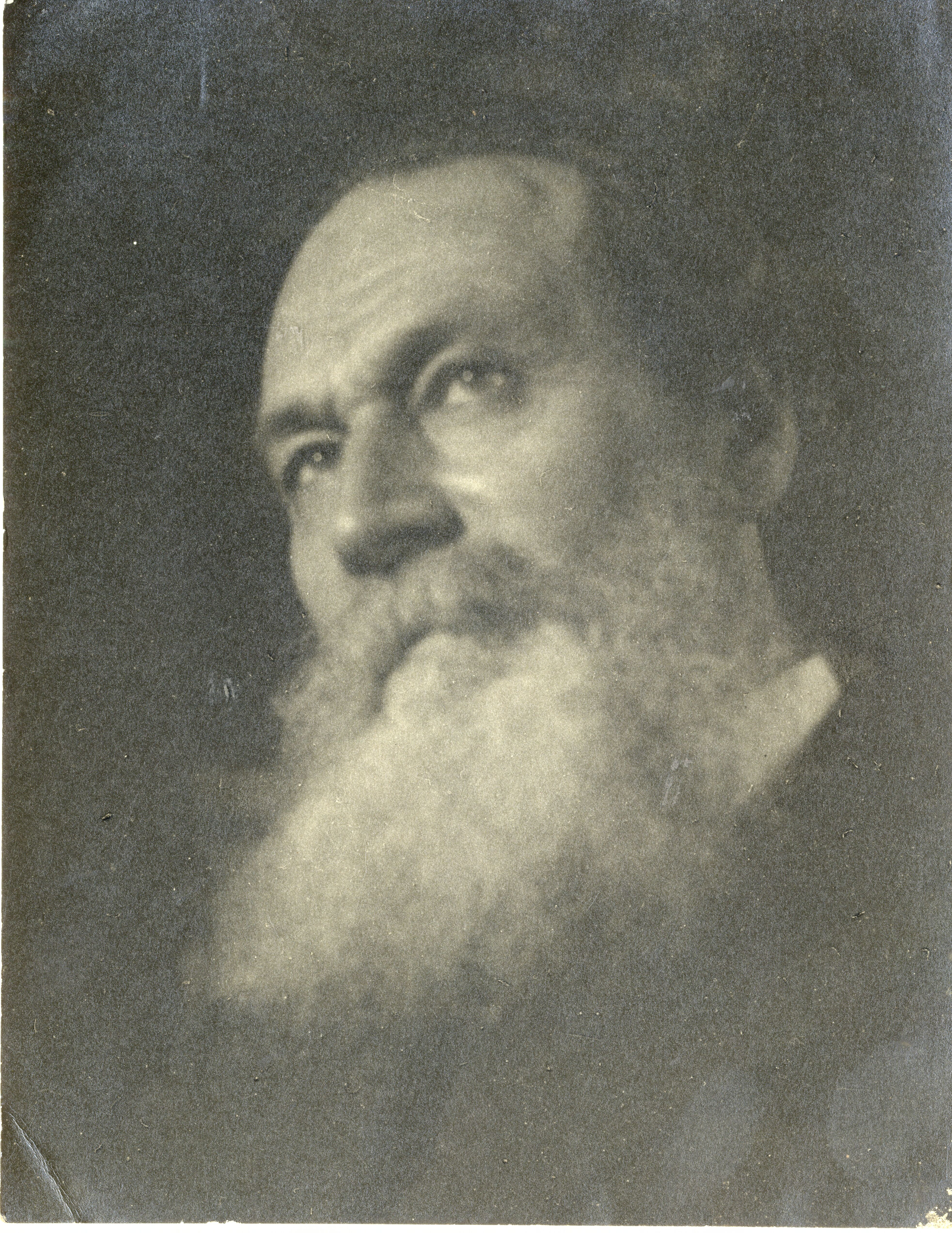
Portrait of Charles Lacoste

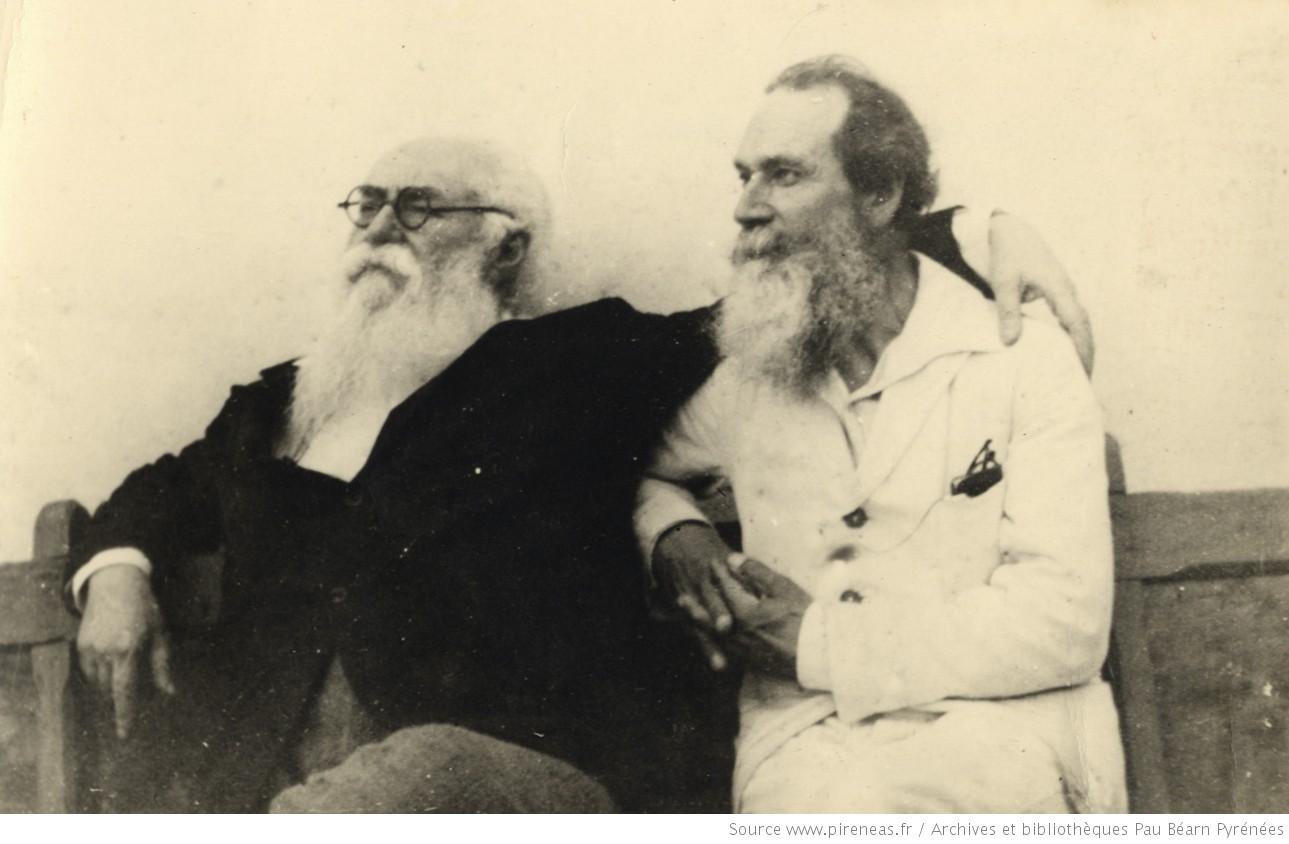
Francis Jammes amd Charles Lacoste 1933

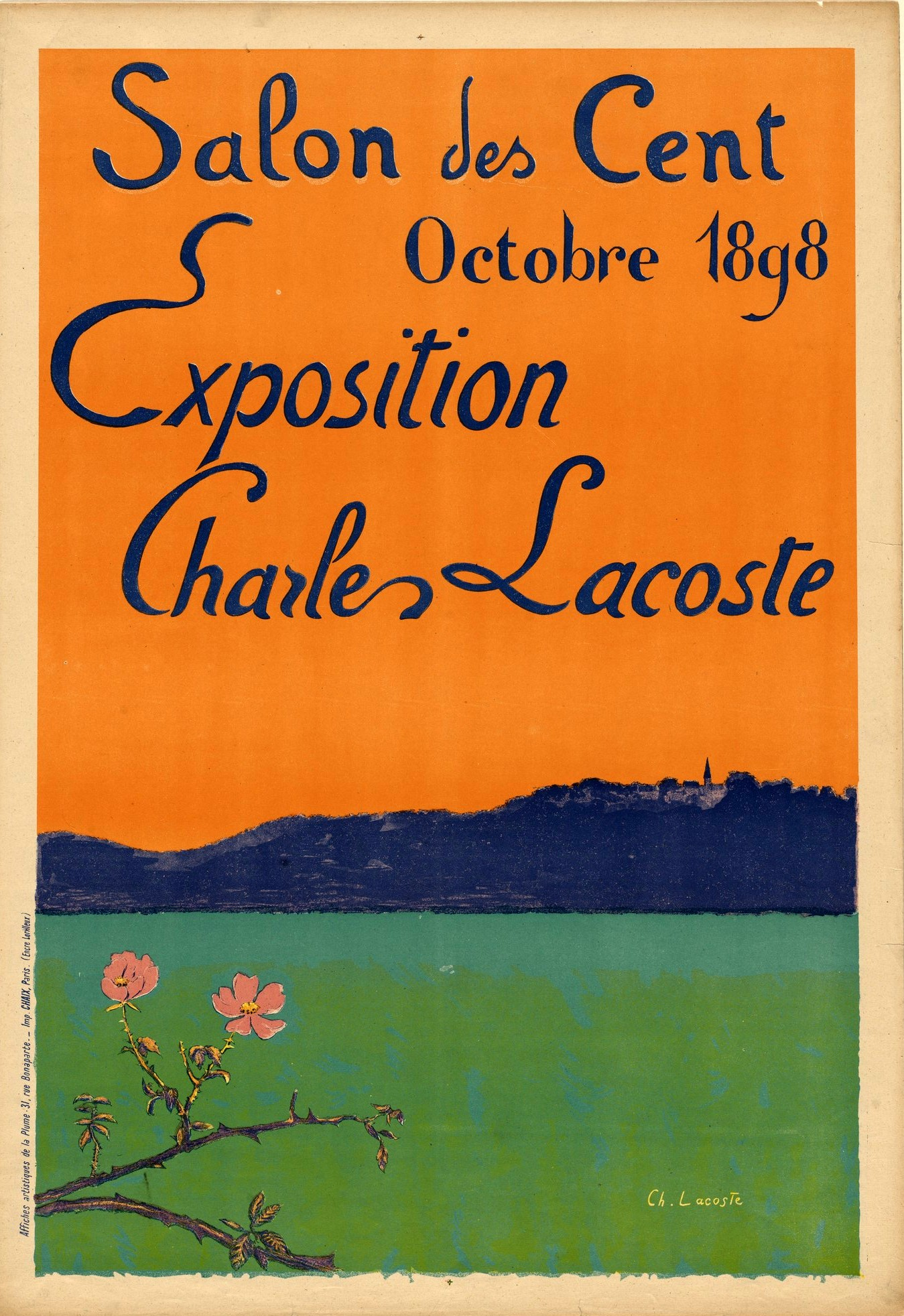
Salon des Cent - Exposition Charles Lacoste October 1898

Charles Lacoste (born 3 March 1870, Floirac, Gironde, died 1 March 1959, Paris) was a French painter, designer and illustrator. He is often associated with the group of artists known as the nabis.

== Biography ==
Lacoste was the son of a Bordeaux accountant and a Creole mother. While he was at high school he met the future poet Francis Jammes and fr:Gabriel Frizeau, a collector of works by Odilon Redon, Eugène Carrière, Adolphe Monticelli, Georges Rouault and Paul Gauguin. Lacoste was largely self-taught. From 1894 to 1897, he had several important encounters: André Gide, fr:Arthur Fontaine, the Rouart brothers, and the composer Henri Duparc.

Rejected by the Society of Friends of the Arts in Bordeaux, he made his public debut in 1898 at the Salon de La Plume, a journal that had just published his article "Simplicity in Painting", and then exhibited in October at the Salon des Cent. He settled in Paris and from 1901 to 1914 exhibited at the Salon des Indépendants. A founding member of the Salon d'Automne, he also exhibited at the Salon de la Libre Esthétique in Brussels in 1907 and the Salon de la Toison d'Or in Moscow in 1908.

Charles Lacoste lived in Monein, then in Pardies, where a street and the local primary school bear his name. He is buried in the Pardies cemetery. A bronze statue of him by the sculptor Nicolas Kennett has stood the Place Carreño in Pardies since 1992.

== Works ==
The Musée d'Orsay in Paris holds fifteen of his works. Other works include:

- ”April in Saint-Cloud”, fr: Musée Léon-Dierx.
- ”Flowering Chestnut Trees in Paris”, 1900, Musée des Beaux-Arts de Brest
- ”Dappled sky over the city”, 1903, Musée des Beaux-Arts de Brest
- ”Late winter sun in the new districts of Paris”, 1905, on loan from the Museum of Modern Art, Gray (Haute-Saône), Baron-Martin Museum
- ”Study of Clouds”, 1897, Dieppe Museum
- ”Abyss - Cliffs of Obeval”, 1902, Dieppe Museum
- “ Paysage de neige à Paris”, 1918 & “ Fontaine, place de la Concorde”, 1931 - Musée d’art moderne André Malraux - MuMa, Le Havre
