= Canton of Cenon =

Coordinates: 44.86°N 0.52°W

- Canton
- Location of the canton of Cenon in the Gironde department.
- Country: France
- Region: Nouvelle-Aquitaine
- Department: Gironde
- No. of communes: {{{nbcomm}}}
- Established: 1973

Government
  - Representatives (2021–2028): Nathalie Lacuey; Jean-François Égron
- Area: 21.67 km^{2} (8.37 sq mi)
- Population (2023): 48,938
  - Density: 2,258/km^{2} (5,849/sq mi)
- INSEE code: 33 09

The canton of Cenon is an administrative division of the Gironde department, southwestern France. Its borders were modified at the French canton reorganisation which came into effect in March 2015. Its seat is in Cenon.

It consists of the following communes:

1. Bouliac
2. Cenon
3. Floirac
