= Mérignac Centre tram stop =

Tram stop in Mérignac, France

Mérignac Centre

General information
- Location: Mérignac; France
- Coordinates: 44°50′29″N 0°38′48″W
- Line: Line A

Construction
- Architect: Elizabeth de Portzamparc

History
- Opened: 21 June 2007

Services
Preceding station	Bordeaux tramway	Following station
Pin Galant towards Le Haillan Rostand	Line A	Lycées de Mérignac towards La Gardette - Bassens - Carbon-Blanc or Floirac Dravemont
Location
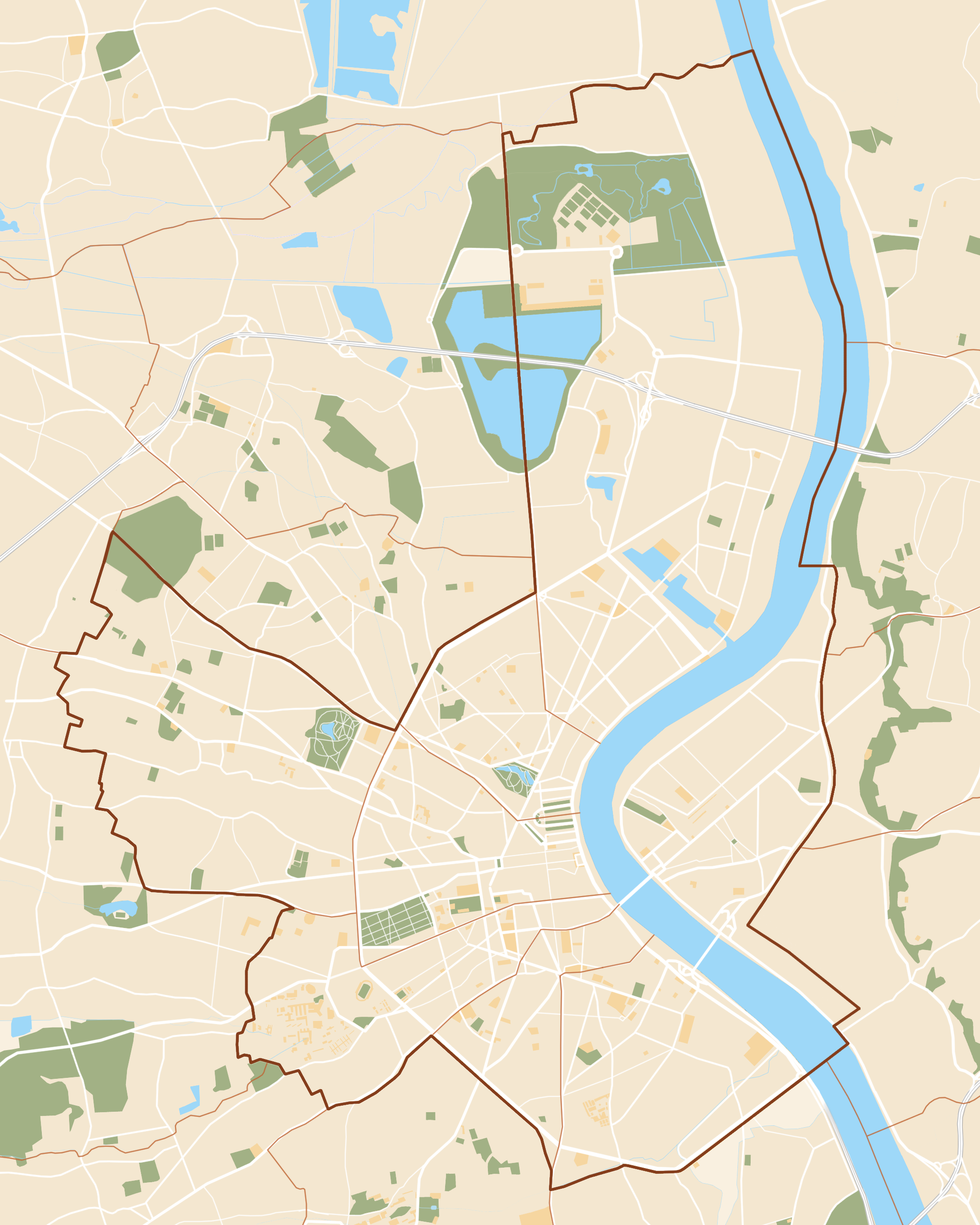
- Location within Bordeaux Location within Nouvelle-Aquitaine Location within France

Mérignac Centre tram stop (French pronunciation: [meʁiɲak sɑ̃tʁ]) is a tram stop on line A of the Tramway de Bordeaux, and served as terminus of that line between 21 June 2007, when the line was extended from Saint-Augustin, until 24 January 2015, when the line was extended to Le Haillan-Rostand.. The stop is located on Avenue du Maréchal Leclerc in the commune of Mérignac and is operated by the TBC.

For most of the day on Mondays to Fridays, trams run at least every five minutes in both directions through the stop. Services run less frequently in the early morning, late evenings, weekends and public holidays.

== Interchanges ==
- TBM bus network:

-	1	=>Bordeaux-Gare Saint Jean
-	30	Saint-Aubin-Lycée Sud Médoc <=> Mérignac-Cimetière Intercommunal
-	33	Bordeaux-Cracovie <=> Mérignac-Soleil
-	35	Mérignac-Phare <=> Blanquefort-Caychac or -Ecoparc
-	42	=> Mérignac-Place Mondésir

- Trans Gironde network:

603	Mérignac Centre <=> Martignas-sur-Jalle-Allée de Loupiac
701	Gare Saint-Jean ou Sainte-Hélène-Bourg <=> Le Porge-Eglise ou -Océan
702	Gare Saint-Jean ou Mérignac Centre <=> Lacanau-Longarisse

== Close by ==
- Collège Jules Ferry
- Police
- Gendarmerie
- Médiathèque
- Mérignac Ciné
