= Claveau tram stop =

Tram stop in Bordeaux, France

Claveau
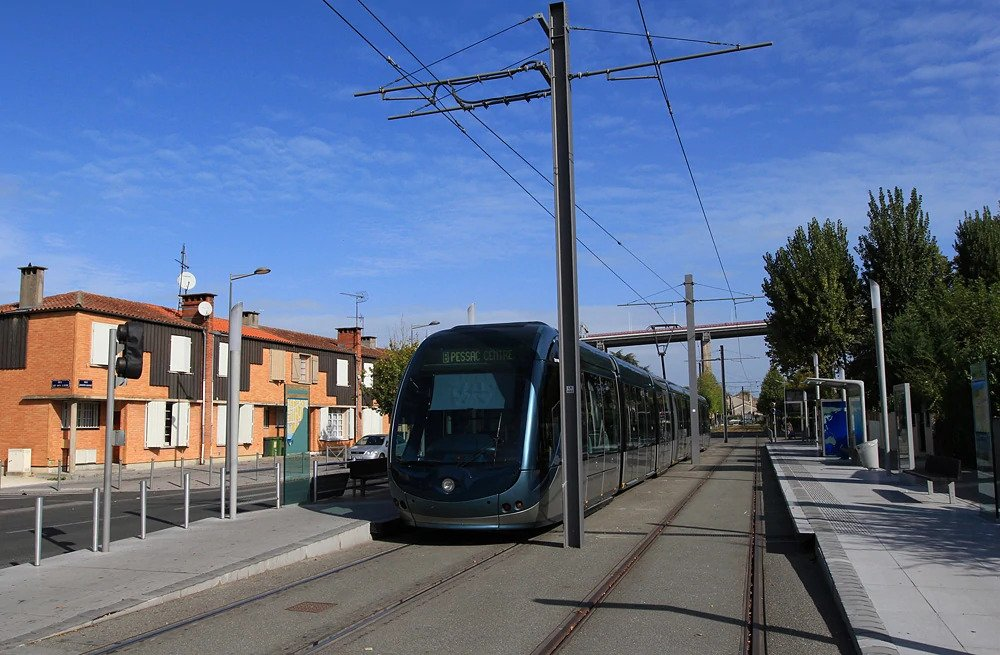

General information
- Location: Bordeaux; France
- Coordinates: 44°52′40″N 0°32′38″W
- Line: Line B

History
- Opened: 20 October 2008

Services
Preceding station	Bordeaux tramway	Following station
Brandenburg towards France Alouette or Pessac Centre	Line B	Berges de la Garonne Terminus
Location
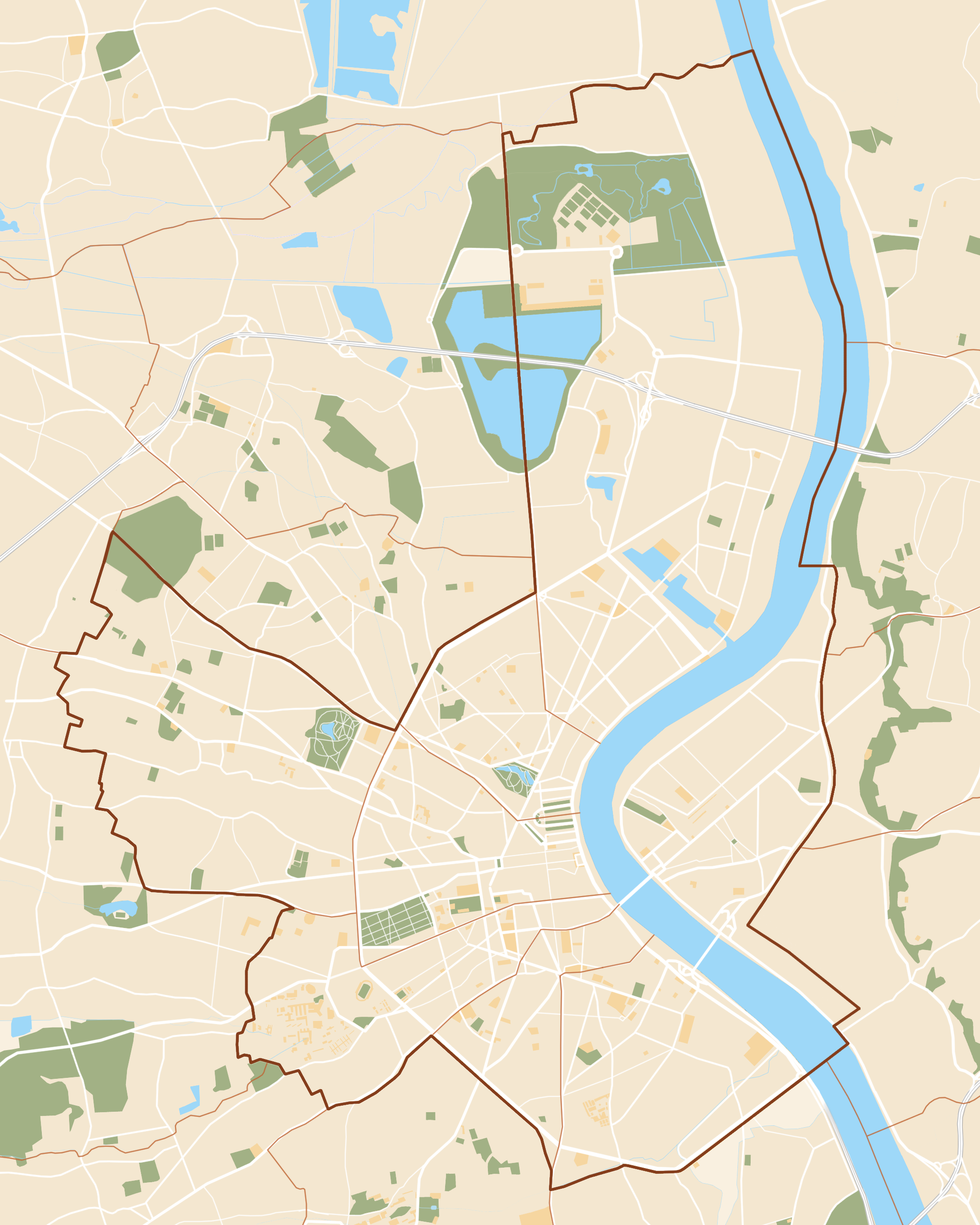
- Location within Bordeaux Location within Nouvelle-Aquitaine

Claveau tram stop is located on line B of the Tramway de Bordeaux. It served as the terminus of the line from 20 October 2008, when it was extended from Bassins à Flot, until 20 June 2014, when the line was extended north to Berges de la Garonne. The stop is located on Rue Joseph Brunet in the city of Bordeaux and is operated by Transports Bordeaux Métropole.

For most of the day on Mondays to Fridays, trams run at least every five minutes between central Bordeaux and Claveau, with alternate trams continuing to Berges de la Garonne. Services run less frequently in the early morning, late evenings, weekends and public holidays.

The tram stop has two tracks, as does the line to the south, and the stop is served by two side platforms. Immediately to the north of the stop, there is a turnback siding and the line becomes single track and continues as such to the terminus at the next stop, Berges de la Garonne.

== Close by ==
- Piscine Georges Tissot
- Centre d'animation
