= Floirac, Gironde =

Floirac
- Commune
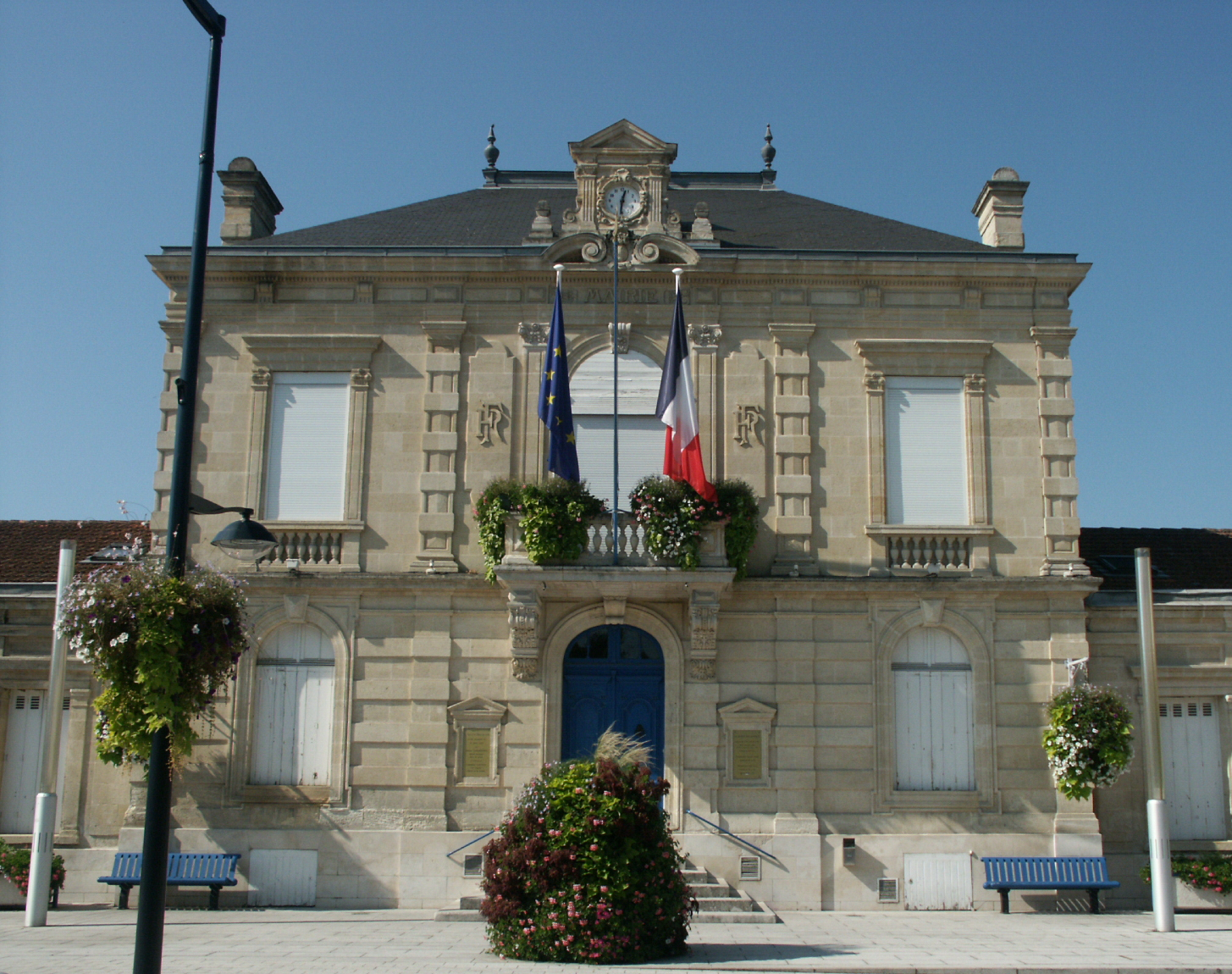
- Town hall

- Coat of arms
- Location of Floirac
- Location within France Location within Nouvelle-Aquitaine
- Coordinates: 44°50′15″N 0°31′29″W
- Country: France
- Region: Nouvelle-Aquitaine
- Department: Gironde
- Arrondissement: Bordeaux
- Canton: Cenon
- Intercommunality: Bordeaux Métropole

Government
  - Mayor (2020–2026): Jean-Jacques Puyobrau
- Area^{1}: 8.59 km^{2} (3.32 sq mi)
- Elevation: 70 m (230 ft)
- Highest elevation: 79 m (259 ft)
- Lowest elevation: 3 m (9.8 ft)
- Population (2023): 18,300
  - Density: 2,130/km^{2} (5,520/sq mi)
- Demonym: Floiracais·e
- Time zone: UTC+01:00 (CET)
  - Summer (DST): UTC+02:00 (CEST)
- INSEE/Postal code: 33167 /33270
- ^{1} French Land Register data, which excludes lakes, ponds, glaciers > 1 km^{2} (0.386 sq mi or 247 acres) and river estuaries.

Floirac (French pronunciation: [flwaʁak]; Occitan: Hloirac) is a commune in the department of Gironde, New Aquitaine, southwestern France.

== Population ==
Historical population

Year	Pop.	±% p.a.
1793	1,200	—
1800	1,069	−1.64%
1806	1,053	−0.25%
1821	956	−0.64%
1831	965	+0.09%
1836	998	+0.67%
1841	1,186	+3.51%
1846	1,166	−0.34%
1851	1,312	+2.39%
1856	1,421	+1.61%
1861	1,537	+1.58%
1866	1,524	−0.17%
1872	1,640	+1.23%
1876	1,585	−0.85%
1881	1,842	+3.05%
1886	2,265	+4.22%
1891	2,311	+0.40%
1896	2,517	+1.72%
1901	2,642	+0.97%

Year	Pop.	±% p.a.
1906	2,799	+1.16%
1911	3,152	+2.40%
1921	4,826	+4.35%
1926	6,474	+6.05%
1931	7,180	+2.09%
1936	7,024	−0.44%
1946	7,062	+0.05%
1954	7,621	+0.96%
1962	8,196	+0.91%
1968	8,241	+0.09%
1975	12,040	+5.57%
1982	14,477	+2.67%
1990	16,834	+1.90%
1999	16,157	−0.46%
2007	15,794	−0.28%
2012	16,508	+0.89%
2017	17,463	+1.13%
2023	18,300	+0.78%

Source: EHESS and INSEE (1968-2023)

== Twin towns ==
Floirac is twinned with:

- Diébougou, Burkina Faso
- Burlada, Spain, since 1985

== Notable people ==
- Charles Lacoste

== See also ==
- Bordeaux Observatory
- Communes of the Gironde department
