= Rue Sainte-Catherine (Bordeaux) =

Thoroughfare in Bordeaux, France

Coordinates: 44.8398°N 0.574183°W

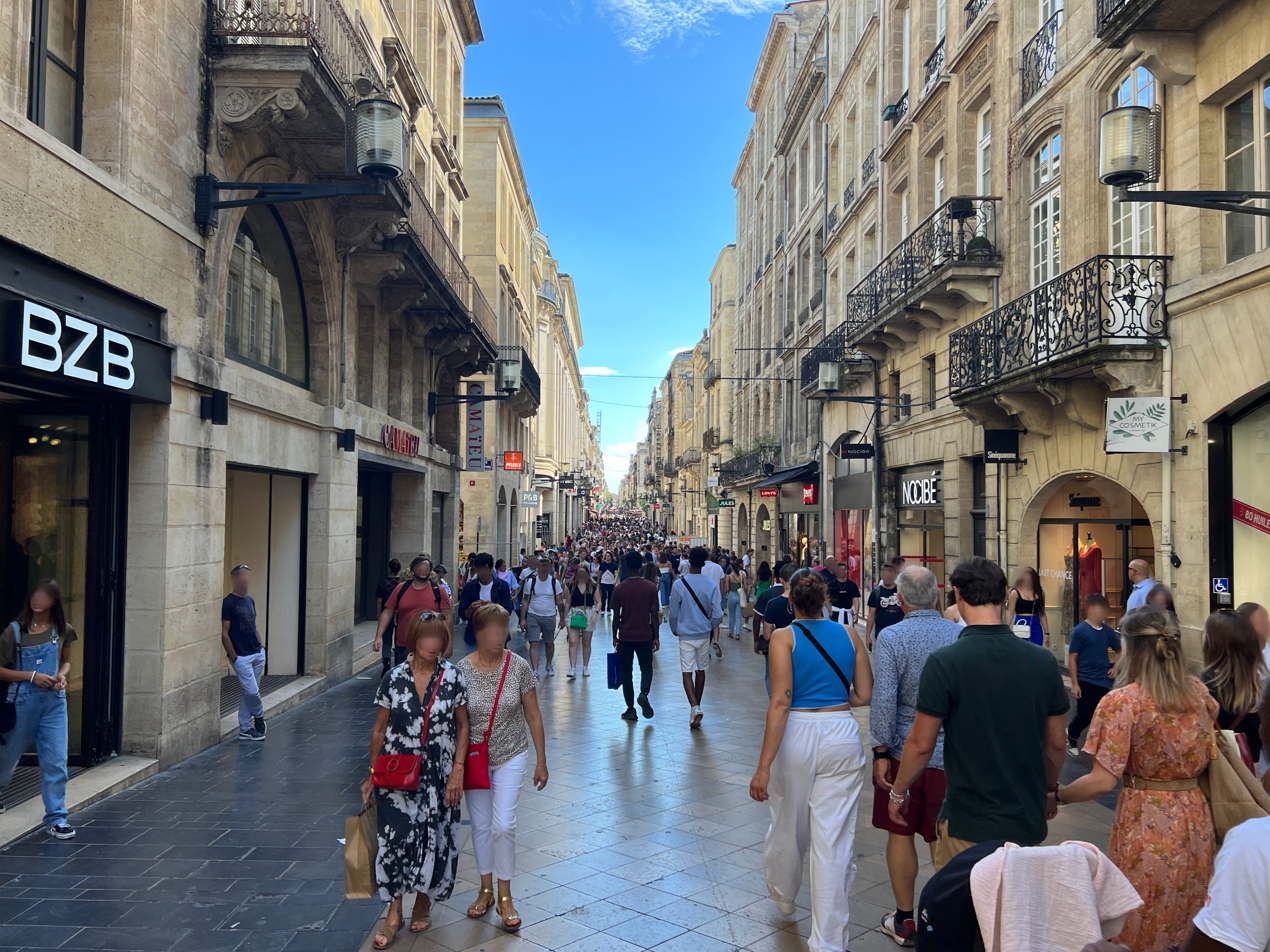
Rue Sainte-Catherine in Bordeaux on a busy day

The Rue Sainte-Catherine (French pronunciation: [ʁy sɛ̃t katʁin]), a 1.2 km long pedestrian street, is the main shopping street in Bordeaux, France.

Located on the former Roman cardo, this street is one of two main lines running through the historic part of the city. It cuts the center following a north-south axis linking the Place de la Comédie where the Grand Theatre stands to the Place de la Victoire.

The Rue Sainte-Catherine and neighborhoods located to the west are commercial areas. The street became pedestrian for most of its length between 1976 and 1977 and then in full in 1984. It is often billed as the longest pedestrian street in Europe. It was completely refurbished between 2000 and 2003 in a project by Jean-Michel Wilmotte.

At the center of the Rue Sainte-Catherine is the Place Saint-Projet (named after the Auvergnat bishop who died in 674). The cross intersection was restored in 1977, it was at the centre of a cemetery since 1392. The church was located to the south and its bell tower still remains. The fountain was made around 1715.

At the top of the street is one of the entrances to the Galerie Bordelaise, a shopping mall which opened in 1834.

At the junction of the street and the Cours Alsace-Lorraine, a bas-relief indicates the presence of two underground rivers that are flowing into the Garonne: the Peugue and Devèze.

== Transport ==
The Rue Sainte-Catherine is served by Line A of the Tramway de Bordeaux, station Sainte-Catherine, and Line B, stations Grand Théâtre and Victoire.
