= Cenon =

- Commune
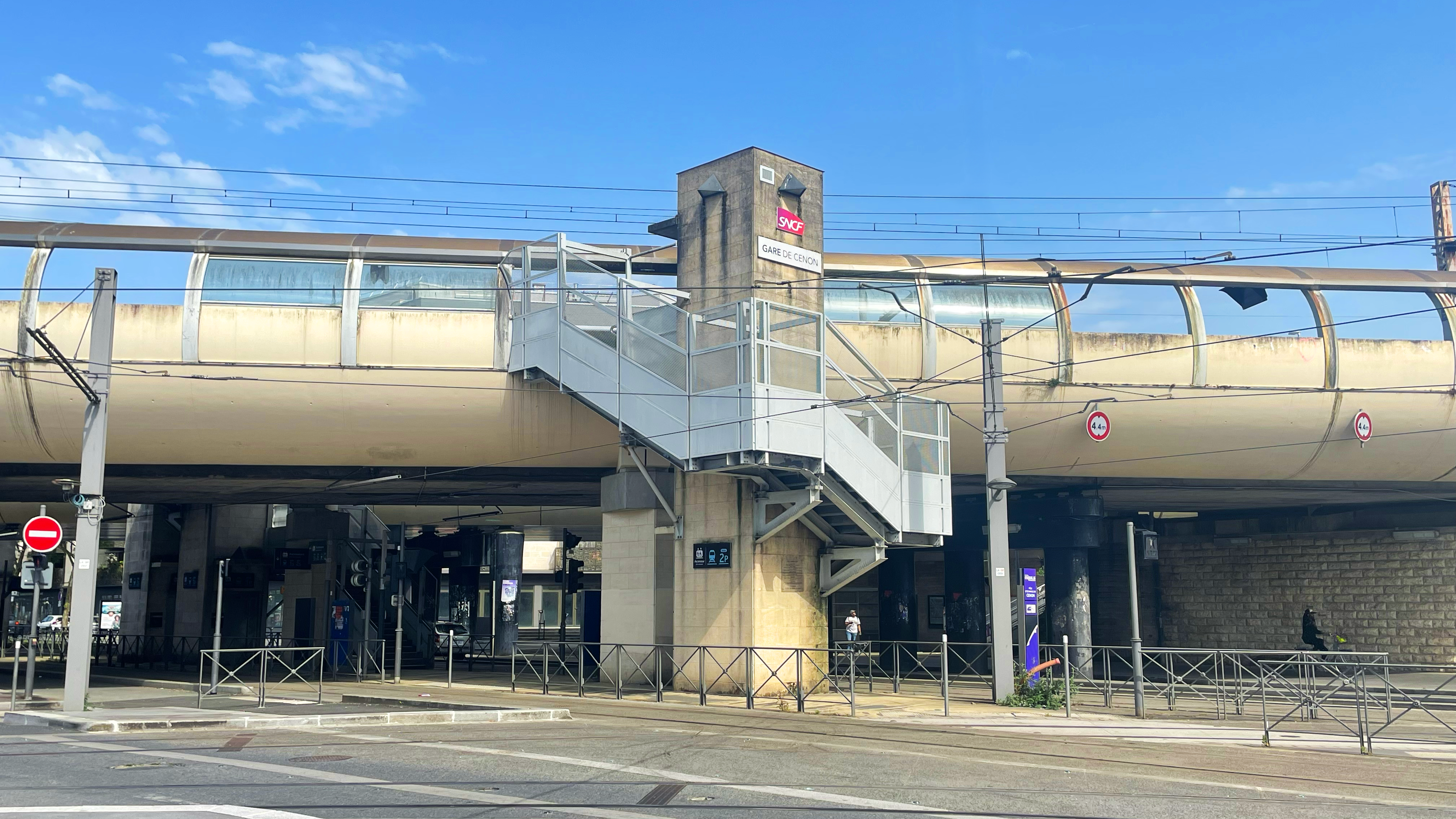
- Train station

- Coat of arms
- Location of Cenon
- Location within France Location within Nouvelle-Aquitaine
- Coordinates: 44°51′28″N 0°31′54″W
- Country: France
- Region: Nouvelle-Aquitaine
- Department: Gironde
- Arrondissement: Bordeaux
- Canton: Cenon
- Intercommunality: Bordeaux Métropole

Government
  - Mayor (2020–2026): Jean-François Egron
- Area^{1}: 5.52 km^{2} (2.13 sq mi)
- Elevation: 123 m (404 ft)
- Highest elevation: 75 m (246 ft)
- Lowest elevation: 3 m (9.8 ft)
- Population (2023): 26,834
  - Density: 4,860/km^{2} (12,600/sq mi)
- Demonym: Cenonnais(e)
- Time zone: UTC+01:00 (CET)
  - Summer (DST): UTC+02:00 (CEST)
- INSEE/Postal code: 33119 /33150
- ^{1} French Land Register data, which excludes lakes, ponds, glaciers > 1 km^{2} (0.386 sq mi or 247 acres) and river estuaries.

Cenon (French pronunciation: [sənɔ̃]; Gascon: Senon) is a commune in the department of Gironde, Nouvelle-Aquitaine, southwestern France.

It is a suburb of the city of Bordeaux, and is adjacent to it on the east side.

== History ==
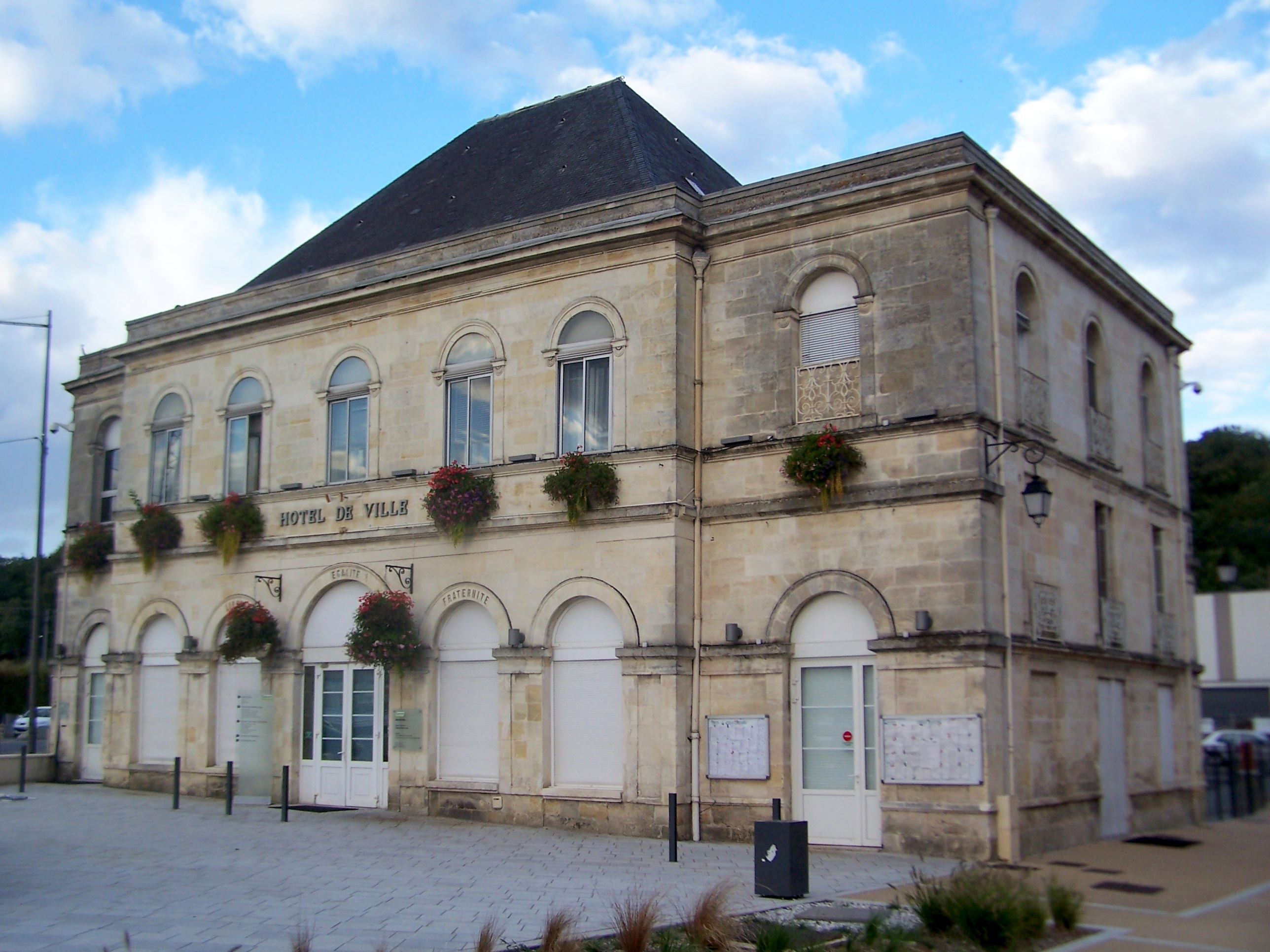
The Hôtel de Ville

The Hôtel de Ville was commissioned as a private residence and dated back at least to 1824.

== Notable people ==
- Virgile Pinson, footballer

== Heraldry ==
Coat of arms of Cenon	Gules, a doe salient or, above a wavy, couped and reduced barry of twelve argent and azure pieces issuing from a reversed oliphant or on the dexter side and faulted on the sinister side in the center of the shield, and sinistered by a cypress vert trunked or, the animal and the tree placed on an isolated terrace vert.

== Population ==
Historical population

Year	Pop.	±% p.a.
1793	1,395	—
1800	568	−12.05%
1806	1,329	+15.22%
1821	1,437	+0.52%
1831	1,805	+2.31%
1836	2,033	+2.41%
1841	2,607	+5.10%
1846	3,281	+4.71%
1851	4,022	+4.16%
1856	5,686	+7.17%
1861	6,817	+3.69%
1866	848	−34.09%
1872	970	+2.27%
1876	1,080	+2.72%
1881	1,264	+3.20%
1886	1,767	+6.93%
1891	2,199	+4.47%
1896	2,587	+3.30%
1901	3,556	+6.57%

Year	Pop.	±% p.a.
1906	3,817	+1.43%
1911	4,806	+4.72%
1921	6,650	+3.30%
1926	8,153	+4.16%
1931	9,700	+3.54%
1936	10,087	+0.79%
1946	10,051	−0.04%
1954	10,747	+0.84%
1962	13,821	+3.19%
1968	17,713	+4.22%
1975	24,769	+4.91%
1982	23,520	−0.74%
1990	21,363	−1.20%
1999	21,283	−0.04%
2007	22,732	+0.83%
2012	22,385	−0.31%
2017	24,729	+2.01%
2023	26,834	+1.37%

Source: EHESS and INSEE (1968-2023)

== See also ==
- Communes of the Gironde department
