= Floirac Dravemont tram stop =

Tram stop in Floirac, France

Floirac Dravemont

General information
- Location: Floirac; France
- Coordinates: 44°50′48″N 0°30′37″W
- Line: Line A

History
- Opened: 27 February 2007

Services
Preceding station	Bordeaux tramway	Following station
La Marègue towards Le Haillan Rostand	Line A	Terminus
Location
- Location within Nouvelle-Aquitaine Location within France

Floirac Dravemont tram stop is the terminus of the southern branch of line A of the Tramway de Bordeaux. It opened on 27 February 2007, when the line was extended from La Morlette. The stop is located in the commune of Floirac and is operated by the TBC.

For most of the day on Mondays to Fridays, trams run every ten minutes between Floirac Dravemont and Bordeaux city centre. Services run less frequently in the early morning, late evenings, weekends and public holidays.

== Interchanges ==
- TBM bus network:

-	28	Bordeaux-Galin <=> Bordeaux-Stalingrad
-	32	Bouliac-Centre commercial <=> Cenon-Gare
-	80	Bordeaux-Stalingrad <=> Artigues-Tout Y Faut
