= Le Haillan Rostand tram stop =

Tram stop in Le Haillan, France

Le Haillan Rostand
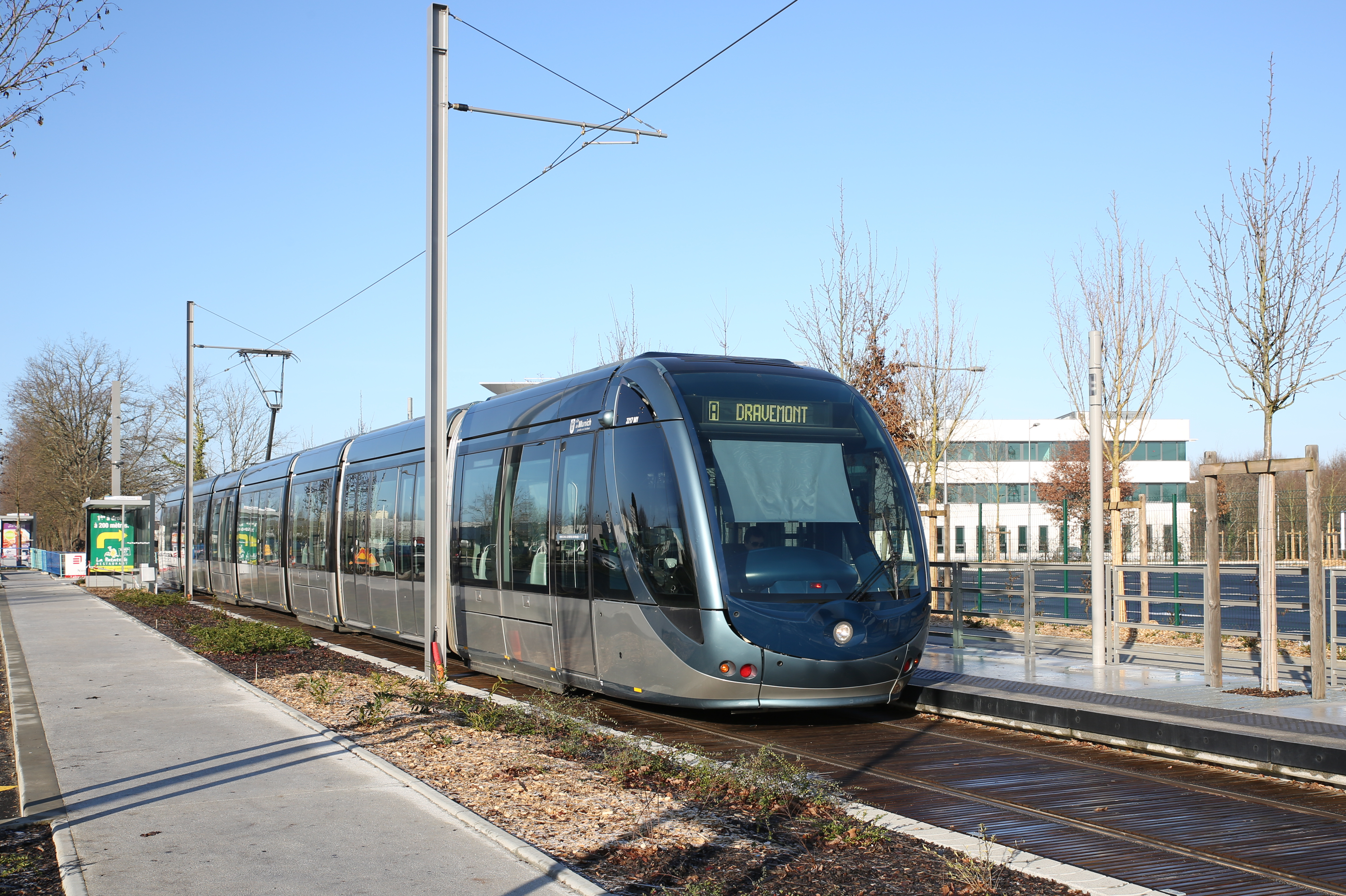

General information
- Location: Le Haillan; France
- Coordinates: 44°51′31″N 0°40′06″W
- Line: Line A

History
- Opened: 24 January 2015

Services
Preceding station	Bordeaux tramway	Following station
Terminus	Line A	Les Pins towards La Gardette - Bassens - Carbon-Blanc or Floirac Dravemont
Location
- Location within Nouvelle-Aquitaine Location within France

Le Haillan Rostand tram stop is a tram stop on line A of the Tramway de Bordeaux. It opened on 24 January 2015, when the line was extended from Mérignac Centre and it is the current western terminus of line A. The stop is located just outside the Bordeaux ring road on Avenue de Magudas and in the commune of Le Haillan. It is operated by Transports Bordeaux Métropole.

For most of the day on Mondays to Fridays, trams run at least every ten minutes to and from central Bordeaux. Services run less frequently in the early morning, late evenings, weekends and public holidays.

The tram stop has just one platform, serving a single terminal track. This single track threads its way through the complex grade-separated intersection between the Avenue de Magudas and the ring road until it reaches a point just before the next stop, Les Pins, where the line becomes double track.

== Interchanges ==
- TBM bus network:

-	30	Saint-Aubin-Lycée Sud Médoc <=> Mérignac-Cimetière Intercommunal
-	36	=> Villenave-Bourg
-	38	Mérignac-Phare <=> Blanquefort-Caychac or -Ecoparc
-	39	Mérignac-Les Pins <=> Pessac-Photonique
-	71	Le Taillan-Lycée Sud Médoc <=> Mérignac-Barbusse
-	84	=> Saint-Médard-ZA Picot
