= Berges de la Garonne tram stop =

Tram stop in Bordeaux, France

Berges de la Garonne
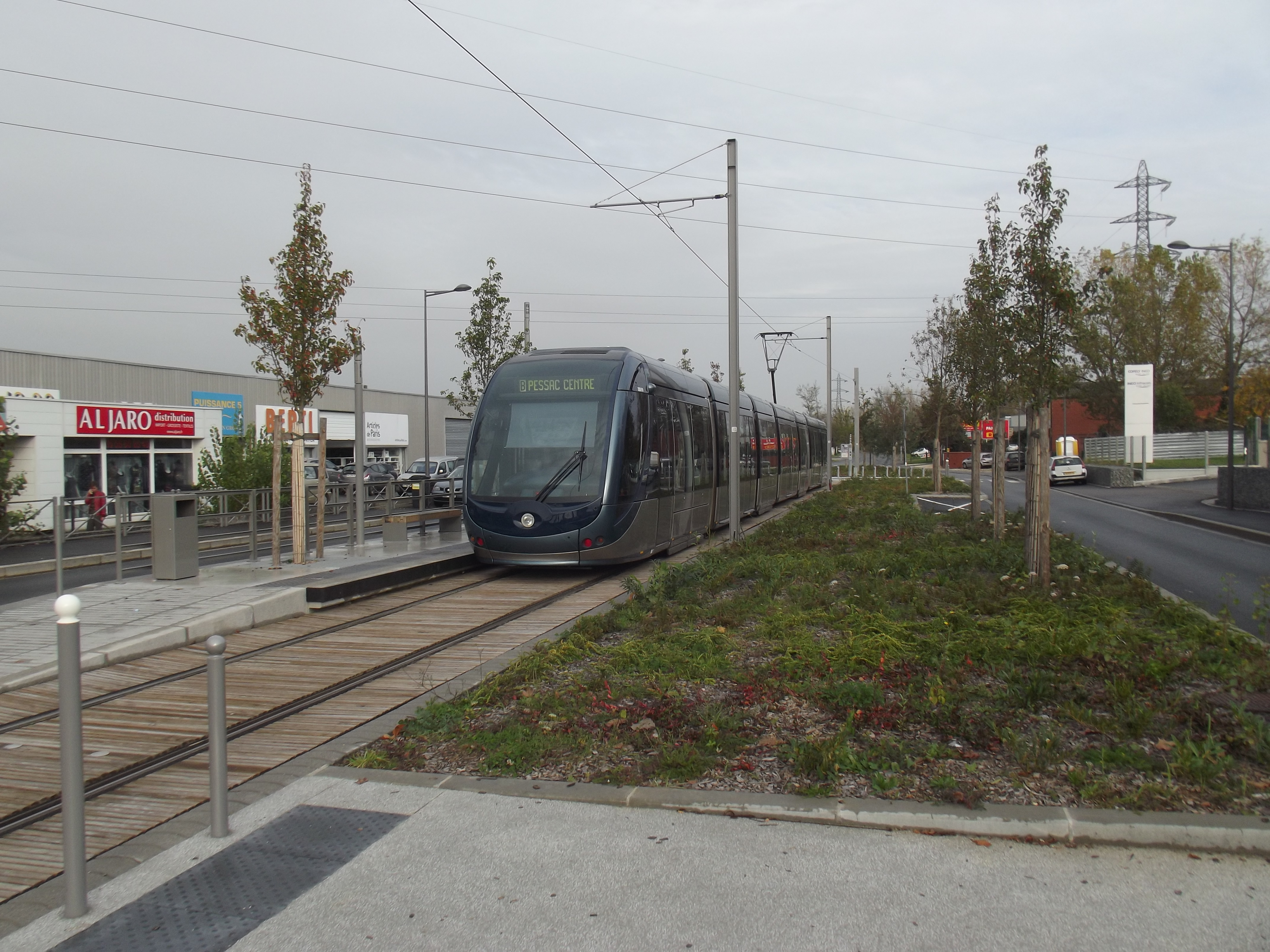

General information
- Location: Bordeaux; France
- Coordinates: 44°53′08″N 0°32′30″W
- Line: Line B

History
- Opened: 20 June 2014

Services
Preceding station	Bordeaux tramway	Following station
Claveau towards France Alouette or Pessac Centre	Line B	Terminus
Location
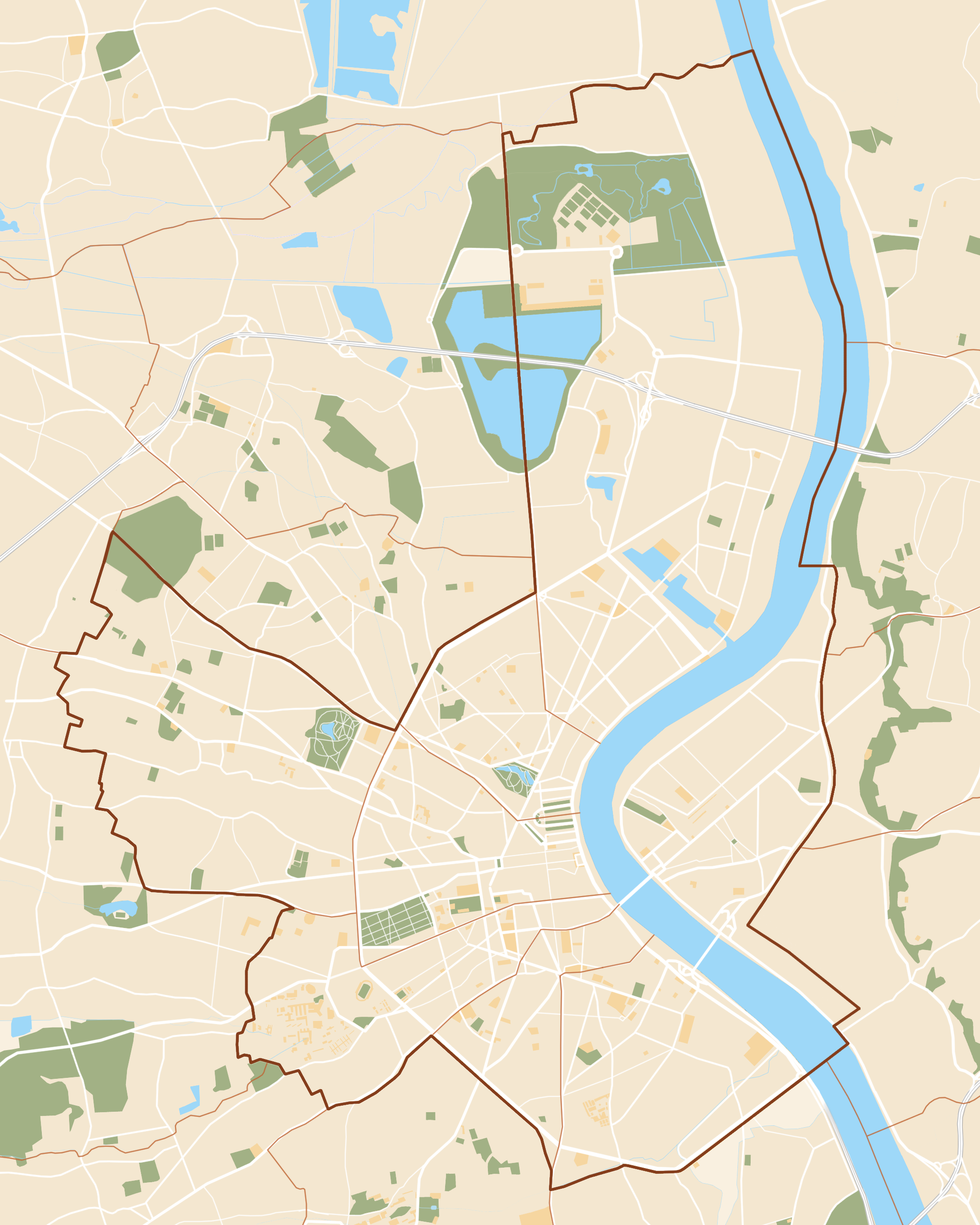
- Location within Bordeaux Location within Nouvelle-Aquitaine

Berges de la Garonne tram stop is located on line B of the Tramway de Bordeaux. It opened on 20 June 2014, when the line was extended from Claveau, and is the current northern terminus of line B. The stop is located on Avenue du Docteur Schinazi in the city of Bordeaux and is operated by Transports Bordeaux Métropole.

For most of the day on Mondays to Fridays, trams run at least every ten minutes. Services run less frequently in the early morning, late evenings, weekends and public holidays.

The tram stop is situated in the central reservation of Avenue du Docteur Schinazi and has just one platform, serving the single terminal track that continues south to Claveau.
