= France Alouette tram stop =

Tram stop in Pessac, France

France Alouette
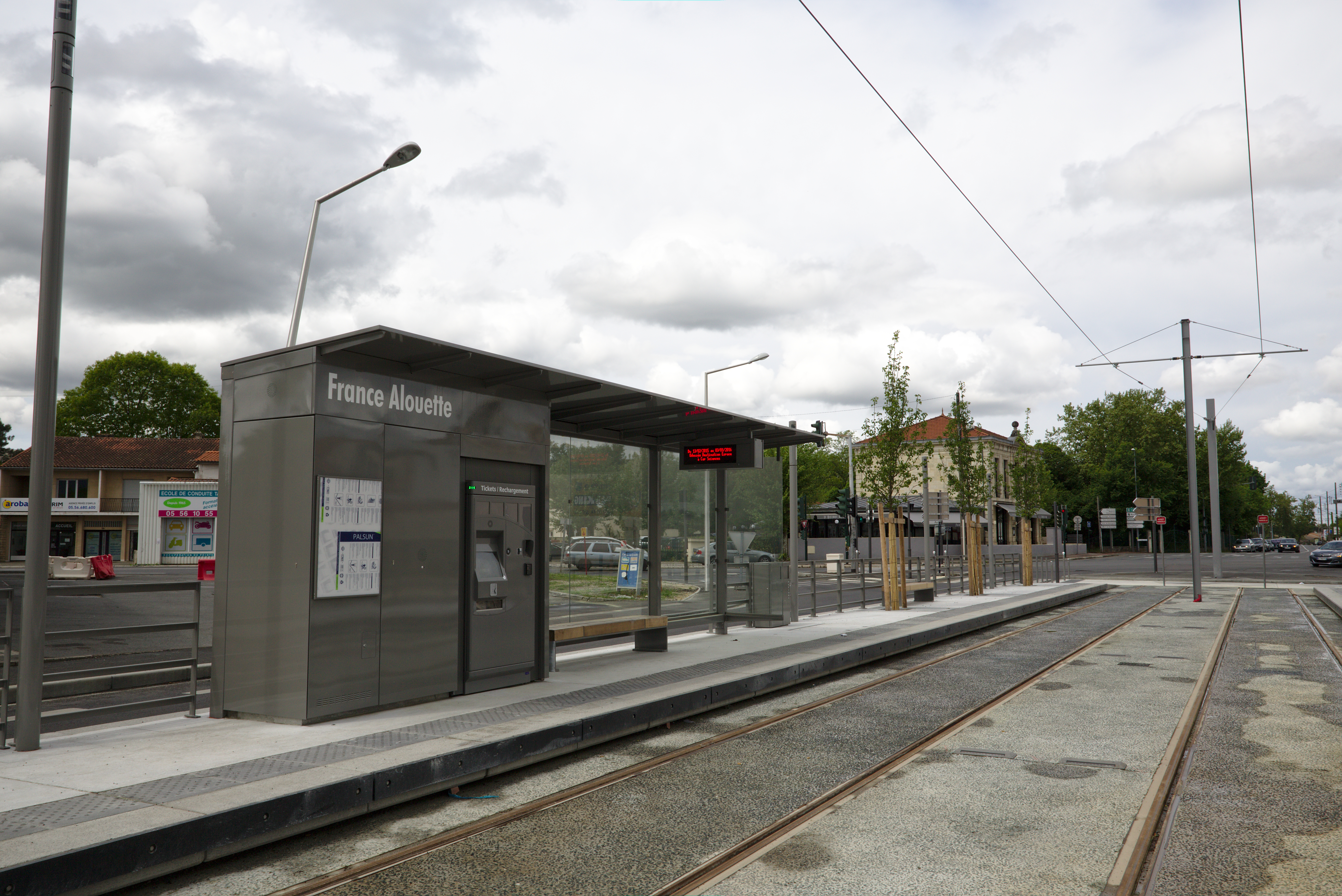
- France Alouette tram stop under construction

General information
- Location: Pessac; France
- Coordinates: 44°47′55″N 0°39′47″W
- Line: Line B

History
- Opened: April 2015

Services
Preceding station	Bordeaux tramway	Following station
Terminus	Line B	Gare Pessac Alouette towards Berges de la Garonne
Location
- Location within Nouvelle-Aquitaine Location within France

France Alouette tram stop is the terminus of the Pessac Alouette branch of line B of the Bordeaux tramway, and is located in the commune of Pessac. The stop was inaugurated in April 2015, when a second branch of line B was opened from Bougnard to France Alouette. The stop is operated by Transports Bordeaux Métropole.

For most of the day on Mondays to Fridays, trams run at least every ten minutes between France Alouette and Bordeaux city centre. Services run less frequently in the early morning, late evenings, weekends and public holidays.
