= Durmazlar Panorama =

Series of trams built by Durmazlar Makine

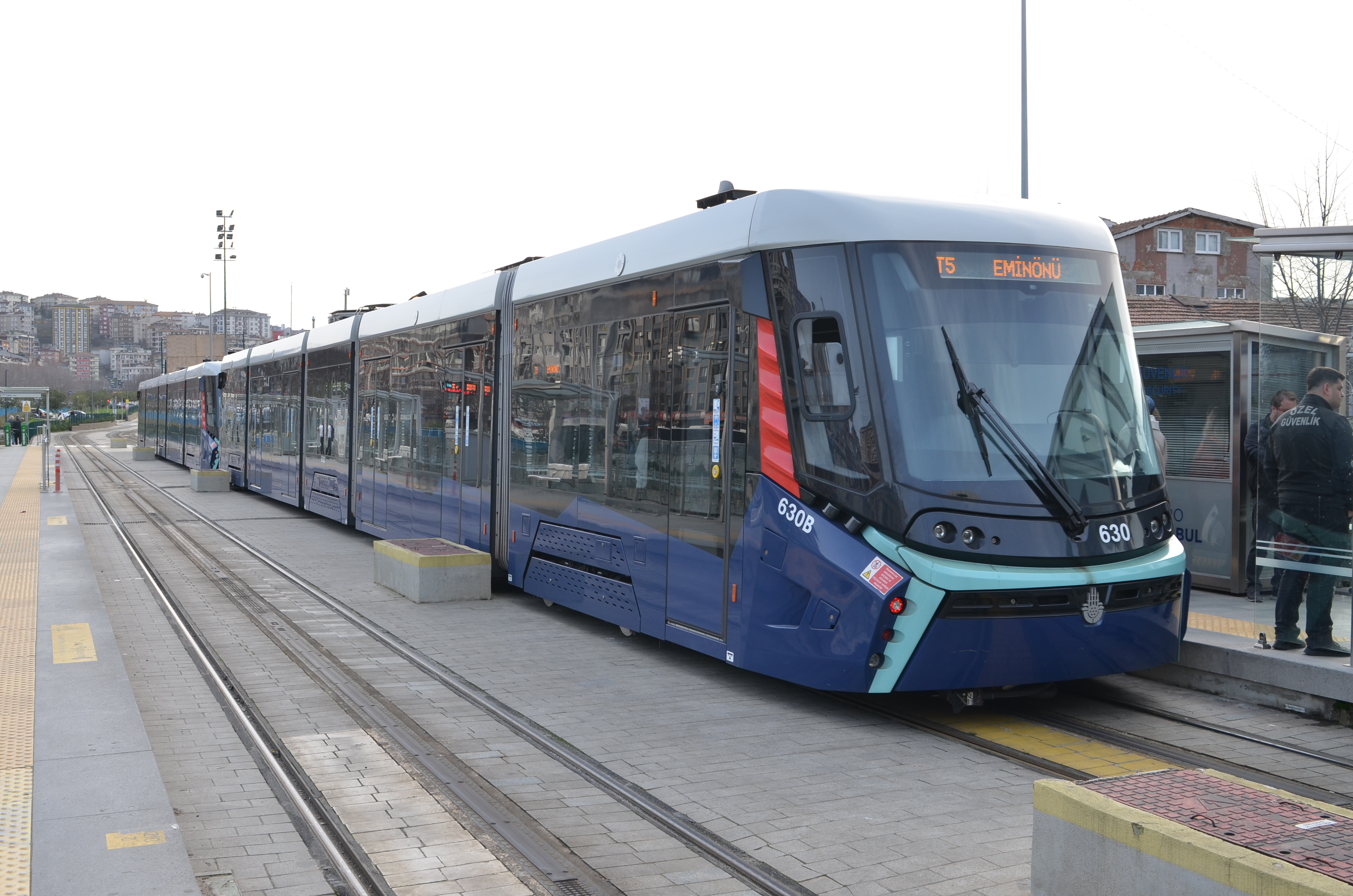
- A coupled set of Panorama trams on the Istanbul Tram, 2026
- Stock type: Tram
- Manufacturer: Durmazlar Makine
- Constructed: 2016–2023
- Number built: Izmit: 18 Samsun: 8 Istanbul: 30; Olsztyn: 18 Reșița: 13
- Capacity: 240 standing; 290 total

Specifications
- Train length: 31–33 metres (101 ft 8 in – 108 ft 3 in)
- Width: 2,650 millimetres (8 ft 8 in)
- Height: 3,500 millimetres (11 ft 6 in)
- Low-floor: 100%
- Maximum speed: 70 kilometres per hour (43 mph)
- Weight: 44.6 tonnes (44,600 kg)
- Electric systems: Alstom APS (Istanbul) 750 V DC Overhead line (Izmit, Samsun) 600 V DC Overhead line (Olsztyn, Reșița)
- Track gauge: 1,435 mm (4 ft 8 1/2 in)

The Durmazlar Panorama is a series of low-floor, articulated trams built by Durmazlar Makine. First introduced in 2016, the model operates in Istanbul, Izmit, Samsun, Olsztyn, and Reșița.

== Orders ==
=== Izmit ===
In October 2015, 12 Panorama trams were ordered for the then-under construction Akçaray light rail system in Izmit, Turkey. The trams, which are 33 metres (108 ft 3 in) long and 2.65 metres (8 ft 8 in) wide, entered service in conjunction with the network's opening on 17 June 2017. In 2018, six additional trams were ordered, bringing the total number of Panorama vehicles operating in Izmit to 18.

=== Samsun ===
The city of Samsun, Turkey, ordered eight Panorama trams to be put in service on the city's extended tramway network in October 2015. The first of the 31.8 m (104 ft 4 in) long trams was delivered on 26 October 2016, and entered service on 5 November 2016, with delivery lasting until early 2017.

=== Istanbul ===
The Istanbul Metropolitan Municipality ordered 30 Panorama trams in January 2018, for operation on the under construction T5 line of the Istanbul tram network in Istanbul, Turkey. The first tram was unveiled in March 2019, and began test running on the line on 19 March 2019. The trams entered service along with the line on 4 January 2021. The last of the 30 trams for the line was delivered on 24 November 2022.

Unlike other Panorama trams built, the vehicles in Istanbul use Alstom's APS catenary-free power supply system, and are also capable of running in coupled sets.

=== Olsztyn ===
In May 2018, the city of Olsztyn, Poland, ordered 12 Panorama trams (with an option for 12 more) to operate on the Olsztyn tram network. The first tram was completed in January 2020, and was delivered on 14 February 2020. The order was later extended, with six more trams being added to bring the total up to 18. The first two entered service on the network on 14 June 2021, and the last tram was delivered on 10 February 2022. Designated as the Panorama DRP5H05, the trams are 32.5 metres (106 ft 8 in) long.

=== Reșița ===
In June 2020, the city of Reșița, Romania, ordered 13 Panorama trams to operate on the Reșița tram network. The first of the trams was delivered on 29 January 2023. The fleet was put into revenue service in conjunction with the tramway network's opening on 20 December 2024. Unlike other Panorama trams built, which show similarities to each other in terms of overall design, the trams in Reșița are highly customized, with the two-section vehicles having a length of 18 m (59 ft 1 in), a width of 2.4 m (7 ft 10 in), and a capacity of 135 passengers, as well as a specialized livery designed by Durmazlar to reflect the city's history.

=== Bucharest ===
In November 2019, Durmazlar was awarded a bid to supply 100 Panorama trams to the Bucharest tram network in Bucharest, Romania, beating a consortium of Romanian manufacturer Astra Vagoane Călători and CRRC Qingdao Sifang. However, the losing consortium filed legal complaints to Romania's Court of Appeals, which led the decision to award Durmazlar the bid being overturned in August 2020, thus resulting in the cancellation of the order.

== Gallery ==
=== Izmit ===
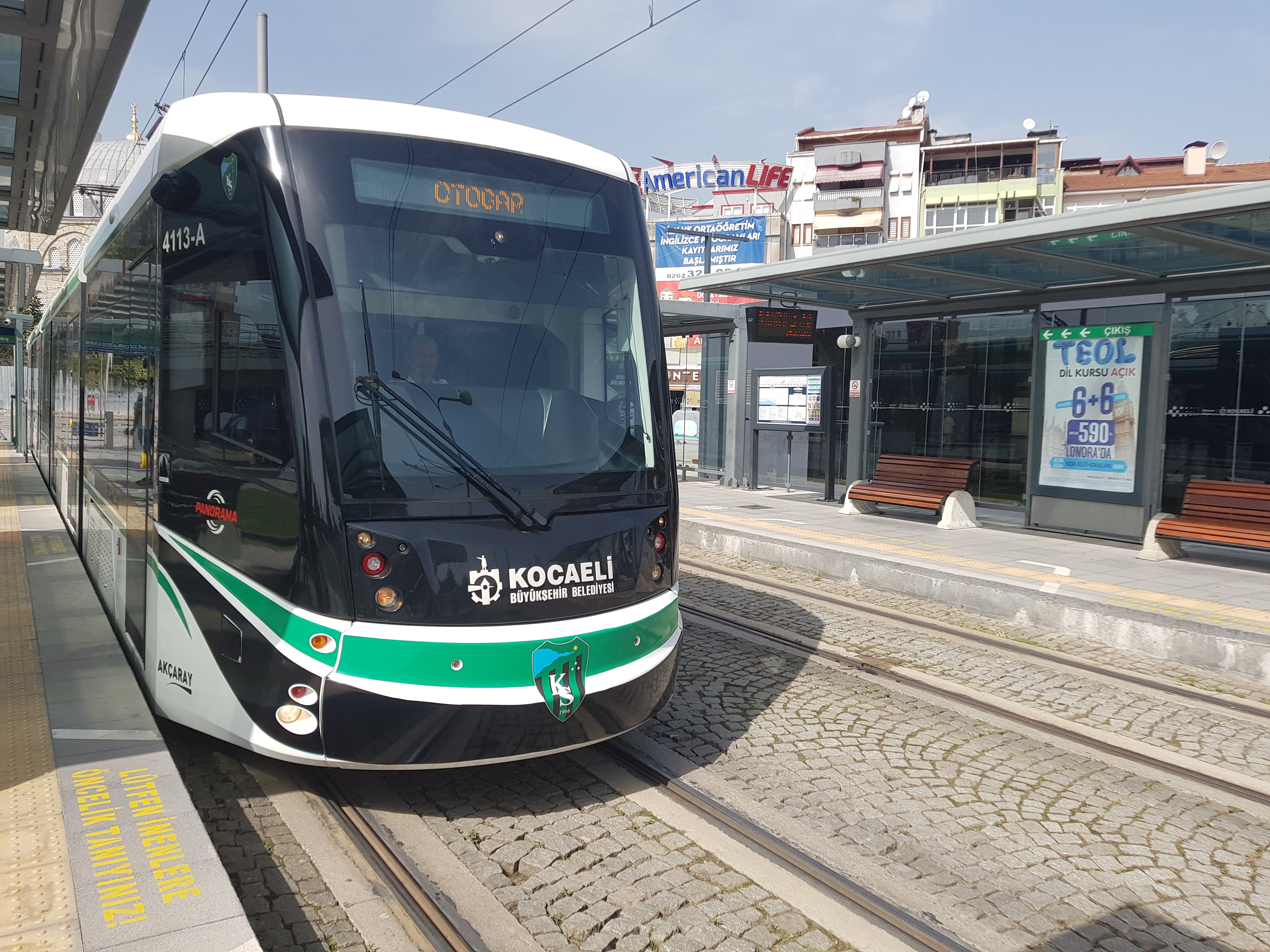

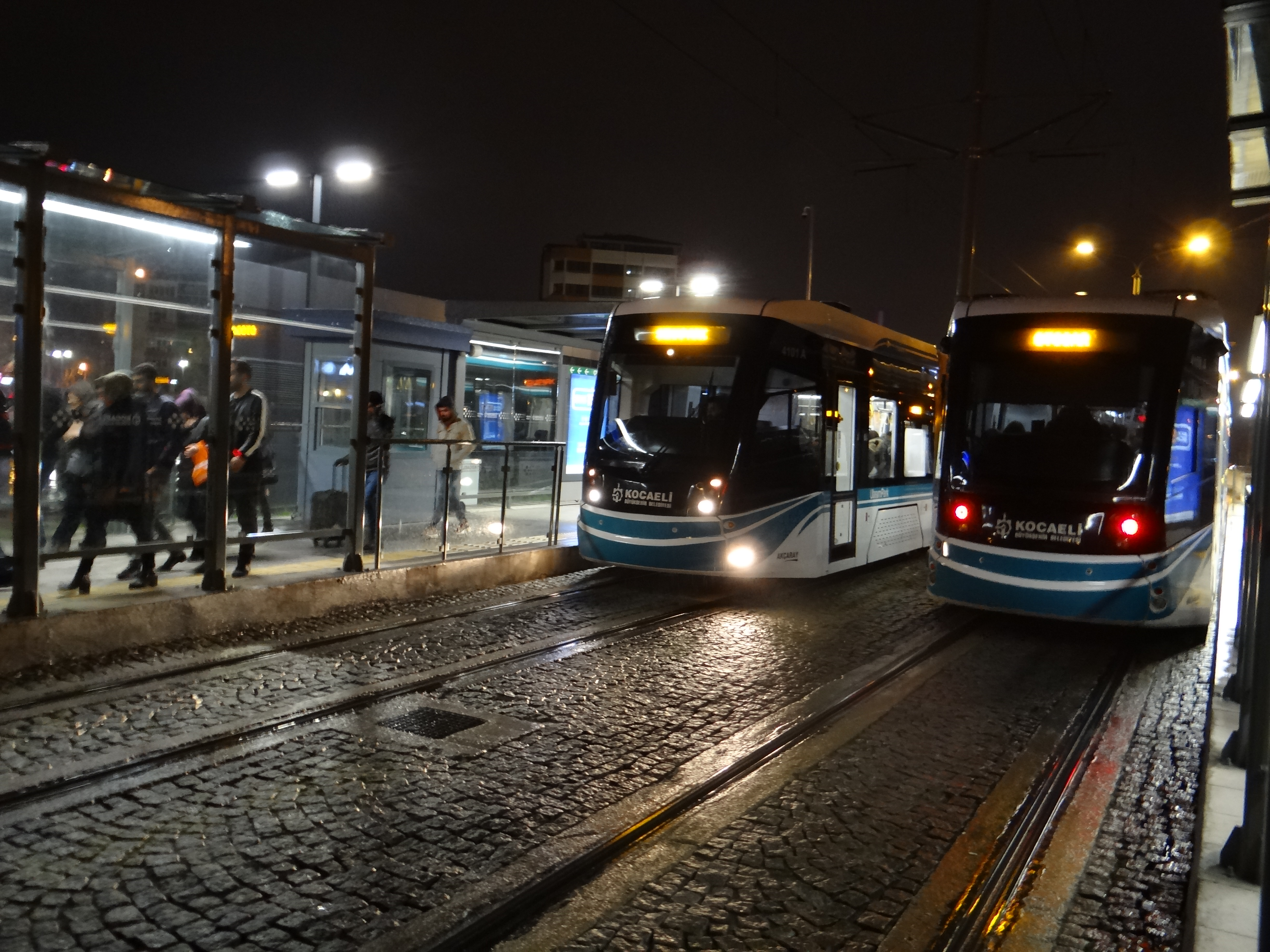

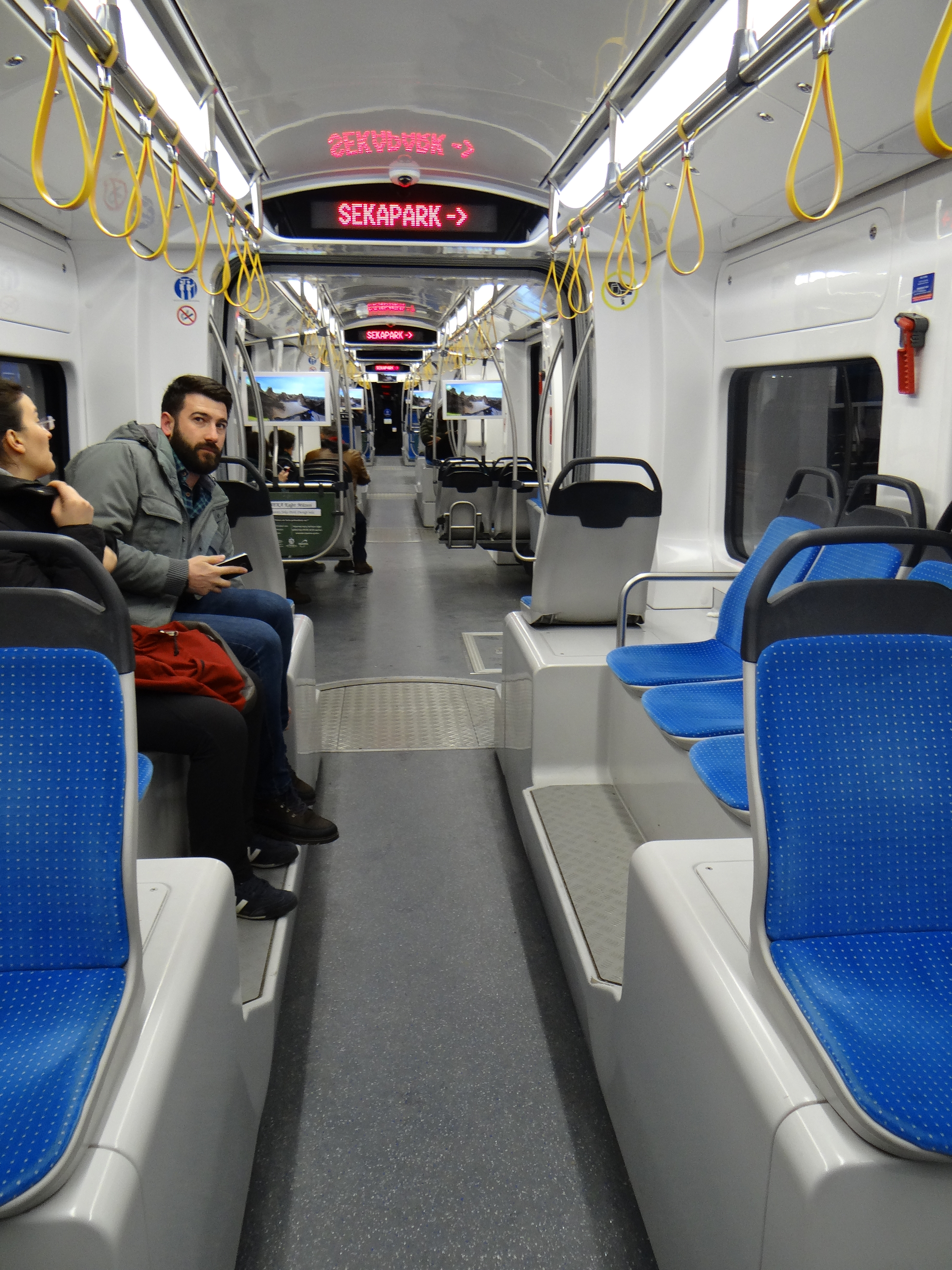

=== Istanbul ===
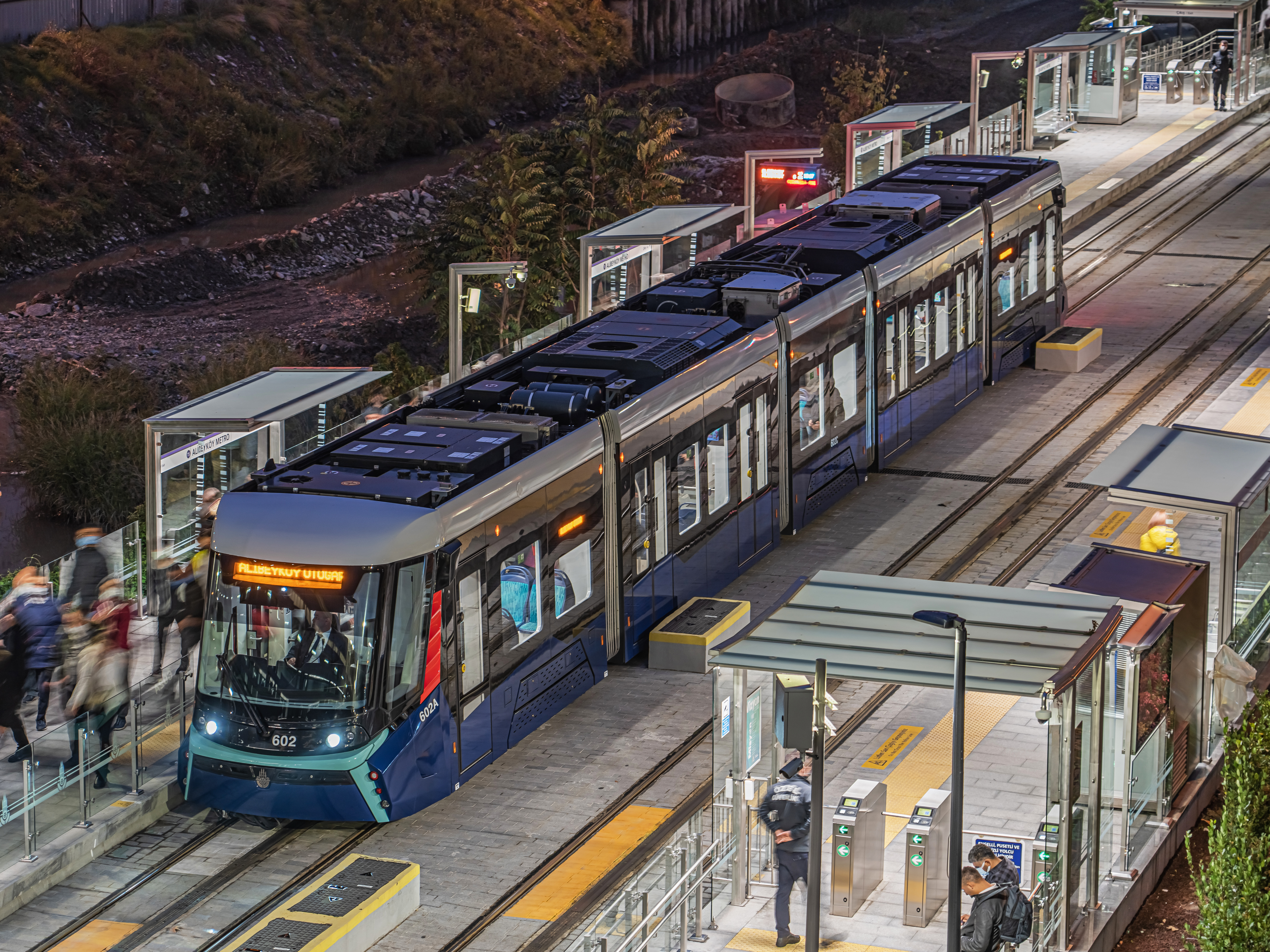

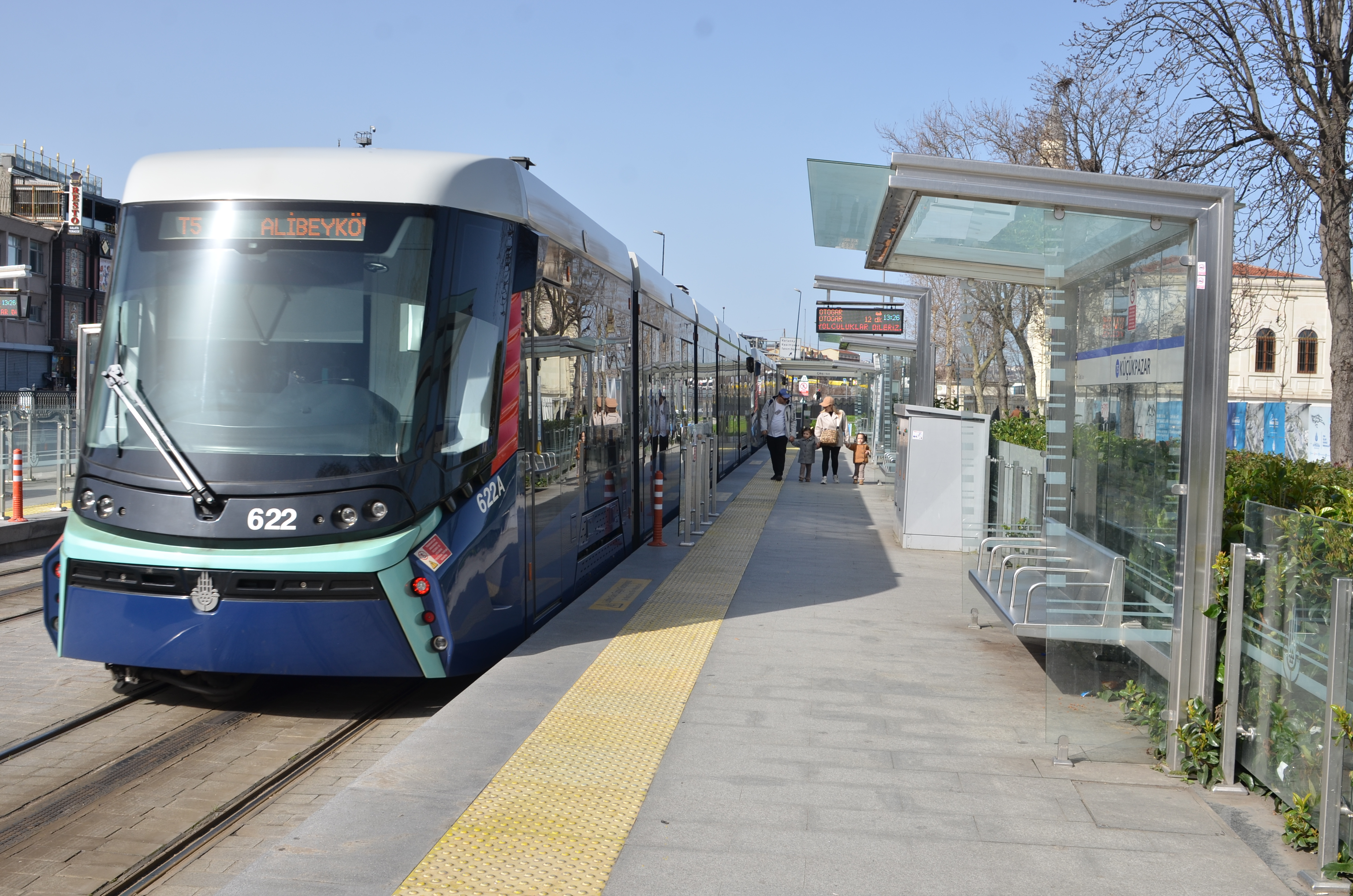

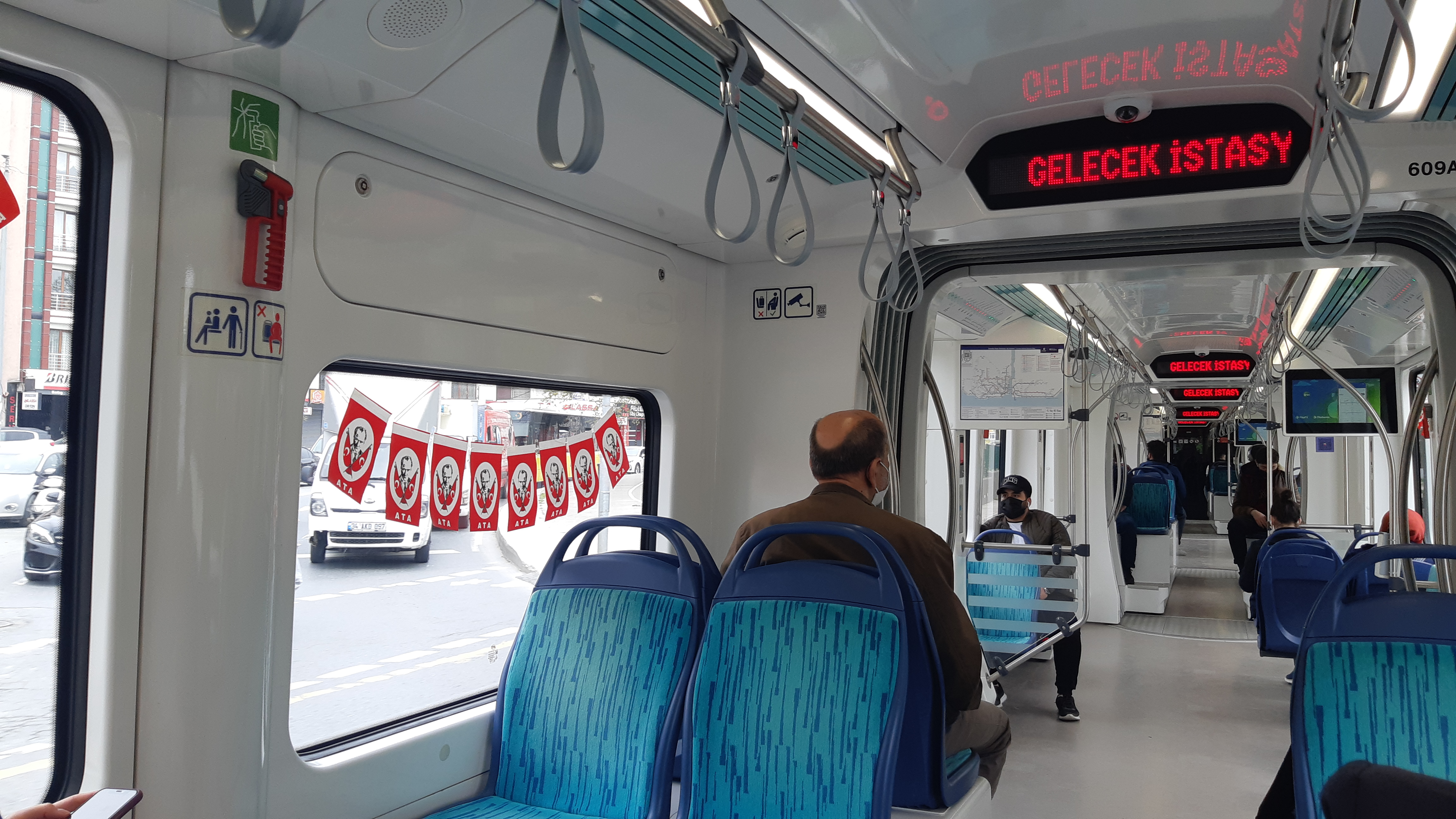

=== Olsztyn ===
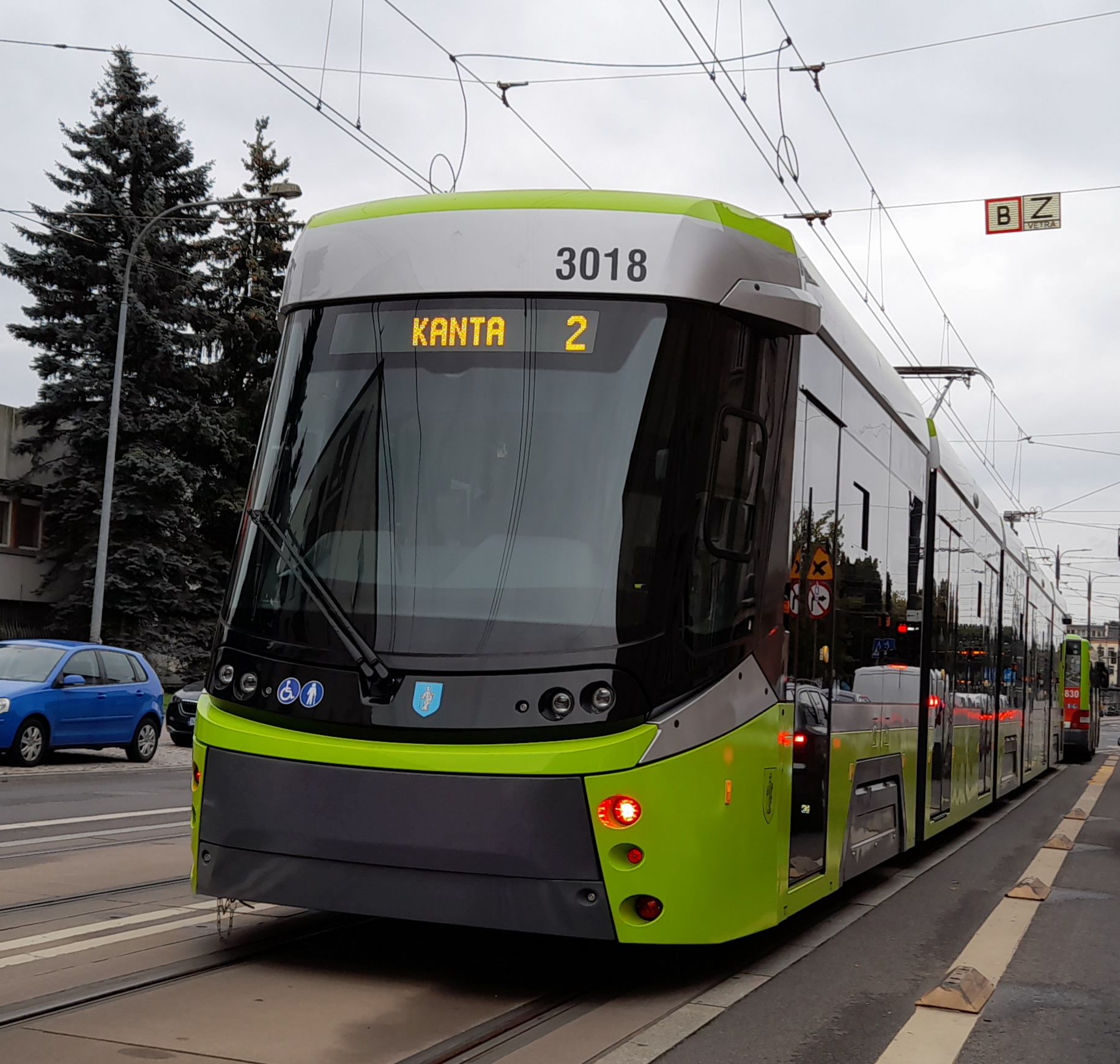

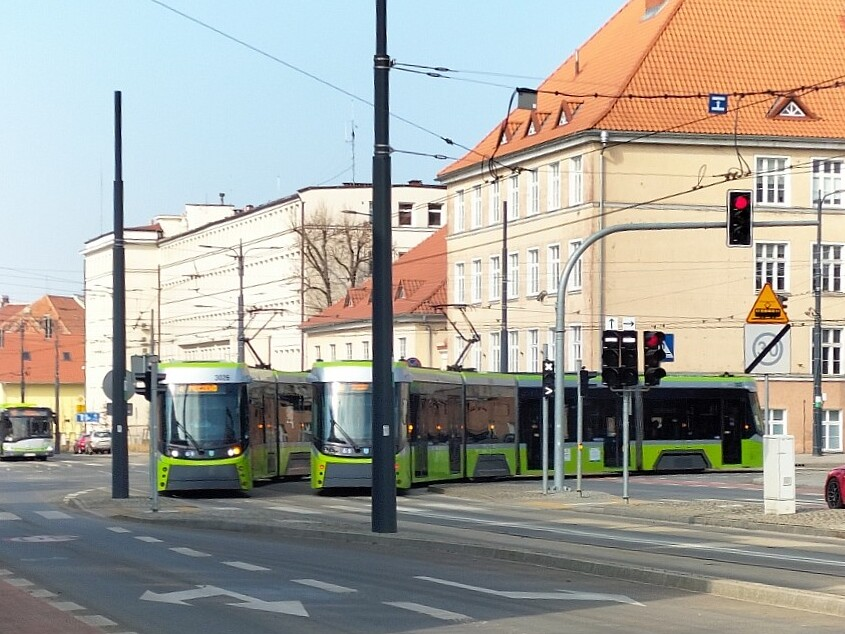

=== Samsun ===
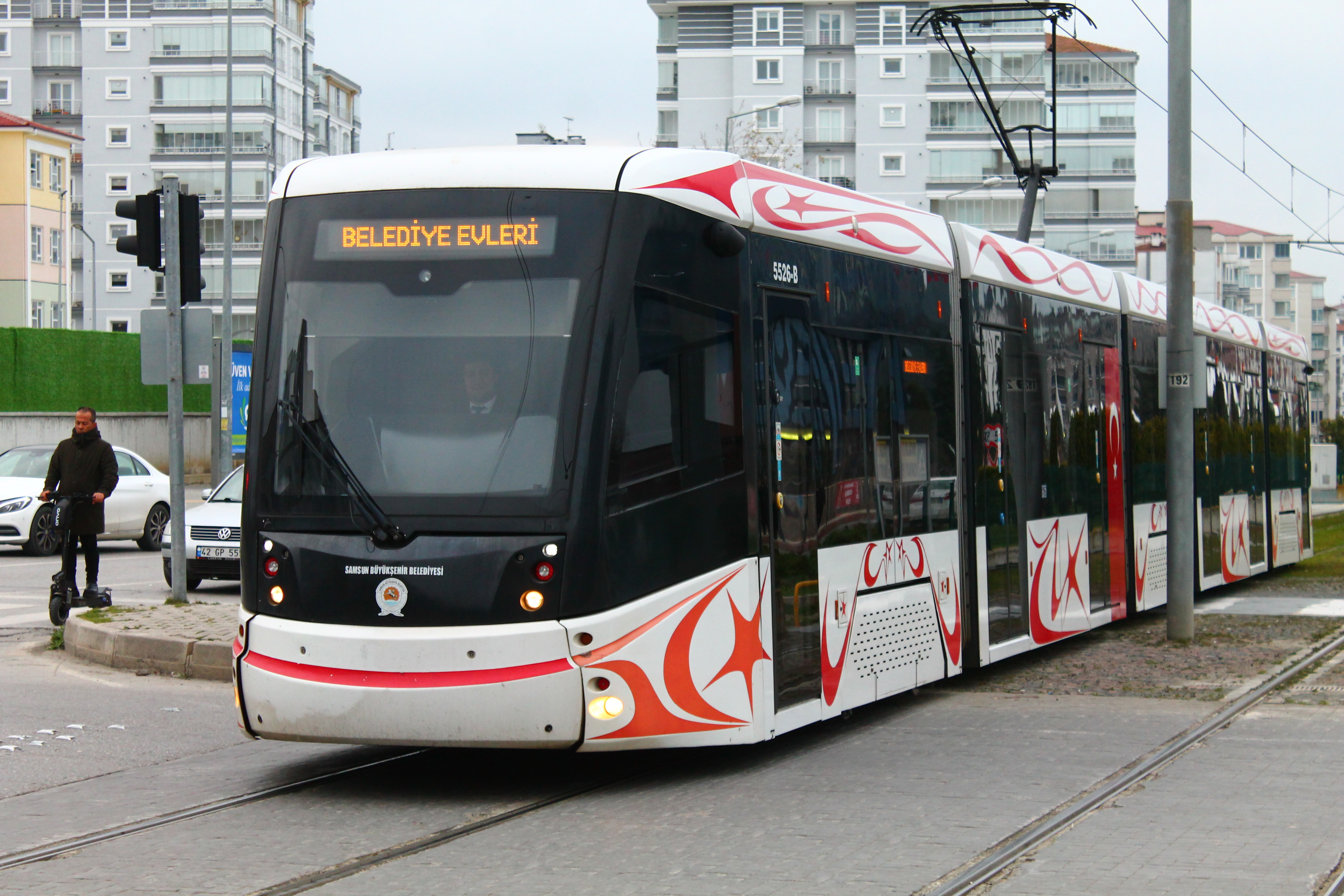
