= Reims tramway =

French tram system

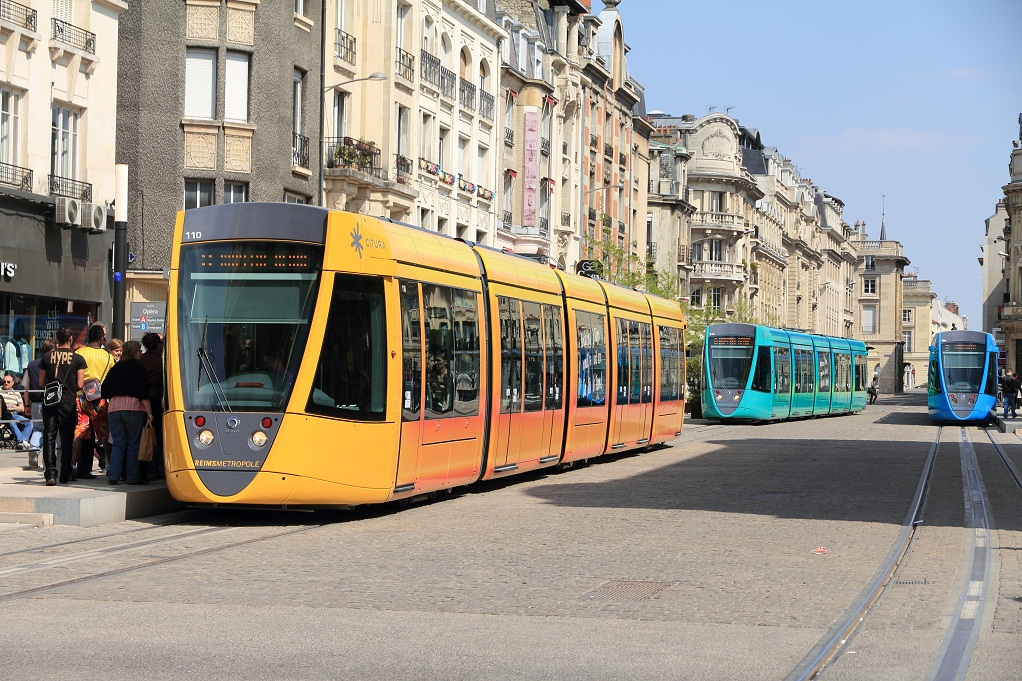

Overview
- Native name: Tramway de Reims
- Locale: Reims
- Transit type: Tram
- Number of lines: 2
- Number of stations: 24
- Annual ridership: 14.03 million (2018)

Operation
- Began operation: 18 April 2011; 15 years ago
- Operator: Transdev Reims

Technical
- System length: 11.2 km (7.0 mi)
- Track gauge: 1,435 mm (4 ft 8 1/2 in) standard gauge
- Electrification: Overhead line and APS third rail, 750 V DC

Reims tramway (French: Tramway de Reims) is a tram system in the French city of Reims, which opened in April 2011. It travels north to south, through the city, along 11.2 kilometres (7.0 mi) of route.

== Operation and routes ==
The system has 24 stops, with a further two planned for the future.

Two services run on the system:

- T1 – This 9.05-kilometre (5.62 mi), 21 station service runs from the Neuchâtel terminus in the northern Orgeval neighbourhood, to the southern terminus of Hôpital Debré, passing through the city centre, past the central railway station and the Reims Cathedral. The trams on this service run approximately every five to six minutes.
- T2 – This 11-kilometre (6.8 mi), 22 station service follows nearly the same route as T1, running from the Neuchâtel terminus, through the city centre. A short distance before the terminus of T1, it turns 90 degrees and continues south to reach the Champagne-Ardenne TGV station at Bezannes. The trams on this service run approximately every 22 minutes.

== Rolling stock ==
The 18 trams used on the line are Alstom Citadis 302. They consist of five body sections and have capacity for 205 passengers, with 56 seated.

The line uses the Alstom APS, a third rail system for 1.9 kilometres (1.2 mi) around Reims Cathedral, minimising visual intrusion in the historic city centre. This ground-level power supply system, pioneered by the Tramway de Bordeaux, allows the trams to be powered by a ground level third rail instead of overhead power lines.

The vehicle design evokes a Champagne flute, as Reims is the centre of the Champagne region. The livery is the work of famous designer Ruedi Baur and is based around the concept of colours. Each vehicle has its own pastel colour from a total selection of eight. The insides of the vehicles are coloured the same as the outsides.

== History ==
Initial studies into the potential of a tramway began in 2003, as a consequence of an overcrowded bus network and the impacts this was having on the historic centre of Reims.

In July 2006, financing, construction and management of the future line was delegated to a private concessionary consortium, called MARS (Mobility in the Agglomeration of ReimS). This €1.4 billion public private partnership was unique in France at the time. This consortium is composed of the vehicles' builder Alstom, the network operator Transdev, five roadwork enterprises and three pension funds.

Construction of the tramway began in May 2008, with the first tram arriving in March 2010, which allowed for testing and commissioning of the line in September 2010.

The line opened on 16 April 2011, with a cost of €305m.

== See also ==
- Trams in France
- List of town tramway systems in France

== Bibliography ==
- Local papers: Ville de Reims Information (official magazine of Ville de Reims), Reims Métropole Magazine (official magazine of the agglomeration), L'Hebdo du Vendredi (free private weekly), L'Union (private daily)
- Documents of the public inquest
- Connaissance du Rail (bimonthly specialized magazine), special tramways number of October - November 2007
- Plus d'un siècle de transports en commun à Reims, Marcel Chenu & Michel Jailliard, 1990, ISBN 2-9505172-0-X
