= Trams in Olsztyn =

Public transport in Olsztyn, Poland

Coordinates: 53.7807°N 20.509°E

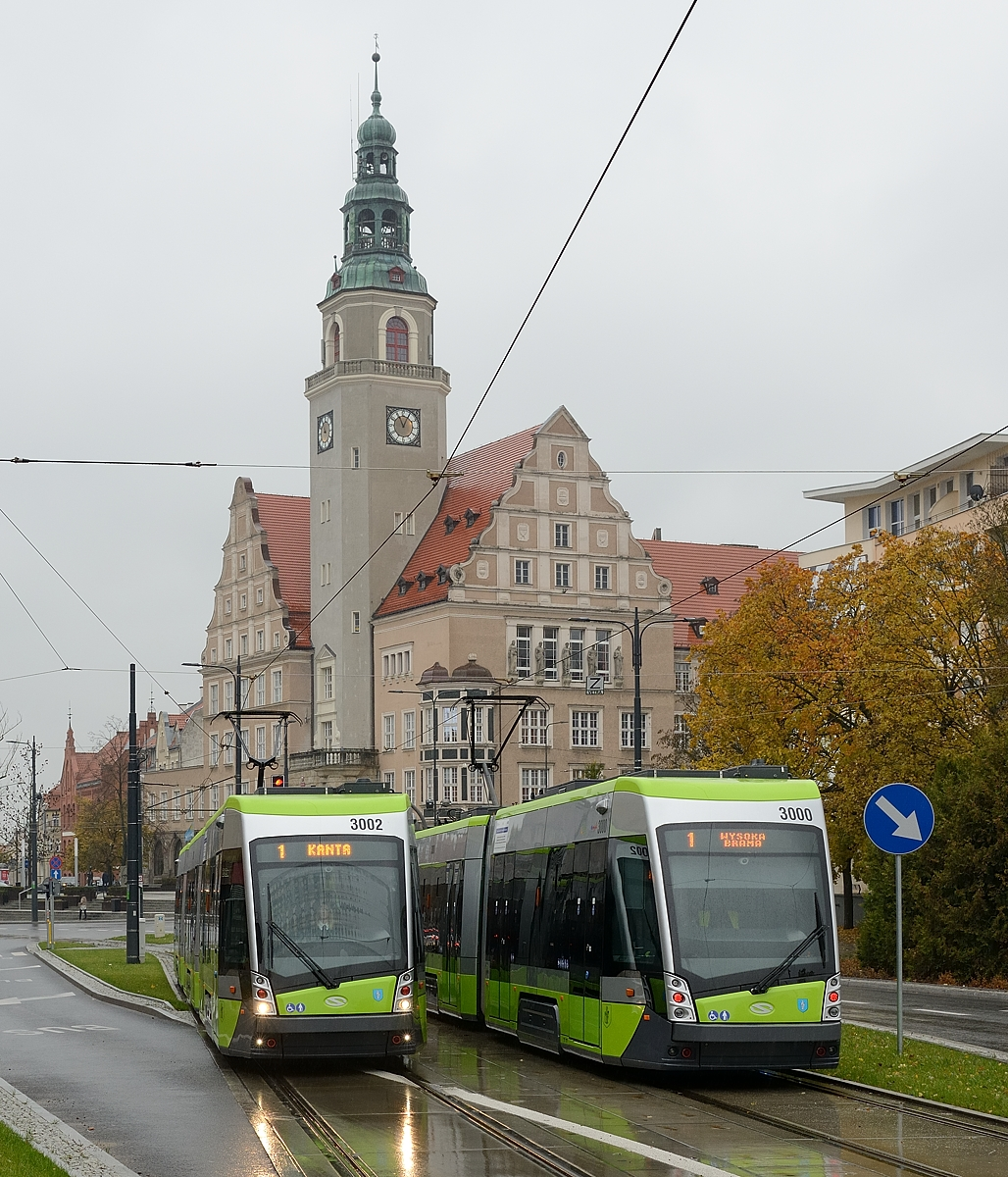
- Solaris Tramino trams in front of the New Town Hall

Operation
- Open: 19 December 2015
- Lines: 5
- Operator: MPK Olsztyn Sp. z o.o.

Infrastructure
- Track gauge: 1,435 mm (4 ft 8 1/2 in) standard gauge
- Electrification: 600 V DC
- Stock: 27

Statistics
- Route length: 17 km (11 mi)
- Stops: 32
Overview
- thin line indicates single track section
- Website: https://www.zdzit.olsztyn.eu/

The tram network in Olsztyn, Poland, is operated by the city-owned Olsztyn Municipal Transport Company (Polish: Miejskie Przedsiębiorstwo Komunikacyjne Olsztyn) Sp. z o.o. The system contains five lines. The network operates 27 trams, acquired in two orders of 15 and 12, respectively. The rolling stock was manufactured by the Polish company Solaris Bus & Coach and the Turkish company Durmazlar. The current tram system began construction in September 2012, and revenue service began in December 2015. A separate tram system operated from 1907 to 1965, when it was replaced by bus service. The new Olsztyn tram network is one of two networks built in Poland after World War II (the other being the Częstochowa tram network, opened in 1959) and the only one to be rebuilt after being dismantled, although its routes do not follow those of the pre-1965 network.

== History ==
=== Former system ===
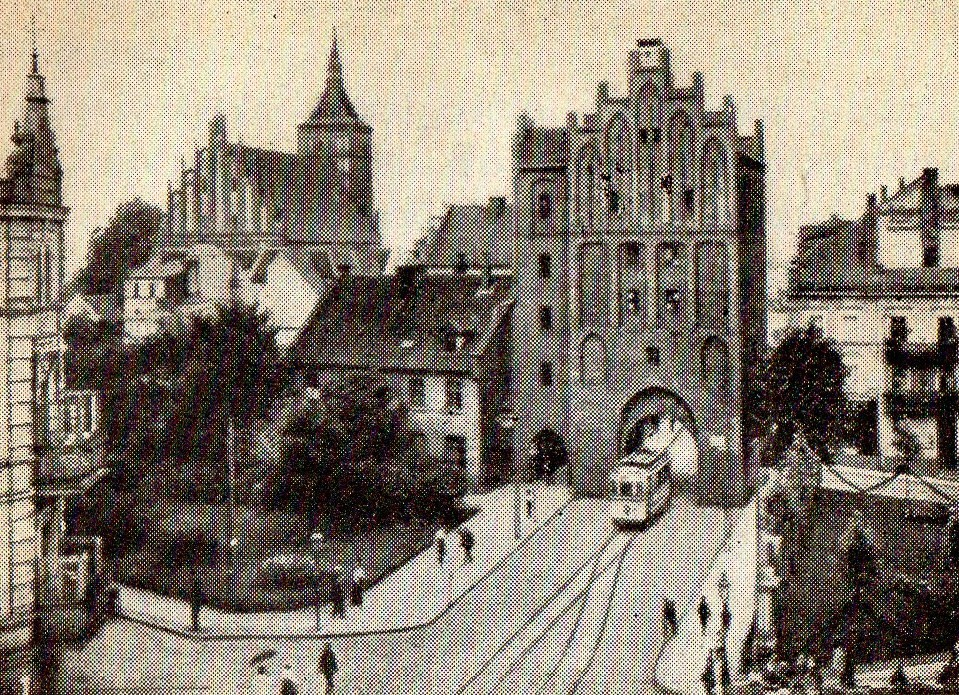
A tram of the old system at Wysoka Brama in 1947

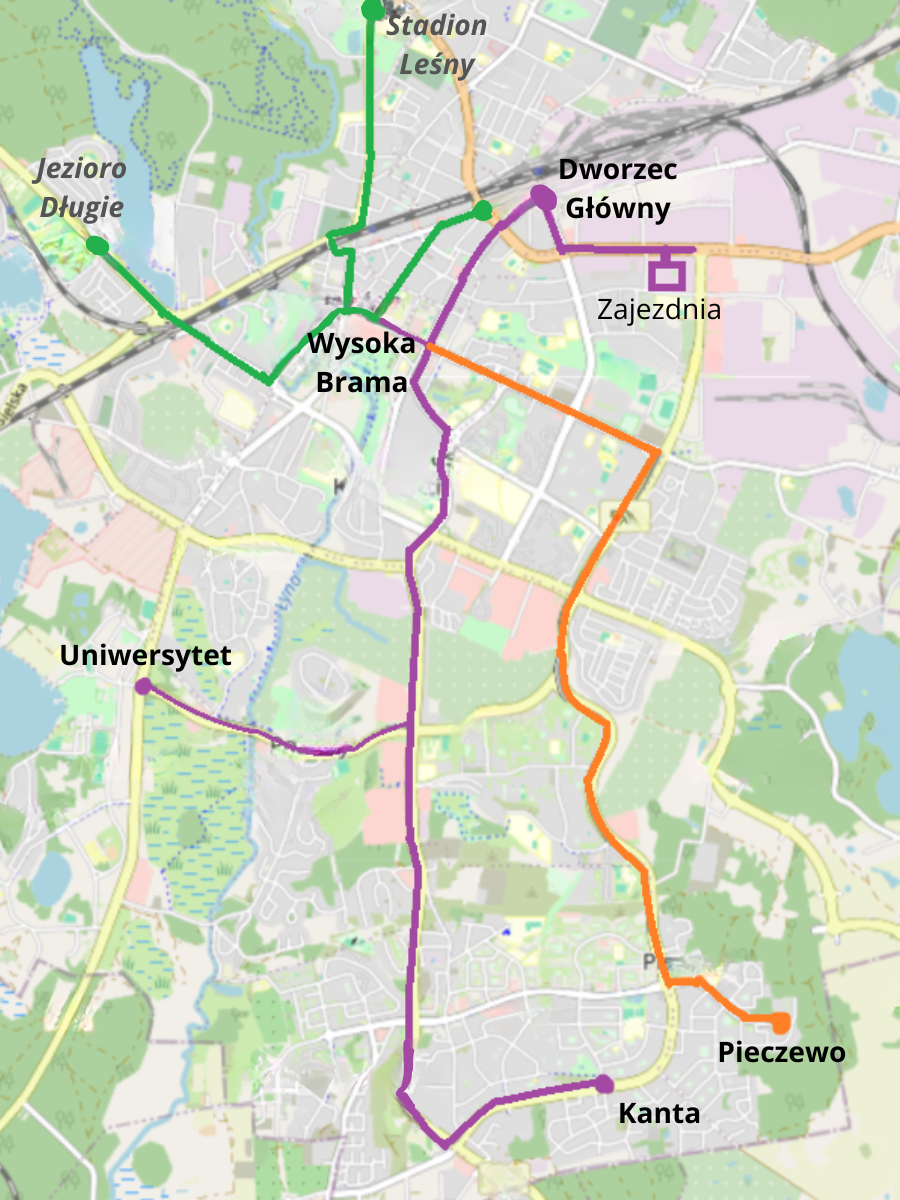
Olsztyn tram network. Lines in green are the old network, lines in violet are opened in 2015, lines in orange are new-opened in 2023.

Trams in Olsztyn (then Allenstein, East Prussia, German Empire) first ran in December 1907. The network was entirely single track, 1,000 mm (3 ft 3 3/8 in) metre gauge, and powered by 600 V DC overhead lines. It consisted of two routes: route 1 connecting Olsztyn Główny railway station with Plac Roosevelta (then Hauptbahnhof–Remontemarkt) through Old Town and Wysoka Brama (then Hohes Tor) and route 2 connecting 1 Maja with Jakubowo (along Wojska Polskiego near the Forest Stadium, then Guttstädter Straße–Jakobsberg, Waldstadion). A depot and a traction substation powering the tram network was located on this route not far from the railway line, and another depot was built near the Jakubowo terminus.

In 1930, the network was extended. Route 1's terminus was moved from Olsztyn Zachodni to Jeziorna (then Jahnweg) on the shore of Długie Lake (then Lang See). At the same time, the track between Jagiełły and Dworzec Zachodni was lifted. In 1940, trolleybus route 2 was inaugurated leading to the discontinuation of tram route 2. From then until 1945, only route number 1 remained in operation.

In March 1945, the front closed on the city and all public transport was suspended. The system suffered extensive damage as a result of the fighting. As part of the Yalta agreement, the southern part of East Prussia became part of Poland. The network and rolling stock needed extensive renovation, but trams on route 1 resumed operation on 30 April 1946 and on route 2 on 28 June 1946. There were no more changes to the network until the end of operation.

The trams last ran on 20 November 1965. The system was closed down because it required major investment that the city could not afford and bus transport was a more economical solution.

=== Current system ===
In 2004, the city authorities started considering building a completely new tram network. The project was approved in 2009 and, after bids by five companies, the construction contract was awarded to the Spanish firm FCC Construcción on 27 June 2011, for approximately 250 million Polish złoty (€60.7 million). Construction started in September 2012 and was scheduled to be completed in June 2014. The system was opened in stages between 19 and 31 December 2015.

An extension to Pieczewo in southeastern Olsztyn was opened on 30 December 2023 with the introduction of Line 4. The depot was expanded to have the capacity for 16 additional trams.

=== Future plans ===
Several projects are planned for Olsztyn's tram network:

- Extension of the network in the southern part of the city, near the railway station and to the west (into the Kortowo university campus).
- New Wysoka Brama terminus with a door-to-door tram-bus interchange (planned from the beginning but not built due to archaeological works on site).

== Network ==
The standard gauge network connects the main railway station with the south of the city, with branches to the edge of Old Town and the University. The network is mostly double-tracked, with the branch to Uniwersytet-Prawocheńskiego and a short stretch near the Wysoka Brama being single tracks. There are no balloon loops and all vehicles are bi-directional. Most of the network runs along separate right of way but all intersections are level crossings. Intersections with major roads are controlled by traffic lights. The intelligent transport system affords priority to trams.

There are 32 stations on the tram network along its total length of 17 km (11 mi). Trams operate at intervals of 7 and 10 minutes on weekdays, and of 10 to 15 minutes on weekends.

=== Routes ===
Five lines operate on the network, with lines 4 and 5 being launched on 30 December 2023 and 1 January 2024 respectively. All five lines have portions that overlap with at least another line.

| Daily | 1, 2, 4, 5 |
| Weekdays only | 3 |

All trams run daily on 15 minute intervals with the exception of Line 3, which only runs on Weekdays every 30 minutes. The other 4 lines run every 20-30 minutes on weekends and holidays.

| Line | Route | Length | Stops | Frequency |
|---|---|---|---|---|
| 1 | Wysoka Brama ↔ Kanta | 6.8 km (4.2 mi) | 13 | Weekdays 15; Weekends 20-30 |
| 2 | Dworzec Główny ↔ Kanta | 7.4 km (4.6 mi) | 14 | Weekdays 10-15; Weekends 15-30 |
| 3 | Dworzec Główny ↔ Uniwersytet-Prawocheńskiego | 5.4 km (3.4 mi) | 11 | Weekdays 30 |
| Linia_4_Olsztyn | Dworzec Główny ↔ Pieczewo | 6.25 km (3.88 mi) | 16 | Weekdays 15; Weekends 15-30 |
| Linia_5_Olsztyn | Wysoka Brama ↔ Pieczewo | 6.9 km (4.3 mi) | 15 | Weekdays 15; Weekends 20-30 |

== Rolling stock ==
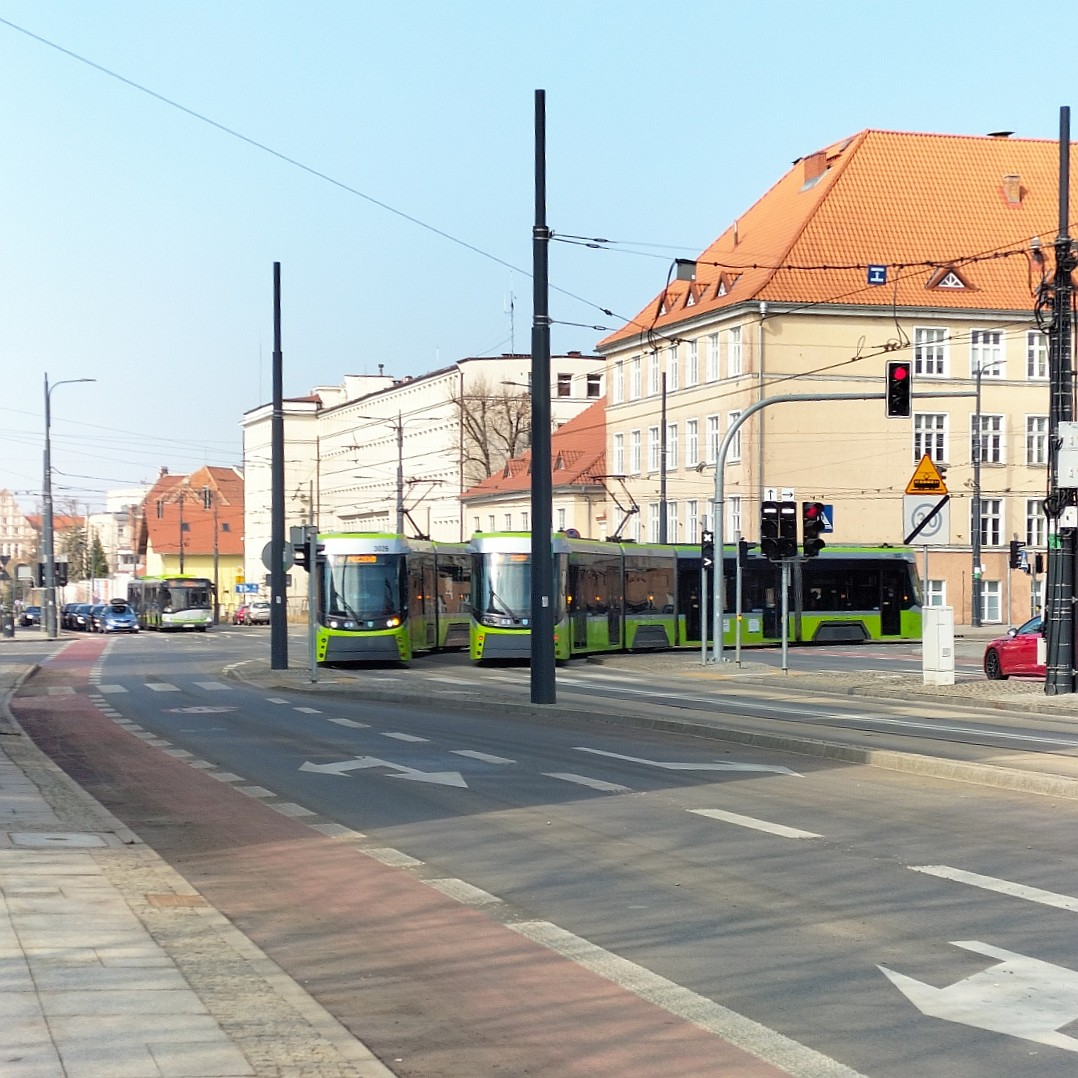
Durmazlar Panorama trams in Olsztyn

The Olsztyn tram network operates 27 trams. The first set of fifteen was manufactured by Solaris Bus & Coach of Poland, while the second set of twelve was manufactured in Turkey by Durmazlar (Durmaray). All vehicles are fully accessible, are air-conditioned, and are equipped with ticket vending machines and free WiFi.

| Manufacturer | Type | Image | Number | Delivered | Capacity |
|---|---|---|---|---|---|
| Solaris | Tramino S111o | A green and gray tram | 15 | 2015 | 243 |
| Durmazlar | Panorama DRP5H05 | A green and gray tram | 12 | 2020–2022 | 210 |
