= T5 (Istanbul Tram) =

Tram line in Istanbul, Turkey

T5 Eminönü–Alibeyköy Coach Station

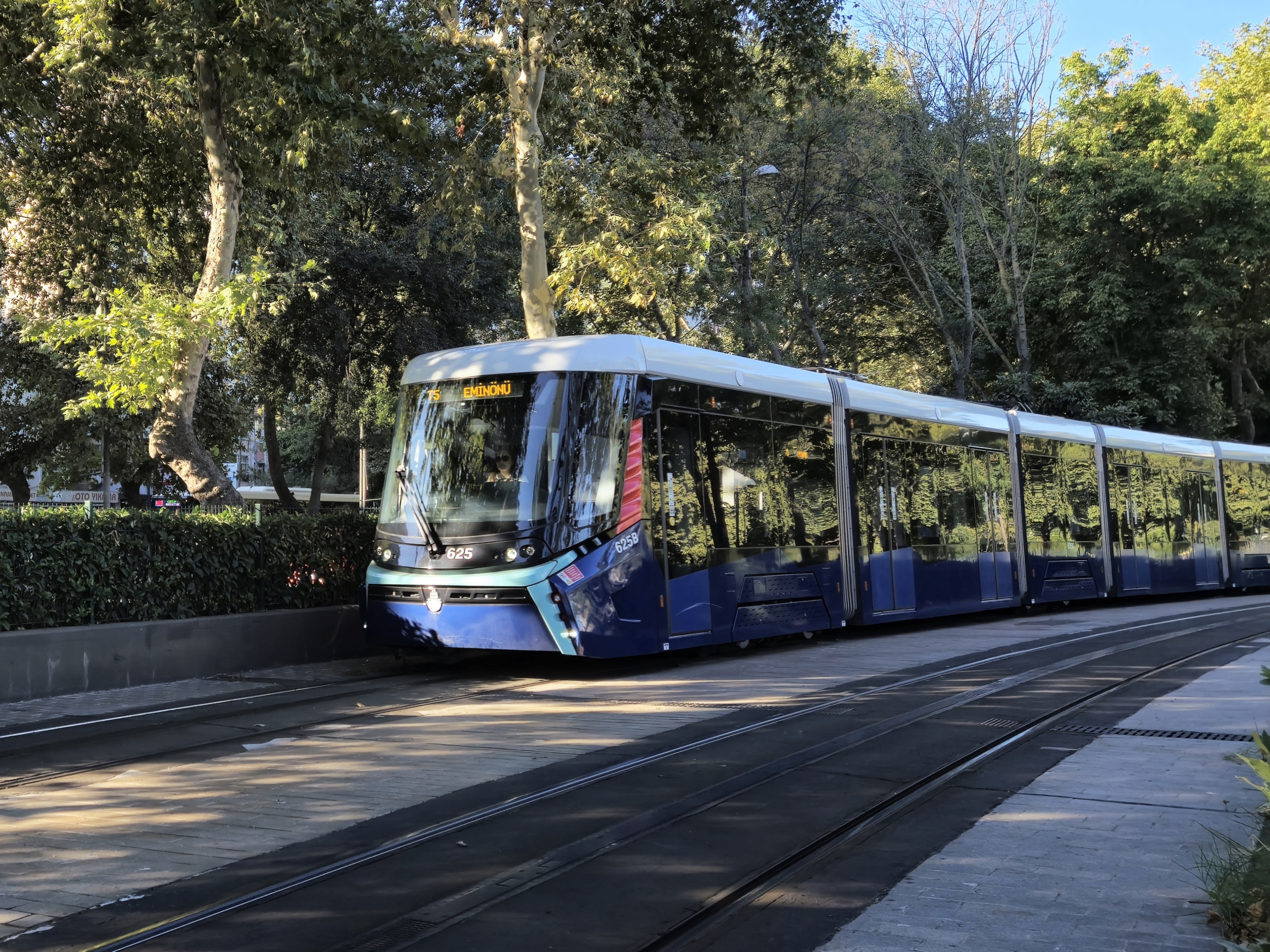

Overview
- Status: Operational (Eminönü-Alibeyköy Coach Station)
- Locale: Istanbul
- Termini: Eminönü; Alibeyköy Coach Station
- Stations: 14

Service
- Type: Tram
- System: Istanbul Tram
- Operator: Metro Istanbul
- Depot: Alibeyköy Coach Station
- Rolling stock: 30
- Daily ridership: 114,000

History
- Opened: 1 January 2021; 5 years ago (First section); 30 August 2023; 2 years ago (Last section)
- (Eminönü - Alibeyköy Coach Station): Operational

Technical
- Track length: 10.1 km (6.3 mi)
- Track gauge: 1,435 mm (4 ft 8 1/2 in) standard gauge
- Electrification: Third rail (Alstom APS)
- Operating speed: 20–45 km/h (12–28 mph)

The T5 Eminönü–Alibeyköy Coach Station tram line (Turkish: T5 Eminönü–Alibeyköy Cep Otogarı tramvay hattı) is a tram line following the coastline of the Golden Horn on the European side of Istanbul, Turkey.

Construction of the line began in March 2017, with the first test runs starting in March 2019. The first section consisting of 12 stations between Cibali and Alibeyköy Coach Station at a length of 8.8 km (5.5 mi) was officially opened on 1 January 2021, and the extension to Eminönü was officially opened on 30 August 2023.

The line is 10.1 km (6.3 mi) long with 14 stations each 60 m (196 ft 10 in) of length. 30 Durmazlar Panorama trams carry up to 114,000 passengers a day. Its route mostly follows the western coastline of the Golden Horn, and is built on the bank next to the existing street. In some places, it crosses the water on piles. The total travel time was assumed to be 35 minutes.

The line uses Alstom APS (a third rail embedded in the ground between the tracks) for electrification to avoid visual pollution, a difference from other tram lines in the city, which have traditional overhead wires suspended from roadside posts.

== Stations and connections ==
The 14 stations and their connections to other lines are as following: All stations are at ground level.

No	Station	District	Transfer	Notes
1	Eminönü	Fatih	・ (Eminönü ferry); İETT Bus: 26, 26A, 28, 28T, 30D, 31E, 32, 33, 33B, 33ES, 33TE, 33Y, 35, 36KE, 38E, 46Ç, 50E, 50P, 54E, 54TE, 66, 70D, 70FE, 70KE, 74, 74A, 77Ç, 78, 78H, 79E, 79GE, 82, 90, 92, 92C, 93, 97A, 97GE, 99A, 146B, 336, 336E, BN1, EM1, EM2	Spice Bazaar・Galata Bridge・New Mosque
2	Küçükpazar	Fatih	(Haliç station); İETT Bus: 26, 26A, 28, 28T, 30D, 31E, 32, 33, 33B, 33ES, 33TE, 33Y, 35, 36KE, 38E, 46Ç, 50E, 50P, 54E, 54TE, 66, 70D, 70FE, 70KE, 74, 74A, 77Ç, 78, 78H, 79E, 79GE, 82, 90, 92, 92C, 93, 97A, 97GE, 99A, BN1, EM1, EM2	Haliç Metro Bridge
3	Cibali	Fatih	İETT Bus: 33ES, 55G, 55T, 99A	Kadir Has University Cibali Campus
4	Fener	Fatih	(Fener ferry); İETT Bus: 33ES, 35D, 55G, 55T, 99A	Yavuz Sultan Selim Mosque
5	Balat	Fatih	(Balat ferry); İETT Bus: 33ES, 35D, 55G, 55T, 99A	
6	Ayvansaray	Fatih	(Ayvansaray ferry); İETT Bus: 33ES, 55G, 55T, 99A	It is approximately 1 km (0.62 mi) from Ayvansaray Metrobus Station.
7	Feshane	Eyüpsultan	(Eyüpsultan ferry); İETT Bus: 50B, 50K, 50R, 50V, 50Y, 55, 55G, 55T, 86V, TM14	Eyüp Sultan Mosque・Artistanbul Feshane・Zal Mahmud Paşa Mosque
8	Eyüpsultan Teleferik	Eyüpsultan	İETT Bus: 50B, 50R, 50K, 50V, 50Y, 86V, TM14	Eyüp Sultan Mosque・Eyüpsultan Mezarlığı・Pierre Loti
9	Eyüpsultan Devlet Hastanesi	Eyüpsultan	İETT Bus: 50B, 50R, 50K, 50V, 50Y, TM14	Eyüpsultan Country Hospital
10	Silahtarağa Mahallesi	Eyüpsultan	İETT Bus: 50B, 50R, 50K, 50V, 50Y, 55Y, TM14, TM16	Santralistanbul・İstanbul Bilgi Üniversitesi Santralistanbul Kampüsü・Silahtarağa Yeni Camii
11	Üniversite	Eyüpsultan	İETT Bus: 50B, 50K, 50R, 50V, 50Y, 55Y, TM14, TM16	Bezmialem Foundation University Eyüpsultan Campus・Silahtarağa Merkez Camii・İstanbul Bilgi University Santralistanbul Campus
12	Alibeyköy Merkez	Eyüpsultan	İETT Bus: 50A, 50B, 50C, 50D, 50E, 50G, 50K, 50L, 50M, 50N, 50R, 50S, 50T, 50V, 50Y, 55Y, TM3, TM8, TM10, TM12, TM14, TM15, TM18, TM19	Alibeyköy Camii
13	Alibeyköy Metro	Eyüpsultan	(Alibeyköy station); İETT Bus: 50A, 50AT, 50B, 50C, 50D, 50E, 50F, 50G, 50H, 50K, 50L, 50M, 50N, 50R, 50S, 50T, 50V, 50Y, 50Z, TM1, TM2, TM3, TM4, TM5, TM6, TM7, TM8, TM9, TM10, TM11, TM12, TM13, TM14, TM15, TM16, TM17, TM18, TM19	
14	Alibeyköy Cep Otogarı	Eyüpsultan	İETT Bus: TM5, TM11, TM17	Alibeyköy Cep Bus Terminal・5. Levent

== See also ==
- Istanbul Tram
- Istanbul Metro
- Istanbul nostalgic tramways
- Public transport in Istanbul
- Haliç
