= Akçaray =

Tram network in Izmit, Turkey

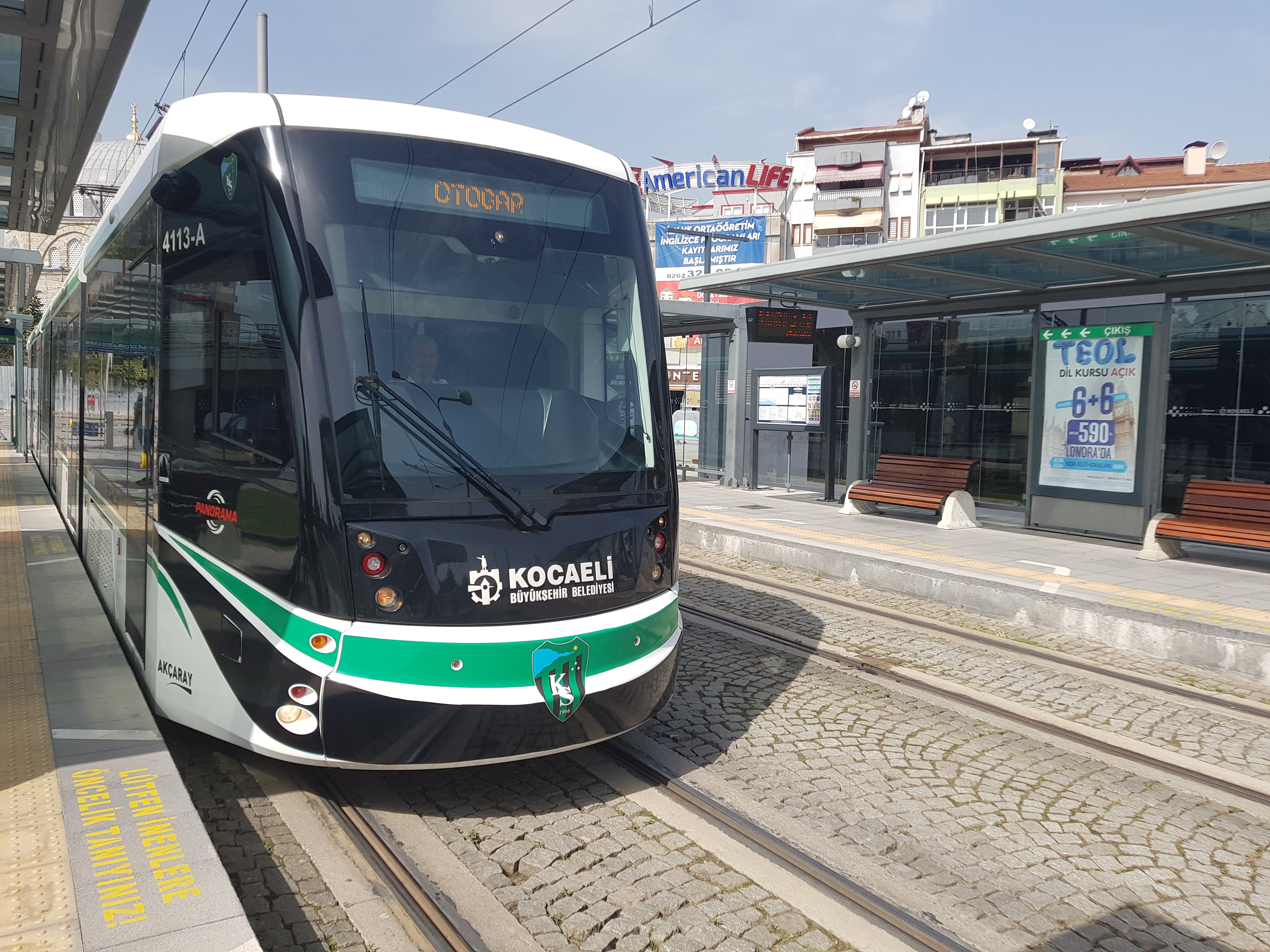
- A Durmazlar Panorama tram at Yeni Cuma station, 2020

Overview
- Owner: Kocaeli Metropolitan Municipality
- Locale: Izmit, Kocaeli, Turkey
- Transit type: Light Rail
- Number of lines: 2
- Number of stations: 24
- Daily ridership: 26,400
- Website: https://www.ulasimpark.com.tr/tramway

Operation
- Began operation: 17 June 2017; 9 years ago
- Operator: Ulaşım Park A.Ş.
- Number of vehicles: 29
- Train length: 33 m

Technical
- System length: 17.6 kilometres (10.9 mi)
- Track gauge: 1435 mm

Akçaray is a tramway network serving İzmit, the capital of Kocaeli Province in Turkey with a population of 367,990. İzmit and Kocaeli are part of Turkey's industrial heartland, situated to the east of Istanbul and on the north coast of the Marmara Sea. It has the distinction of being the first and currently the only tramway line in the province of Kocaeli and one of two mass transit lines with the construction of the Gebze Metro.

Akçaray while moving

== History ==
The first tender for the preparation of Akçaray implementation projects was held in January 2014. In the following days, a public vote on the name and color of the tramway line was announced by the Kocaeli Metropolitan and Izmit Municipalities. A tramway wagon was brought to the Anıtpark Square in İzmit and showcased by drawing electricity with a cable.

The tender for the construction of the line was held on May 20, 2015. The general contracting firm Gülermak won the tender for 113 million 990 thousand TL. The groundbreaking ceremony of the project took place on October 19, 2015. Construction work took place between October 2015 and June 2017 when the line opened for public use. During the design phase of the line, controversy arose around plans to repurpose an old railway right of way that had been converted into a pedestrian path into one for the new tramway route.

=== First phase ===
The network was put into service with a ceremony on June 17, 2017, with service running every 20 minutes, and on 11 stations spanning the 7.4 km (4.6 mi) distance between Otogar and Sekapark. At the opening ceremony, the National Defense Minister Fikri Işık announced that the line would be free of charge until July 15, 2017. Headways were reduced to every 15 minutes, 4 days after the line's opening. The frequency of trains was arranged to be between 5 and 15 minutes (depending on the hours of the day) with the start of the school term in September.

=== Second phase ===
The first 4 stations of the Sekapark to Plajyolu section, the second phase of the line, were put into service on February 9, 2019. The tender for the extension line to Kuruçeşme was held in 2020. The extension was opened on April 20, 2023.

After the opening of the second stage of the line, it was announced that a free transfer agreement was signed with the cooperatives in the region for the 4 lines in the Alikahya neighborhood towards the Otogar direction.

The third stage of the line, consisting of a 3.1 km (1.9 mi) branch line from Mehmet Ali Paşa station on the existing line north to Şehir Hastanesi station, opened on 17 March 2024. A further 2.6 km (1.6 mi) extension of the line east from Otogar to Kocaeli Stadyum opened on 14 October 2025. On 15 September 2026, the line reached Kartepe as the result of a two-station 1.4 km (0.87 mi) long extension.

The 33-metre (108 ft)-long vehicles in service have a total capacity of 290 passengers, including 50 seats and 240 standing. The line, which was opened in June 2017, carried 23 million passengers between the date of its opening and November 2019.

== Stations ==
Station	Opening Date	Notes
Kartepe	15 September 2026	
Dumlupınar	15 September 2026	
Kocaeli Stadyum	14 October 2025	
Alikahya Kültür Merkezi	14 October 2025	
Alikahya Merkez	14 October 2025	
Alikahya Fatih	14 October 2025	
Sabancı MTAL	14 October 2025	
Yuvam Akarca	14 October 2025	
Otogar	June 17, 2017	Izmit Coach Station
Yahyakaptan	June 17, 2017	Arastapark Mall
Yenişehir	June 17, 2017	
Mehmet Ali Paşa	June 17, 2017	
Doğu Kışla	June 17, 2017	East Barracks Youth Park
Millî İrade Meydanı	June 17, 2017	Izmit National Square, İzmit Monument Park
Fuar	June 17, 2017	Kocaeli Fair
Yeni Cuma	June 17, 2017	Sabanci Cultural Center, Kocaeli Metropolitan Municipality Offices
Fevziye	June 17, 2017	
Gar	June 17, 2017	İzmit Train Station
Sekapark	June 17, 2017	Seka Park, SEKA Paper Museum
Seka Devlet Hastanesi	February 9, 2019	İzmit Seka State Hospital
Kongre Merkezi	February 9, 2019	Kocaeli Congress Center
Eğitim Kampüsü	February 9, 2019	Izmit High School
Plajyolu	February 9, 2019	
Kuruçeşme	April 20, 2023	
