= Solaris Tramino =

Family of trams initially produced by Solaris Bus & Coach

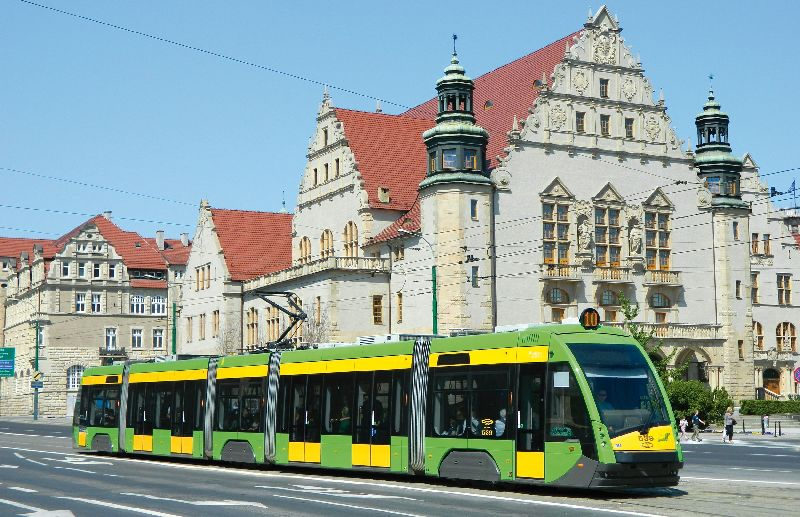
- Tramino S105p in Poznań
- Manufacturer: Solaris Bus & Coach; Solaris Tram; Stadler Polska
- Assembly: Środa Wielkopolska; Poznań; Siedlce
- Constructed: 2009–2022
- Number built: 152

Specifications
- Train length: 29,300–35,740 mm (1,154–1,407 in)
- Floor height: 350 mm (14 in)
- Low-floor: 65–100%
- Articulated sections: 3–5
- Maximum speed: 70 km/h (43 mph)

Solaris Tramino is a family of trams initially produced by Solaris Bus & Coach from Bolechowo near Poznań, and later by Stadler Polska (a branch of the Swiss company Stadler Rail) after it acquired Solaris Tram. The prototype was unveiled in July 2009, and the delivery of series trams took place between 2011 and 2022. A total of 152 trams were produced and put into service in Germany (Braunschweig, Jena, Leipzig) and Poland (Olsztyn and Poznań).

== History ==
The Solaris Tramino family was originally planned to consist of two fully low-floor variants: a 5-section version measuring 31.7 meters in length and a 3-section version measuring 18.8 meters. There was also the potential to build longer trams, bidirectional trams, or trams that were not fully low-floor. The first variant developed was the 5-section version. Design work began in 2008, and the construction of the tram body started in March 2009.

The Tramino prototype was developed in cooperation with Autosan and the Municipal Transport Company in Łódź. Autosan prepared the skeletons of all sections, and the assembly of the first Tramino took place in the halls belonging to the Municipal Transport Company in Łódź. The bodies of subsequent units were manufactured at the new Solaris plant in Środa Wielkopolska.

The first vehicles were intended to be delivered to Szczecin; however, the tender from early 2009 was canceled, and in the next tender, the company Pesa won.

=== Promotional presentations ===
The prototype tram was premiered on 14 October 2009 during the Trako fair in Gdańsk. The tram was also presented a year later at the InnoTrans fair in Berlin. In 2011, the Tramino for Poznań was showcased at the Trako fair, and in 2012 at the InnoTrans fair. In 2013, the Tramino for Jena premiered at the Trako fair, in 2014 the Tramino for Braunschweig was presented at InnoTrans, and in 2015 the Tramino for Olsztyn was shown at Trako. InnoTrans 2016 featured the Tramino for Olsztyn again, along with a model of the Tramino interior for Leipzig, while the completed tram for Leipzig was showcased a year later at the Trako fair in Gdańsk.

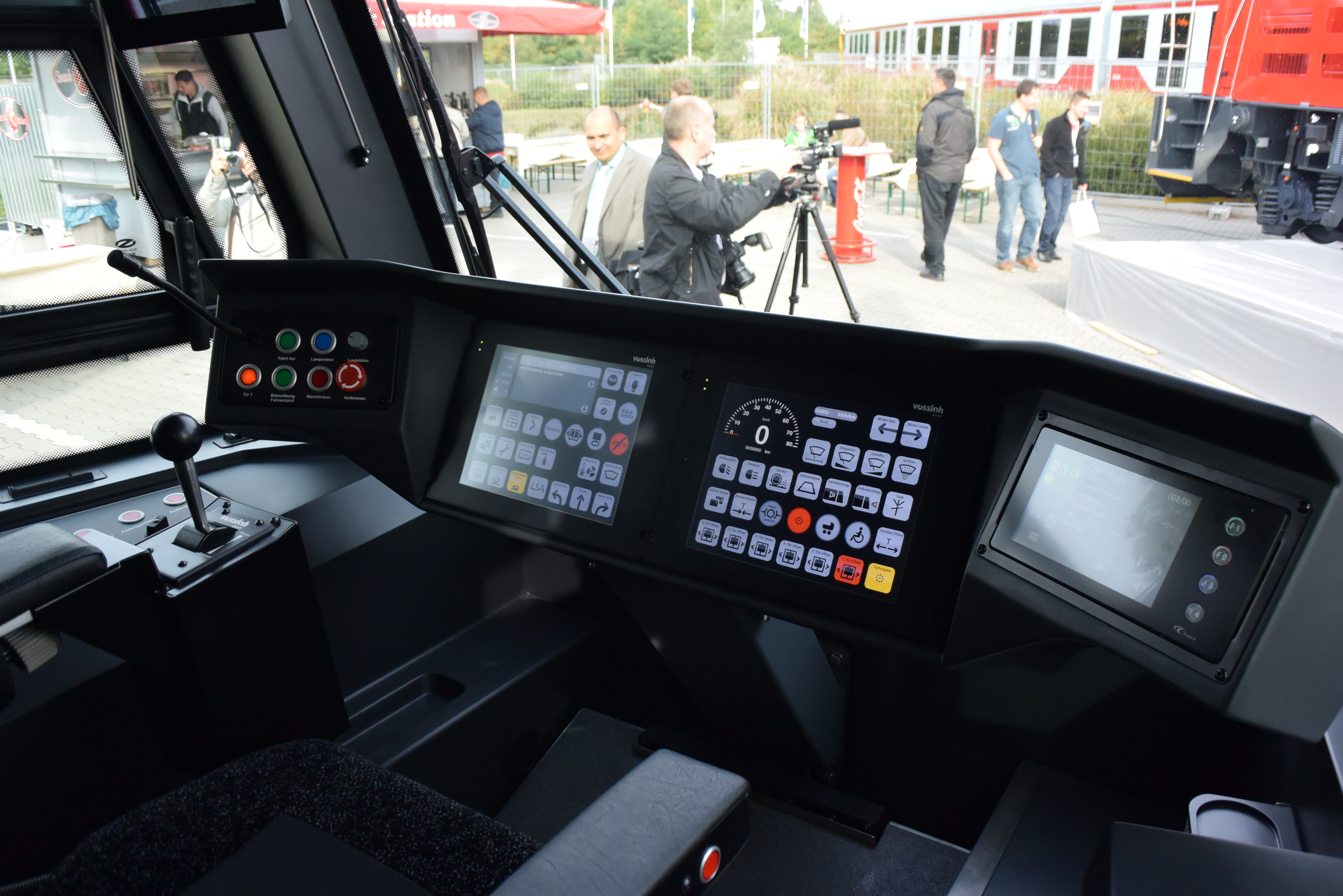
Driver's cabin in S110b

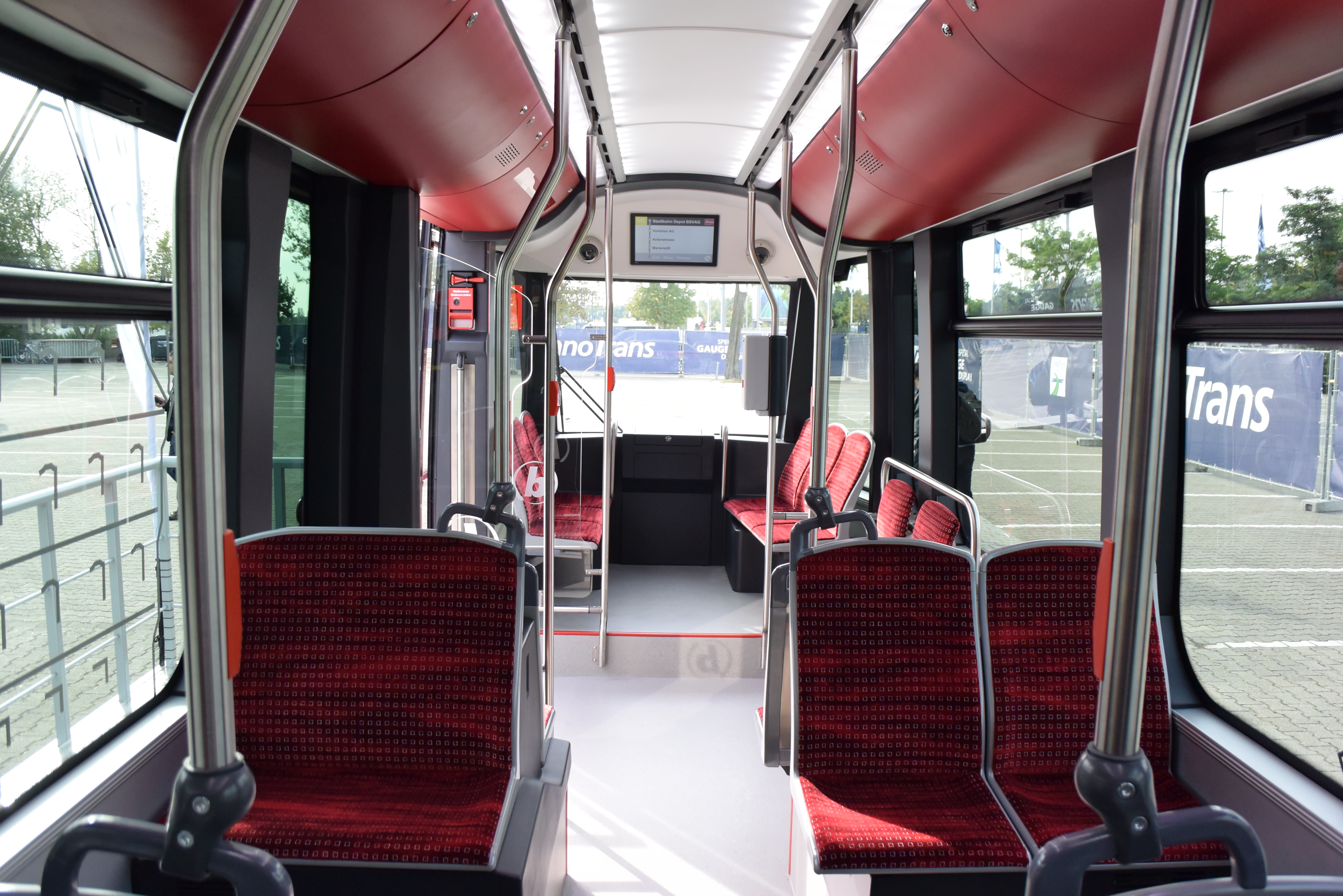
interior of S110b

=== Orders ===
- 23 November 2009 – contract signed for the delivery of 40 S105p trams for Poznań.
- 11 July 2011 – contract signed for the delivery of five S109j trams for Jena.
- 5 July 2012 – contract signed for the delivery of 15 S110b trams for Braunschweig.
- 21 September 2012 – contract signed for the delivery of 15 S111o trams for Olsztyn.
- 21 May 2013 – contract signed for the delivery of three more S110b trams for Braunschweig.
- 26 March 2015 – framework agreement signed for the delivery of 41 trams for Leipzig.
  - 26 March 2015 – execution contract signed for the delivery of five trams.
  - Q1 2016 – execution contract signed for the delivery of nine trams.
  - 22 September 2017 – execution contract signed for the delivery of nine trams.
  - 20 December 2018 – framework agreement extended for an additional 20 trams.
- 29 June 2017 – contract signed for the delivery of seven trams for Braunschweig.

=== Tests in other cities ===
On 17 February 2015, the prototype S100 was transported to Kraków's Nowa Huta depot for testing. The tests began on February 23 and lasted until August 30. During the tests, the Tramino operated on routes 1, 4, and 14, which lead to Nowa Huta.

In 2016, one of the Jena S109j trams was tested in regular service in Frankfurt (Oder). The tram was also showcased during the open day of the tram depot.

=== Production takeover by Stadler ===
On 1 April 2017, the Solaris Tram company began operations as a joint venture between Solaris and Stadler. In June, the company sold its first trams – Tramino for Braunschweig.

On 16 January 2018, the Solaris and Stadler consortium signed a framework agreement for the delivery of 50 trams for Kraków. Although the tram offered during the tender was referred to as Tramino Kraków, the operator ultimately received a tram from the Stadler Tango family.

In the second half of November 2018, Stadler acquired all shares in Solaris Tram from Solaris (this was a result of Solaris being taken over by the Spanish company CAF, which is a competitor of Stadler in the rail vehicle market). In February 2019, it was announced that the production of Tramino would be partially moved to the Stadler Polska factory in Siedlce.

== Construction ==
The Solaris Tramino family includes both multi-articulated trams (like those for Poznań) and GTx-type trams, known in Poland as short articulated trams, (such as those for Jena, Braunschweig, and Olsztyn).

The manufacturer estimates the lifespan of the trams to be 30 years.

Type	Track gauge	Number of sections	Wheel arrangement	Length	Width	Weight	Number and power of motors	Seating	Low floor	Sources
S100	1,435 mm	5	Bo'2'Bo'	31.70 m	2.35 m	41.8 t	4 × 105 kW	61+8	100%	
S105p	1,435 mm	5	Bo'2'Bo'	32.03 m	2.4 m	42.5 t	4 × 105 kW	48+5	100%	
S109j	1,000 mm	3	1A'+'Bo'+A1'	29.3 m	2.3 m	39.05 t	4 × 90 kW	61	100%	
S110b	1,100 mm	4	1A+'Bo'+1A'+A1'	35.74 m	2.3 m	50.8 t	5 × 90 kW	87	100%	
S111o	1,435 mm	3		29.3 m	2.5 m	43 t	4 × 120 kW	43	100%	
XL	1,458 mm	4		37.63 m	2.3 m		8 × 85 kW	75	65%	
Brunszwik 2	1,100 mm	4		36 m				79	100%	

=== Multi-articulated trams ===
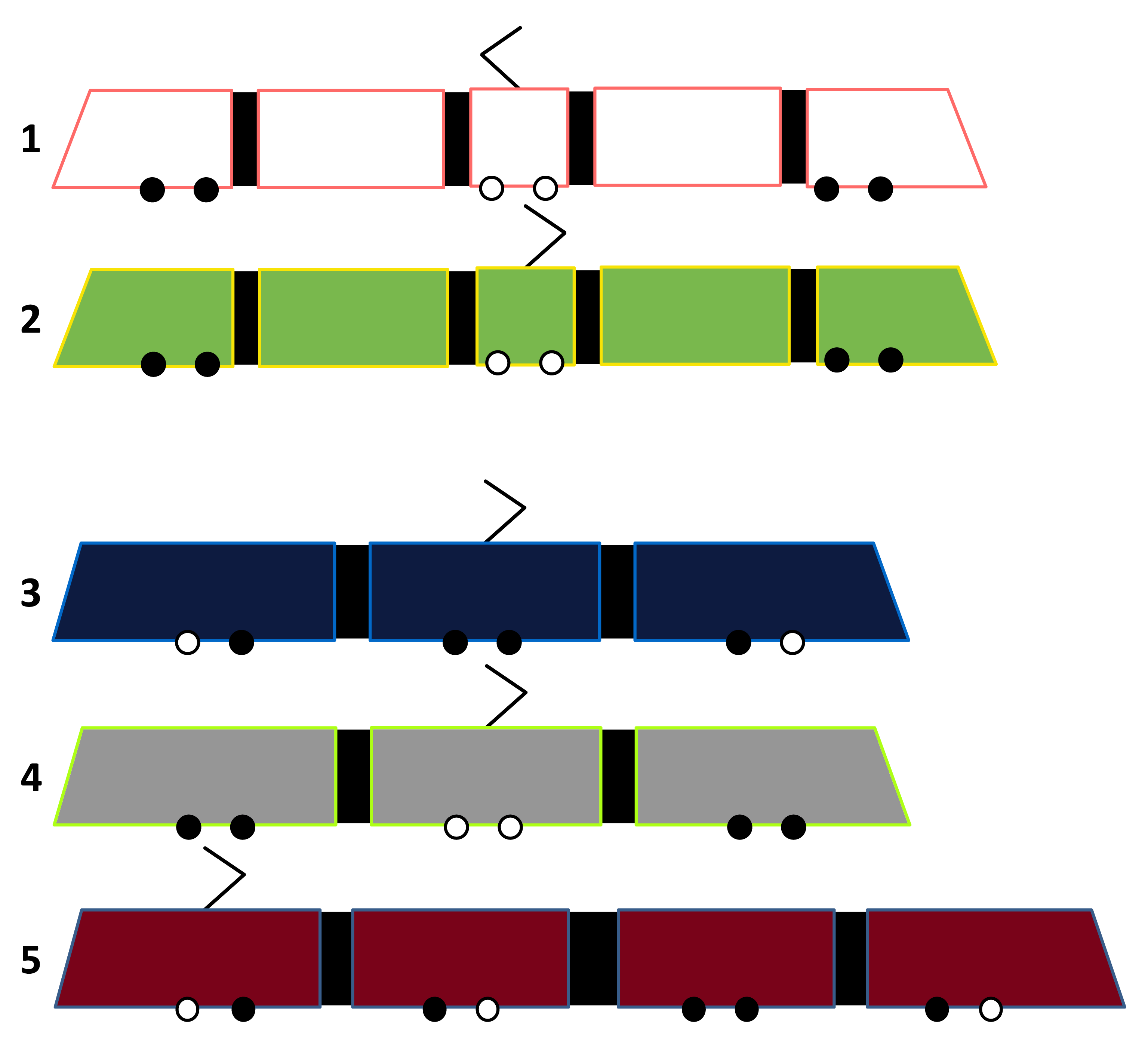
Multi-articulated trams:1 – S100, 2 – S105p,Short articulated trams: 3 – S109j, 4 – S111o, 5 – S110b

The multi-articulated S100 (prototype) and S105p (Poznań version) trams have five sections. Each odd-numbered section is supported by a two-axle bogie, while the even-numbered sections are suspended without bogies. The sections are connected by articulations, with four allowing horizontal movement and one allowing vertical movement. The first and last sections feature single-leaf doors, while the 2nd and 4th sections have two pairs of double-leaf doors. A single-arm pantograph is mounted on the middle section. The trams are 100% low-floor, with no steps; the floor height is 350 mm at the entrances and 480 mm over the bogies.

The series production S105p differs from the prototype S100 in several ways, including the absence of cutouts in the lower part of the body, allowing the narrowest passageways in the tram to be widened from 600 mm to 750 mm. The double doors are also wider – 1,500 mm instead of 1,300 mm. The number of seats has been reduced to increase overall vehicle capacity, and the pantograph's orientation has been changed (in the S100, it was oriented against the direction of travel).

=== Short articulated trams ===
GTx-type trams, unlike multi-articulated trams, have bogies under each section, resulting in more evenly distributed weight, improved stability, and reduced stress on the articulations. However, this design occupies a larger loading gauge.

The first Tramino of this type were the S109j trams purchased by Jena. The S109j are three-section, bidirectional trams operating on three bogies, with the middle one driving two axles and the outer ones driving one axle each. The bogies are non-steerable but flexible, rotating up to 4.5°. The vehicles are fully air-conditioned, feature metro-style seating, and have four doors on each side, each 1,300 mm wide. Except for the doors near the driver’s cabins, the doors are not located directly opposite each other.

The next Tramino of this type were purchased by Braunschweig. These are four-section, unidirectional trams operating on four bogies, with the second bogie driving both axles and the others driving one axle each. The vehicles are equipped with a track stabilizing system and supercapacitors.

The subsequent trams of this kind were ordered by Olsztyn. The Tramino for Olsztyn is based on the version for Jena, with the main difference being the mounting of the motors – on the bogies in the Olsztyn model, rather than in the body as in the Jena model. Additionally, the Olsztyn model has a non-standard loading gauge; it is 2.5 meters wide (trams in Poland typically have a width of 2.4 meters). These trams are equipped with an active suspension system, allowing the entry height to be adjusted, and a hydraulic track stabilization system.

=== XL variant ===
The third variant, chosen for the trams ordered by Leipzig, is partially low-floor and equipped with rotating bogies, which pivot more than a few degrees relative to the vehicle's axis. These trams have four powered bogies and one Jacobs-type trailing bogie.

== Operation ==
Country	City	Operator	Type	Operation Period	Quantity
Poland	Poznań	MPK Poznań	S100	2011–2018	1
Poland	Poznań	MPK Poznań	S105p	since 2011	45
Poland	Olsztyn	MPK Olsztyn	S111o	since 2015	15
Germany	Jena	Jenaer Nahverkehr	S109j	since 2013	5
Germany	Braunschweig	Braunschweiger Verkehrs	S110b	since 2014	25
Germany	Leipzig	Leipziger Verkehrsbetriebe	XL	since 2017	61
Total:					152

=== Poznań ===
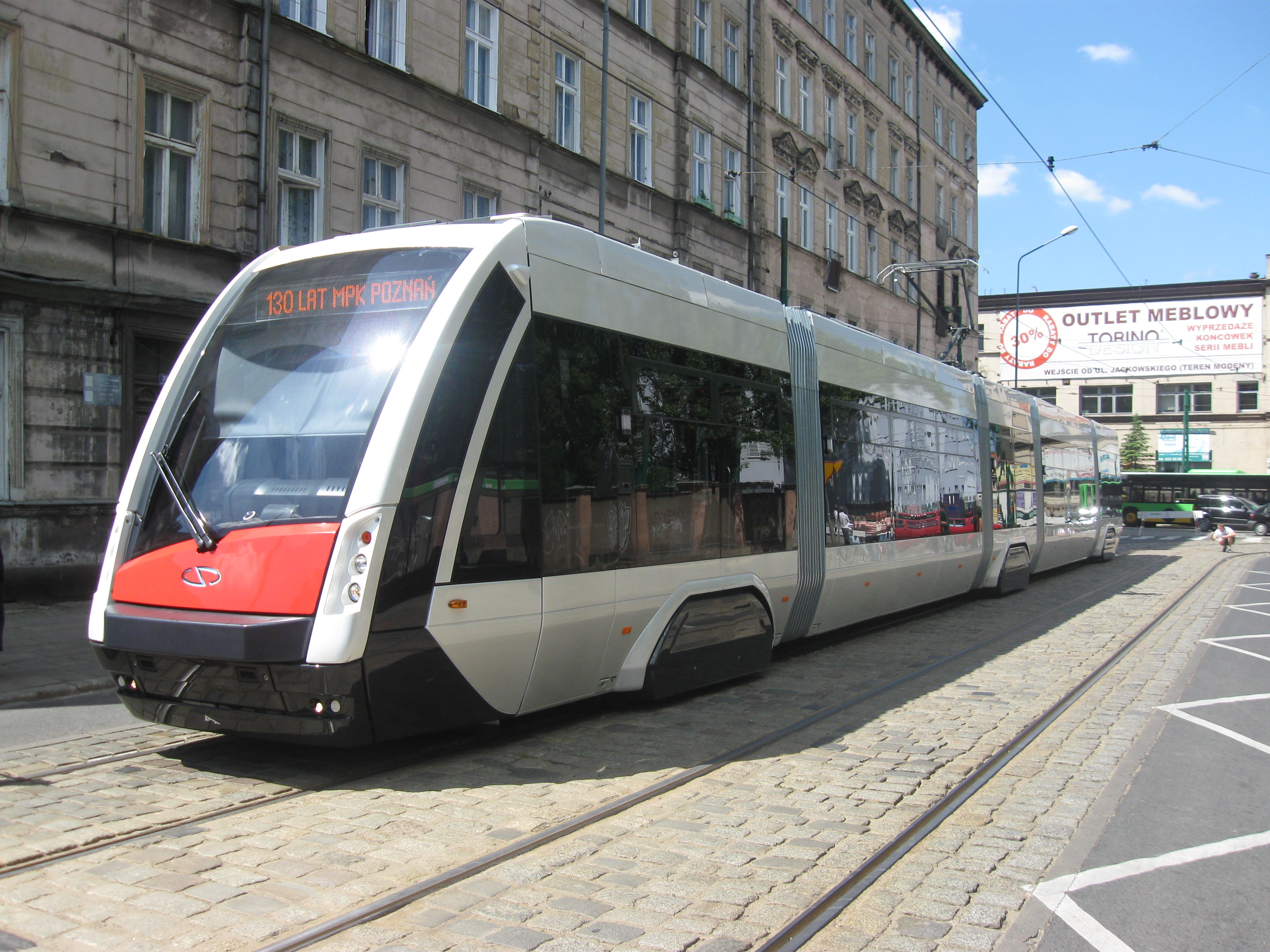
Prototype S100 in Poznań

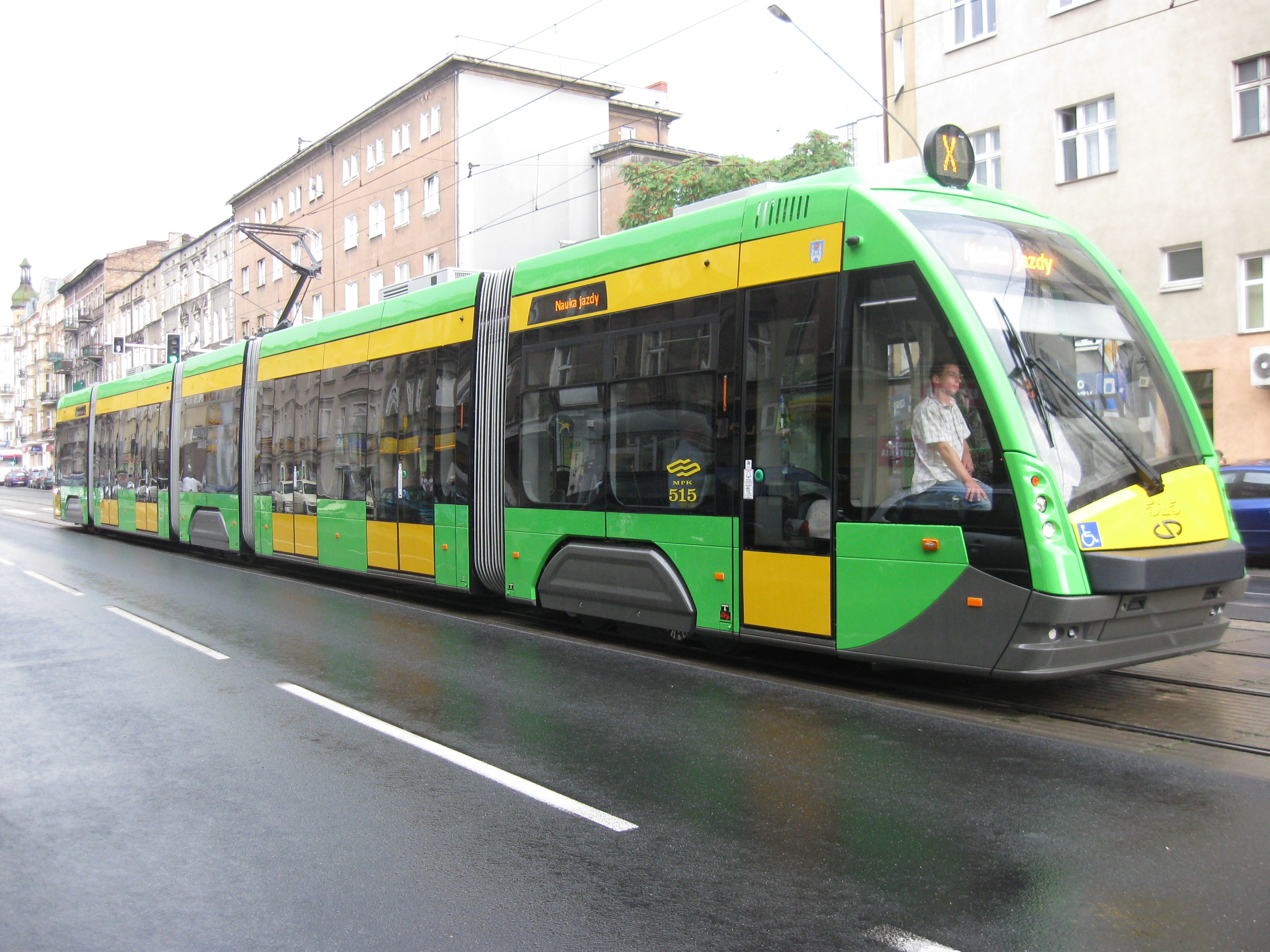
S105p in Poznań

On 23 November 2009, Solaris signed a contract with the Municipal Transport Company in Poznań for the delivery of 40 low-floor trams, with an option to extend the order by an additional 20 units. On 28 December 2010, the company signed an agreement with Solaris for 5 additional units. To fulfill the order, Solaris leased a hall in the Junikowo district of Poznań for the final assembly of the Tramino trams.

Two days before signing the first contract, a prototype Tramino with similar specifications to those ordered by the Municipal Transport Company arrived in Poznań. In March 2010, the prototype began testing on the streets of Poznań, and by mid-May, it received authorization for street operation. At the end of May, it was showcased at the Tramway Commission of the Polish Chamber of Urban Transport. On November 26, the Tramino made its first passenger run, and on January 28, it began regular service on Line 14. The Municipal Transport Company eventually decided to lease the prototype Tramino from Solaris. In 2015, the prototype was tested in Kraków for several months before returning to Poznań, where it was tested until August 2018.

The first series production Tramino was delivered on 23 April 2011 to the depot on Głogowska Street. On May 23, it was presented and received homologation. The first tram entered service on August 11, followed by the second on August 26. By the end of 2011, 26 units had been delivered, with the deliveries completed on 28 May 2012.

On 11 December 2014, a Tramino driven by an intoxicated workshop employee collided with another tram during a technical run, injuring 20 people. The damage to the tram was so severe that it required a new front section frame.

In August 2018, the operation of the prototype unit (S100) was discontinued due to a failure, and the vehicle returned to the manufacturer. In February 2022, Solaris' spokesperson announced plans to scrap the prototype due to the lack of buyers or lessees and the cost of restoring the tram exceeding its value.

In August 2021, tram number 547 was involved in an accident when it was rear-ended by a Moderus Gamma tram, number 610. The incident injured 31 people. In June 2022 and January 2023, two more trams were involved in accidents, colliding with a viaduct at Górczyn; fortunately, there were no injuries in either case.

In April 2022, the Municipal Transport Company purchased the prototype Tramino, which was transported to the Franowo depot. In October 2023, a contract was signed with the consortium of Serwis Pojazdów Szynowych and Falkone for the major repair and modernization of the tram to match the series-produced Tramino S105p units.

=== Olsztyn ===
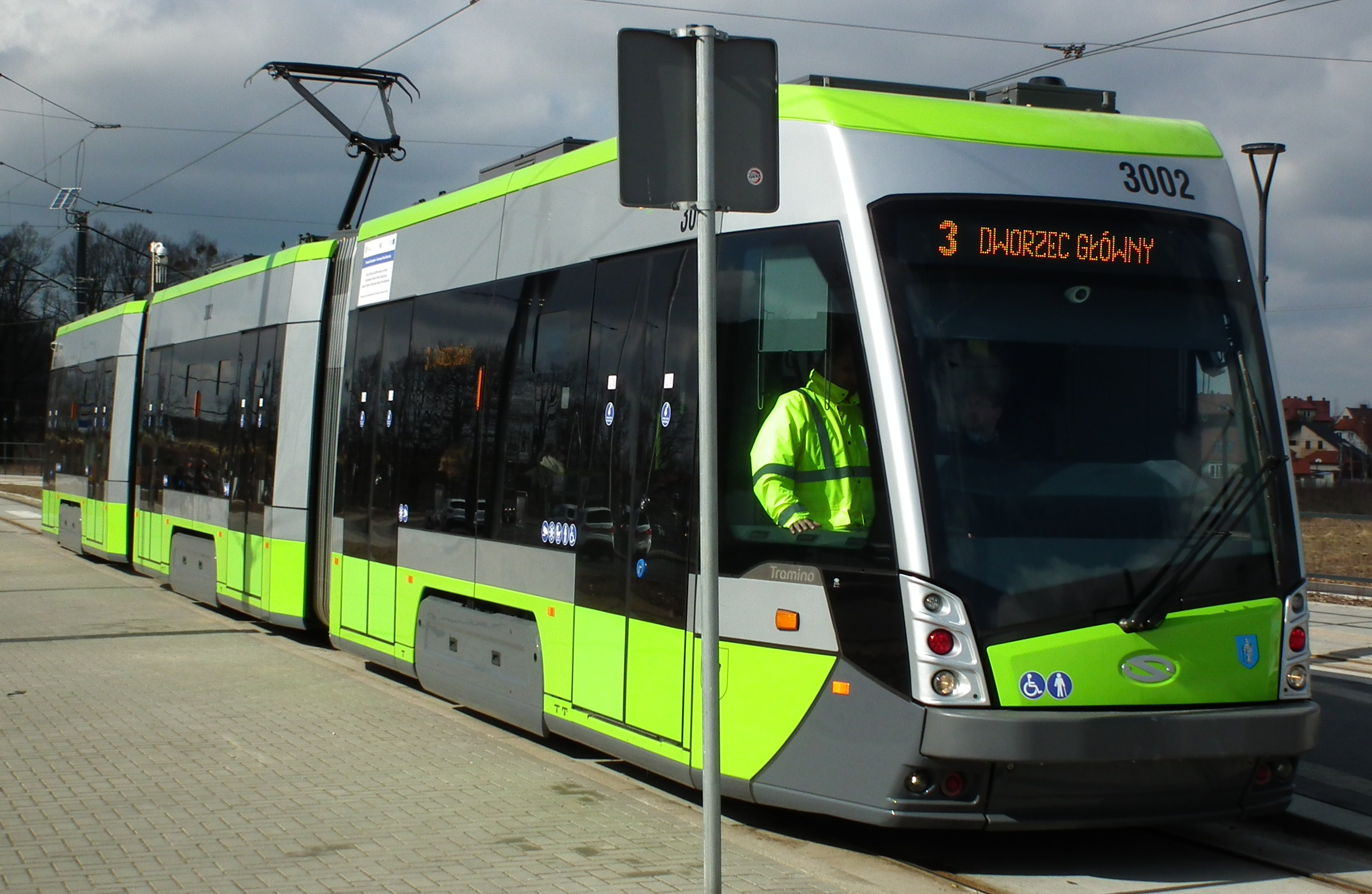
S111o in Olsztyn

On 21 September 2012, a contract was signed with the city of Olsztyn for the delivery of 15 bidirectional, three-section trams. All vehicles were originally scheduled to be delivered in 2014, coinciding with the completion of a new tram line in Olsztyn, where trams had been discontinued in the 1960s. However, due to delays in the tram line construction, deliveries were postponed to 2015.

By the end of May 2015, the first tram was ready and subsequently sent for testing at the Franowo depot in Poznań, which lasted until the second half of July. The second produced unit, numbered 3001, was delivered to Olsztyn on June 12 and showcased at the tram depot on June 19. The third tram, numbered 3002, was delivered on June 25, with the remaining trams planned for delivery by early October. The first trial run of one of the trams took place at the Olsztyn depot on August 21, and the deliveries were completed on October 5. From September 22 to 25, Olsztyn's Tramino No. 3011 was exhibited at the Trako trade fair in Gdańsk.

On November 19, one of the trams undertook a trial run on the route from the depot to the railway station. A week later, the first phase of testing was completed, during which the tram traveled nearly 11 km and reached a speed of 70 km/h. Testing revealed the need for minor adjustments to 7 of the 40 tram platforms. On December 3, driver training commenced, with 2 trams adapted for training purposes. On December 6, during the tram depot's open day, the first passenger runs took place. The first tram line was launched on December 19 in Olsztyn, followed by the second on December 27.

By late September 2018, 5 of the 15 trams were withdrawn from service due to suspected issues with the portal axle bearings. Ultimately, 7 trams were sent for repairs. By February 2019, 13 trams were operational, with the remaining 2 undergoing repairs.

=== Jena ===
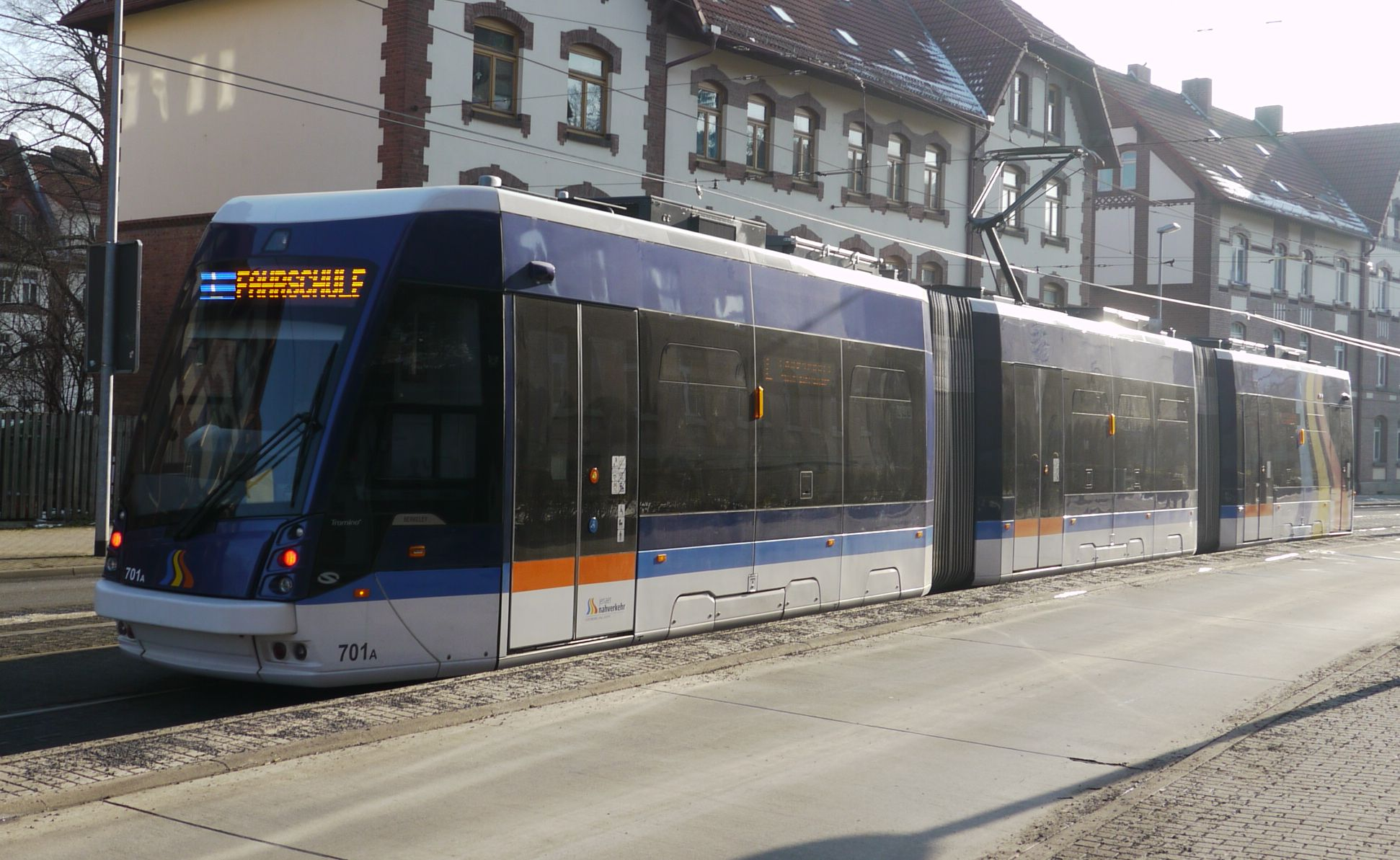
S109j in Jena

On 11 July 2011, a contract was signed with Jenaer Nahverkehr GmbH for the delivery of 5 bidirectional, three-section trams. The first tram was delivered in the second half of July 2013 and showcased on September 3. By the second half of September, all 5 trams had been received, with the official presentation taking place on November 9 in Jena.

All 5 trams were named after Jena's sister cities: Aubervilliers, Berkeley, Erlangen, Lugoj, and San Marcos. The Tramino units in Jena were the first Polish-produced trams sold in Germany.

=== Braunschweig ===
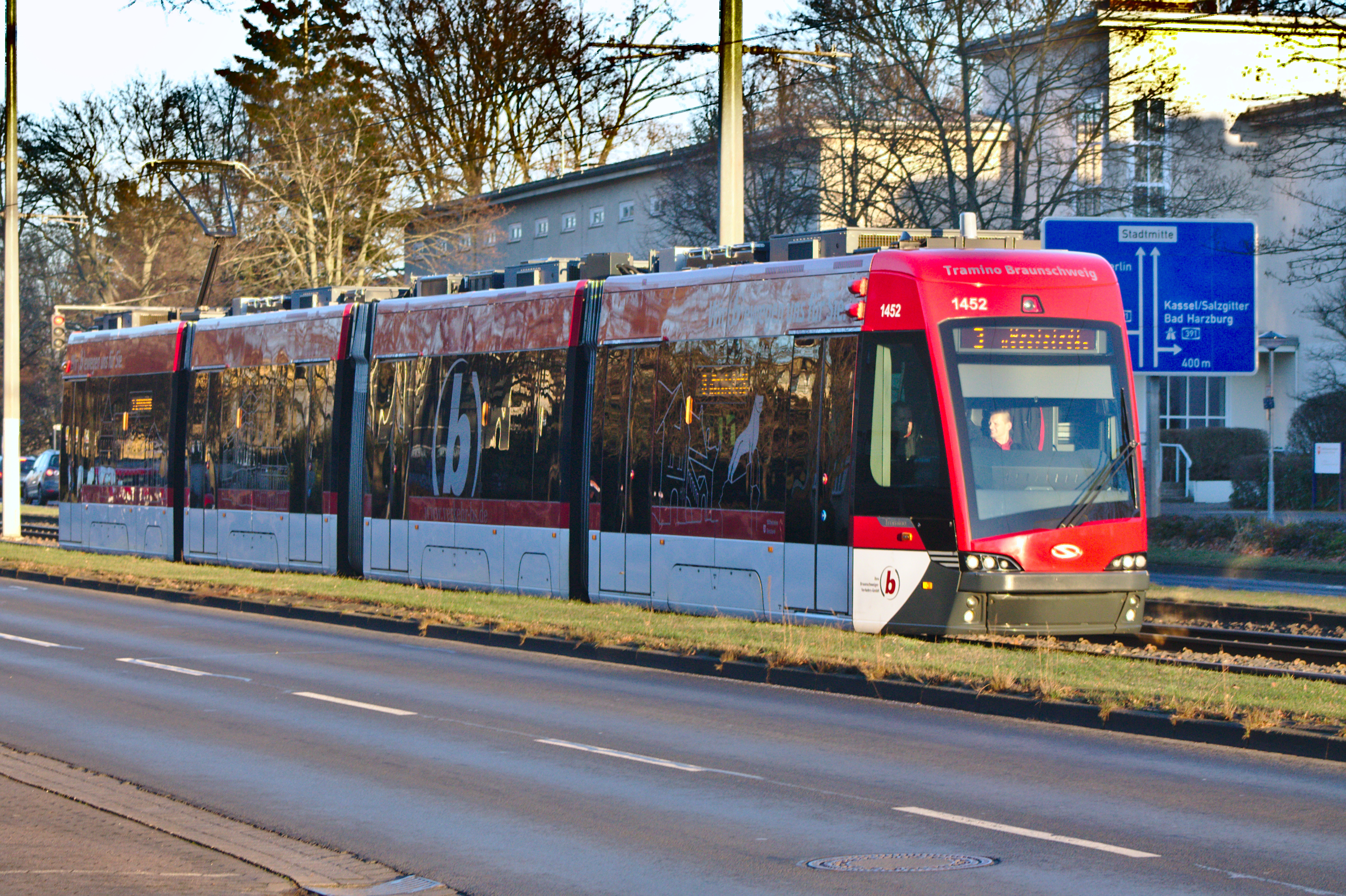
S110b in Braunschweig

On 5 July 2012, a contract was signed with Braunschweiger Verkehrs AG for the delivery of 15 trams to Braunschweig, Germany, scheduled for delivery between May and December 2014. On 21 May 2013, an option to extend the order by 3 additional units was exercised, with delivery scheduled by May 2015. Production of the trams began in December 2013, with the sections of the first unit assembled by March 2014 and the interior fitted. The first tram was delivered to Braunschweig on 18 July 2014, followed by the second in early August. On September 28, three of the trams were showcased during the Days of Technology and Innovation, and regular service for two of the trams began on 13 April 2015. All tram deliveries were completed in 2015.

On 29 June 2017, the operator ordered 7 additional trams (with an option for 7 more) that differed slightly from the earlier models. The first tram from this batch was delivered on 22 August 2019, and began operation in May 2020. The delivery of all 7 trams was completed by September 2020.

=== Leipzig ===
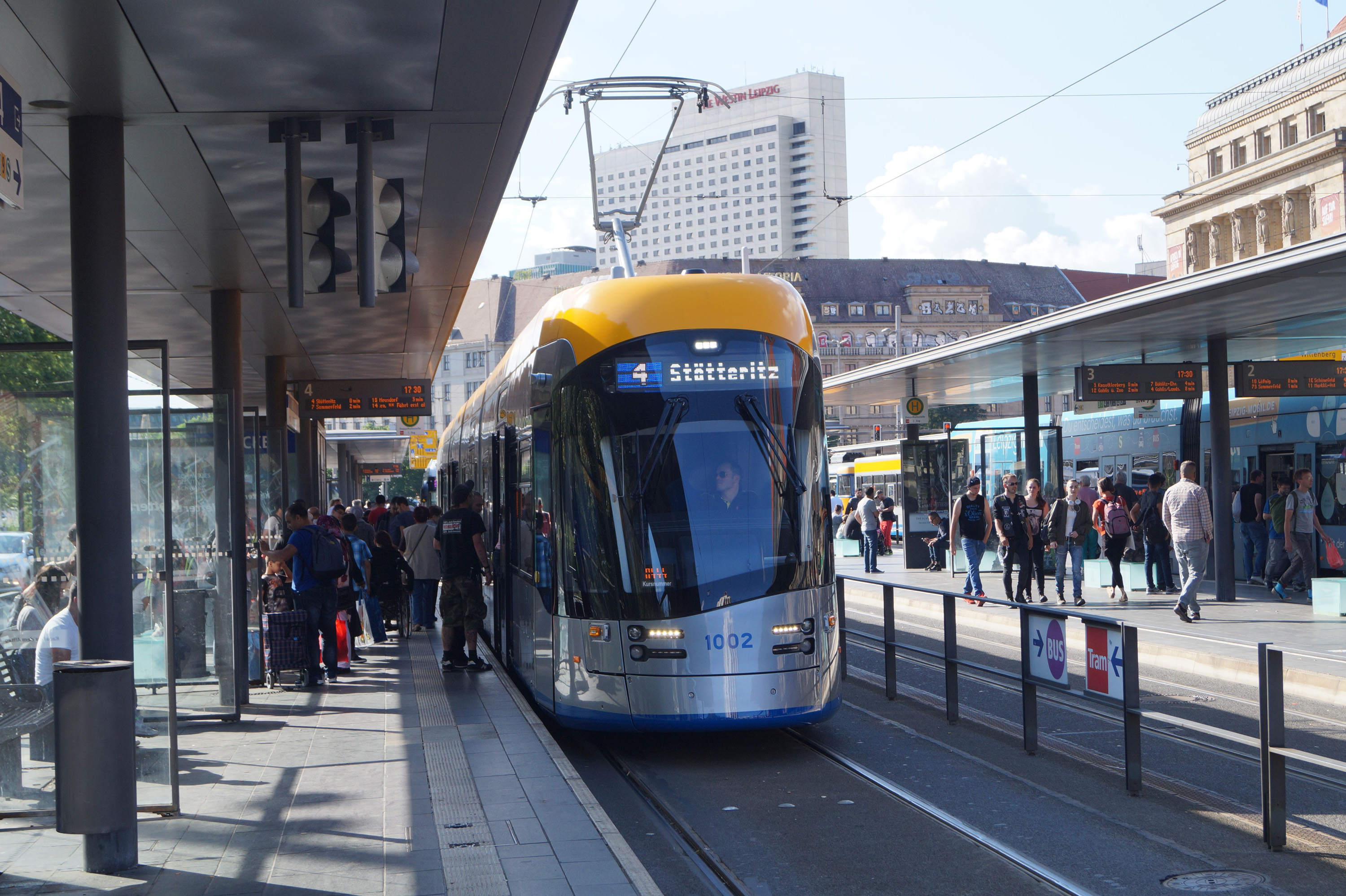
XL in Leipzig

On 26 March 2015, a framework agreement was signed with Leipziger Verkehrsbetriebe for the delivery of 41 trams to Leipzig. The delivery was planned in four batches, with Solaris set to deliver 5 trams in the first batch. In the first quarter of 2016, a contract was signed for the second batch consisting of 9 trams. The first tram arrived in Leipzig on December 21 and was nicknamed XL due to its size. On February 11, one of the trams was showcased at the Haus-Garten-Freizeit fair. The first passenger run occurred on July 13, followed by the first scheduled service on line 4 on July 14. On 22 September 2017, a contract was signed for the third batch of 9 trams. By then, 5 out of the 23 trams ordered had been delivered. By the end of 2017, 7 trams were in service. On 20 December 2018, the framework order was expanded from 41 to 61 trams, and by the end of 2018, 17 trams had been delivered. The final (61st) tram from the order was delivered in late June 2022.

== Awards and honors ==
- 2011 – Ernest Malinowski Award at Trako Fair in Gdańsk.
- 2011 – Jan Podoski Award (Polish Chamber of Urban Transport).
- 2011 – distinction in the Automotive and Public Transport category at the arena DESIGN fair in Poznań.
- 2013 – Jan Podoski Award at Trako Fair in Gdańsk.
- 2013 – medal from the President of the Association of Polish Electrical Engineers at Trako Fair in Gdańsk.
- 2015 – Red Dot Award for the design of Tramino for Braunschweig.
- 2017 – Ernest Malinowski Award at Trako Fair in Gdańsk for Tramino Leipzig.
