= Alstom APS =

Alternative method of third rail electrical pick-up for street trams

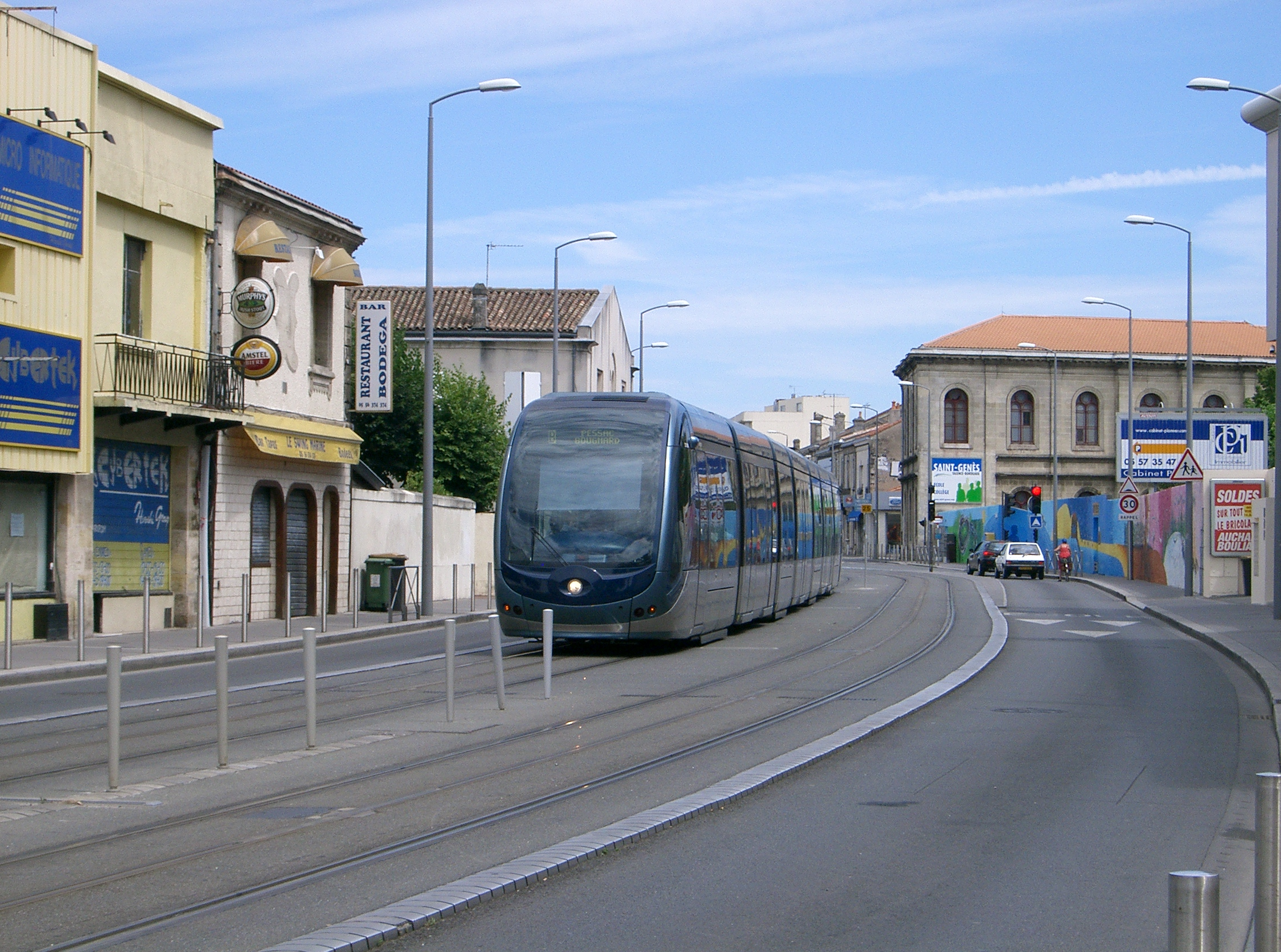
Bordeaux tram using APS on route B near the Roustaing tram stop

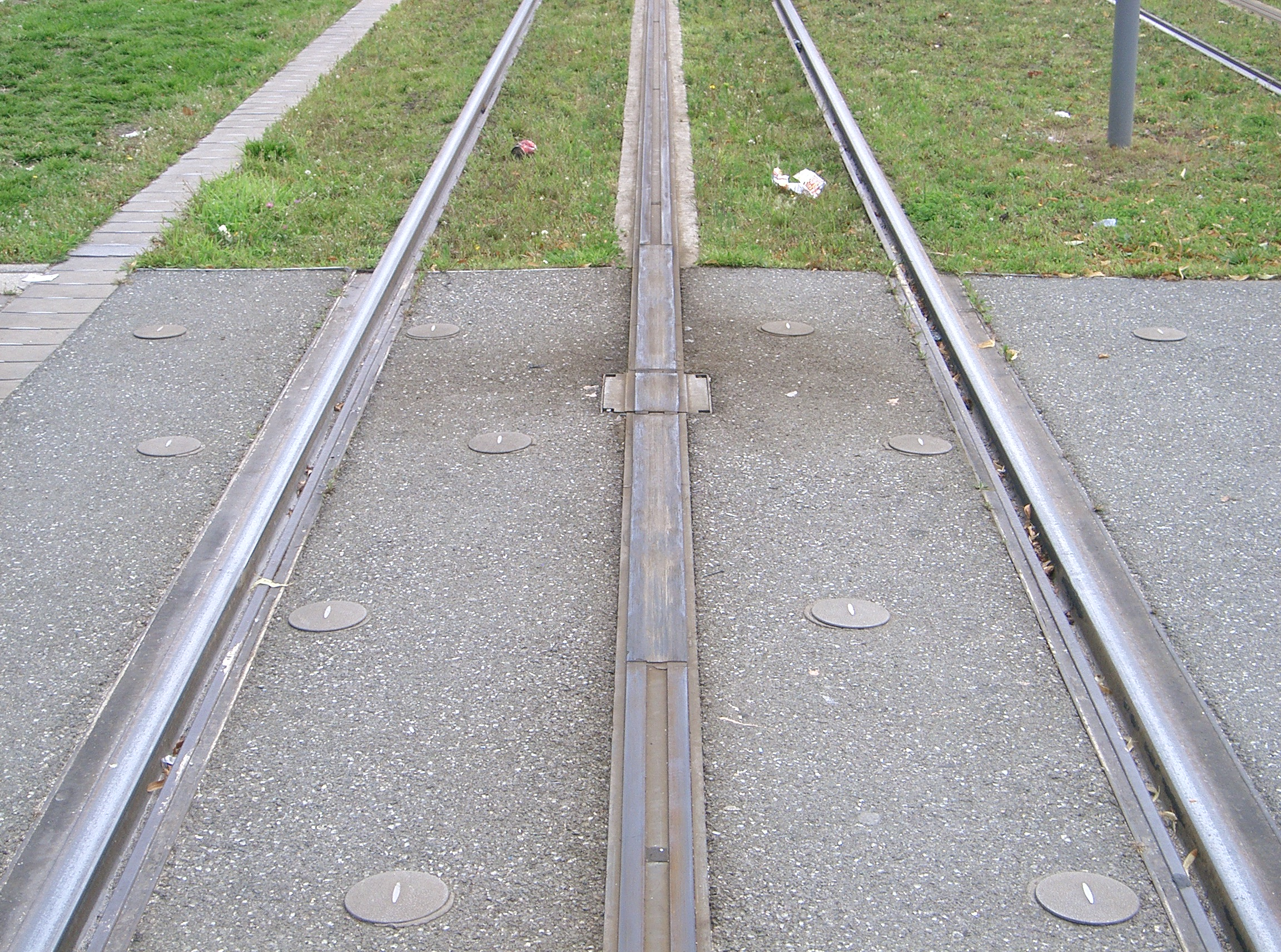
A section of APS track showing the neutral sections at the end of the powered segments plus one of the insulating joint boxes, which mechanically and electrically join the APS rail segments

Alstom APS (originally known as Alimentation par Sol or Alimentation Par le Sol (which literally means "feeding via the ground"), and later rebranded as Aesthetic Power Supply) is a form of ground-level power supply for street trams and, potentially, other vehicles. APS was developed by Innorail, a subsidiary of Spie Enertrans, but was sold to Alstom when Spie was acquired by Amec. It was originally created for the Bordeaux tramway, which began construction in 2000 and opened in 2003. From 2011, the technology has been used in a number of other cities around the world.

APS is used, primarily for aesthetic reasons, as an alternative to overhead lines. As such, it competes with other ground-level power supply systems but also with energy storage systems such as batteries. In 2015, Alstom developed a derivative of APS, Alstom SRS (Système de Recharge statique par le sol or static-based ground charging system), which can be used to recharge battery powered trams and buses while they are stationary at stops.

Alstom further developed the APS system for use with buses and other vehicles. The system has been tested for safety when the road is cleared by snowplows, under exposure to snow, ice, salting, and saturated brine, and for skid and road adherence safety for vehicles, including motorcycles. Alstom will trial its electric road system (ERS) on the public road RN205 in the Rhône-Alpes region between 2024 and 2027. The system is expected to supply 500 kW of power for electric heavy trucks, as well as power for road utility vehicles and electric cars.

== Technology ==
APS uses a third rail placed between the running rails that is divided electrically into 11 m segments that automatically switch on and off according to whether a tram is passing over them, which the manufacturer states eliminates risk to other road users. Each tram has two power collection shoes, next to which are antennas that send radio signals to energise the power rail segments as the tram passes over them. At any time, two consecutive segments under the tram will be live.

APS is different from the conduit current collection system, which was one of the first ways of supplying power to a tram system, as the latter involves burying a third and fourth rail in an underground conduit or trench between the running rails. Conduit current collection was used in historic tram systems in Washington, Manhattan, Paris, Berlin, Marseilles, Vienna, Budapest and London. It fell into disuse because overhead wires proved much less expensive and troublesome for street railways.

APS systems boast high standards of safety and efficiency, and are minimally invasive aesthetically, which makes them especially suitable for urban settings. Overall infrastructure costs relative to catenary installation remain higher and APS systems can experience problems when operating in extremely wet and rainy conditions.

=== Safety ===
Unlike the track-side third rail that is used by most metro trains and some main-line railways, APS poses no danger to people or animals and so can be used in pedestrian areas and city streets. The French government reports no electrocutions or electrification accidents on any tramway in France from as early as 2003 until as recently as December 31, 2022.

== Uses ==
=== Bordeaux ===
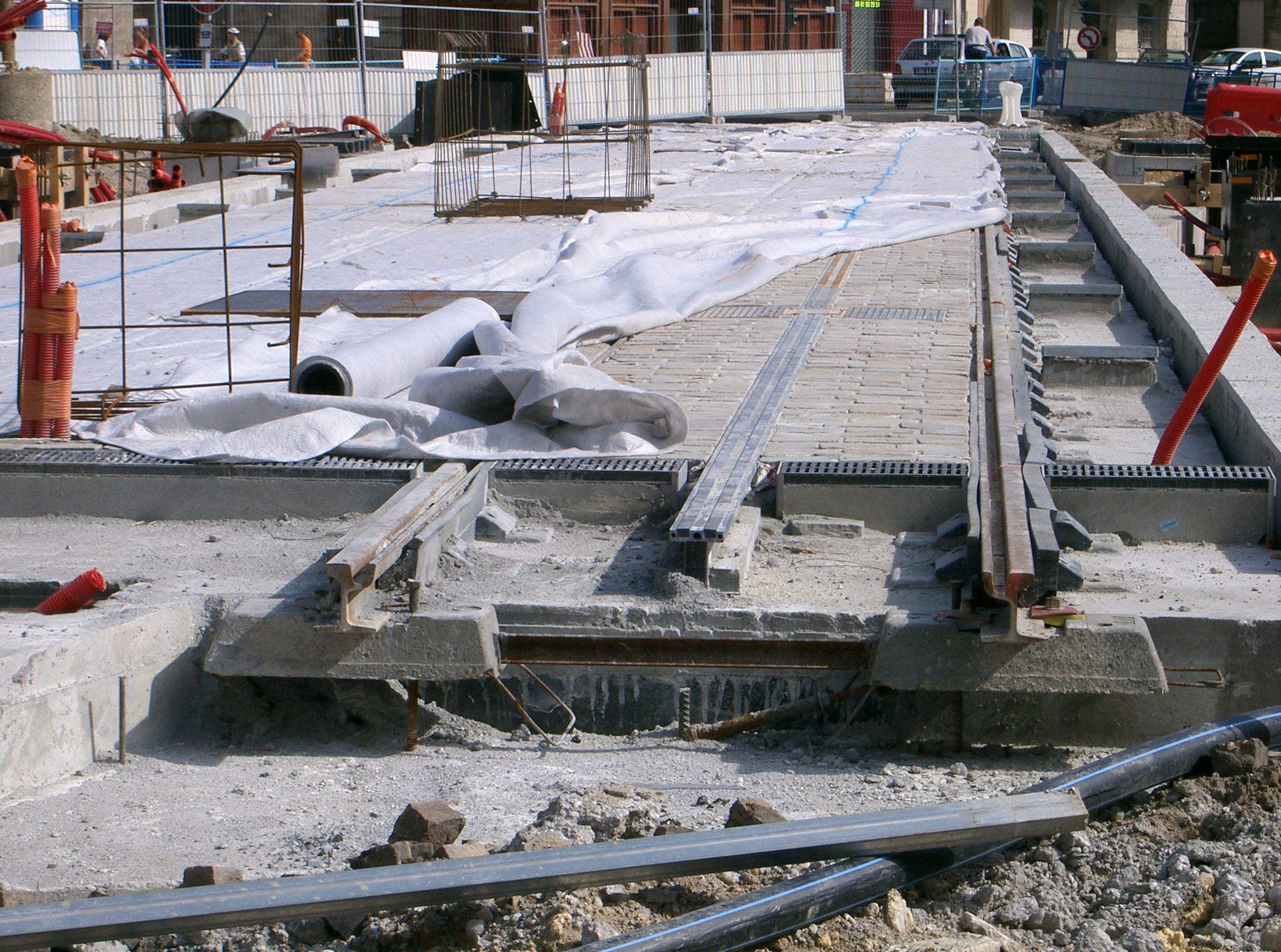
Track with APS under construction in Place Paul Doumer, Bordeaux

Conduit current collection systems were used in the late 1800s and early 1900s in several major cities, among them Bordeaux, but they posed maintenance issues and road safety issues. The Bordeaux conduit systems remained among the last in operation until being decommissioned in 1958. For decades, conduit systems were not reintroduced because they didn't meet modern safety standards. The first ground-level power supply system developed to modern safety standards was the Ansaldo Stream, although Alstom APS was the first to be commercially implemented in 2003. This success led to a proliferation of commercial implementations of ground-level power supply systems.

Construction of the new, catenary-free tramway started in February 2000. In May 2000 a contract was signed with Alstom for the supply of the tram fleet, and in October the first track was laid. Construction and testing continued through 2001 to 2003, and the first section of the tramway opened on 21 December 2003 in the presence of President Jacques Chirac, and the mayor of Bordeaux, Alain Juppé. The newly open section, known as line A, ran from Lormont-Lauriers and La Morlette, to Mériadeck.

=== Other cities ===
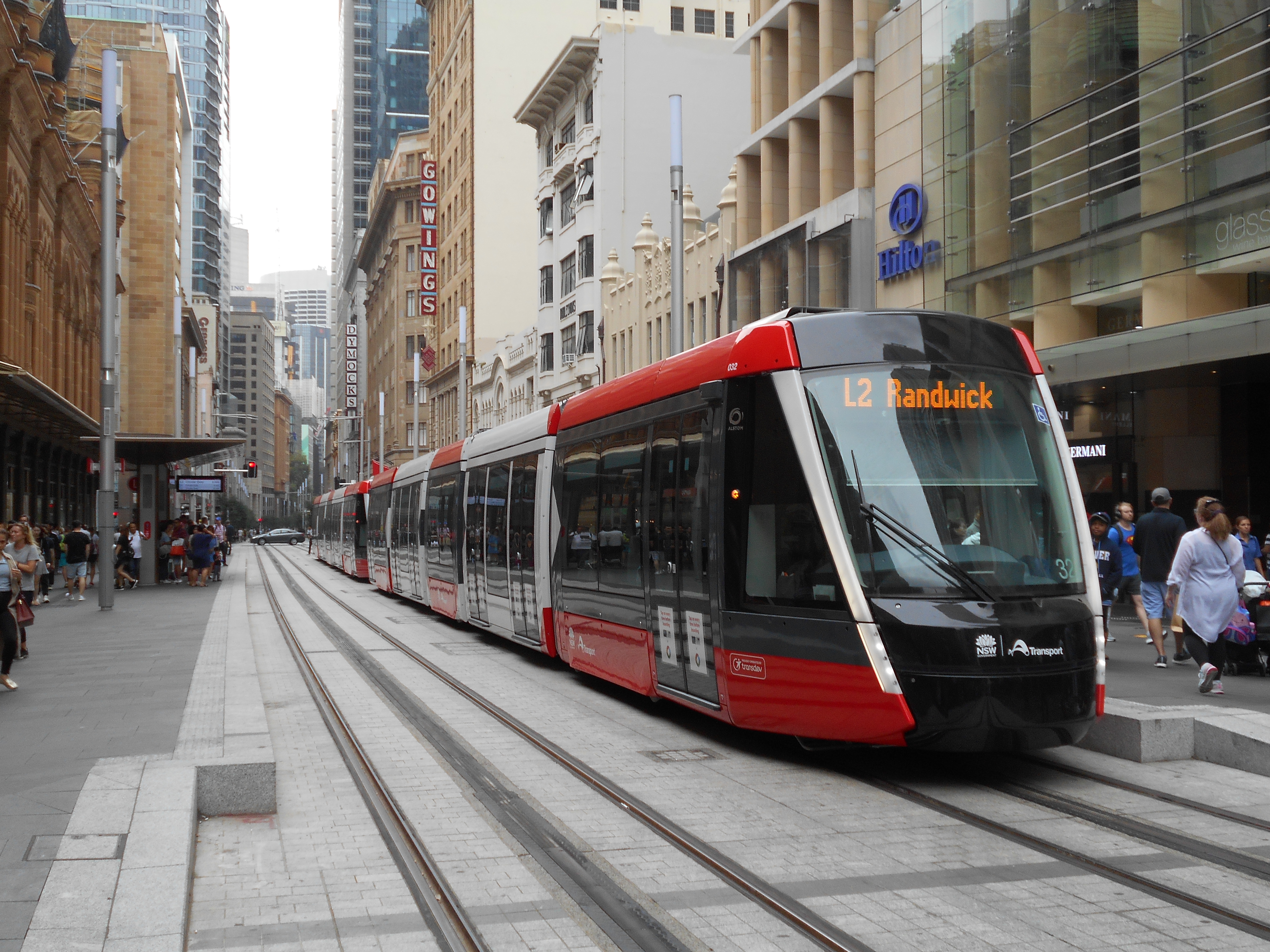
Alstom APS tracks on the CBD and South East Light Rail in Sydney

System	City	Country	Opened	Comments
Angers tramway	Angers	France	2011	
Reims tramway	Reims	France	2011	
Orléans tramway	Orléans	France	2012	
Tours tramway	Tours	France	2013	
Dubai Tram	Dubai	United Arab Emirates	2014	The system is fully equipped with APS over its entire passenger route length and thus trams do not use their pantographs unless they are travelling within the depot area.
VLT Carioca	Rio de Janeiro	Brazil	2016	The system mainly uses APS, but where that was deemed impractical, the trams employ Alstom's proprietary supercapacitor-based energy storage system.
CBD and South East Light Rail	Sydney	Australia	2019	The system uses APS within the Sydney CBD and conventional overhead wires elsewhere.
Cuenca tram	Cuenca	Ecuador	2020	The system uses APS in certain regions only and conventional overhead wires elsewhere.
Istanbul T5 tramway	Istanbul	Turkey	2021	
Lusail Tram	Lusail	Qatar	2022	The system uses APS on the above ground sections, with around 19 km of APS.
Barcelona tram	Barcelona	Spain	2024	The system uses APS in certain parts of the Trambesòs only and conventional overhead wires elsewhere.

== Standardization ==
Alstom, Elonroad, and other companies in 2020 began drafting a standard for ground-level power supply electric roads. A working group of the French Ministry of Ecology considers rail ground-level power supply technology to be the most likely candidate for electric roads. The first standard for electrical equipment on board a vehicle powered by a rail electric road system (ERS), CENELEC Technical Standard 50717, has been approved in late 2022. The following standards, encompassing "full interoperability" and a "unified and interoperable solution" for ground-level power supply, are scheduled to be published by the end 2024, detailing complete "specifications for communication and power supply through conductive rails embedded in the road".
