= Quinconces tram stop =

Tram stop in Bordeaux, France

Quinconces
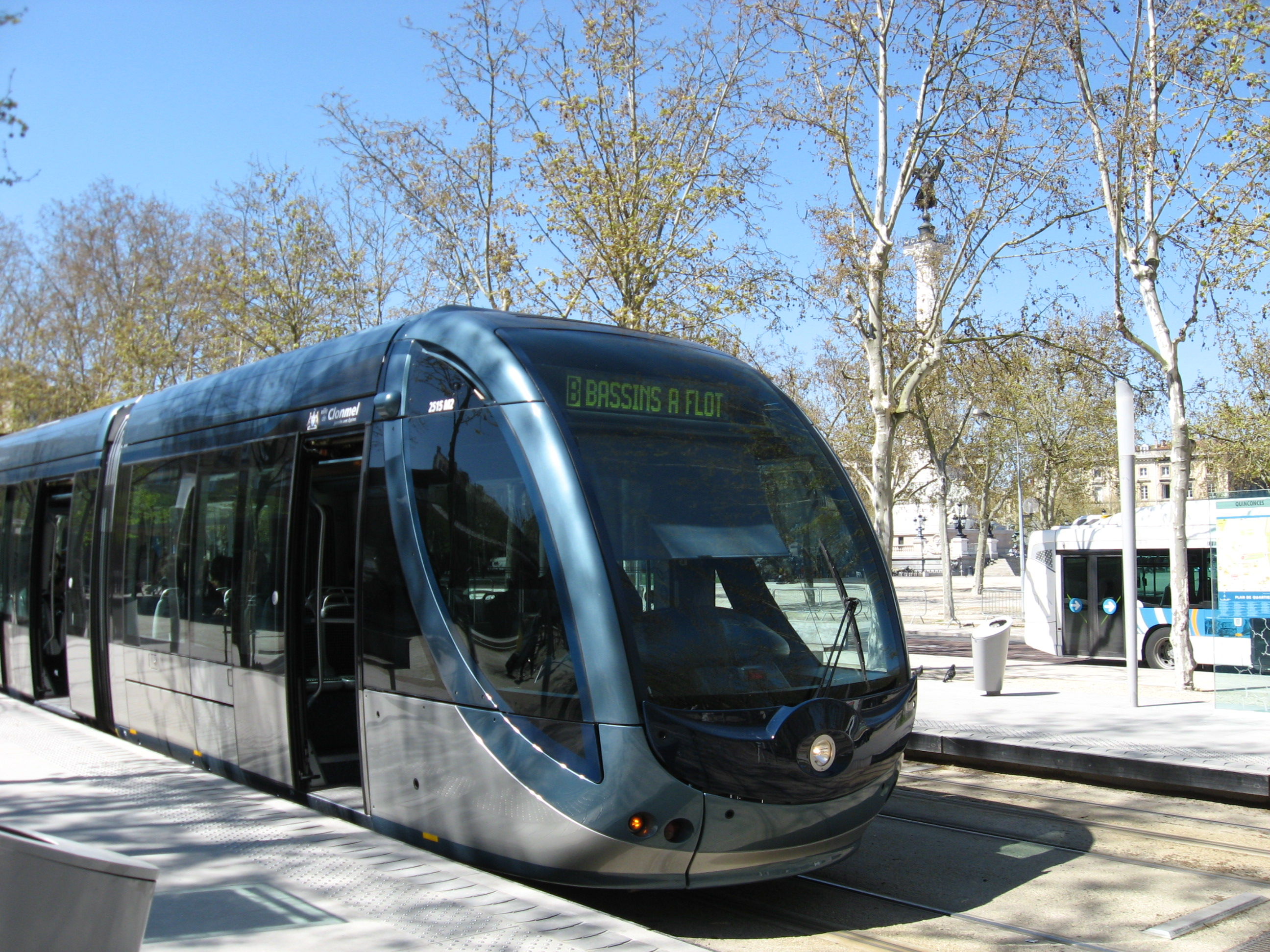
- A Bassins à Flot-bound tram at the stop in 2009

General information
- Location: Bordeaux; France
- Coordinates: 44°50′40″N 0°34′26″W
- Lines: Line B; Line C; Line D

Construction
- Architect: Elizabeth de Portzamparc

History
- Opened: 24 April 2004

Services
Preceding station	Bordeaux tramway	Following station
Grand Théâtre towards France Alouette or Pessac Centre	Line B	CAPC towards Berges de la Garonne
Jardin Public towards Gare de Blanquefort or Parc des Expositions - Stade Matmut-Atlantique	Line C	Place de la Bourse towards Villenave Pyrénées
Fondaudège - Muséum towards Cantinolle	Line D	Place de la Bourse towards Carle Vernet
Location
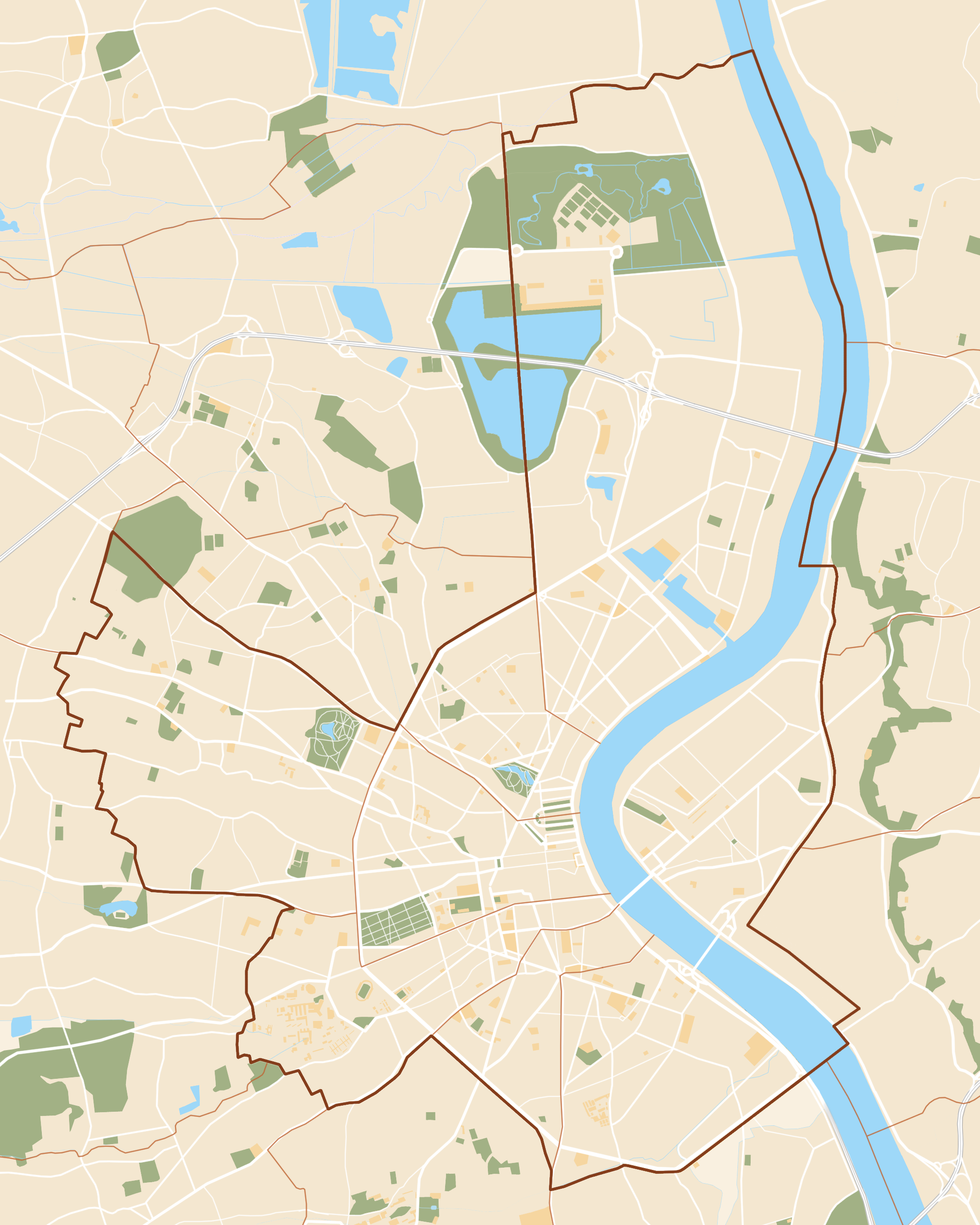
- Location within Bordeaux Location within Nouvelle-Aquitaine Location within France

Quinconces tram stop is located on lines B, C and D of the Tramway de Bordeaux, and serves as an interchange between the three lines. The stop is located in the Place des Quinconces in the centre of the city of Bordeaux, and has four parallel platforms. Two of these serve lines C and D, which share tracks at this point, whilst the other two serve line B. The stop is operated by Transports Bordeaux Métropole.

The stop opened on 24 April 2004, when both lines B and C opened. It initially served as the terminus of both lines, until 27 July 2007, when line B was extended to Bassins à Flot, and 19 November 2007, when line C was extended to Grand-Parc. Line D first served the stop on 14 December 2019, when that line opened.

For most of the day on Mondays to Fridays, trams run at least every five minutes in both directions on both lines B and C, and every eight minutes on line D. Services run less frequently in the early morning, late evenings, weekends and public holidays.

== Interchanges ==
=== TBM bus network ===
This place serves as a terminus for many bus lines, enabling their connections with the tramway.

N.	Course	Link	Exploitant
2	Bordeaux-Quinconces <=> Le Taillan-La Boétie	2	TBM
3	Bordeaux-Quinconces <=> Saint-Médard-Issac, -Gare routière or Saint-Aubin-Villepreux	3	TBM
26	Bordeaux-Quinconces <=> Bègles-Terres Neuves	26	TBM
58	Gradignan-Village 5 <=> Bordeaux-Base sous marine	58	TBM

=== TransGironde network ===
N.	Course	Link
601	Gare Saint-Jean ou Quinconces <=> Saint-Jean-d'Illac-Le Las ou Lège-Cap-Ferret -Salle des Sports ou -La Pointe	Schedule
703	Quinconces<=> Lesparre-Médoc-Gare SNCF	Schedule

== Close by ==
- Allées de Tourny
- Parking Tourny
