= Pessac station =

Railway station in Pessac, France

Pessac Peçac
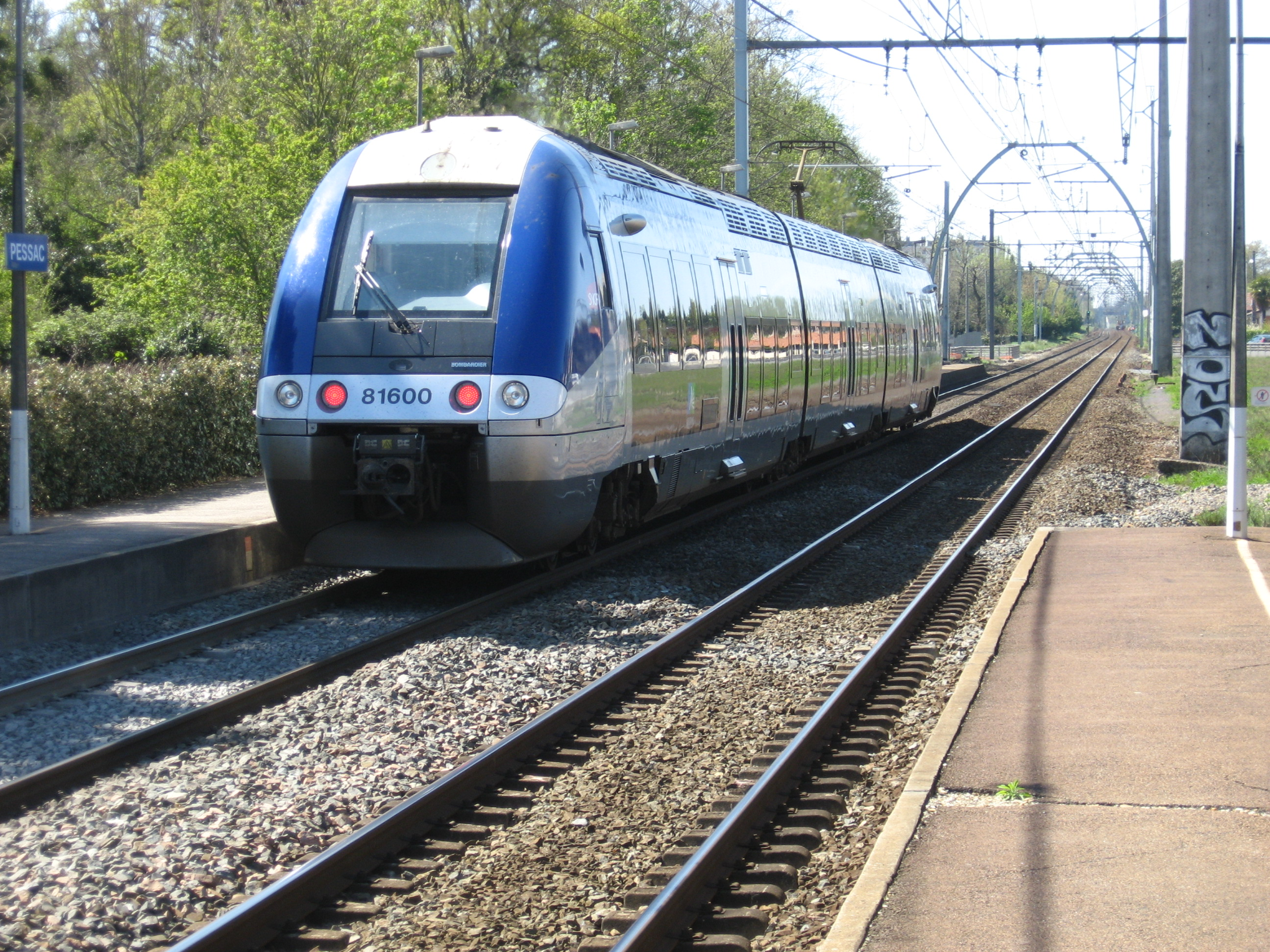
- Train near platform at Pessac Station

General information
- Location: 6 rue Eugêne et Marc Dulout 33610 Pessac, France
- Coordinates: 44°48′15.9″N 0°37′54.29″W
- Owner: RFF / SNCF
- Line: TER Aquitaine
- Platforms: 2
- Tracks: 2
- Connections: Tramway line (Pessac Centre); Bus lines 4, 23, 24, 35, 36, 42, 44, 48, 54, 87

Other information
- Station code: 87581751

Passengers
- 2024: 1,206,056
Services
Preceding station	TER Nouvelle-Aquitaine	Following station
Bordeaux Terminus	41.2U	Pessac-Alouette towards Arcachon
Terminus	42	Mérignac-Arlac towards Macau
Bordeaux Terminus	45	Biganos-Facture towards Mont-de-Marsan
Bordeaux Terminus	51	Biganos-Facture towards Hendaye
Bordeaux Terminus	52	Biganos-Facture towards Tarbes
Location

Pessac is a railway station in Pessac, a western suburb of Bordeaux, Nouvelle-Aquitaine, France. The station is located on the Bordeaux–Irun railway line. The station is served by TER (local) services operated by SNCF. The Pessac Centre tram stop of the Bordeaux tramway is adjacent to the railway station, with direct access between station and tram stop platforms.

== Train services ==
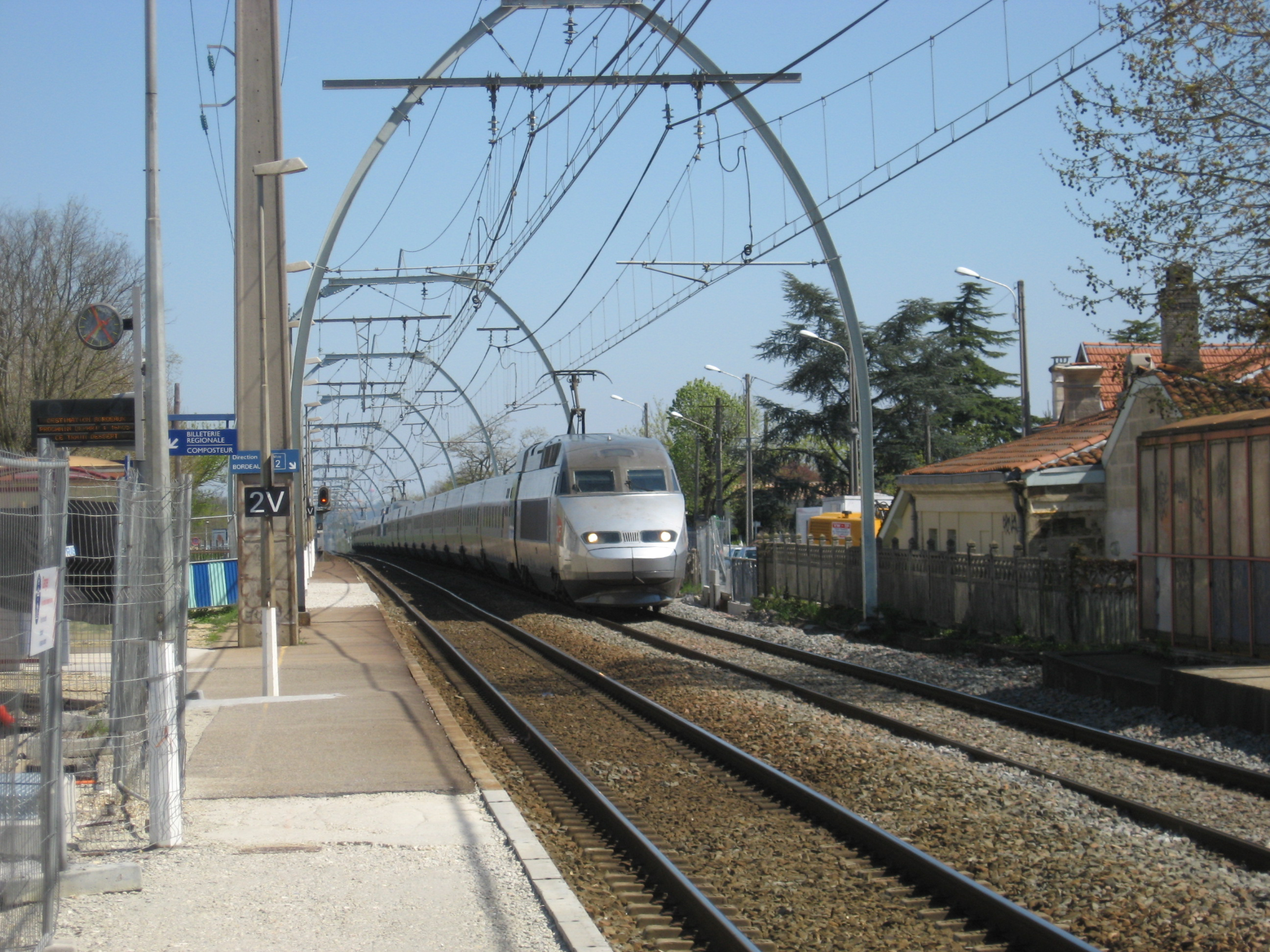
A TGV speeds through Pessac

The following services currently call at Pessac:

- local service (TER Nouvelle-Aquitaine) Bordeaux - Arcachon
- local service (TER Nouvelle-Aquitaine) Pessac - Macau
- local service (TER Nouvelle-Aquitaine) Bordeaux - Morcenx - Mont-de-Marsan
- local service (TER Nouvelle-Aquitaine) Bordeaux - Dax - Bayonne - Hendaye
- local service (TER Nouvelle-Aquitaine) Bordeaux - Dax - Pau - Tarbes

== Connections ==
- Bordeaux tramway : Line : Bassins à Flots - Bordeaux / Pessac Centre station.
- Bus lines of the TBM:

Liane	4		Bordeaux-St Louis <=> Pessac-Magonty
Ligne	23		Fontaine d'Arlac <=> Pessac-Romainville ou Toctoucau
Ligne	24		Porte de Bourgogne <=> Pessac–Bougnard
Corol	35		Peixotto <=> Les Aubiers
Corol	36		Gare de Pessac <=> Bègles Terres Neuves
Citéis	42		Mérignac-Lycée Daguin (operation buckles some around Mérignac)
Citéis	44		Pessac-Candeau <=> UNITEC
Flexo	48	Pessac / Mérignac (Lundi au Vendredi)	Pessac-Haut Livrac <=> Mérignac-Le Burck puis zone flexo comprenant la zone d'emploi de Mérignac
Flexo	54	Pessac-Bersol (Soirée)	Fontaine d'Arlac <=> zone flexo de la ZI de Bersol <=> Bougnard
Ligne	87		Pessac Centre <=> Villenave-d'Ornon-Piscine Chambéry

== Close by ==
- Pessac Centre tram stop
- City hall of Pessac
