= Saint-Nicolas tram stop =

Tram stop in Bordeaux, France

Saint-Nicolas
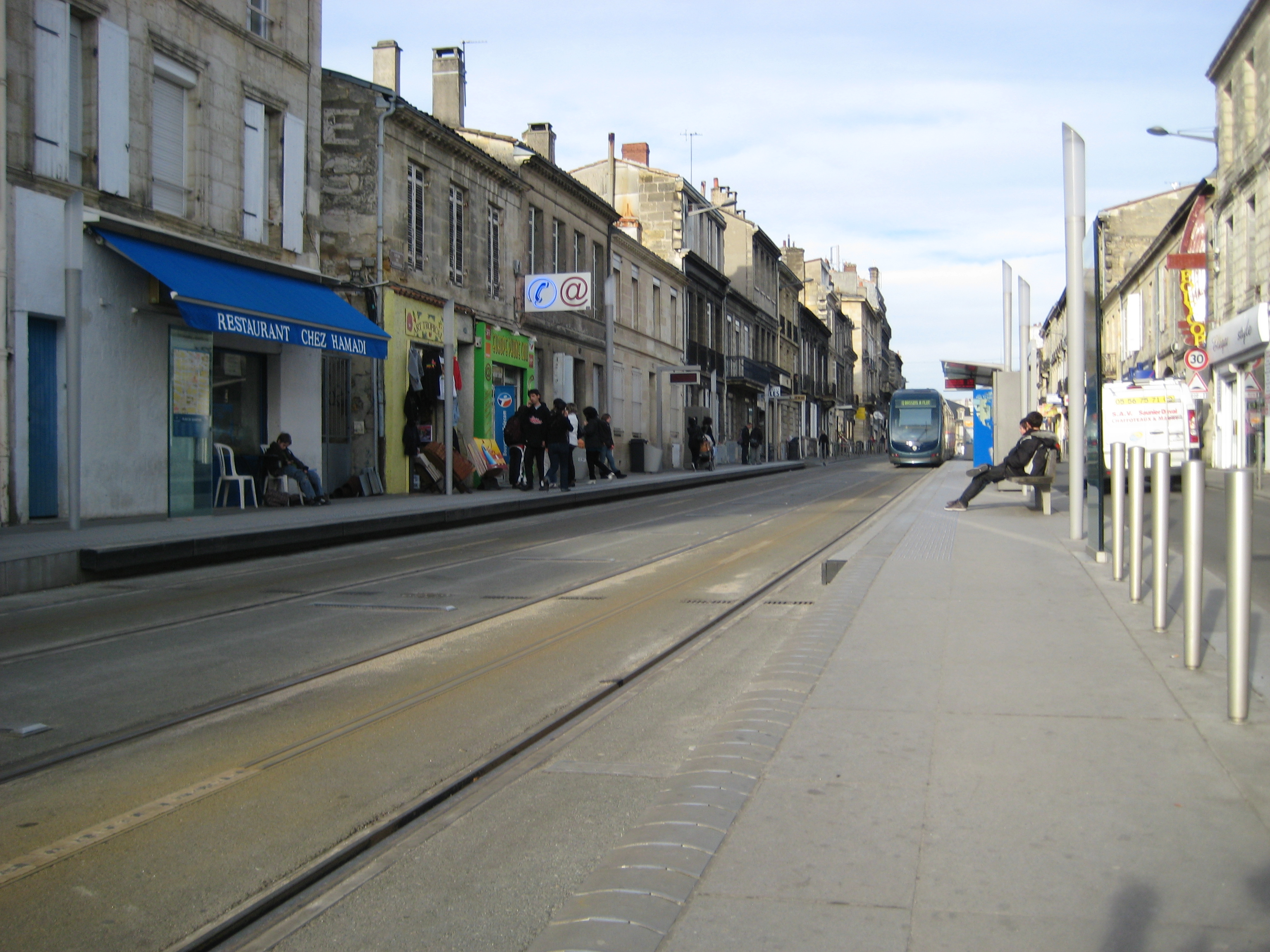
- The stop in 2009

General information
- Location: Bordeaux; France
- Coordinates: 44°49′44″N 0°34′26″W
- Line: Line B

Construction
- Architect: Elizabeth de Portzamparc

History
- Opened: 15 May 2004

Services
| Preceding station | Bordeaux tramway | Following station |
|---|---|---|
| Bergonié towards France Alouette or Pessac Centre | Line B | Victoire towards Berges de la Garonne |
Location
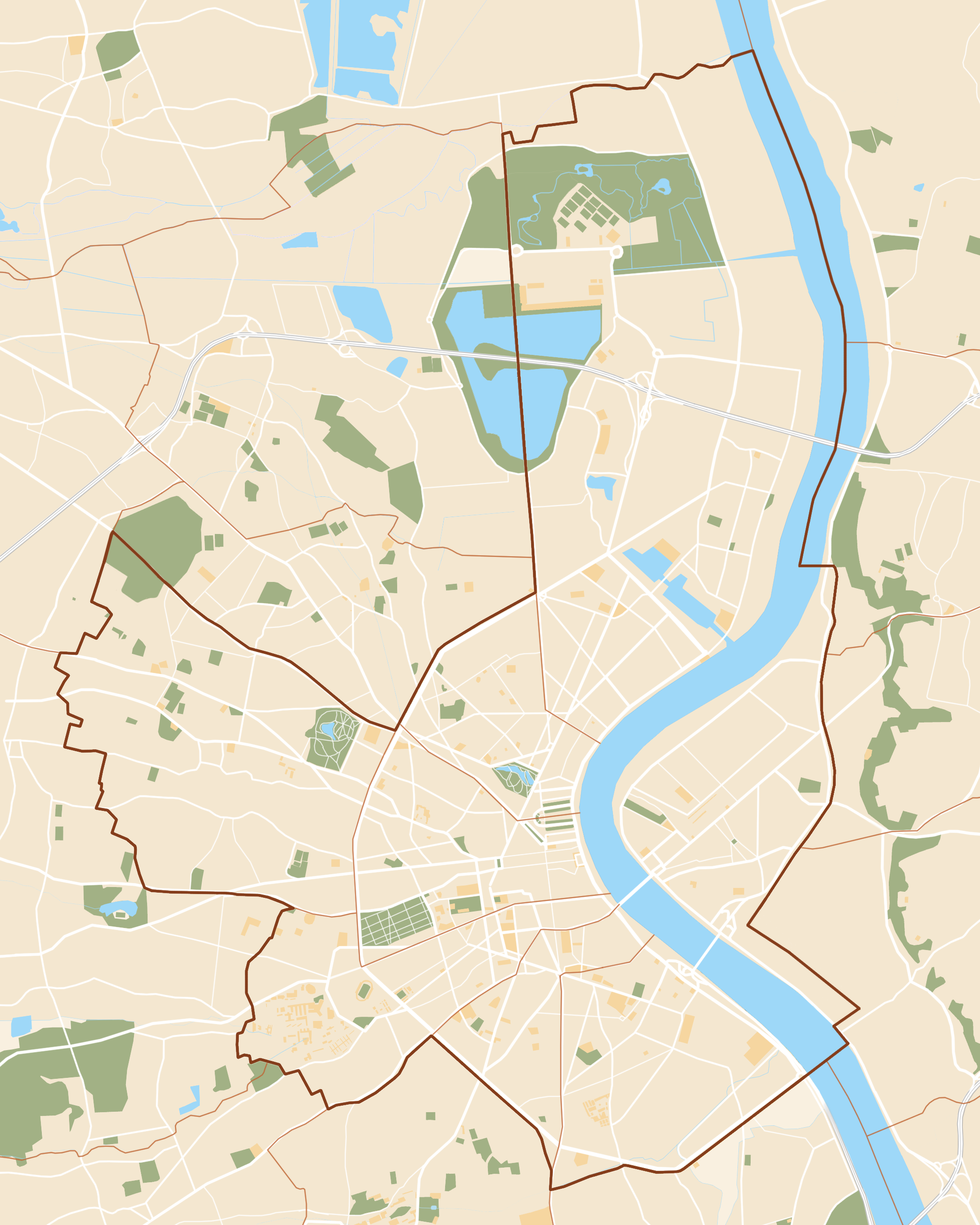
- Location within Bordeaux Location within Nouvelle-Aquitaine

Saint-Nicolas tram stop is located on line B of the Tramway de Bordeaux, and served as terminus of that line between 24 April 2004, when the line opened, and 3 July 2004, when the line was extended to Bougnard. The stop is located in the commune of Bordeaux and is operated by Transports Bordeaux Métropole.

For most of the day on Mondays to Fridays, trams run at least every five minutes in both directions through the tram stop.

== Close by ==
- Argonne
- Église Saint-Nicolas
