= Cracovie tram stop =

Tram station in Bordeaux, France

Cracovie

General information
- Location: Bordeaux / Bruges; France
- Coordinates: 44°52′16″N 0°34′35″W
- Line: Line C

History
- Opened: 17 December 2016

Services
Preceding station	Bordeaux tramway	Following station
Les Aubiers towards Parc des Expositions - Stade Matmut-Atlantique	Line C	Place Ravezies towards Villenave Pyrénées
La Vache towards Gare de Blanquefort	Line C	Place Ravezies towards Villenave Pyrénées
Location
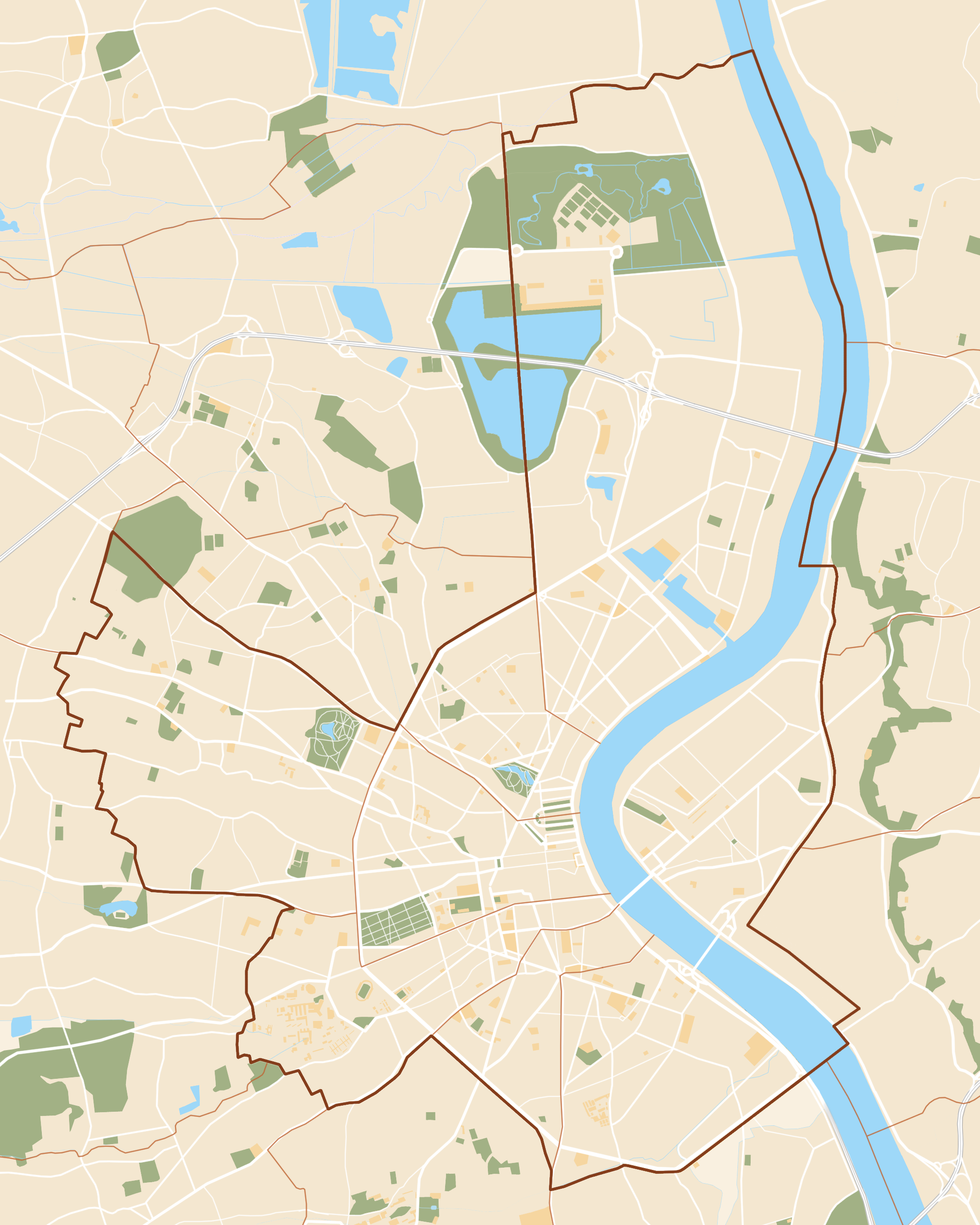
- Location within Bordeaux Location within Nouvelle-Aquitaine Location within France

Cracovie tram stop is a tram stop on line C of the Tramway de Bordeaux. It is located on Allée de Boutaut, which forms the boundary between the city of Bordeaux and the commune of Bruges. The line that the stop is situated on opened on 27 February 2008, when Line C was extended north from Grand Parc to Les Aubiers, but the tram stop itself dates from 17 December 2016, when a new branch of line C was opened from just north of Cracovie to Gare de Blanquefort. The stop is operated by Transports Bordeaux Métropole.

For most of the day on Mondays to Fridays, trams run at least every five minutes in both directions, with alternate northbound trains taking the two branches. Services run less frequently in the early morning, late evenings, weekends and public holidays.

The tram stop has two tracks, served by two side platforms, and is situated in the central reservation of the Allée de Boutaut. Immediately to the north of the stop, the branch to Gare de Blanquefort diverges to the west and joins the trackbed of the former rail link to the Bassins à flot, whilst the branch to Parc des Expositions continues in the centre of the Allée de Boutaut.
