= Saint-Michel tram stop =

Tram stop in Bordeaux, France

Saint-Michel

General information
- Location: Bordeaux; France
- Coordinates: 44.8344°N 0.5634°W
- System: Tramway
- Line: Bordeaux Tramway Line C

Construction
- Architect: E. de Portzamparc

History
- Opened: 24 April 2004

Services
Bordeaux tramway
Porte de Bourgogne	Line C	Sainte-Croix
Location

Saint-Michel (French pronunciation: [sɛ̃ miʃɛl]) station is located on Line C of the tramway de Bordeaux.

== Situation ==
The station is located at quai de la Grave in Bordeaux in the neighborhood of St-Michel known for its Sunday market. The area is home to a large population of immigrant Spanish, Portuguese, North African and Turkish.

== Junctions ==
There are no junctions with other lines or buses at this station.

== Close by ==
- Basilique Saint-Michel
- Les quais

== See also ==
- TBC
- Tramway de Bordeaux
