= Sainte-Croix tram stop =

Tram stop in Bordeaux, France

Sainte-Croix

General information
- Location: Bordeaux; France
- Coordinates: 44.8319°N 0.5594°W
- System: Tramway
- Line: Bordeaux Tramway Line C

Construction
- Architect: E. de Portzamparc

History
- Opened: 24 April 2004

Services
Bordeaux tramway
Saint-Michel	Line C	Tauzia
Location

Sainte-Croix station is located on line of the tramway de Bordeaux.

== Location ==
The station is located on Sainte-Croix quay in Bordeaux.

== Close by ==
- Église Sainte-Croix
- Conservatoire
- The quays

== See also ==
- TBC
- Tramway de Bordeaux
