= Bougnard tram stop =

Tram stop in Pessac, France

Bougnard

General information
- Location: Pessac; France
- Coordinates: 44°47′39″N 0°38′03″W
- Line: Line B

Construction
- Architect: Elizabeth de Portzamparc

History
- Opened: 3 July 2004

Services
Preceding station	Bordeaux tramway	Following station
Camponac Médiathèque towards Pessac Centre	Line B	Saige towards Berges de la Garonne
Chataigneraie towards France Alouette	Line B	Saige towards Berges de la Garonne
Location
- Location within Nouvelle-Aquitaine Location within France

Bougnard tram stop is located on line B of the Tramway de Bordeaux, and served as terminus of that line between 3 July 2004, when the line was extended from Saint-Nicolas, and 29 May 2007, when the line was extended to Pessac Centre. The stop is located on Avenue Bougnard in the commune of Pessac and is operated by Transports Bordeaux Métropole.

To the west of Bougnard, line B divides into two branches, one running north to Pessac Centre and the other west to France Alouette. For most of the day on Mondays to Fridays, trams run at least every five minutes between the city centre and Bougnard, with services every ten minutes on the two branches. Services run less frequently in the early morning, late evenings, weekends and public holidays.

== Interchange ==
=== TBM bus network ===
This stop serves as a terminus for some bus lines, enabling their connections with the tramway.

N.	Course	Link	Exploitant
21	Talence-Peixotto <=> Gradignan-Stade Ornon	21	TBM
31	Gradignan-Village 5 <=> Bassens-Quai Français	31	TBM
35	Bordeaux-Cracovie <=> Talence-Peixotto	35	TBM
58	Gradignan-Village 5 <=> Bordeaux-Base sous marine	58	TBM

== Close by ==
- Parc-relais Bougnard
