= Pessac Centre tram stop =

Tram stop in Pessac, France

Pessac Centre
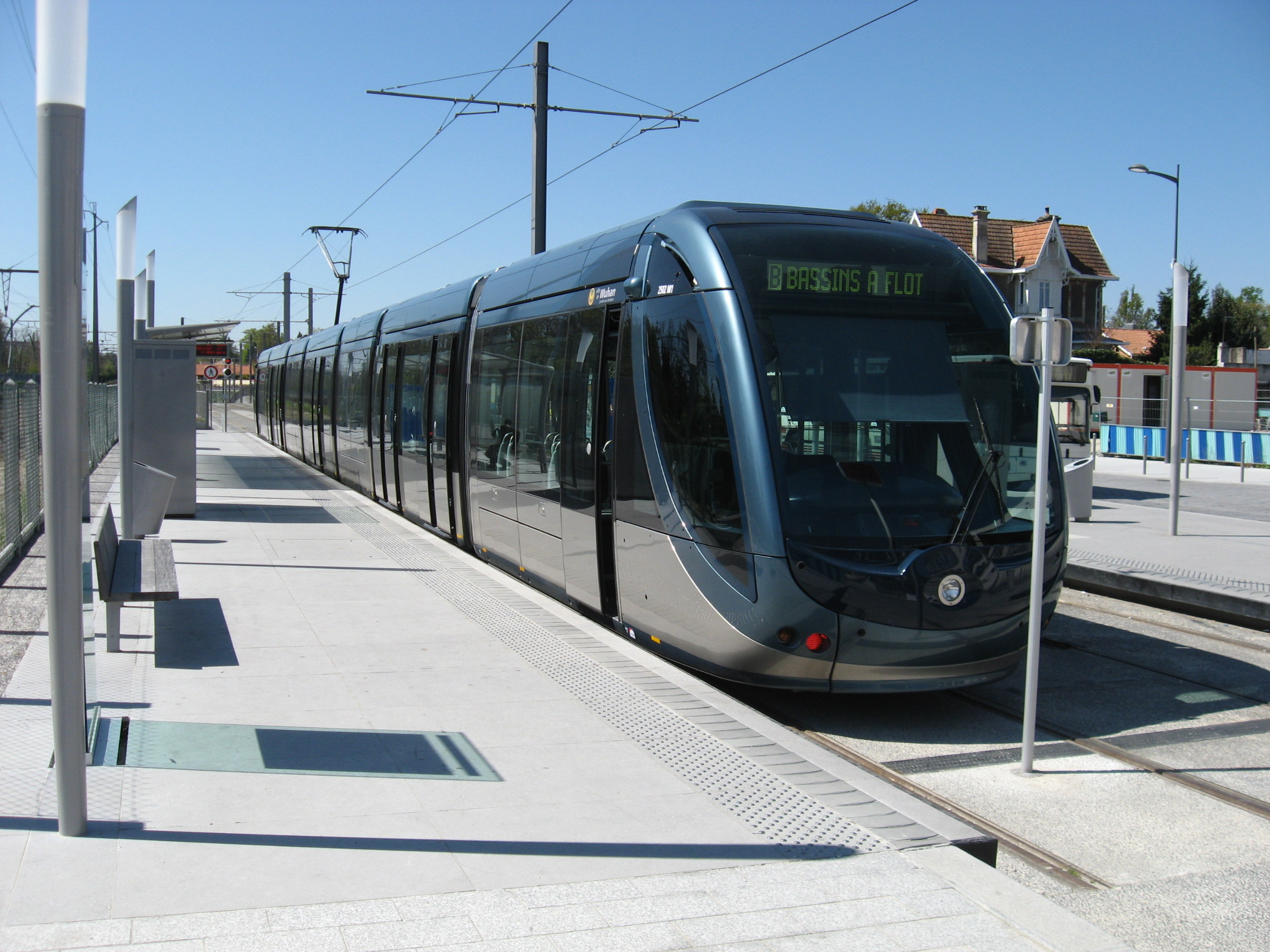
- A tram at the stop in 2009

General information
- Location: Pessac; France
- Coordinates: 44°48′15″N 0°37′57″W
- Line: Line B

Construction
- Architect: Elizabeth de Portzamparc

History
- Opened: 29 May 2007

Services
Preceding station	Bordeaux tramway	Following station
Terminus	Line B	Camponac Médiathèque towards Berges de la Garonne
Location
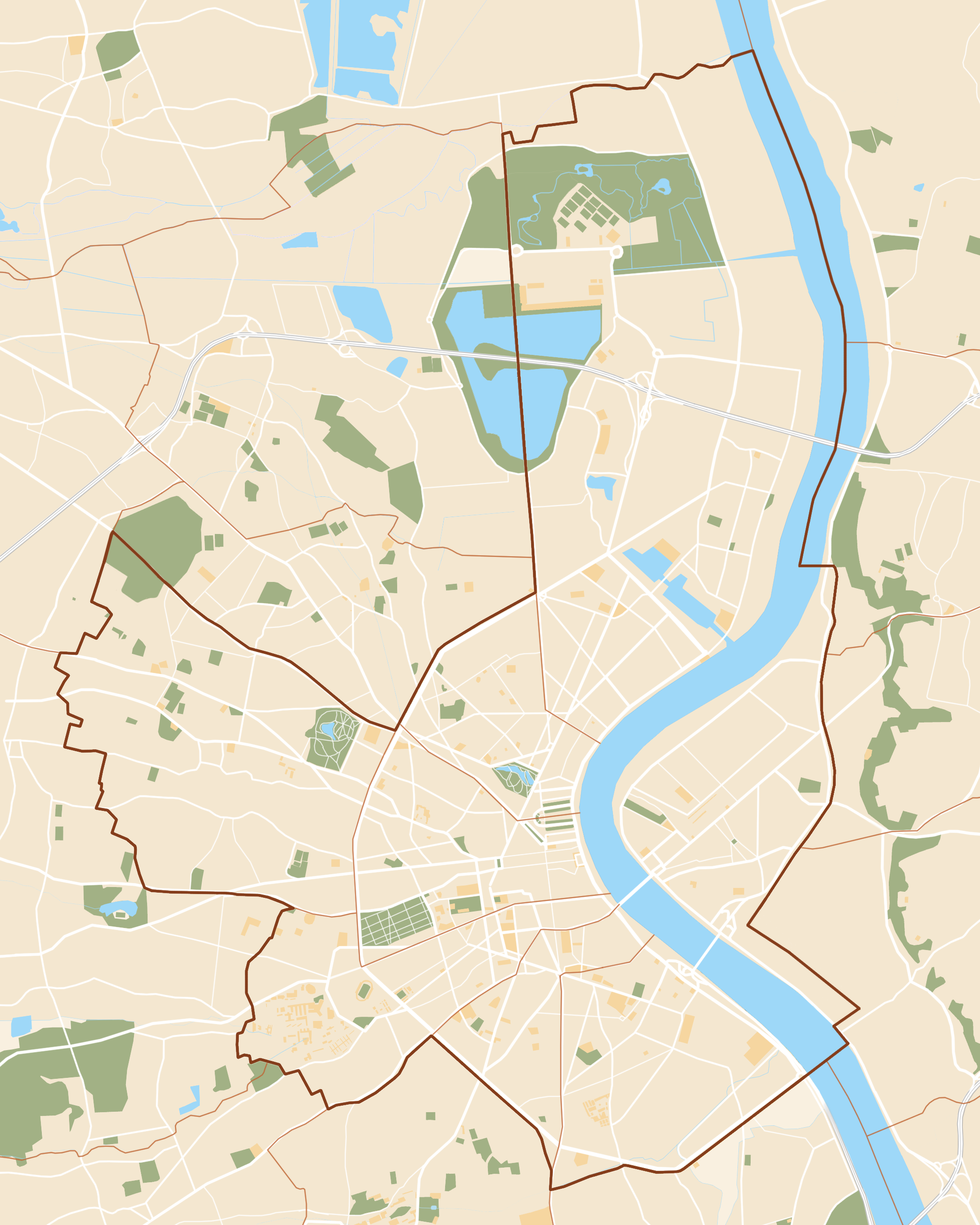
- Location within Bordeaux Location within Nouvelle-Aquitaine Location within France

Pessac Centre tram stop is the terminus of the Pessac Centre branch of line B of the Bordeaux tramway, and is located on Avenue Eugène et Marc Dulout in the centre of the commune of Pessac. The tram stop is adjacent to Pessac railway station, with direct access between station and tram stop platforms, and the Mairie de Pessac.

The stop was inaugurated 29 May 2007, when line B was extended from Bougnard. It remained the sole terminus at the southern end of line B until April 2015, when a second branch was opened from Bougnard to France Alouette. The stop is operated by Transports Bordeaux Métropole.

For most of the day on Mondays to Fridays, trams run at least every ten minutes between Pessac Centre and Bordeaux city centre. Services run less frequently in the early morning, late evenings, weekends and public holidays.

== Interchanges ==
=== SNCF ===
Trains calling at Pessac railway station

=== Buses of the TBC ===
Liane	4		Bordeaux-St Louis <=> Pessac-Magonty
Ligne	23		Fontaine d'Arlac <=> Pessac-Romainville ou Toctoucau
Ligne	24		Porte de Bourgogne <=> Pessac-Bougnard
Corol	35		Peixotto <=> Les Aubiers
Corol	36		Gare de Pessac <=> Bègles Terres Neuves
Citéis	42		Mérignac-Lycée Daguin (operation buckles some around Mérignac)
Citéis	44		Pessac-Candeau <=> UNITEC
Flexo	48	Pessac / Mérignac (Lundi au Vendredi)	Pessac-Haut Livrac <=> Mérignac-Le Burck puis zone flexo comprenant la zone d'emploi de Mérignac
Flexo	54	Pessac-Bersol (Soirée)	Fontaine d'Arlac <=> zone flexo de la ZI de Bersol <=> Bougnard
Ligne	87		Pessac Centre <=> Villenave d'Ornon-Piscine Chambéry
