= Terres Neuves tram stop =

Tram stop in Bègles, France

Terres Neuves
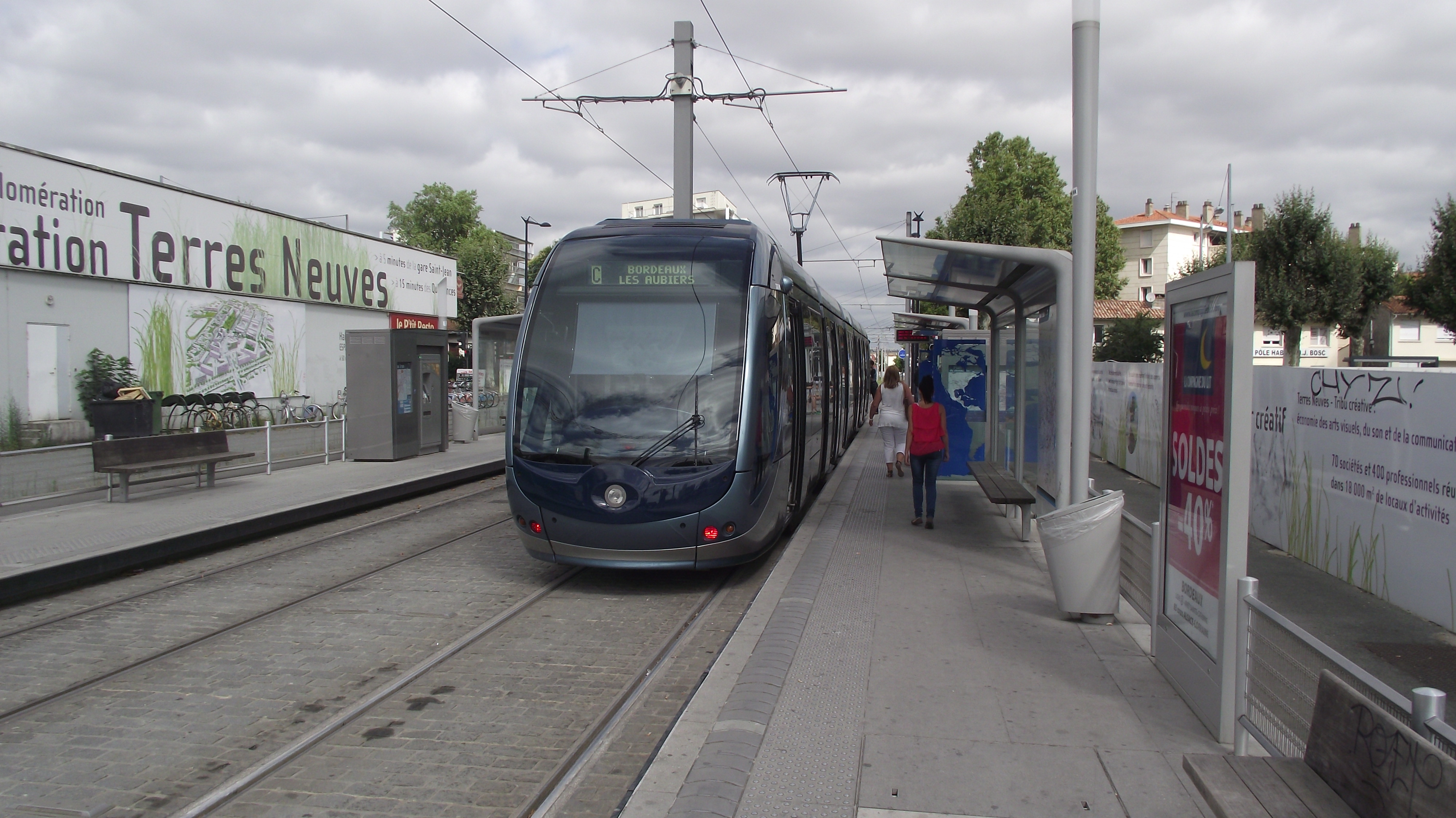

General information
- Location: Bègles; France
- Coordinates: 44°48′55″N 0°33′03″W
- System: Tramway
- Line: Bordeaux Tramway Line C

Construction
- Architect: E. de Portzamparc

History
- Opened: 27 February 2008

Services
Preceding station	Bordeaux tramway	Following station
Carle Vernet towards Gare de Blanquefort or Parc des Expositions - Stade Matmut-Atlantique	Line C	La Belle Rose towards Villenave Pyrénées
Location
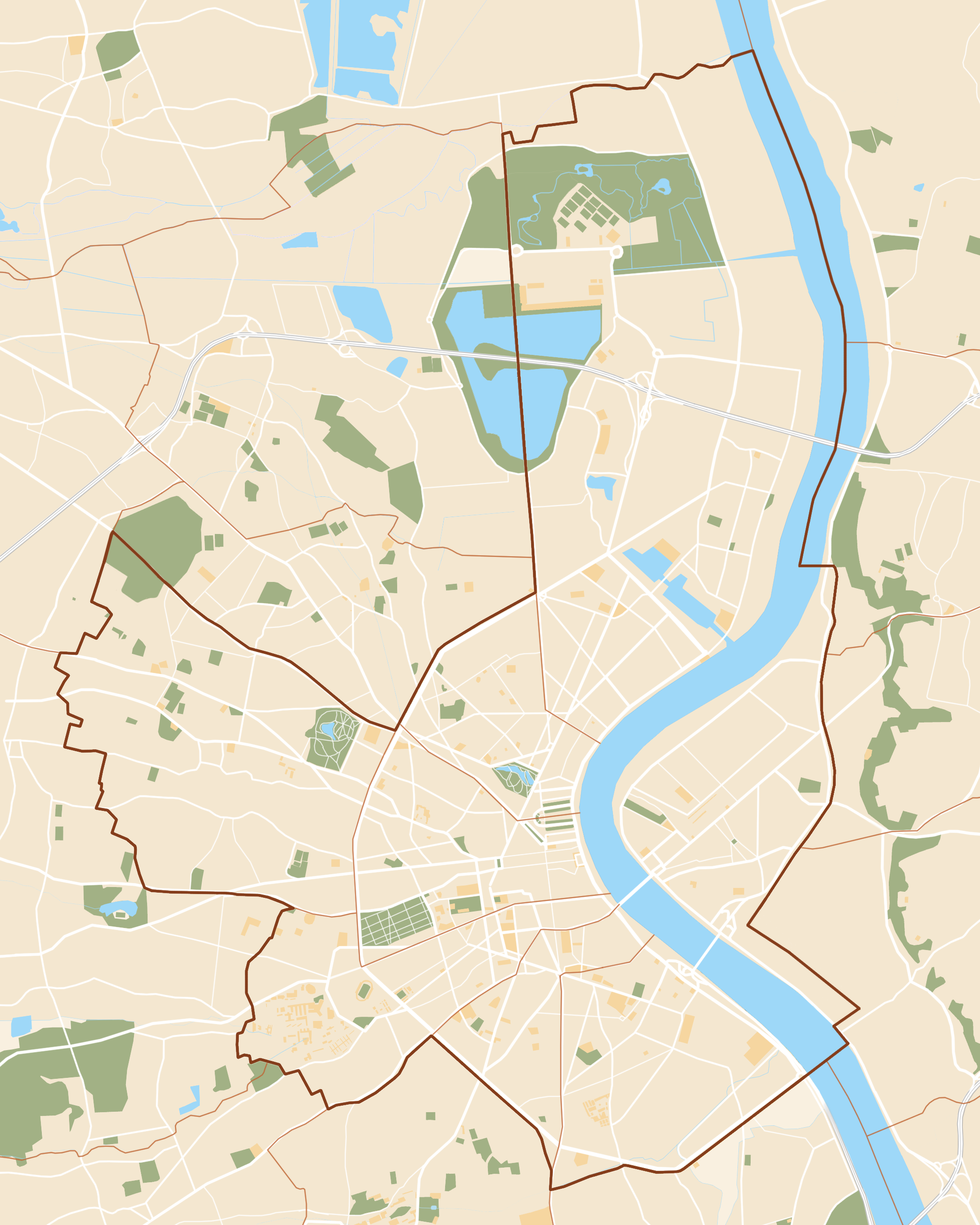
- Location within Bordeaux Location within Nouvelle-Aquitaine Location within France

Terres Neuves tram stop is a tram stop on line C of the Tramway de Bordeaux. It is located near Boulevard Jean-Jacques Bosc in the commune of Bègles. The stop opened on 27 February 2008, when Line C was extended south from Gare Saint-Jean, and was the southern terminus of Line C until a further extension to Lycée Vaclav Havel opened in March 2015. The stop is operated by Transports Bordeaux Métropole.

For most of the day from Mondays to Fridays, trams run at least every five minutes in both directions. Services run less frequently in the early morning, late evenings, weekends, and public holidays.

== Interchanges ==
- Buses of the TBC:

Liane	11	Bègles-Rives d'Arcins <=> Mérignac-ZI du Phare ou Mérignac-Beaudésert ou Le Haillan-5 Chemins
Ligne	26	Quinconces <=> Bègles-Le Dorat
Corol	36	Gare de Pessac <=> Bègles Terres Neuves
