= Portzamparc =

Portzamparc is a surname. Notable people with the surname include:

- Christian de Portzamparc (born 1944), French architect
- Elizabeth de Portzamparc, French-Brazilian architect
