= Berges du Lac tram stop =

Tram station in Bordeaux, France

Berges du Lac
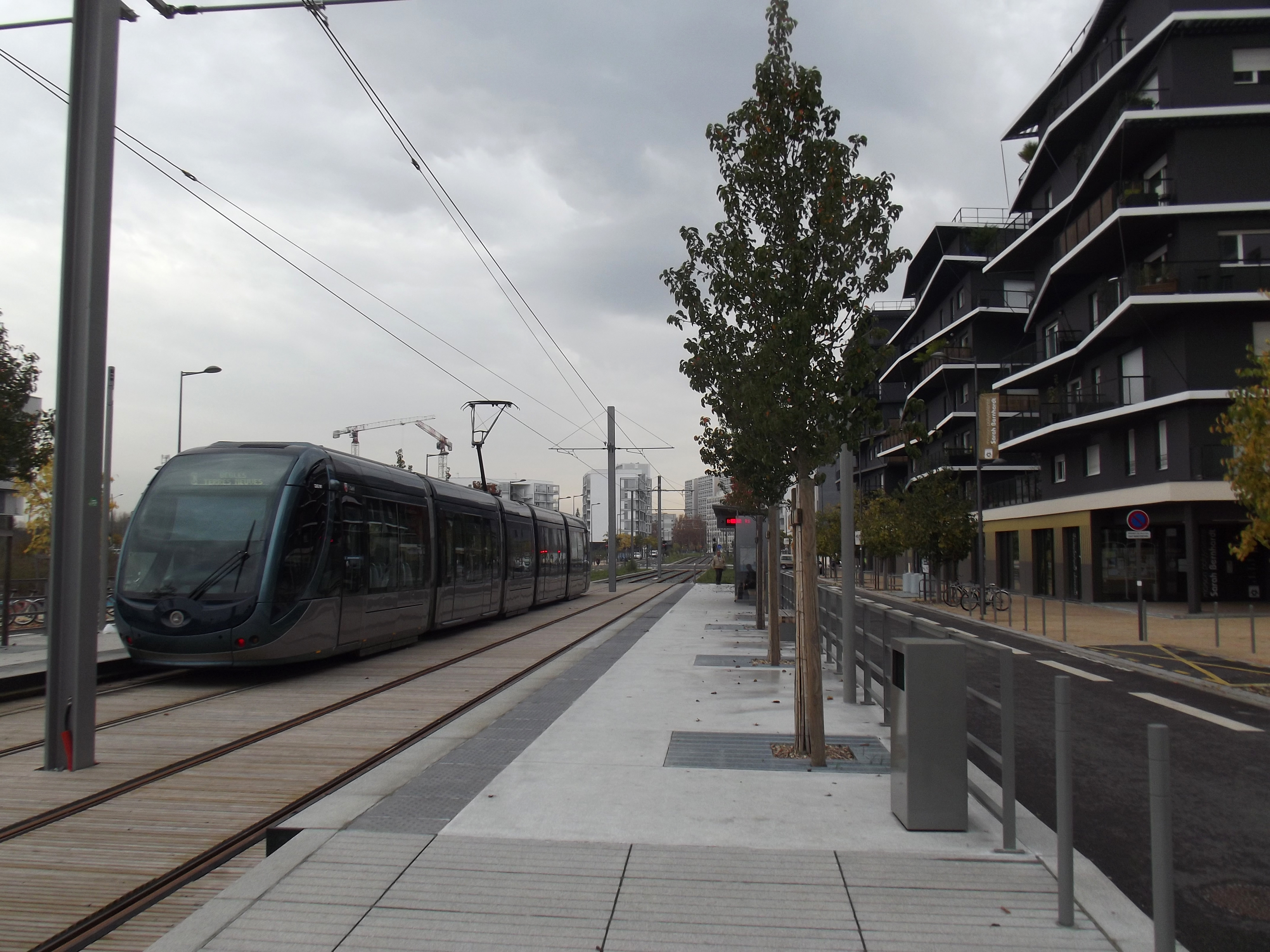

General information
- Location: Bordeaux; France
- Coordinates: 44°52′45″N 0°34′15″W
- Line: Line C

History
- Opened: 1 February 2014

Services
Preceding station	Bordeaux tramway	Following station
Les Aubiers towards Parc des Expositions - Stade Matmut-Atlantique	Line C	Quarante Journaux towards Villenave Pyrénées
Location
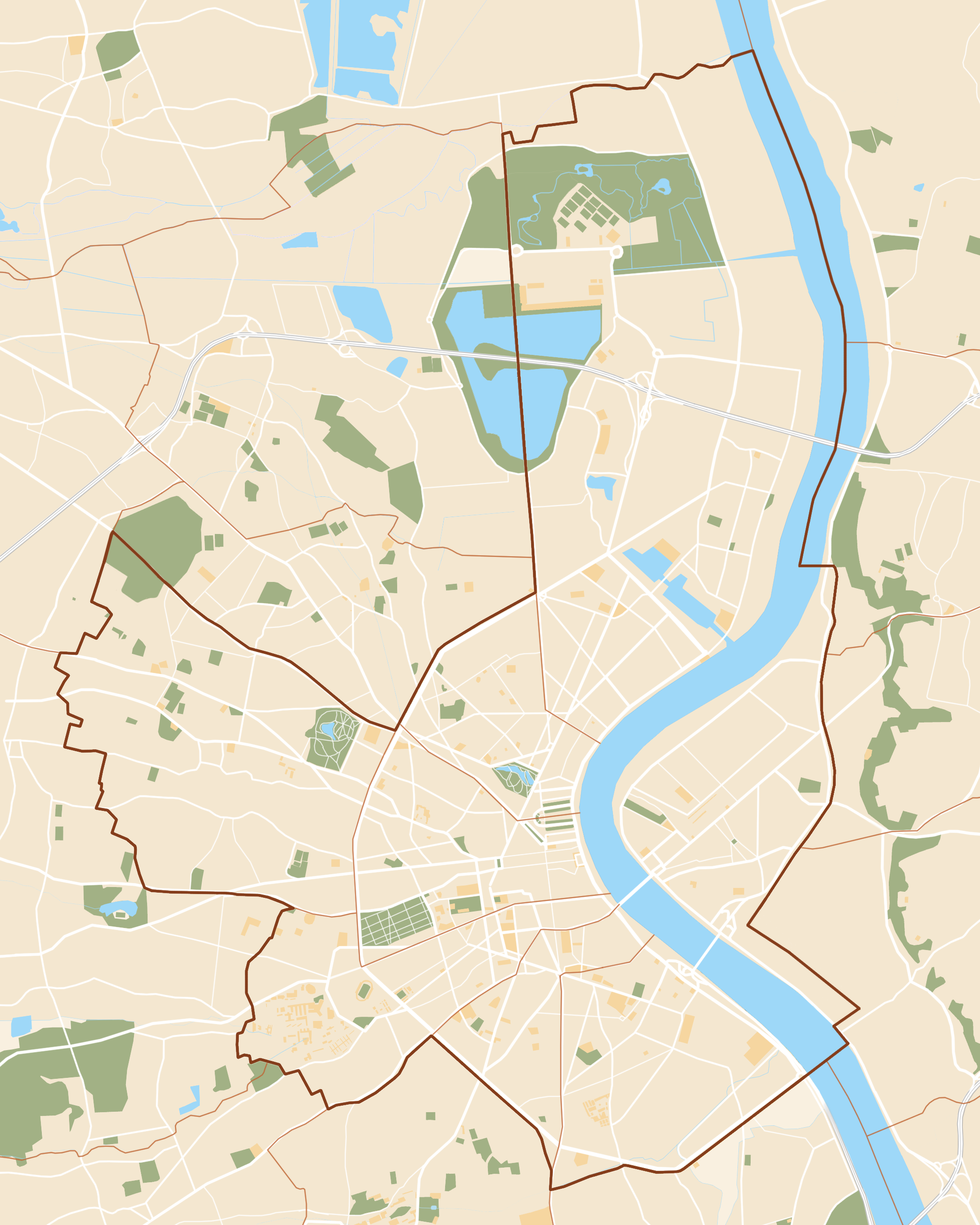
- Location within Bordeaux Location within Nouvelle-Aquitaine Location within France

Berges du Lac tram stop is a tram stop on line C of the Tramway de Bordeaux. It is located on Cours de Québec in the north of the city of Bordeaux. The stop opened on 1 February 2014, when Line C was extended north from Les Aubiers, and was the northern terminus of Line C until a further extension to Parc des Expositions opened on 24 January 2015. The stop is operated by Transports Bordeaux Métropole.

For most of the day on Mondays to Fridays, trams run at least every ten minutes in both directions. Services run less frequently in the early morning, late evenings, weekends and public holidays.
