= Cité du Vin =

- Cité du Vin
- Established: 31 May 2016
- Location: Bordeaux, France
- Coordinates: 44.8625°N 0.5503°W
- Type: Museum
- Architects: XTU agency: Anouk Legendre & Nicolas Desmazières
- Public transit access: Bordeaux tramway
- Website: Official website

The Cité du Vin is a museum located in Bordeaux, France that also hosts exhibitions, shows, movie projections, and academic seminars, generally centered around wine-related themes.

Following its initial opening in June of 2017, the Cité du Vin reached a milestone of one million visitors in the fall of 2018 and passed 2 million visitors in May of 2022.

== Construction ==
=== Architects ===
The building's design was led by Anouk Legendre and Nicholas Desmazières of XTU Agency.

=== Cost ===
During initial planning stages in January 2011, the cost of construction was anticipated to be approximately 63 million euros excluding taxes. However, by 2015, a year before the building's opening, the total cost of construction had increased to an estimated 81.1 million euros excluding taxes.

== History and opening ==
The project for a wine cultural and tourist center started in 2009. An association prefiguring La Cité du Vin was created for this purpose, made up of representatives from the Aquitaine region, Bordeaux Métropole, the city of Bordeaux, the Interprofessional Council of Bordeaux wine and the Bordeaux Chamber of Commerce and Industry.

Its official opening by the President of France François Hollande and Alain Juppé took place on May 31, 2016. It was followed by the public opening on June 1, 2016.

== Transportation ==
The Cité du Vin is accessible by tram (the Cité du Vin tram stop is on line B of the Bordeaux tramway), by the ring road, by the Pont Jacques Chaban-Delmas and by lines 7 and 32 of the Transports Bordeaux Métropole (TBM) network. A stop of the Batcub is located nearby.

== Gallery ==

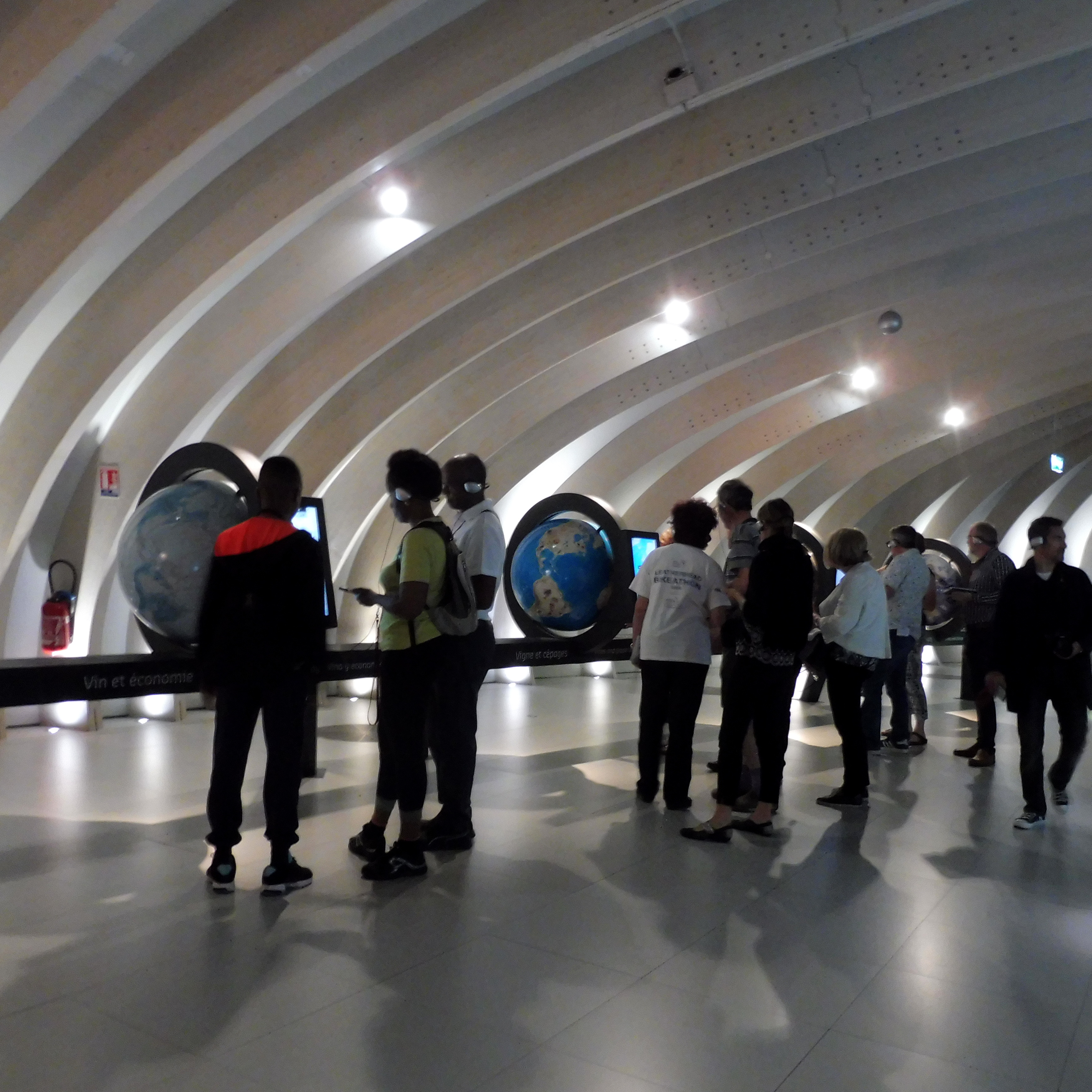
The permanent exhibition

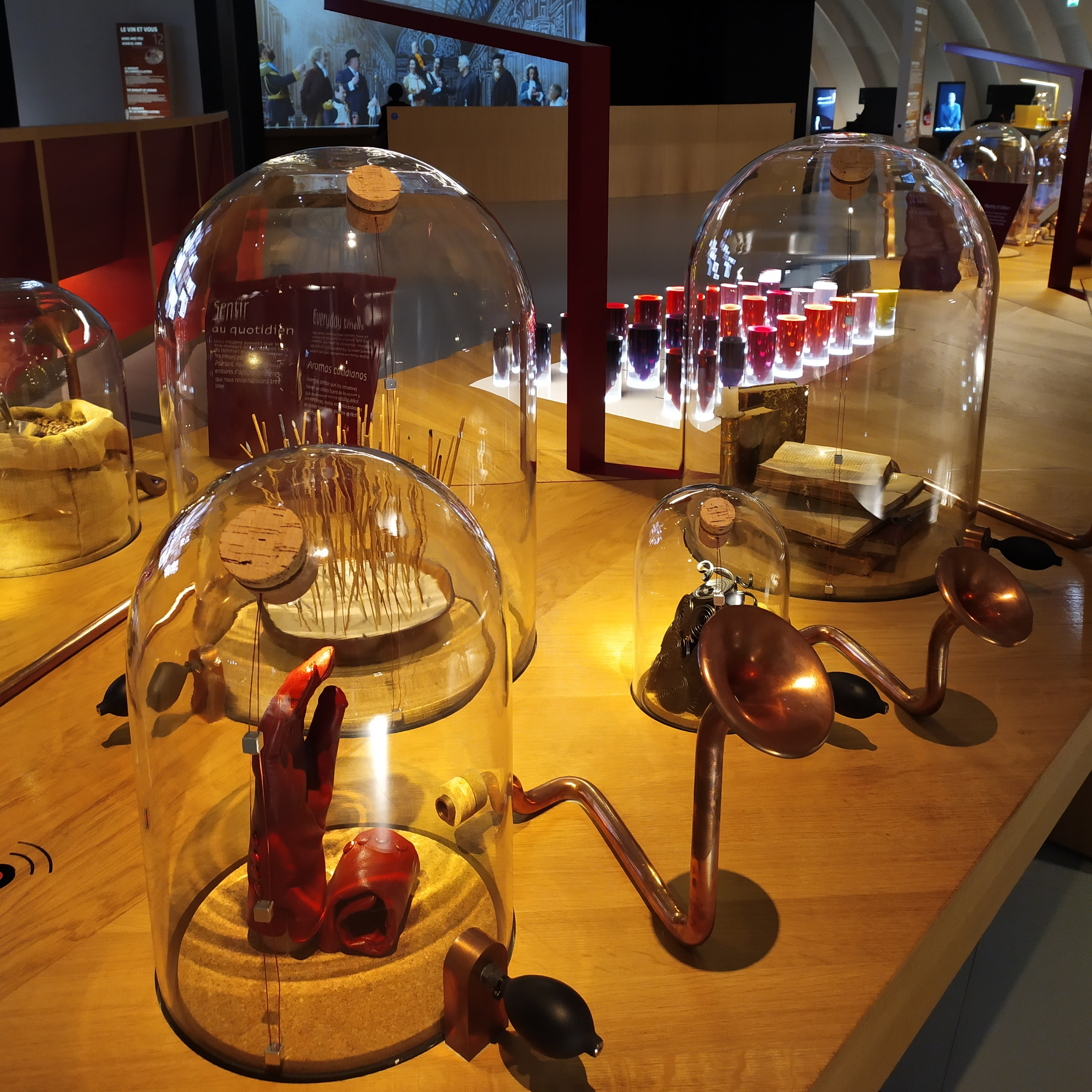
The buffet of the five senses
