= Grand Parc tram stop =

Tram stop in Bordeaux, France

Grand Parc

General information
- Location: Bordeaux; France
- Coordinates: 44°51′44″N 0°34′31″W
- System: Tramway
- Line: Bordeaux Tramway Line C

History
- Opened: 19 November 2007

Services
Preceding station	Bordeaux tramway	Following station
Place Ravezies - Le Bouscat towards Gare de Blanquefort or Parc des Expositions - Stade Matmut-Atlantique	Line C	Émile Counord towards Villenave Pyrénées
Location
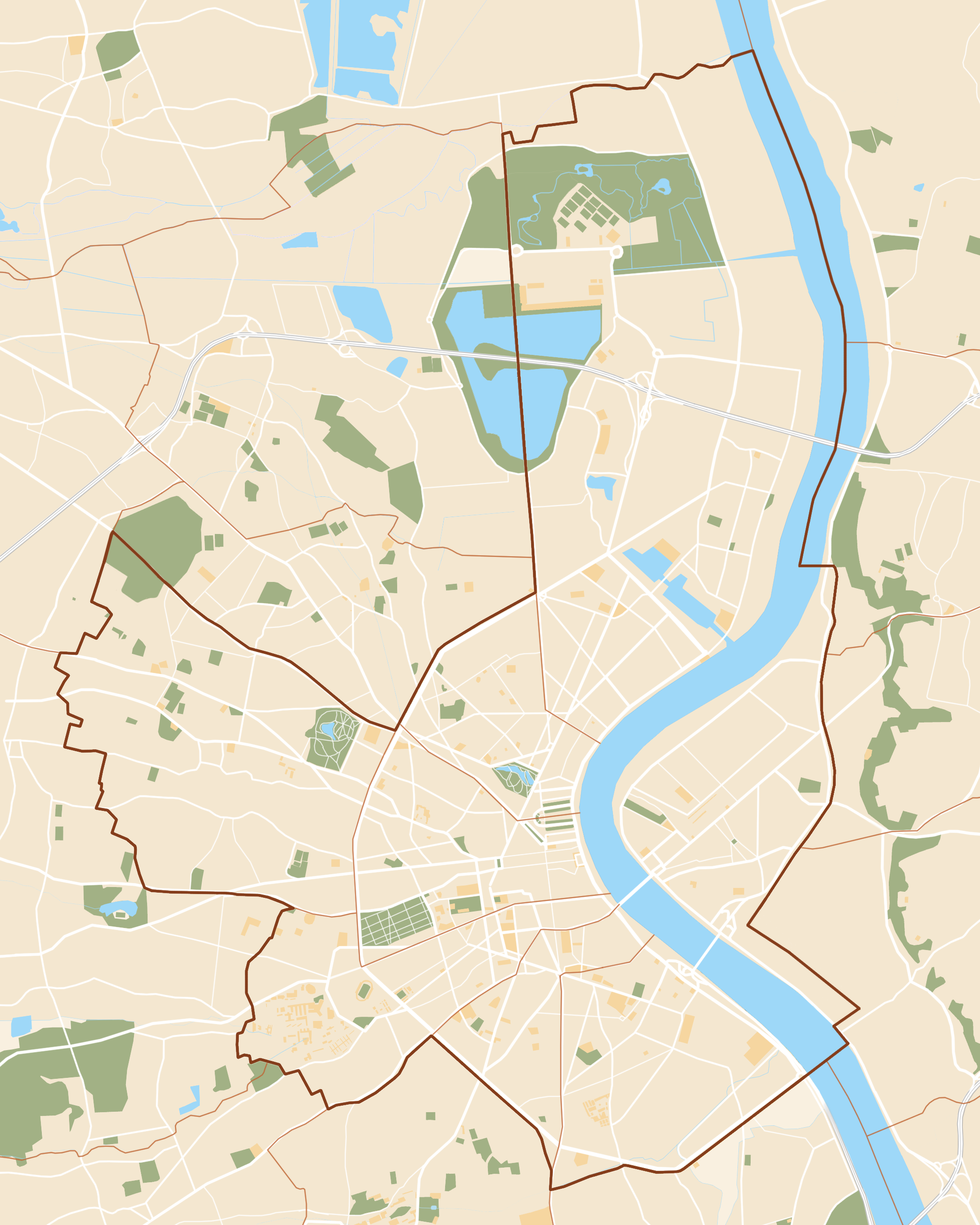
- Location within Bordeaux Location within Nouvelle-Aquitaine Location within France

Grand Parc tram stop is a tram stop on line C of the Tramway de Bordeaux. It is located on Avenue Emile Counord in the city of Bordeaux. The stop opened on 19 November 2007, when Line C was extended north from Quinconces, and was the northern terminus of Line C until a further extension to Les Aubiers opened on 27 February 2008. The stop is operated by Transports Bordeaux Métropole.

For most of the day on Mondays to Fridays, trams run at least every five minutes in both directions. Services run less frequently in the early morning, late evenings, weekends and public holidays.

== Close by ==
- Grand Parc
