= Eysines Cantinolle tram stop =

Tram station in France

Eysines Cantinolle
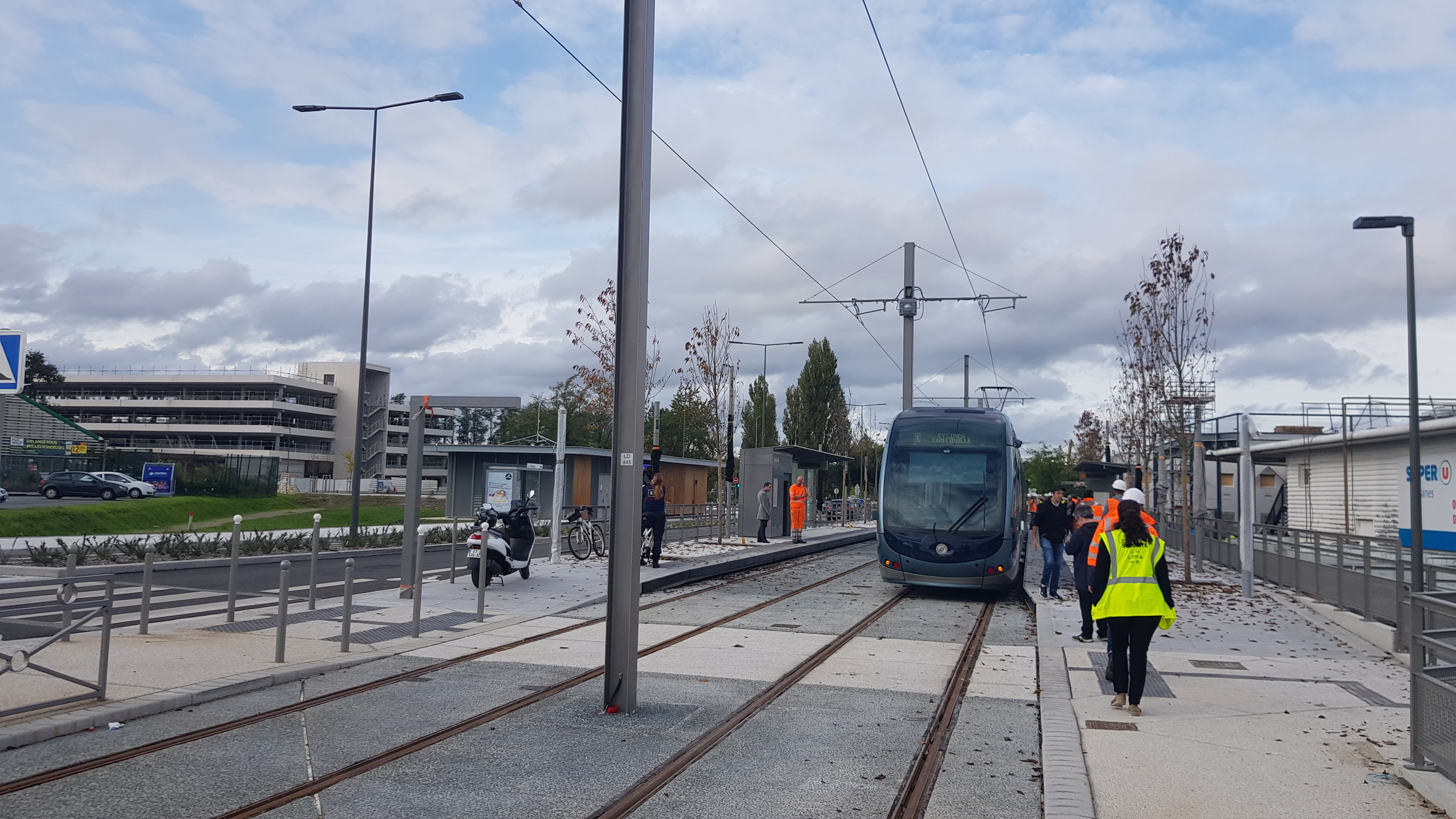

General information
- Location: Eysines; France
- Coordinates: 44°53′31″N 0°40′03″W
- Line: Line D
- Connections: Transports Bordeaux Métropole buses

History
- Opened: 29 February 2020

Services
Preceding station	Bordeaux tramway	Following station
Terminus	Line D	Les Sources towards Carle Vernet
Location
- Location within Nouvelle-Aquitaine Location within France

Eysines Cantinolle tram stop is a stop on the Bordeaux tramway in the commune of Eysines, France. It is the current northwestern terminus of Bordeaux Tramway Line D and opened on 29 February 2020.

== Services ==
The following services stop at Cantinolle:

- Bordeaux tramway Line D: service every fifteen minutes to Carle Vernet.
