= Compagnie générale française des transports et entreprises =

Former French transport company

The Compagnie générale française des transports et entreprises (English approximation: General Company of French Transport and Businesses), commonly known by the initialism CGFTE, was a company which managed public transportation networks in several French cities, including Bordeaux (TBC), Nancy (Stan ), Rouen (TCAR) and Chambéry (Stac). It was formed in 1953 from Compagnie Générale Française de Tramways (CGFT), which was created in 1875.

It was acquired by Compagnie Générale des Eaux (CGE) in 1980, and later absorbed into CGE subsidiary CGEA Transport. CGEA Transport later became Connex in 1999, then Veolia Transport in 2005, and is now part of the Transdev group. In 2003, Vivendi Environnement was renamed to Veolia Environnement.
