= Les Aubiers tram stop =

Tram stop in Bordeaux, France

Les Aubiers
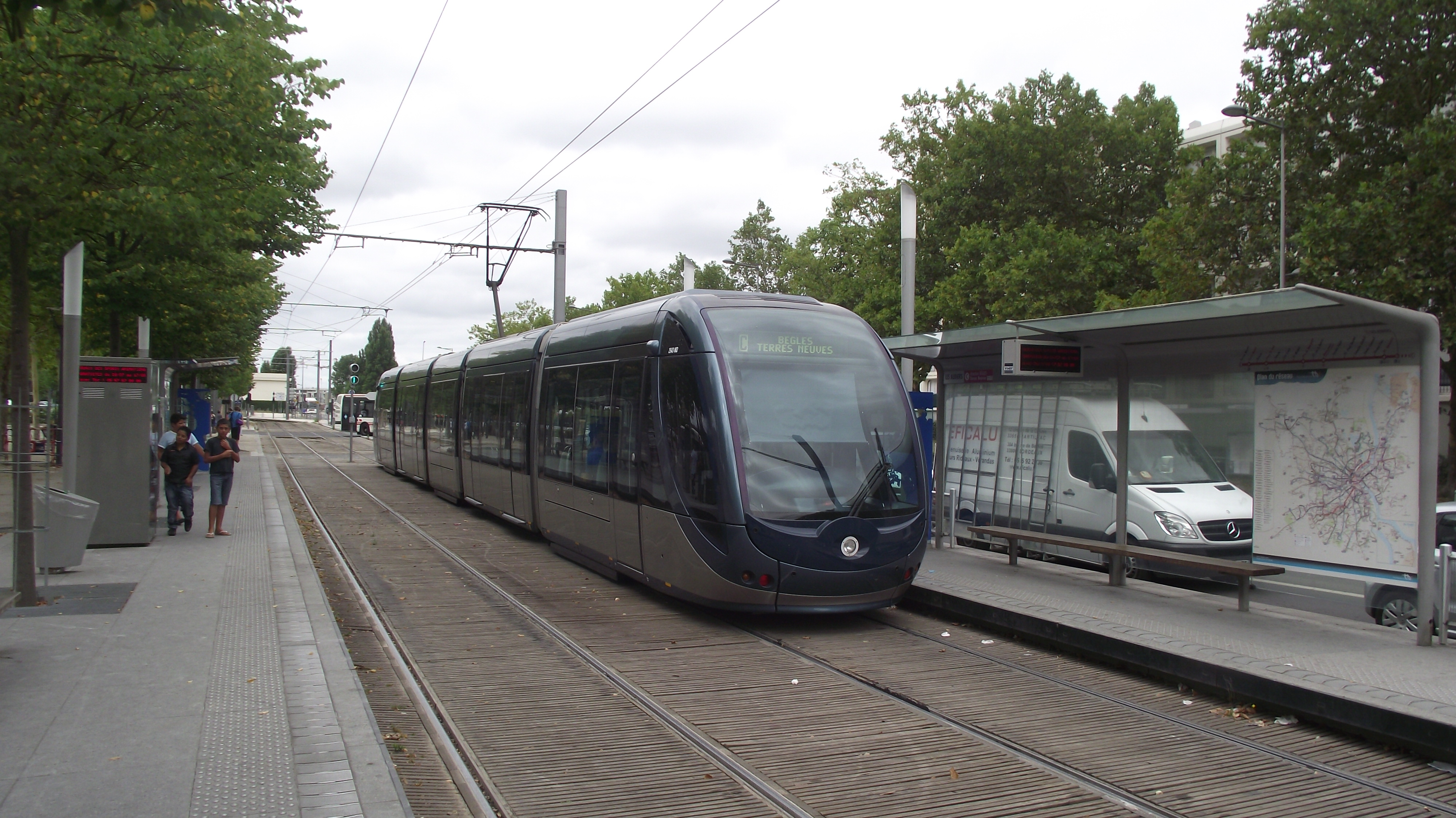
- A tram at the stop in 2012

General information
- Location: Bordeaux; France
- Coordinates: 44°52′26″N 0°34′27″W
- Line: Line C

History
- Opened: 27 February 2008

Services
Preceding station	Bordeaux tramway	Following station
Berges du Lac towards Parc des Expositions - Stade Matmut-Atlantique	Line C	Cracovie towards Villenave Pyrénées
Location
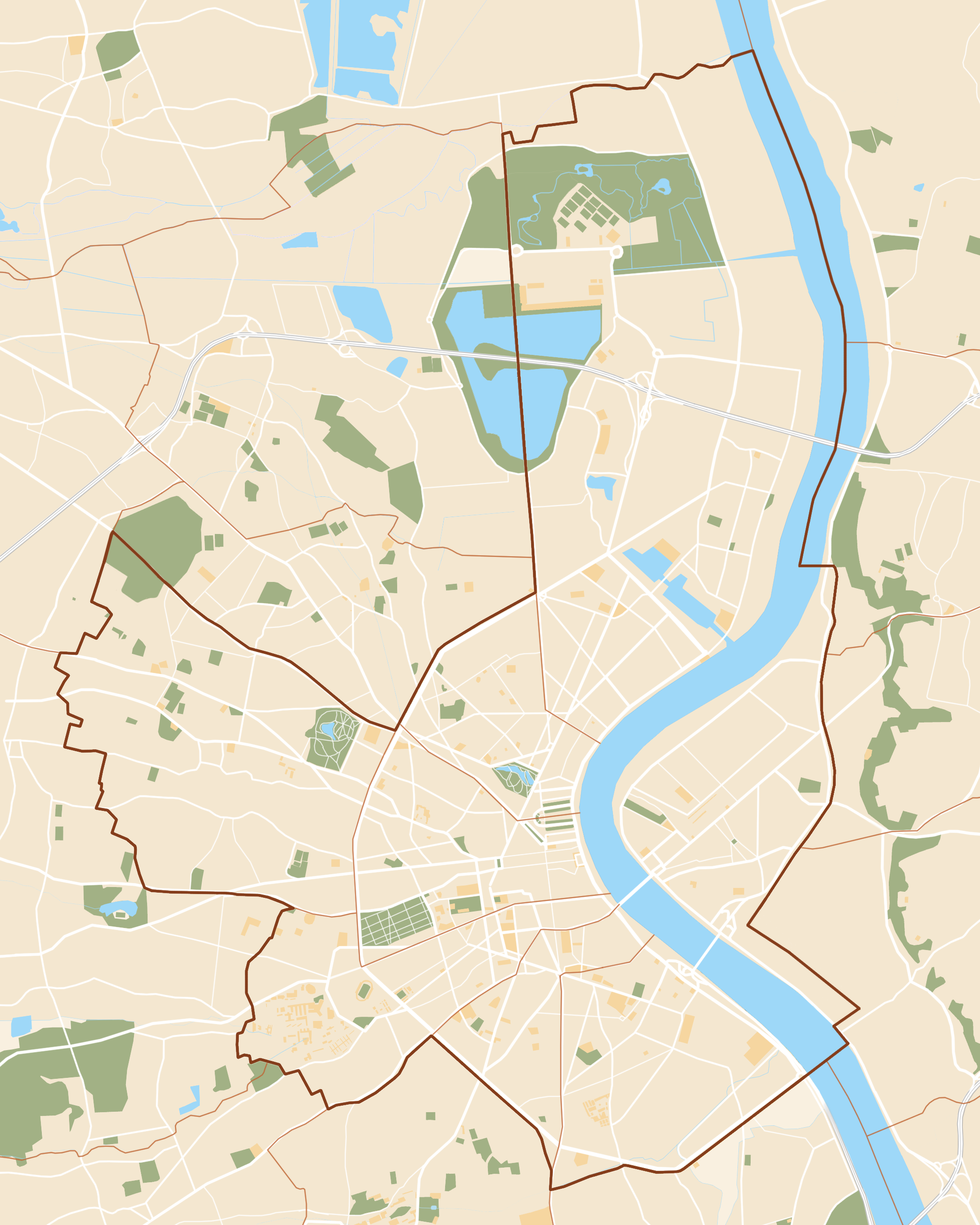
- Location within Bordeaux Location within Nouvelle-Aquitaine Location within France

Les Aubiers tram stop is a tram stop on line C of the Tramway de Bordeaux. It is located on Laroque Avenue in the north of the city of Bordeaux. The stop opened on 27 February 2008, when Line C was extended north from Grand Parc, and was the northern terminus of Line C until a further extension to Berges du Lac opened on 1 February 2014. The stop is operated by Transports Bordeaux Métropole.

For most of the day on Mondays to Fridays, trams run at least every ten minutes in both directions. Services run less frequently in the early morning, late evenings, weekends and public holidays.

When it was built, the stop was unique, in that the track bed is composed of duckboard. This is explained by the proximity of one of the sites of the Institut technologique FCBA, a research and development organisation specialising in the forest, cellulose, wood-construction and furniture sectors. Since Les Aubiers opened, several other newer stops on the northern end of line C have adopted the same flooring.

== Interchanges ==
=== TBC Network ===
Liane	7		Les Aubiers <=> Ambarès-et-Lagrave-Parabelle
Liane	15		Villenave d'Ornon-Bourg ou Pont de la Maye <=> Parc des Expositions ou Brandenburg
Corol	33		Mérignac-Soleil <=> Parc des Expositions de Bordeaux
Corol	35		Peixotto <=> Les Aubiers
Corol	37		Saint-Aubin-de-Médoc-Lycée Sud-Médoc <=> Les Aubiers
Flexo	57	Parempuyre (Soirée)	Les Aubiers <=> Parempuyre-Route de Bordeaux puis desserte de Parempuyre en soirée

=== Trans Gironde Network ===
704	Place Ravezies-Le Bouscat <=> Arsac-Bourg
705	Place Ravezies-Le Bouscat ou Pauillac-Hotel de Ville <=> Pauillac-Le Pouyalet ou Saint-Estèphe-Insup ou Cissac-Medoc-CAT Villambis
706	Place Ravezies-Le Bouscat <=> Macau -Place de L'Europe
