= Bordeaux tramway =

Tram system serving the city of Bordeaux

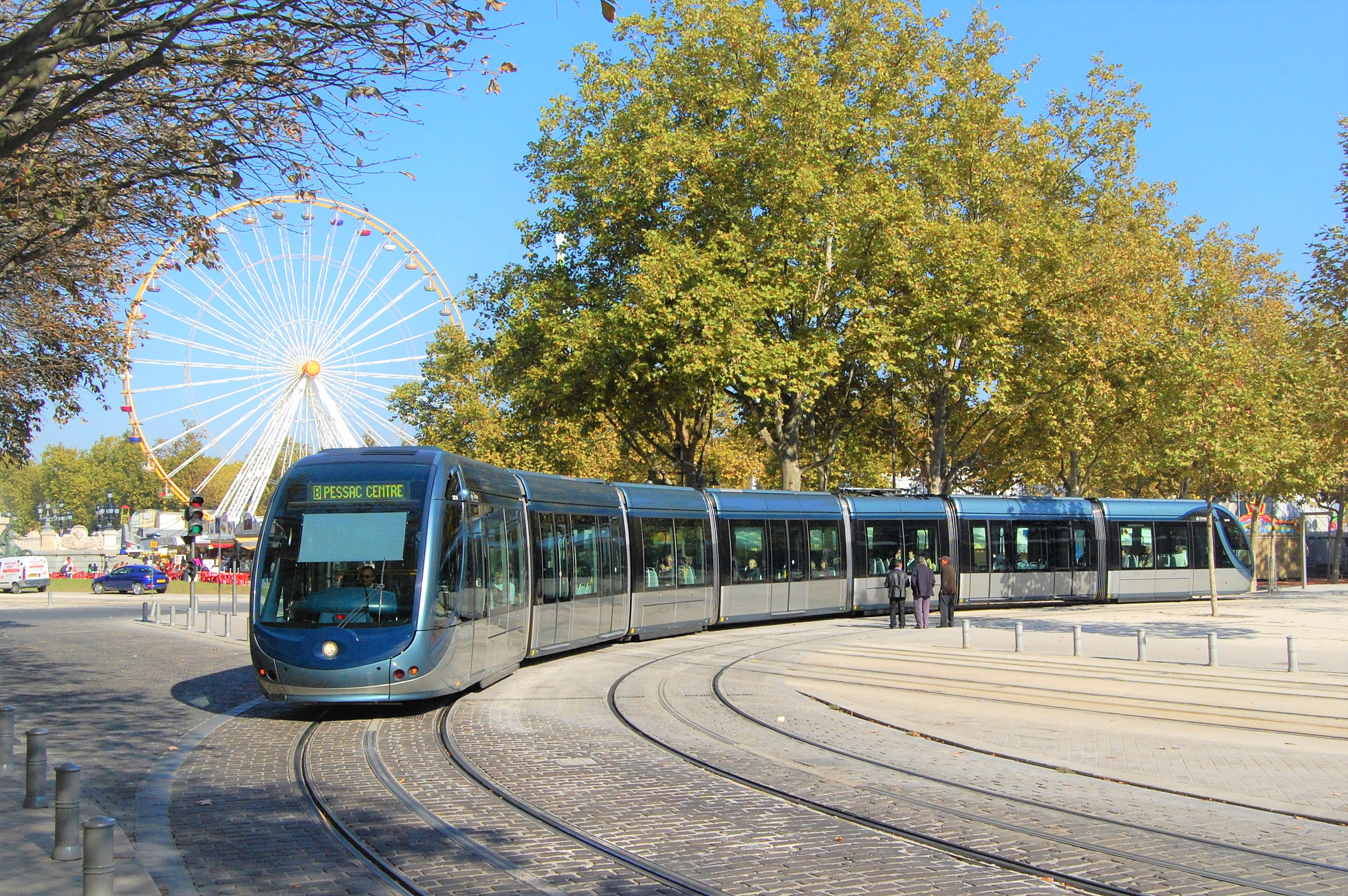
- A TBM Line B tram torwards Pessac Centre running on the Place des Quinconces

Overview
- Native name: Tramway de Bordeaux
- Locale: Bordeaux, Nouvelle-Aquitaine, France
- Transit type: Light rail/tram
- Number of lines: 6
- Number of stations: 130
- Annual ridership: 96.77 million (2018)
- Website: InfoTBM

Operation
- Began operation: 2003
- Operator: TBM
- Number of vehicles: 130

Technical
- System length: 77.3 km (48.0 mi).
- Track gauge: 1,435 mm (4 ft 8 1/2 in) standard gauge
- Electrification: 750 V DC from overhead catenary (outside city centre) or APS (city centre)
System map
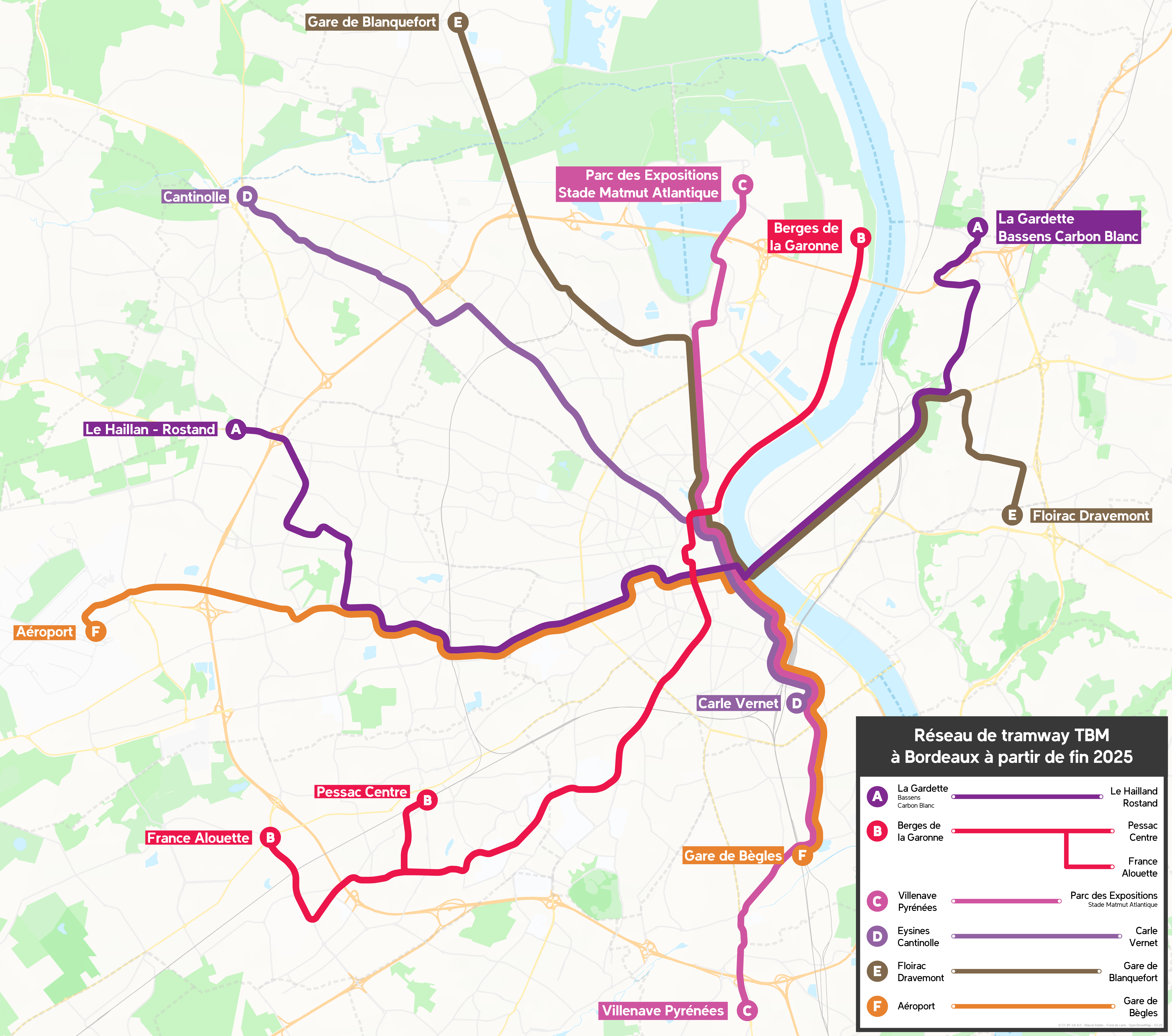

The Bordeaux tramway network (French: Tramway de Bordeaux, pronounced [tʁamwɛ də bɔʁdo]) consists of six lines serving the city of Bordeaux in Nouvelle-Aquitaine in southwestern France. The system has a route length of 82 kilometres (51 mi), serving a total of 133 tram stops.

The first line of Bordeaux's modern tramway opened on 21 December 2003. The system is notable for using the Alstom APS ground-level power supply system in the city centre. It has been operated by Keolis since 1 May 2009.

== History ==
=== Original tramway ===
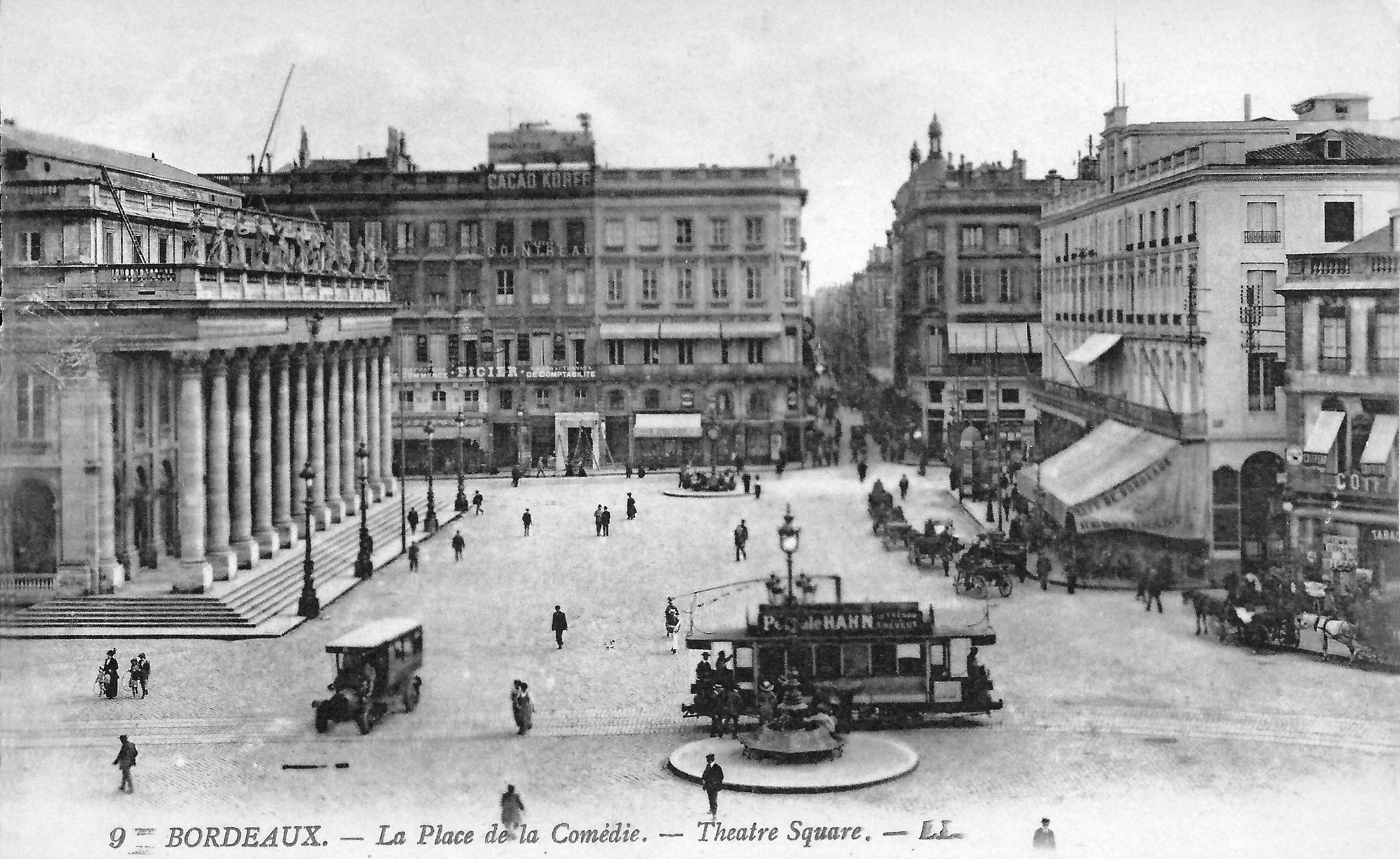
Tramway at place de la Comédie in the 1900s

First World War: while the men are at the front, women drive the tram in Bordeaux, 1916

The first public transport service in Bordeaux was a horse-drawn omnibus, introduced in 1830. In 1880, the first horse-drawn tramway was introduced, and eventually 752 horses were used to pull 71 cars. The horse-drawn tramway was limited to the city of Bordeaux and, as a consequence, the first electric tramway was introduced in the neighbouring suburbs in 1890. The city's horse-drawn trams were replaced by electric trams in 1900.

In 1920, the various tramways were unified, allowing expansion of the system. By 1946, the public transportation system in Bordeaux had 38 tram lines with a total length of 200 kilometres (120 mi), carrying 160,000 passengers per day. A rudimentary system of ground-level power supply was used on some stretches with mixed success.

As in other French cities at the time the mayor, Jacques Chaban-Delmas (first elected in 1947), embraced anti-tram arguments and decided to terminate the operation of the tramway. He found the tramway to be old-fashioned compared to the bus and its attachment to set tracks on the ground hindered the increasing flow of cars. In 1958 the last line of tramway was closed.

=== Without a tramway ===
By the 1970s the failure of the "all car" transport policy had become obvious, but Chaban was not prepared to backtrack. A grandiose automated underground railway scheme using the Véhicule Automatique Léger (VAL) system was promoted; it even received the backing of a majority of the city's councillors, but fell victim in the end not just to the fierce opposition of the local transport users' association TRANSCUB but to the hard reality of the fine sandy nature of the city's soil. The VAL idea was dropped. Chaban remained.

Bordeaux had to wait until 1995 and the election of Alain Juppé as mayor – as well as the total strangulation of the city by its transport problems – before the situation was tackled. Following two years of studies, the Bordeaux Urban Community adopted the tramway plan in 1997. Recognized by the central government in 2000 as a Public Interest Project, the scheme got under way.

=== The new tramway - phase 1 ===
Construction of the new tramway started in February 2000, with preliminary works for the tramway. In May 2000 a contract was signed with Alstom for the supply of the tram fleet, and in October the first track was laid. Construction and testing continued through 2001 to 2003, and the first section of the tramway opened on 21 December 2003 in the presence of President Jacques Chirac, and the mayor of Bordeaux, Alain Juppé. The newly open section, known as line A, ran from Lormont-Lauriers and La Morlette, to Mériadeck.

The opening of the first section of line A was followed by that of lines B and C, on 24 April 2004. At that stage line B ran from Quinconces to Saint-Nicolas, whilst line C whilst line C ran from Quinconces to Gare St-Jean. On 3 July 2004, line B was extended from Saint-Nicolas to Bougnard. In September 2005, line A was extended from Mériadeck to Saint-Augustin.

With the extension of line A to Saint-Augustin, the first phase of the new Bordeaux Tramway was complete. The system was 24.3 kilometres (15.1 mi) in length, served 53 tram stops, and cost 690 million euros to build.

=== The new tramway - phase 2 ===
Preparatory work for a second phase of the tramway started in 2004, with construction work starting in October 2005. Phase 2 consisted of a series of incremental extensions to the existing three lines, opening throughout 2007 and 2008:

- On 27 February 2007, line A was extended from La Morlette to Floirac Dravemont.
- On 29 May 2007, line B was extended from Bougnard to Pessac Centre.
- On 21 June 2007, line A was extended from Saint-Augustin to Mérignac Centre.
- On 27 July 2007, line B was extended from Quinconces to Bassins à Flot.
- On 19 November 2007, line C was extended from Quinconces to Grand-Parc.
- On 27 February 2008, line C was extended from Grand-Parc to Les Aubiers and from Gare Saint-Jean to Terres Neuves.
- On 31 June 2008, line A was extended from Lormont-Lauriers to La Gardette - Bassens - Carbon Blanc.
- On 20 October 2008, line B was extended from Bassins à Flot to Claveau.

When completed, phase 2 added 36 new stations and 19.6 kilometres (12.2 mi) of additional tracks to the tramway system.

=== The new tramway - phase 3 ===
Planning and consultation for phase 3 of the tramway started in 2008. The déclaration d'utilité publique for the extensions of lines A, B and C was signed by the prefect on 24 December 2010, followed by that for the new line D on 30 November 2011. Preparatory work for the extensions of lines A, B and C started in early 2011, whilst the first preparatory work on line D started in August 2013 with an archaeological survey. There were some legal delays, with the déclaration d'utilité publique for line D and the extension of line C to Gare de Blanquefort tram stop being cancelled by the Bordeaux Administrative Tribunal on 23 October 2014 before being reinstated by the Administrative Court of Appeal of Bordeaux on 21 July 2015.

The extension to the existing lines eventually opened as follows:

- On 1 February 2014, line C was extended from Les Aubiers to Berges du Lac.
- On 20 June 2014, line B was extended from Claveau to Berges de la Garonne.
- On 24 January 2015, line C was extended from Berges du Lac to Parc des Expositions.
- On 24 January 2015, line A was extended from Mérignac Centre to Le Haillan-Rostand.
- In March 2015, line C was extended from Terres Neuves to Lycée Vaclav Havel.
- In April 2015, a new branch of line B was opened from Bougnard to France Alouette.
- On 17 December 2016, a new branch of line C was opened from Cracovie to Gare de Blanquefort.
- On 2 February 2019, line C was extended from Lycée Vaclav Havel to Villenave Pyrénées.

The new Line D tramway opened in two phases, on 14 December 2019 and 29 February 2020. This new 9.8 kilometres (6.1 mi) line runs from Carle Vernet northwest from Bordeaux through Le Bouscat, Bruges and Eysines, ending at Eysines Cantinolle. The first 4 kilometres (2.5 mi) from Carle Vernet to Quinconces shares tracks with line C, the only part of the Bordeaux tram system where two lines share tracks. Construction of the new line starting in 2017.

In May 2016, the stop Bassins à Flot on line B was renamed to La Cité du Vin, to coincide with the opening of the adjacent Cité du Vin wine museum and tourist attraction.

On 29 Apeil 2023, the network was extended by five kilometres from Quatre Chemins to Bordeaux-Merignac Airport.

== Network ==
The network consists of four lines, with a total route length of 77.5 kilometres (48.2 mi). The routes serve a total of 130 tram stops, counting the nine stops on the section of track shared by lines C and D, and the three interchange points in the city centre (Hotel de Ville, Porte de Bourgogne and Quinconces) once only.

Lignes du réseau de tramway de Bordeaux en décembre 2025
Line	Route	Length	Stations
Bordeaux Tramway Line A	Le Haillan Rostand ↔ La Gardette Bassens Carbon-Blanc	28.9 km (18.0 mi)	40
Bordeaux Tramway Line B	Berges de la Garonne ↔ Pessac France Alouette / Pessac Centre	19.5 km (12.1 mi)	37
Bordeaux Tramway Line C	Parc des Expositions ↔ Villenave Pyrénées	19.4 km (12.1 mi)	30
Bordeaux Tramway Line D	Eysines Cantinolle ↔ Carle Vernet	13.8 km (8.6 mi)	24
Bordeaux Tramway Line E	Gare de Blanquefort ↔ Floirac Dravemont	19.3 km (12.0 mi)	29
Bordeaux Tramway Line F	Aéroport ↔ Gare de Bègles	18.0 km (11.2 mi)	34

=== Line A ===
Map of line A of the Bordeaux tramway

Line A of the Bordeaux tramway starts from Le Haillan Rostand in the western suburbs of Bordeaux or from the Bordeaux airport, the first common stop is Quatre Chemins in Mérignac. Then, it runs in an easterly direction towards the city centre, where it crosses and has an interchange with line B at Hôtel de Ville, and with lines C and D at Porte de Bourgogne. It then crosses the Garonne river on the Pont de pierre bridge and runs east to Buttinière. Here the line divides into two branches again, one running north-east to La Gardette Bassens Carbon-Blanc and the other south-east to Floirac Dravemont.

The line is 29.2 km (18.1 mi) in length and serves 51 tram stops. The line is double track throughout, with the exception of the approach to and terminal platform at Le Haillan Rostand and Mérignac-Aéroport, which takes the form of a single-track stub.

For most of the day on Mondays to Fridays, trams run at least every five minutes between Pin Galant and Buttinière, with services every ten minutes on the branches and outer sections. Services run less frequently in the early morning, late evenings, weekends and public holidays.

=== Line B ===
Line B of the Bordeaux tramway starts at Berges de la Garonne in the north of Bordeaux and runs in a southerly direction towards the city centre, running parallel to the left bank of the Garonne river. An intermediate terminus is passed at Claveau, where some trams from the south terminate. In the city centre it crosses and has an interchange with lines C and D at Quinconces and with line A at Hôtel de Ville. It then runs south-west to Bougnard. Here the line divides into two branches, one running north to Pessac Centre and the other west to France Alouette.

The line is 19.5 km (12.1 mi) in length and serves 37 tram stops. The line is double track between La Cité du Vin and Bougnard, but includes significant stretches of bi-directional single track in its branches and outer sections. Just north of La Cité du Vin the line crosses over the entrance lock to the Bassins à flot, with trams normally using a route over a swing bridge at the downstream end of the lock, but with an alternative route available via the other end of the lock if the main bridge is swung open.

For most of the day on Mondays to Fridays, trams run at least every five minutes between Claveau and Bougnard, with services every ten minutes on the branches and outer sections. Services run less frequently in the early morning, late evenings, weekends and public holidays.

=== Line C ===
Line C of the Bordeaux tramway commences with two branches to the north of Bordeaux. One branch starts at Parc des Expositions and runs south to Cracovie. The other branch starts at Gare de Blanquefort and runs alongside the SNCF line to Pointe-de-Grave as far as Ausone, from where it follows a disused railway line to Cracovie. From here the combined line runs south to the city centre. In the city centre it joins and shares tracks with line D at Quinconces, where it also has an interchange with B. Lines C and D continue to run south together, and share an interchange with line A at Porte de Bourgogne and with the city's main railway station at Gare Saint-Jean. At Carle Vernet, line D terminates, leaving line C to continue by itself. An intermediate terminus is passed at Gare de Bègles, where some trams from the north terminate, before the final terminus is reached at Villenave Pyrénées.

The line is 19.4 km (12.1 mi) in length and serves 35 tram stops. The line is double track between Cracovie and Gare de Bègles, but includes significant stretches of bi-directional single track in its branches and outer sections. In particular the section alongside the line to Pointe-de-Grave is single-track sharing the same right of way as the (also single-track) main line railway. This section is sometimes called the Tram train du Médoc, although strictly speaking it does not meet the normal definition of a tram-train as the tram and train do not share track.

For most of the day on Mondays to Fridays, trams run at least every five minutes between Cracovie and Gare de Bègles, with services every ten minutes on the branches and outer sections. Services run less frequently in the early morning, late evenings, weekends and public holidays.

=== Line D ===
Line D of the Bordeaux tramway starts at Eysines Cantinolle to the north-west of Bordeaux and runs in a south-easterly direction towards the city centre. An intermediate terminus is passed at Hippodrome, where some trams from the south terminate. In the city centre it joins and shares tracks with line C at Quinconces, where it also has an interchange with B. Lines C and D continue to run south together, and share an interchange with line A at Porte de Bourgogne and with the city's main railway station at Gare Saint-Jean. The line terminates at Carle Vernet, leaving line C to continue by itself.

The line is 9.8 km (6.1 mi) in length and serves 24 tram stops. The line is double track between Hippodrome and Carle Vernet, but includes significant stretches of bi-directional single track between Eysines Cantinolle and Hippodrome.

For most of the day on Mondays to Fridays, trams run at least every eight minutes between Hippodrome and Carle Vernet, with services every fifteen minutes beyond Hippodrome. Services run less frequently in the early morning, late evenings, weekends and public holidays.

== Operations ==
A particular feature of the new Bordeaux tram network is its ground-level power supply system which is used in the city centre to avoid overhead wires spoiling the view of buildings. This was the source of many difficulties and breakdowns when first introduced. Improvements since then, however, have increased reliability and the network is now one of Bordeaux's principal plus points, valued not just for enabling the people of the city to get about easily but also for its contribution to the aesthetics of the city and its quality of life. The new trams are an essential part of Bordeaux's current tourist redynamization strategy. The three lines were extended in 2007 and 2008 to reach several housing estates as well as the suburb of Mérignac. The whole system is under video surveillance, with a camera installed inside each vehicle.

=== Hours of operation and headways ===
Trams operate on all lines from around 4.30am until midnight, seven days a week with later service on Thursdays, Fridays and Saturdays until around 1.30am. All stops have panels showing the waiting time until the next tram. On Sunday and holiday mornings, trams run every 30/40 minutes until around 1000am then every 20 minutes. Weekday and Saturday services operate every 10 – 12 minutes with additional service during 'rush hour' and for special events. However, there is no service at all on May 1, Labour Day holiday.

=== Fares and ticketing ===
Tickets are sold at ticket machines, newsagents, and on the TBM app, and are priced at:

- €1.90 for a single ticket
- €3.40 for two tickets, usable for a return journey
- €15.70 for ten tickets

Each ticket is valid for an hour's travel, and the two- and ten-journey options may be shared between multiple passengers travelling together.

Tickets for unlimited travel include:

- €3.50 evening pass from 7pm to 7am
- €6.50/€11/€13.50 for 24/48/72 hours
- €17.50 for a calendar week

City Passes including access to tourist attractions as well as travel are also available.

=== Traffic ===
In 2018, the tram system carried 96.77 million passengers.

=== Electric power - ground-level power supply ===
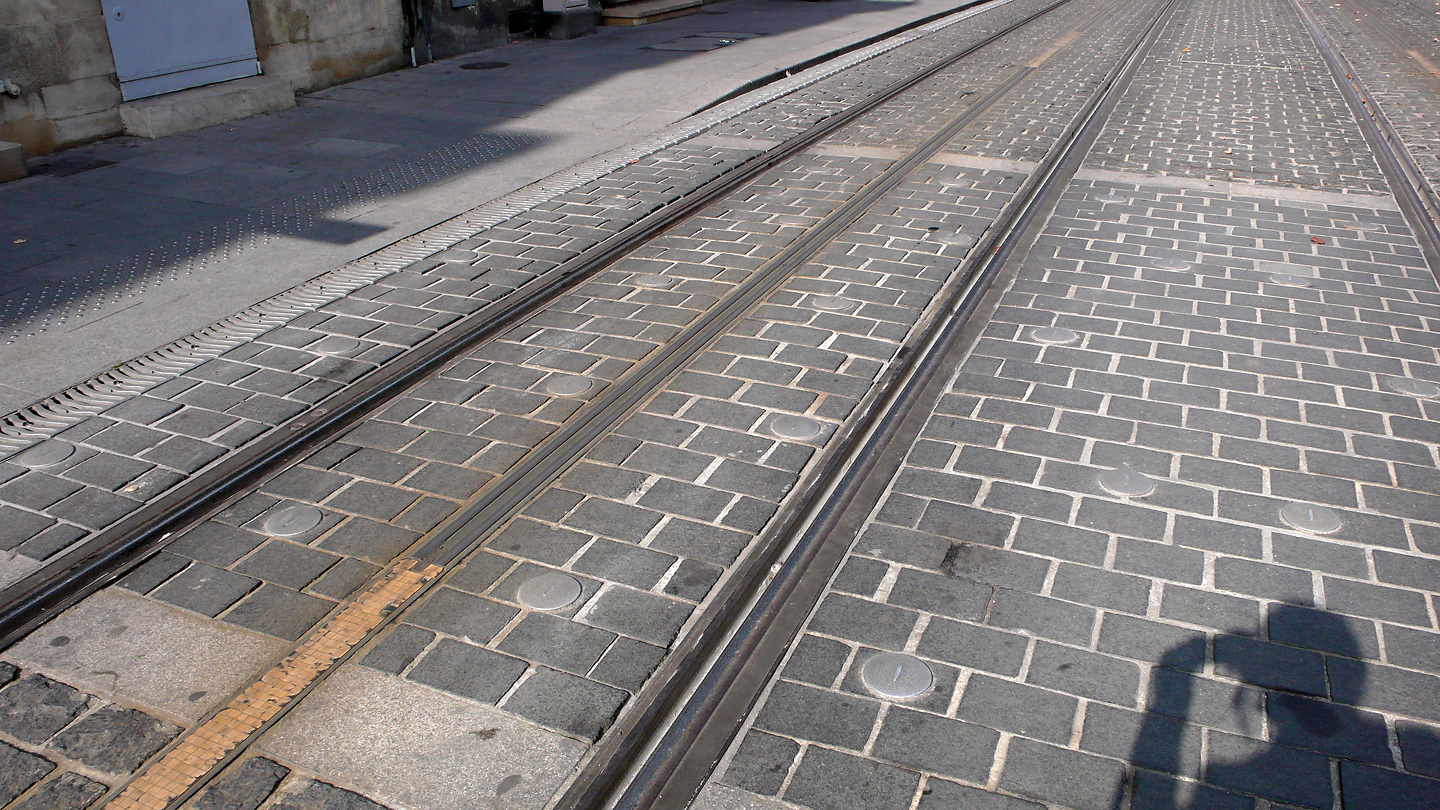
Central rail of the APS system

By demand of the Municipality of Bordeaux (CUB), part of the system uses the Alstom APS system of ground-level power supply. There is no overhead wire, and electric power to the tram is supplied by a segmented center rail. Only the segment directly under the tram is electrically live. The French government reports no electrocutions or electrification accidents on any tramway in France from as early as 2003 until as recently as December 31, 2022.

=== Rolling stock ===
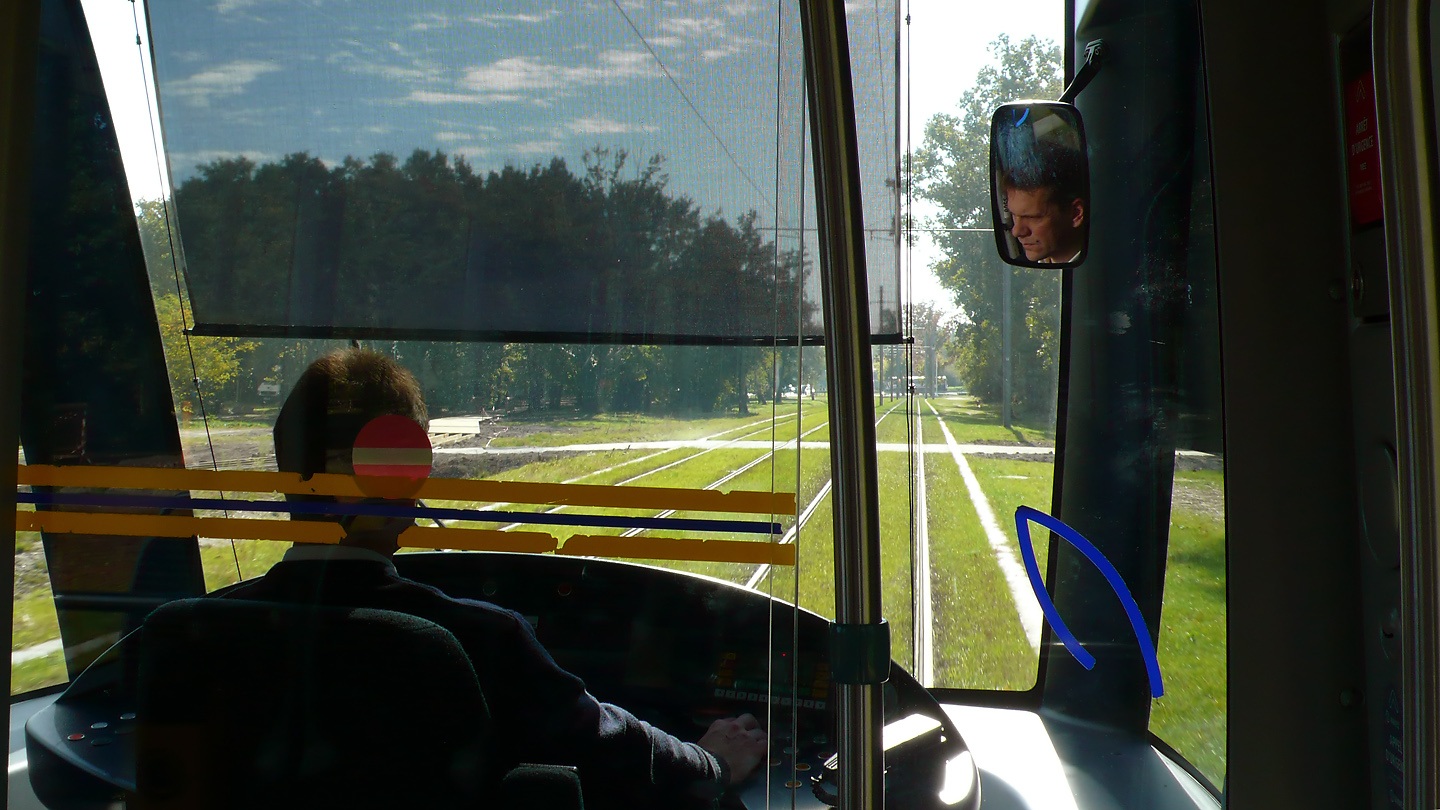
Driver's compartment

As of February 2020, the fleet is composed of 130 Alstom Citadis trams delivered between 2000 and 2020:

- 118 Citadis 402 — length: 43,989 mm (144 ft 3.9 in), width: 2.4 m (7 ft 10 in), weight: 54.92 t (54.05 long tons; 60.54 short tons). 7 segments with 4 bogies and 3 motors and 720 kW (970 hp) power. These trams support up to 300 passengers with 70 seated, and are used on all lines.
- 12 Citadis 302 — length: 32.85 m (107 ft 9 in), width: 2.4 m (7 ft 10 in), weight: 41.34 t (40.69 long tons; 45.57 short tons). 5 segments with 3 bogies and 2 motors and 480 kW (640 hp) power. These trams support up to 218 passengers with 48 seated, and are normally used on line C.

All trams are air conditioned and have a low floor. The rails are 1,435 mm (4 ft 8 1/2 in) standard gauge and power is 750 V DC. The maximum speed is 60 km/h (37 mph) with an acceleration of 1.15 m/s^{2} (3.8 ft/s^{2}). The deceleration obtained from emergency braking is 2.85 m/s^{2} (9.4 ft/s^{2}).

=== Depots ===
There are tram depots at:

- Thiers Benauge, accessed by a 500 metres (1,600 ft) line from near Thiers-Benauge tram stop on line A
- Rue Achard, adjacent to Rue Achard tram stop on line B
- La Jallere, accessed by a 1 kilometre (0.62 mi) line from Parc des Expositions - Stade Matmut-Atlantique tram stop on line C

== See also ==
- Transports Bordeaux Métropole
- Trams in France
- List of town tramway systems in France
