= Elizabeth de Portzamparc =

French-Brazilian architect

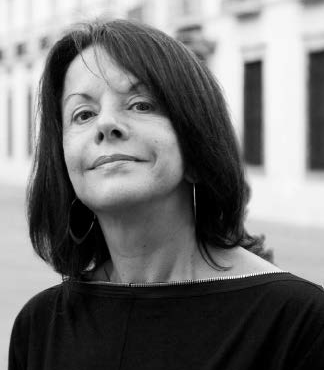
- Born: Elizabeth Jardim Neves; Rio de Janeiro, Brazil
- Occupation: Architect

Elizabeth de Portzamparc is a French-Brazilian architect.

== Biography ==
Born in Rio de Janeiro, de Portzamparc developed an early passion for art. Her father, who was from Belo Horizonte and was passionate about architecture, regularly took her to Pampulha Art Museum and talked to her about the "genius Oscar Niemeyer," who he knew and admired. Motivated by Iberê Camargo, a friend of her parents, Elizabeth started to practice conceptual art in her youth. She studied at the schools Sacred Heart of Jesus, Santa Ursula, and Brasileiro de Almeida. After graduating, de Portzamparc then passed the "vestibular" exams and entered the PUC (Pontifical Catholic University) faculty in Rio, but soon discontinued as she wished to leave the country.

Later on, in France, simultaneously to her studies in anthropology, urban sociology (Paris V), and regional planning (IEDES-Paris I), she dedicated herself exclusively to urban themes. Specifically, she worked on new towns, the work of the Institut d'aménagement et d'urbanisme de la région d'Île-de-France (IAURIF; now the IAU), and particularly the urbanism workshop of the Antony commune. There, in 1977–78, she conducted pioneering studies on the concepts of "neighbourhoods/sub-neighbourhoods", bringing the notions of "local life" and territorial links to the center of the founding principles of territorial planning policies.

In 1980, she became qualified to teach in French architecture schools, and taught in the Ecole Nationale Supérieure d’Architecture of Paris-Val de Seine (UP9) between 1984 and 1988.

De Portzamparc worked on a research project entitled Extension de la Démocratie Locale, published in 1982, for the French Ministry of Environment and Quality of Life. In 1984, she carried an operational research project for the French Ministry of the Equipment, by creating the first inter-communal urbanism structure for the project of the South Paris "Coulée verte". This research was later developed and completed by the IAURIF.

De Portzamparc designed the "24 hours" desk, which was exhibited at the 1985 Decorator Artist's Fair and at the Cartier Foundation during the exhibition called MDF, des créateurs pour un matériau (MDF, creators for a material). The piece was received well, and was then acquired by the Fonds National d'Art Contemporain.

In 1986, she opened and managed the Mostra gallery in Paris. Surrounded by artists, designers and architects such as Jean Nouvel, Rem Koolhaas, Christian de Portzamparc, François Rouan, Pierre Buraglio, Arata Isozaki, Bernar Venet, and Peter Klasen, among others, she questioned the creative approach proper to architects, artists and contemporary furniture designers of that time. Consequently, through themed exhibitions, she developed a profusion of unique ideas showing very clearly the specificities of each creative field, which brought her to the headlines of many French and international magazines and put her gallery on the podium of the best Parisian galleries.

In 1987, she created her own architectural agency, which is since then characterized by many projects touching different levels of development.

== Career ==
In 1989, de Portzamparc won the contest for the design of the Information Center of the French National Assembly. In 1992, she won the contest for the museography project of the Korean National Museum, for which she created a museographic urban path, based on a circuit of interior streets that extend to the exterior public spaces, going through the exhibition rooms.

In 1995, De Portzamparc created the museography for the Museum of Brittany, in Rennes, for which she also designed a library, interior open squares and spaces for children. De Portzamparc stated that this work was a crystallisation of her style, and that she acquired inspiration from urban morphology to create interior "urban spaces" that hosted the different historical cycles. The scenography of the first sequences were installed in spaces that are reminiscent of buildings and public squares, the following ones were organised in spaces laid out like a street, and the exhibits of the two world wars were presented in a tunnel, symbolising the darkness of this period of history. The ongoing contemporary time was installed in an open, interactive and scalable forum.

In 1997, De Portzamparc won a contest to design the stations and furniture of the Bordeaux metropolitan tramway network. She created the stations as public squares in the city based on the ideas of transparency, lighting, and velocity, aiming to create a metropolitan identity.

Her other projects have included the Musée de la Romanité de Nîmes, the Grand Documentary Equipment of the Condorcet Campus in Aubervilliers and the Le Bourget railway station of Le Bourget.

== Study and research themes ==
De Portzamparc currently carries out her research at the Atelier International du Grand Paris, researching about the identity of places, the local life and the territorial links, fundamental contributions to the reflections on the construction of cities. In this same context, she has made various propositions for sustainable, flexible, mixed-use and prefabricated housing, with low costs and quick construction time. De Portzamparc has been working since 2004 on designing housing for homeless and vulnerable individuals in need of accommodation.

== Major projects - architecture and urbanism ==
=== Architecture ===
- Oasis bioclimatic tower, Rabat – 230 m high - Contest (2015)
- Anfa hotel, Casablanca - 23 000 sqm - Contest (2015- 2018)
- Grand Documentary Equipment of the Condorcet Campus, Aubervilliers, France - Contest, winning project (2014-2019)
- Le Bourget railway station, France: Line 16 of the parisian metro - Contest, winning project (2014-2022)
- Musée de la Romanité of Nîmes, France: architecture and museography - Contest, winning project (2012-2017)
- Housing in Versailles-Chantiers, France: construction of housing buildings - Commission (2012- ongoing study)
- Tower of La Noue: High Rise Tower for mixed use in Bagnolet, Île-de-France, France
- 4-star hotel tower: mixed-use building for hotel and housing, Casablanca, Maroc (2009-)
- French Cultural Center in Florianopolis (theater, media library, restaurant) for the French Alliance, Brazil - Contest, winning project (2009-)
- Bassins à Flot: buildings for housing in accession to ownership and social housing (with commerces, parking lots - 10,000 sqm) in Bordeaux, France (2009-2016)
- Riocentro exhibition center, Rio de Janeiro, Brazil - Contest, winning project (2007-2014)

=== Urbanism ===
- Restructuration of the neighborhood of Pointe de Trivaux in Meudon-la-Forêt, France – Construction of collective housing, commerces and collective services – Contests (2015)
- Project for the creation of an eco-neighborhood in Châtenay-Malabry, France – Contest (2013-)
- New city center of Massy (Île-de-France), France: construction of housing buildings for mixed-use - Contest, winning project (2011-2017)
- Bordeaux Tramway: 145 stations and their urban furniture - Contest, winning project (1997-2013)

=== Regional and coastal planning ===
- Qinhuangdao peninsula, China: Urbanism of the peninsula for a new urban pole in Qinhuangdao: creation of docks and promenades near the shore; housing, commerces, equipments, green areas – Commission (2013- project on hold)
- EuroCalais, France – planning for the littoral zone between Calais and Wissant: restructuration of the nautical base and of the channel linked to Calais; extension of the pond of Saint Roch; housing and diverse equipments – (2011)
- Dolphin's resort, Natal, Brazil – conception of the master plan on an eco-resort; conception and construction of a mobile bridge over the river Santo Alberto – Commission (2009)
- Territorial development of Mahdia's coast, Tunisia – creation of an island, a harbour and coastal urbanism and renovation of attached neighborhoods (2008- projet abandonné)
- Buljarica Coastal Development, Buljarica, Montenegro – Sustainable planning of Buljarica's littoral: creation of a marina, a seaside station, hotels SPA, renovation of the existing village, creation of an autonomous city; creation of an international Environment Researches Center (2007- project on hold)
- Offshore extension in Monaco: conception of an eco-territory on the sea; creation of sea fortifications with 4 km promenade along the seafront; conception of the urbanism and architecture of the harbour, artificial beaches, hotel and housing buildings – Contest (2007- abandoned project)

=== Museography ===
- Musée de la Romanité of Nîmes, France – Contest, winning project (2012-2017)
- Jean Cocteau Museum, Menton, France – Contest, winning project (abandoned project)
- Museum of Brittany, Rennes, France – Contest, winning project (1995-2006)
- Nelson-Atkins Museum of Art, Kansas City, USA (2002)
- National Museum of Korea, Seoul - Contest, winning project (1992- abandoned project)

=== Interior design ===
- Headquarters of the Banque Fédérale des Banques Populaires Group, Paris, France – Contest, winning project (2003)
- Headquarters of the Journal Le Monde, Paris, France – Commission (2003)
- Les Grandes Marches restaurant, Paris, France – Commission (2000)
- Canal+ Headquarters, Issy-les-Moulineaux, France – Commission (1998)
- French Embassy in Berlin, Germany – Contest, winning project (1996)
- Café de la Musique restaurant, Paris, France – Commande (1994)

=== Design ===
- "Volux" luminaire edited by Radian (2004)
- Urban luminaires "Hestia" and "Moon Torch" edited by Comatelec (2002)
- "Opéra" chair edited by Poltrona Frau (2000)
- "Zache 2" et "Zache 2 osier" armchairs edited by Bonacina (2000)
- "Dune" chairs edited by Quinette Gallay (1999)
- "Jazz" coat hangers (1989), acquired by the Fonds National d’Art Contemporain
- "24 hours" desk (1988), acquired by the Fonds National d’Art Contemporain

=== Operational research (4 phases) ===
- Revolution Precrafted Home: Home Pavilion project, prefabricated houses designed by renown architects, designers and artists (2015)
- Exhibition Casa Cidade Mundo in Rio de Janeiro, Brazil: sketches of the concept of prefabricated houses that respect the nature and the identity of the cities (2015)
- Study for prefabricated housing for the Grand Paris (2012/2013)
- Project of prefabricated housing for the State of Santa Catarina, Brazil (2009)

== Nominations and distinctions ==
- 2016 - The Musée de la Romanité of Nîmes wins the "Future Heritage Award" in Dubrovnik, Croacia
- 2014 - Medal from the French Senate for her work
- Since 2012 - Member of the Scientific Council of the Atelier International du Grand Paris
- 2005 - Mipim design award for the rehabilitation of the Journal Le Monde, Cannes
- 2002 - "Lighting Design Award" for the urban luminaire HESTIA, London
- 2002 - International Prize, category "hotels" for the Brasserie "Les Grandes Marches", Contract World Award, Hanover
- 1999 - International Prize for Interior Design and Architecture, Fondation Candido Mendes, bestowed by Sergio Bernardes, Rio de Janeiro

== Main events ==
- 4th Biennial of Architecture and Urbanism of Caen, (Re)Construire la ville sur-mesure: lecture on the theme "Fabriquer un tissu urbain contemporain", October 8, 2016
- Symposium (Re)Créer le monde: lecture on the theme "Architecture et visions du monde: la renaissance de l'architecture et de notre civilisation?", May 20, 2016 at the Philharmonie de Paris
- Participation in the exhibition "Les passagers du Grand Paris Express", from March 11 to May 22, 2016, in Boulogne-Billancourt
- Participation in the exhibition Casa Cidade Mundo, from October 3 to November 14, 2015, in Rio de Janeiro
- Conference in the Rio Academy International Forum on the theme "Urbanisme et mobilité", July 21, 2015 in Rio de Janeiro
- Conference in the Centre Pierres Vives on the theme "Identité urbaine: le local et le global", February 6, 2014 in Montpellier
- Participation in the roundtable on the theme "Architecture & Cinéma" in the 2nd edition of the Festival Cinecoa, September 29, 2012, in Vila Nova de Foz Côa, Portugal
- Participation in the exhibition "MDF, des créateurs pour un matériau", from April 24 to May 22, 1988, at the Fondation Cartier for Contemporary Art, Paris

== Main publications ==
- Participation in the catalogue of the Biennial of Architecture and Urbanism of Caen, 2016
- Participation in the catalogue of the exhibition "Une brève histoire de l’avenir" in the Louvre Museum, from September 24, 2015, to January 4, 2016
- Participation in the book "Cher Corbu…", tribute to Le Corbusier at the time of the 50th anniversary of his death, January 2015
- Participation in the number 3 of the magazine Stream on the theme "Issues of the local in the age of global urbanisation", November 2014
- Participation to the special édition of the magazine L’Architecture Aujourd’hui in tribute tu Oscar Niemeyer – Paroles d’Architectes (page 23), 2013
- Book about the Museum of Brittany (museography), 2006
- Research for the Ministry of Environment and Quality of life: "Extension of the local democracy, new social actors and information strategies", 1982
- Implementation of the study "The neighborhoods of Antony: urban and socio-economic analysis and diagnose of the city", 1980
- Implementation of the "Reference plan of Antony" with Georges Douarre: proposition of urban plannings (traffic plans, urban equipments and housing), 1980
- Research for the Public Institution of the New City of Saint-Quentin en Yvelines: the neighborhood of Elancourt-Maurepas. From the urban planner's new city to the city of the inhabitants. With Marie-Odile Terrenoire, 1975
