= Parc des Expositions – Stade Matmut-Atlantique tram stop =

Tram station in Bordeaux, France

Parc des Expositions – Stade Matmut-Atlantique
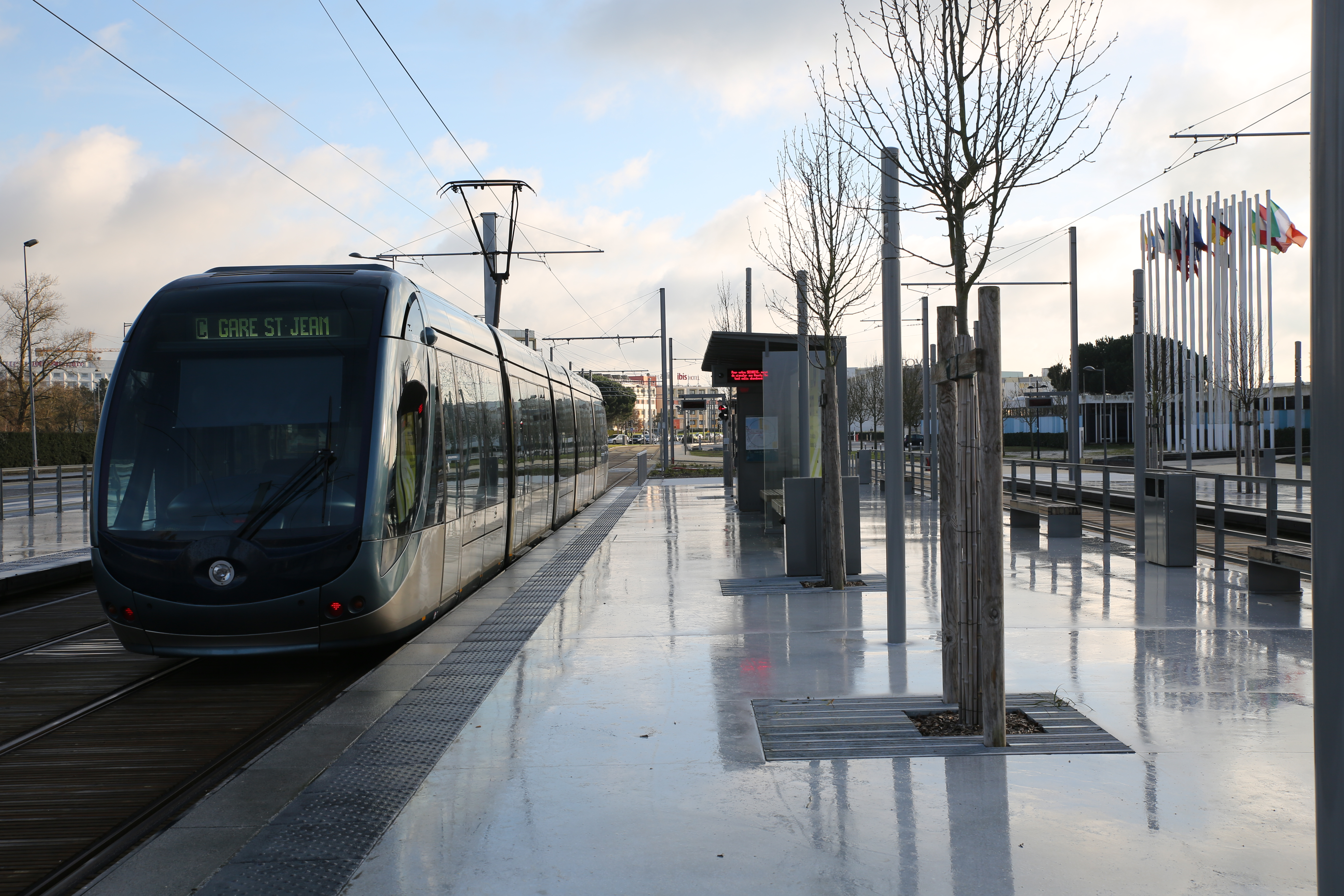

General information
- Location: Bordeaux; France
- Coordinates: 44°53′36″N 0°33′57″W
- Line: Line C

History
- Opened: 24 January 2015

Services
Preceding station	Bordeaux tramway	Following station
Terminus	Line C	Palais des congrès towards Villenave Pyrénées
Location
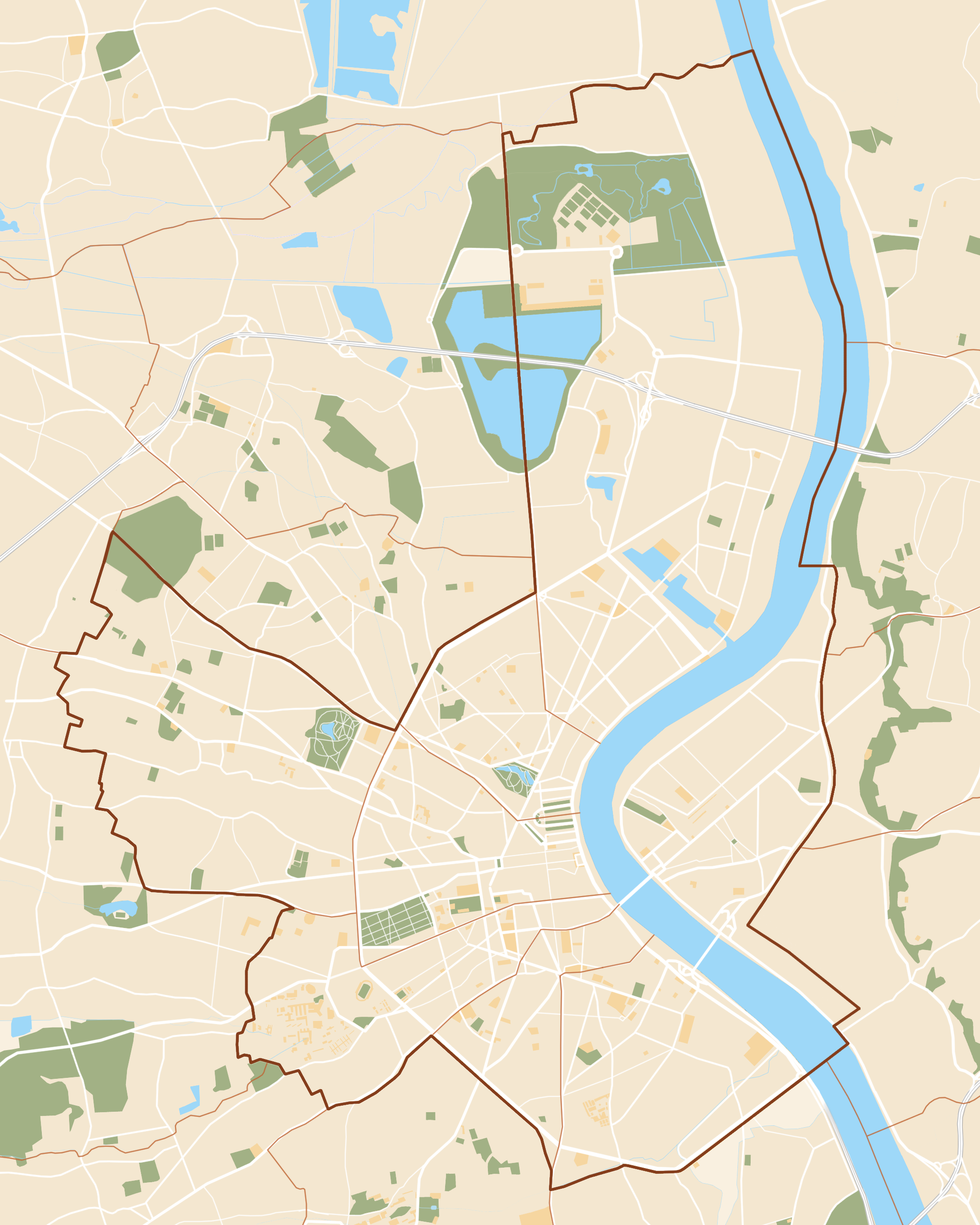
- Location within Bordeaux Location within Nouvelle-Aquitaine Location within France

Parc des Expositions – Stade Matmut-Atlantique tram stop is a tram stop on line C of the Tramway de Bordeaux. It is located on Cours Charles Bricaud in the north of the city of Bordeaux. The stop opened on 24 January 2015, when Line C was extended north from Berges du Lac, and it is the current northern terminus of one of the two branches of line C. The stop is operated by Transports Bordeaux Métropole.

For most of the day on Mondays to Fridays, trams run at least every ten minutes. Services run less frequently in the early morning, late evenings, weekends and public holidays.

The stop has three tracks and three platforms. Although it is the terminus of passenger service on line C, the track continues for some 1 kilometre (0.62 mi) beyond the stop, to the tram depot at La Jallere.
