= Transports Bordeaux Métropole =

Public transport network in Bordeaux, France

Transports Bordeaux Métropole (French pronunciation: [tʁɑ̃spɔʁ bɔʁdo metʁɔpɔl], TBM; formerly Tram et bus de la CUB, or TBC) is a public transport system for the 28 communes of Bordeaux Métropole. It also provides service to part of the commune of Cadaujac.

The TBC had replaced the CGFTE (Compagnie générale française des transports et entreprises) on 3 July 2004 after the completion of the three TBC tramway lines and partial reorganization of the network.
