= Patrice Brun =

Patrice Brun may refer to:

- Patrice Brun (archaeologist) (born 1951), French archaeologist
- Patrice Brun (historian) (born 1953), French historian
