= Tanguy Pastureau =

French radio and television comedian

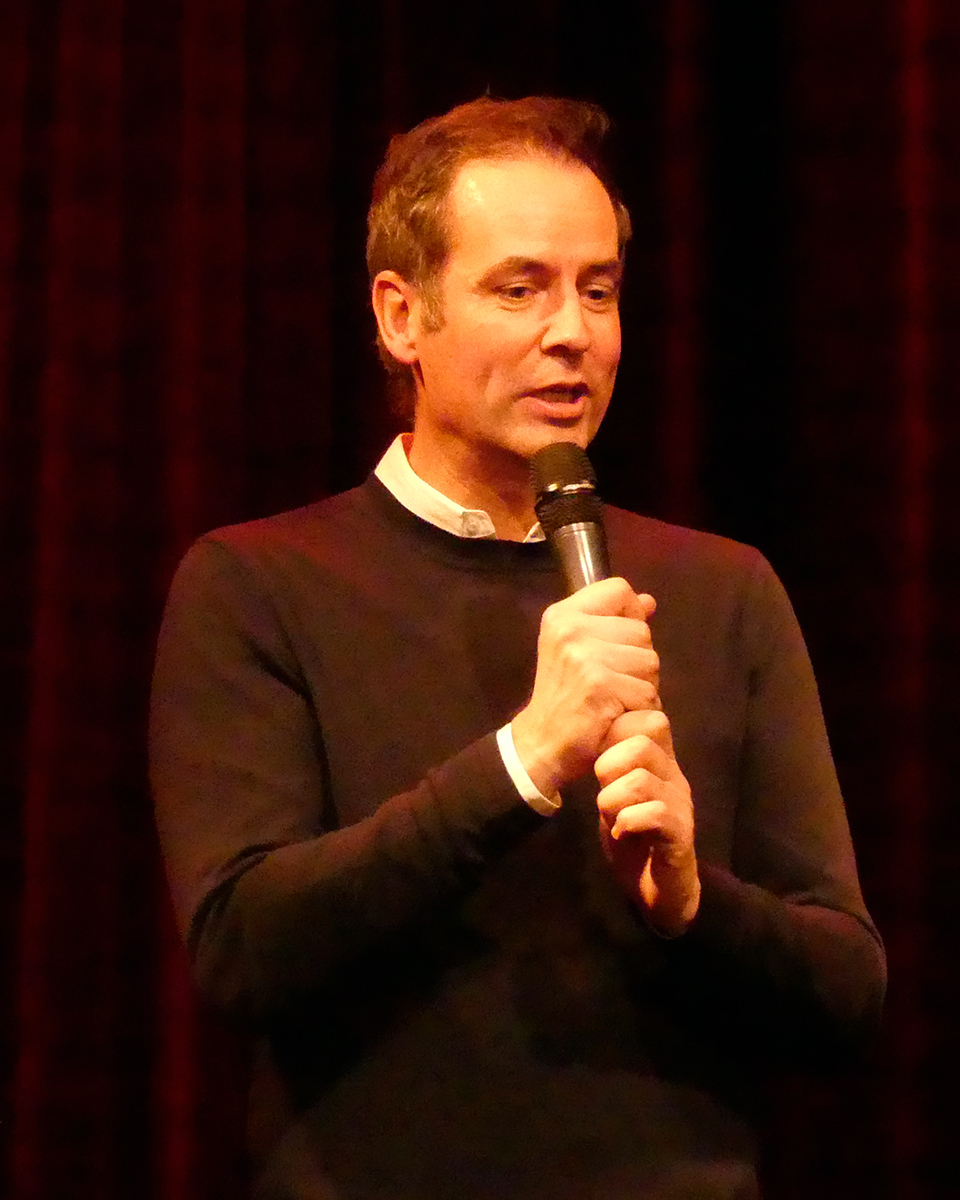
Tanguy Pastureau, 2024.

Tanguy Pastureau (born 26 January 1974 in Pessac) is a French radio and television comedian.
