= Hôtel de Ville, Pessac =

Town hall in Pessac, France

Hôtel de Ville
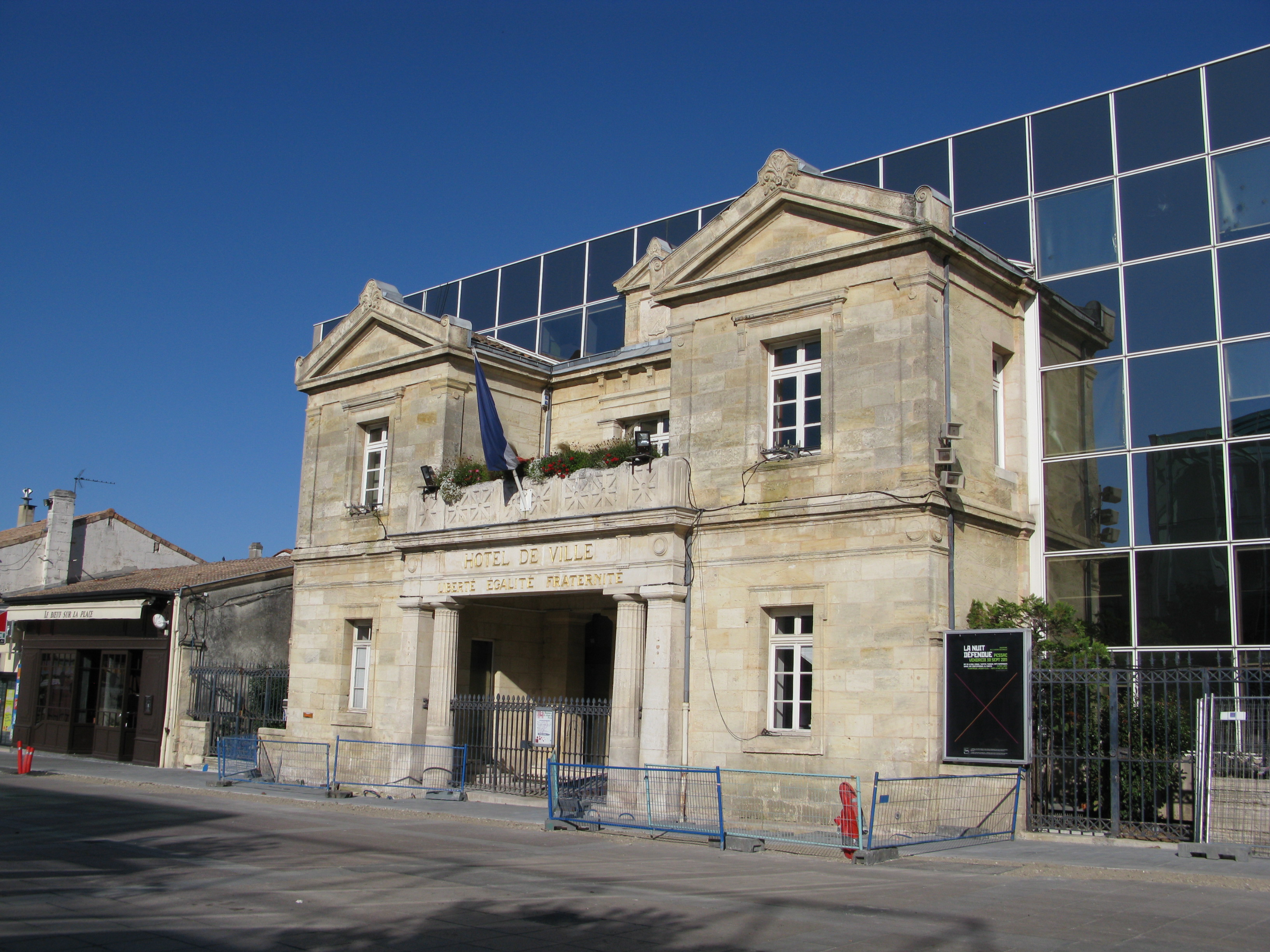
- The main frontage of the Hôtel de Ville in October 2011
- Interactive map of the Hôtel de Ville area

General information
- Type: City hall
- Architectural style: Neoclassical style
- Location: Pessac, France
- Coordinates: 44.8058°N 0.6306°W
- Completed: 1868

The Hôtel de Ville (French pronunciation: [otɛl də vil], City Hall) is a municipal building in Pessac, Gironde, in southwestern France, standing on Place de la Vème République.

== History ==
Following the French Revolution, the town council established its first town hall at the corner of the corner of Avenue du Pont de Chiquet and Avenue Jean-Jaurès. However, in the mid-19th century, the council decided to commission a more substantial building. The site they selected was on the east side of the central square (now known as Place de la Vème République) to the north of the Church of Saint Martin. The new building was designed in the neoclassical style, built in ashlar stone and was completed in 1868. The design involved a symmetrical main frontage of three bays facing onto the square, with the end bays projected forward as pavilions. The central bay featured a portico formed by two pairs of Doric order columns supporting an entablature and a balcony. There was a French door with a moulded surround on the first floor and, above the central bay, there was a panel containing a coat of arms flanked by pilasters supporting a triangular pediment. The coat of arms was surmounted by a crown in deference to the emperor, Napoleon III. The outer bays were fenestrated by casement windows with moulded surrounds on both floors.

A local merchant, Ferdinand Clouzet, who had served as mayor of Pessac from 1870 to 1878, donated a tree which was planted in the courtyard behind the town hall in 1879. The tree survived until it was cut down in 1935.

A war memorial, designed by Gaston Leroux-Veneuvot, which was intended to commemorate the lives of local service personnel who had died in the First World War, was unveiled in front of the town hall in November 1927. After the Second World War the names of people who had fought for the French Resistance and those who had been transported to their deaths in concentration camps, were added to the memorial.

In the early 1980s, the council decided to expand and extend the town hall to the rear. While the construction work was ongoing the council relocated to temporary accommodation at the Heudebert factory, manufacturers of biscottes in the Les Échoppes district of the town. The expansion, which involved embedding the rear of the existing town hall into a large glass structure behind, was carried out in the modern style and was completed in 1988. The works also created a public entrance at the southwest corner of the site, formed by a glass atrium flanked by walls faced with highly polished brown panels. Internally, the principal room was the Salle du Conseil (council chamber).

== Sources ==
- "Pessac Illustré" (PDF). Les Passeurs de Memoire de Pessac. 2022.
