= Patrice Brun (historian) =

French historian (born 1953)

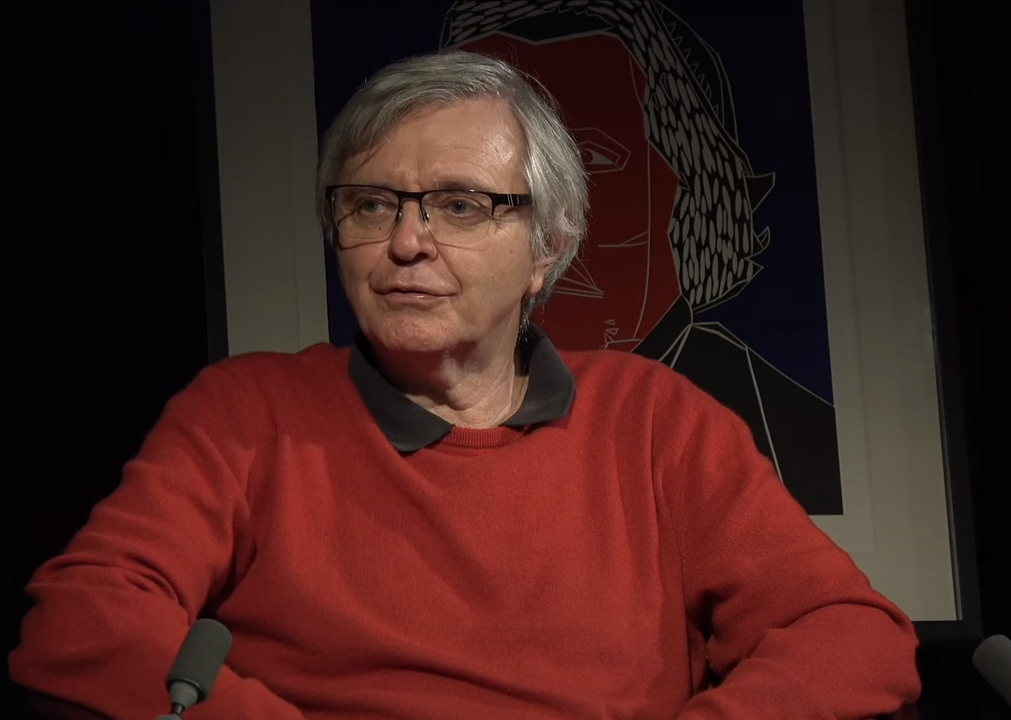
Brun in 2021

Patrice Brun (born 1953, Pessac) is a French historian, a specialist of ancient Greece and epigraphy. His research focuses on the history of classical and Hellenistic Greece. He was president of the Bordeaux Montaigne University between 2009 and 2012.

== Bibliography ==
- 1983: Eisphora, syntaxis, stratiotika : recherches sur les finances militaires d'Athènes au IVe, Belles Lettres/Annales littéraires de l'université de Besançon.
- 1995: Les Archipels égéens, V° - II° siècles av. J.C., Paris, Les Belles Lettres
- 2000: L'orateur Démade. Essai d'histoire et d'historiographie, Bordeaux, Editions Ausonius,
- 2003: Le monde grec à l'époque classique 500-323 a.c, Paris, Armand Colin,
- 2005: Impérialisme et démocratie à Athènes. Inscriptions de l'époque classique, Paris, Armand Colin,
- 2009: La bataille de Marathon, Paris, Éditions Larousse,
- 2014: De la renonciation comme acte politique. Chronique d'une présidence d'université, Bordeaux III, 2009-2012, Le Bord de l'eau,
- 2015: Démosthène; rhétorique, pouvoir et corruption. Paris: Armand Colin. 2015. ISBN 978-2-200-60266-6.
