= Patrice Brun (archaeologist) =

French archaeologist (born 1951)

Patrice Brun (7 July 1951, Koblenz) is a French archaeologist, a professor at Pantheon-Sorbonne University where he teaches European early history as well as theories and methods of archeology.

His main focus encompasses the 6,500-year BCE in Europe, from the advent of the Agro-pastoral economy to the State in a major part of the continent, with an emphasis on recent Protohistory, i.e., Bronze and Iron Ages. He greatly contributed to large-scale data collected from region-level excavation campaigns.

Patrice Brun’s research covers a broad range of aspects present in all Europe, namely trade and exchanges, the settlement patterns, and dynamics of identity. This multivariate and multidisciplinary approach allows shedding the light on Patrice Brun’s main focus: dynamics of social changes that led to the rise of State. His main contributions were on the "Urnfield Culture", the "Hallstatt Princely Phenomenon" in the Celtic territory in the North of the Alps, the origin of the Celts, the social meaning of funerary and non-funerary remains, along with the task specialization and the growing complexity of the european societies.

== Publications ==
- 1986: P. Brun, La Civilisation des Champs d'Urnes : étude critique dans le Bassin Parisien, Documents d'Archéologie Française, 4, Paris, Maison des Sciences de l'Homme,
- 1987: P. Brun, Princes et princesses de la Celtique, le Premier Age du Fer (850-450 av. J.-C.), Paris, Errance,
- 1988: P. Brun, C. Mordant (dir.) Le Groupe Rhin-Suisse-France orientale et la notion de Civilisation des Champs d'Urnes, Actes du Colloque international de Nemours, March 1986, Nemours, A.P.R.A.I.F.,
- 1993: P. Brun, S. Van der Leeuw, C. R. Whittaker (dir.), Frontières d'Empire : Nature et signification des frontières romaines, Actes de la table ronde internationale de Nemours, May 1992, Nemours, A.P.R.A.I.F.,
- 1997: P. Brun, B. Chaume (dir.) Vix et les éphémères principautés celtiques. Les VIe-Ve siècles av. J.-C. en Europe centre-occidentale, Actes du colloque international de Châtillon-sur-Seine, October 1993, Paris, Errance,
- 1998: P. Brun, Fragments d'une protohistoire de la division sociale en Europe, Habilitation à diriger des thèses de l'université de Paris I, multigraphié,
- 2006: P. Brun, C. Marcigny, J. Vanmoerkerke (dir.), Une archéologie des réseaux locaux : quelles surfaces étudier pour quelle représentativité ?, Dossier spécial, Les Nouvelles de l'Archéologie, N° 104-105, Paris, Errance,
- 2006: A. Averbouh, P. Brun, C. Karlin, S. Mery, P. de Miroschedji (dir.), Spécialisation des tâches et sociétés, Techniques & Culture, N° 46-47, Paris, Fondation de la Maison des Sciences de l'Homme,
- 2007: L. Baray, P. Brun, A. Testart (dir.), Pratiques funéraires et sociétés, Actes du colloque international de Sens, juin 2003, Dijon, Presses universitaires de Dijon,
- 2008: P. Brun, P. Ruby, L'âge du Fer en France. Premières villes, premiers États celtiques, Paris, La Découverte,
