= Pessac =

- Commune
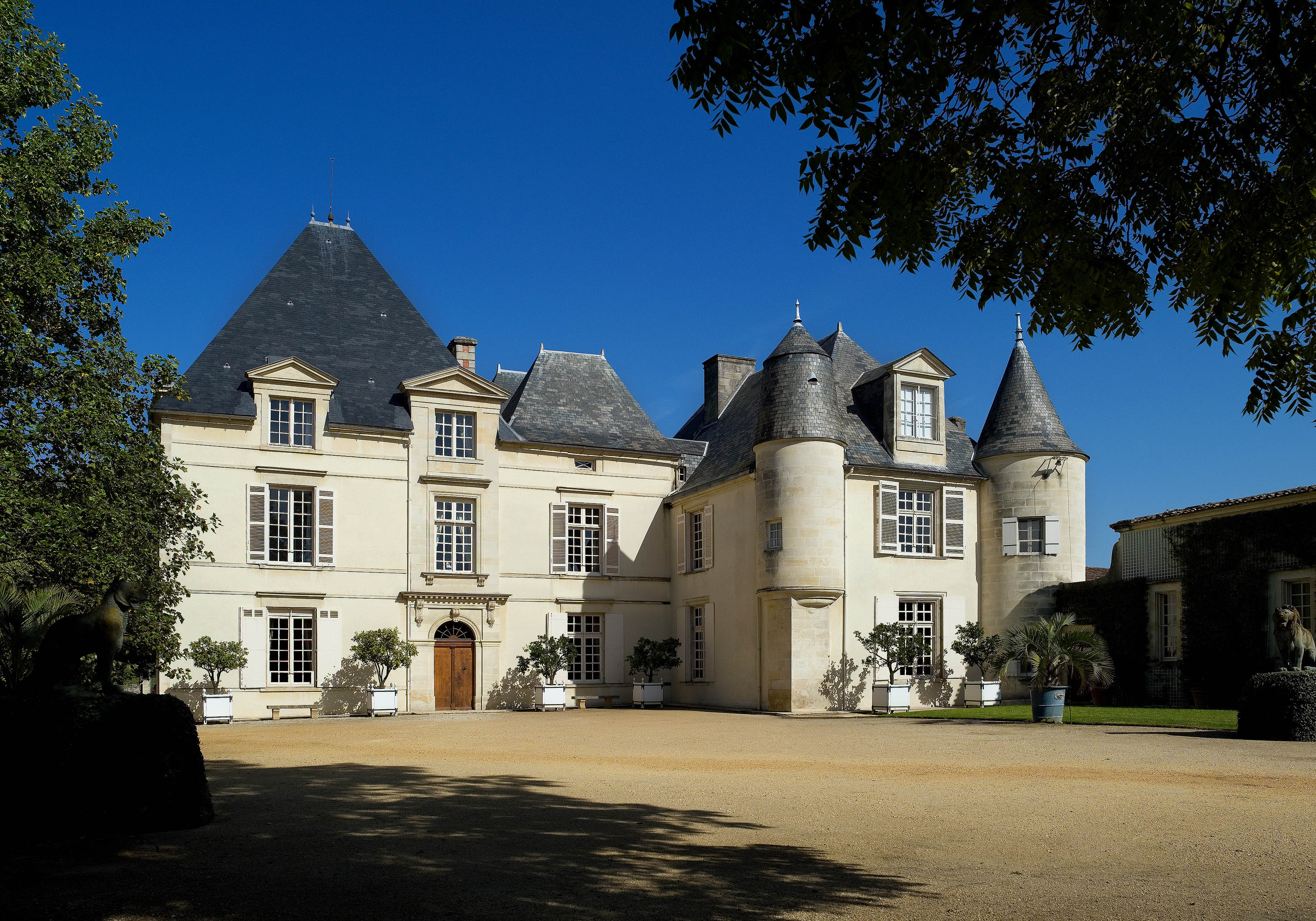
- Chateau Haut-Brion

- Flag Coat of arms
- Location of Pessac
- Location within France Location within Nouvelle-Aquitaine
- Coordinates: 44°48′24″N 0°37′52″W
- Country: France
- Region: Nouvelle-Aquitaine
- Department: Gironde
- Arrondissement: Bordeaux
- Canton: Pessac-1 and 2
- Intercommunality: Bordeaux Métropole

Government
  - Mayor (2020–2026): Franck Raynal
- Area^{1}: 38.82 km^{2} (14.99 sq mi)
- Highest elevation: 56 m (184 ft)
- Lowest elevation: 12 m (39 ft)
- Population (2023): 67,339
  - Density: 1,735/km^{2} (4,493/sq mi)
- Time zone: UTC+01:00 (CET)
  - Summer (DST): UTC+02:00 (CEST)
- INSEE/Postal code: 33318 /33600
- ^{1} French Land Register data, which excludes lakes, ponds, glaciers > 1 km^{2} (0.386 sq mi or 247 acres) and river estuaries.

Pessac (French pronunciation: [pɛsak]; Occitan: Peçac) is a commune in the Gironde department in Nouvelle-Aquitaine in southwestern France. It is a member of the metropolis of Bordeaux, being the second-largest suburb of Bordeaux and located just southwest of it.

Pessac is home to Bordeaux Montaigne University, the Institut d'études politiques de Bordeaux, and the main production facility of the Monnaie de Paris. It is also in the Pessac-Léognan wine region.

== Geography ==
Pessac is located in the south of the Bordeaux metro area and is surrounded by Bordeaux, Talence, Gradignan, Canéjan, Cestas, Saint-Jean-d'Illac and Mérignac.

The western part of the commune is part of the Landes de Bordeaux.

== History ==
The Hôtel de Ville was established in 1868.

Early in World War II (June 22, 1940), the town was the scene of a quadruple execution on the firing range of Verthamon. Four communist militants, one of whom, Roger Rambaud, was 17-years-old, were among the escapees from the military prison in Paris, were killed secretly by soldiers of the Third Republic. This case, classified "Secret Defense" for 70 years, was revealed by historian Jacky Tronel, in a 2010 article in the history journal Arkheia, which focuses on the history of the French Great South-West region.

In 1973, the main production facility of the Monnaie de Paris moved to Pessac.

== Neighborhoods ==
Neighborhoods of Pessac :

- Verthamon
- Les échoppes
- Brivazac - Candau
- Noës
- Pessac-bourg
- Casino
- Sardine
- Chiquet
- Compostelle - La Paillère
- Le Monteil
- CCLAPS - La Chataigneraie
- Saige - Formanoir
- 3 M (Macédo, Mirante, Monbalon)
- France - L'Alouette
- Cap de Bos
- Magonty - Romainville
- Toctoucau

== Heritage ==
=== Wineries ===
Located on the Pessac-Léognan appellation, there are several wineries, including Château Haut-Brion.

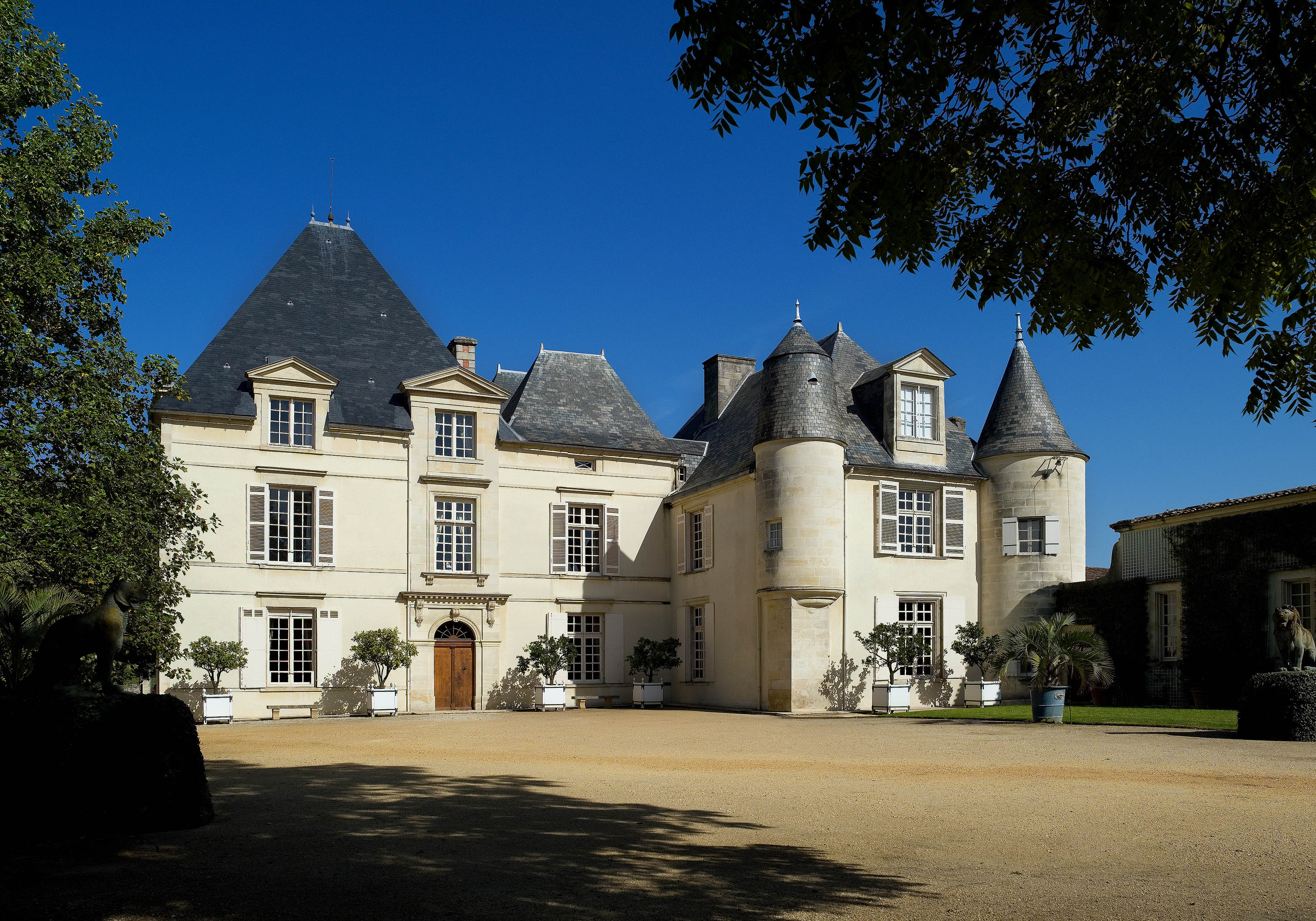
Château Haut-Brion

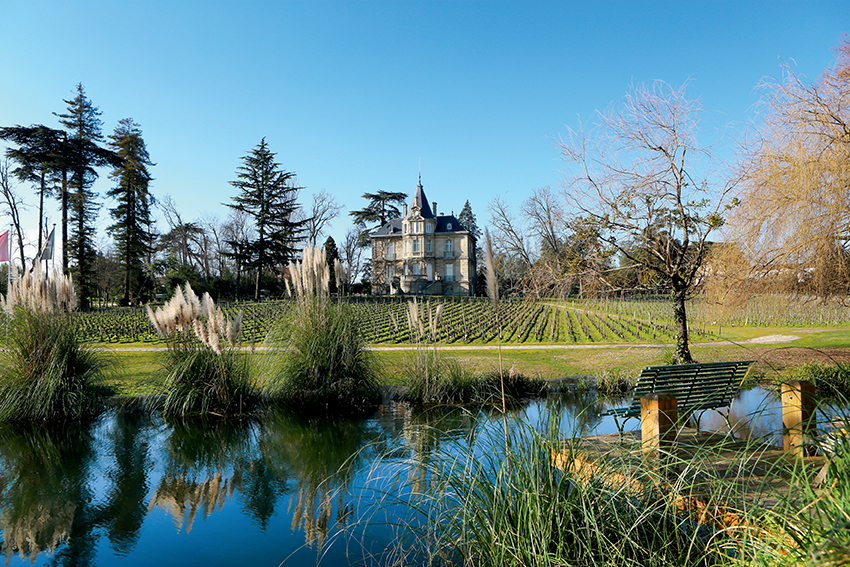
Château Les Carmes Haut-Brion

=== Cité Frugès ===
Built by Le Corbusier in 1926, the district is an experimental housing for workers. This is one of the 17 architectural works of Le Corbusier listed as a UNESCO World Heritage Site since 2016.

=== Casino district ===
Quarter built in the 1900s with a resort city architecture.

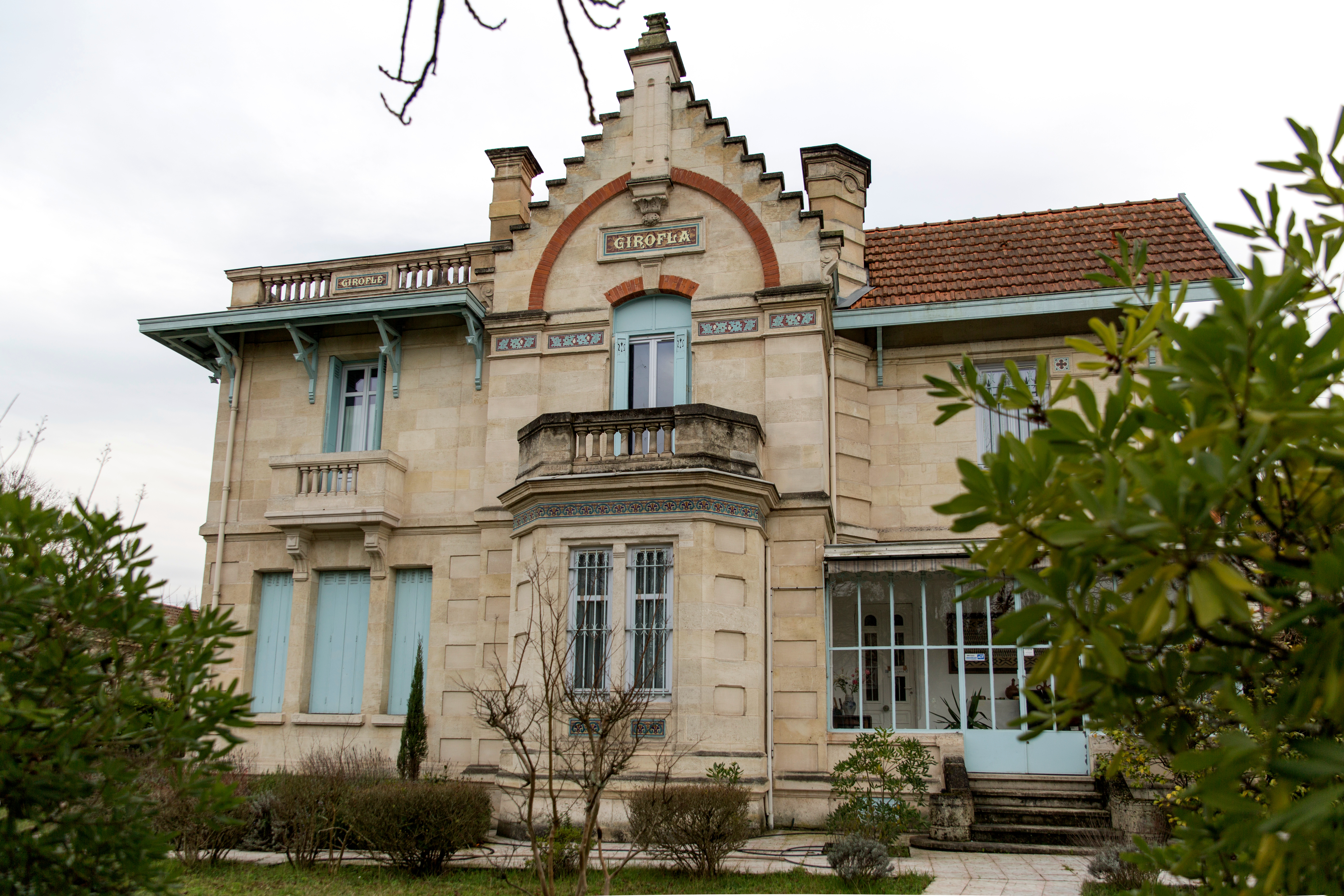
Villa Girofla

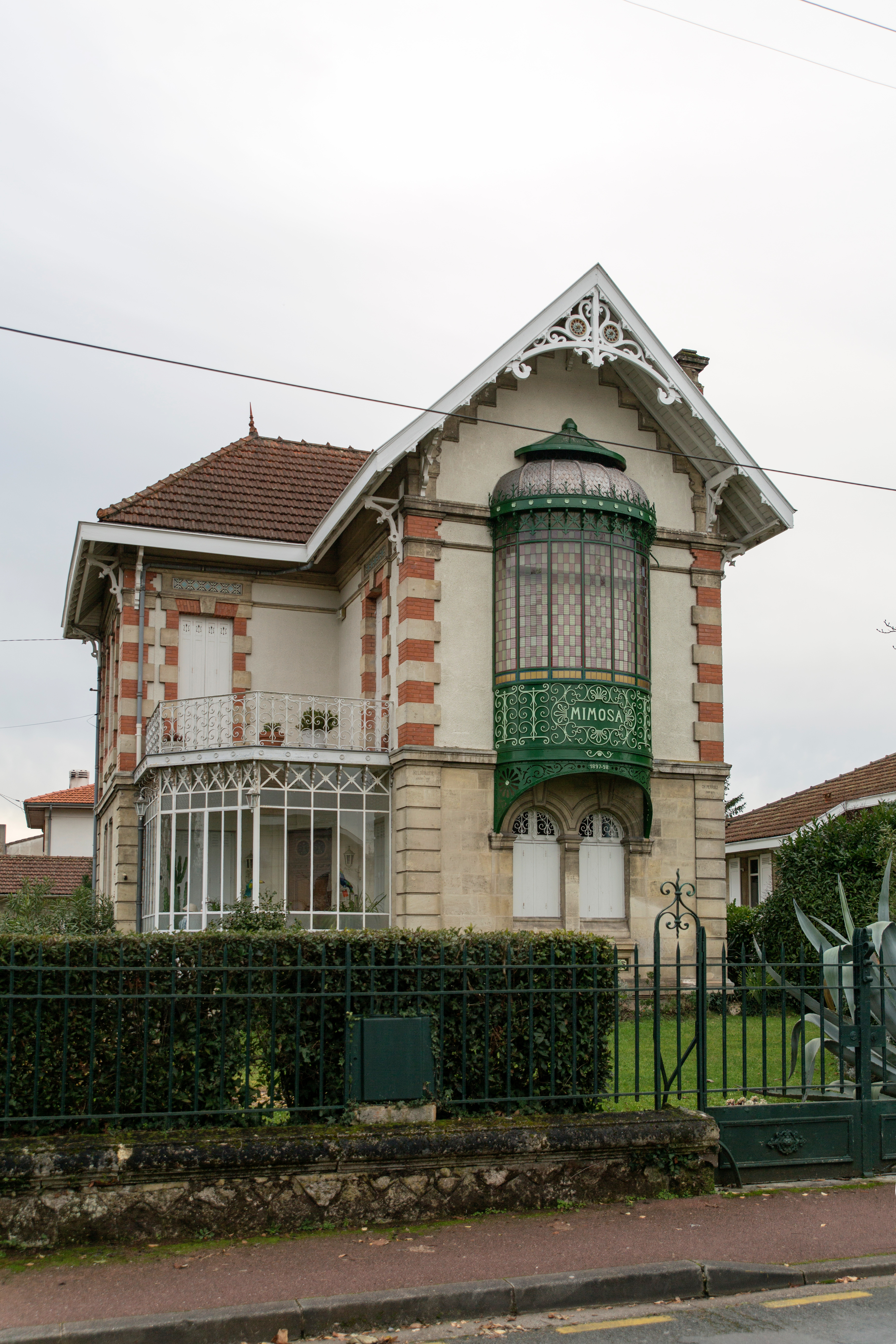
Villa Mimosa

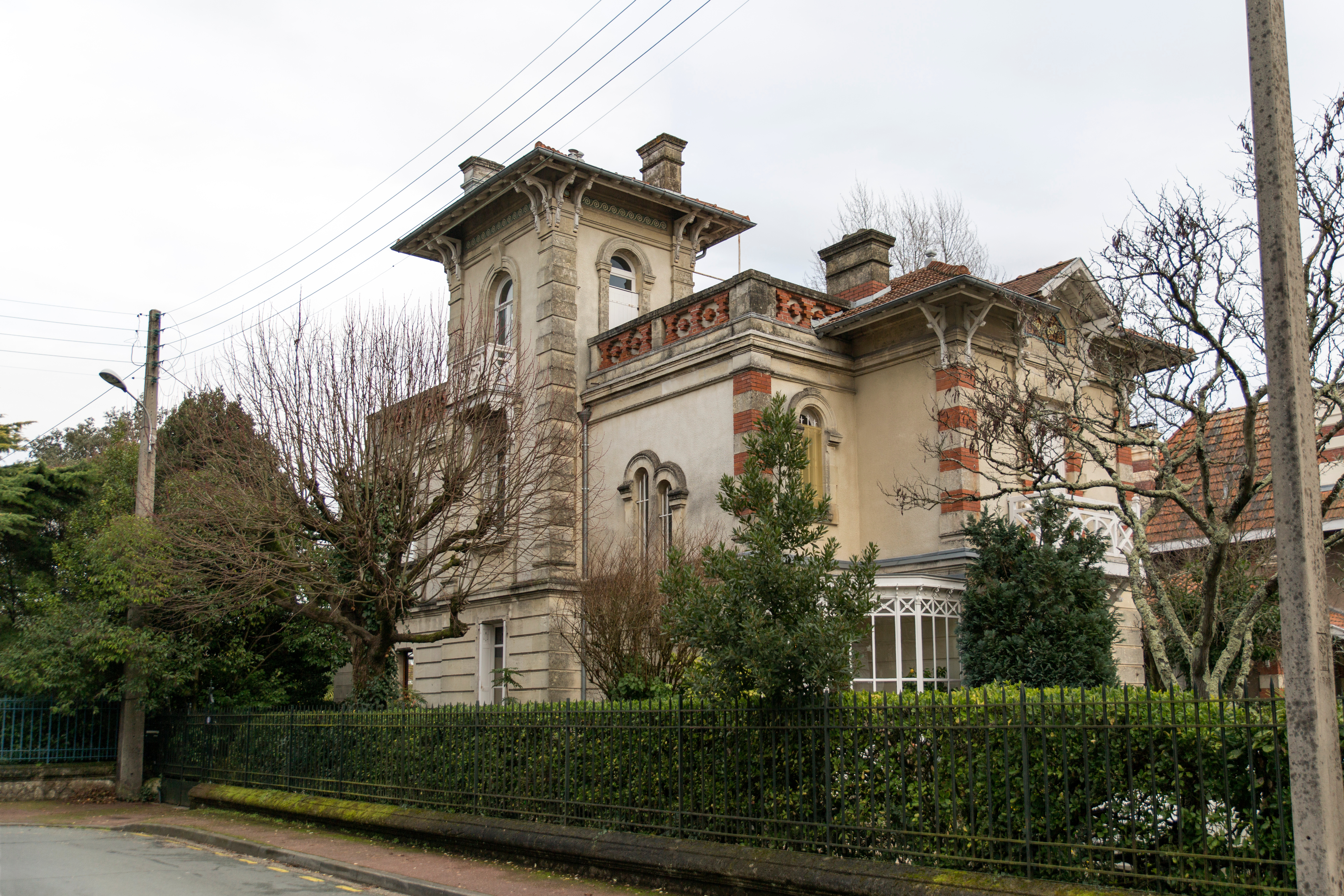
Villa Tour

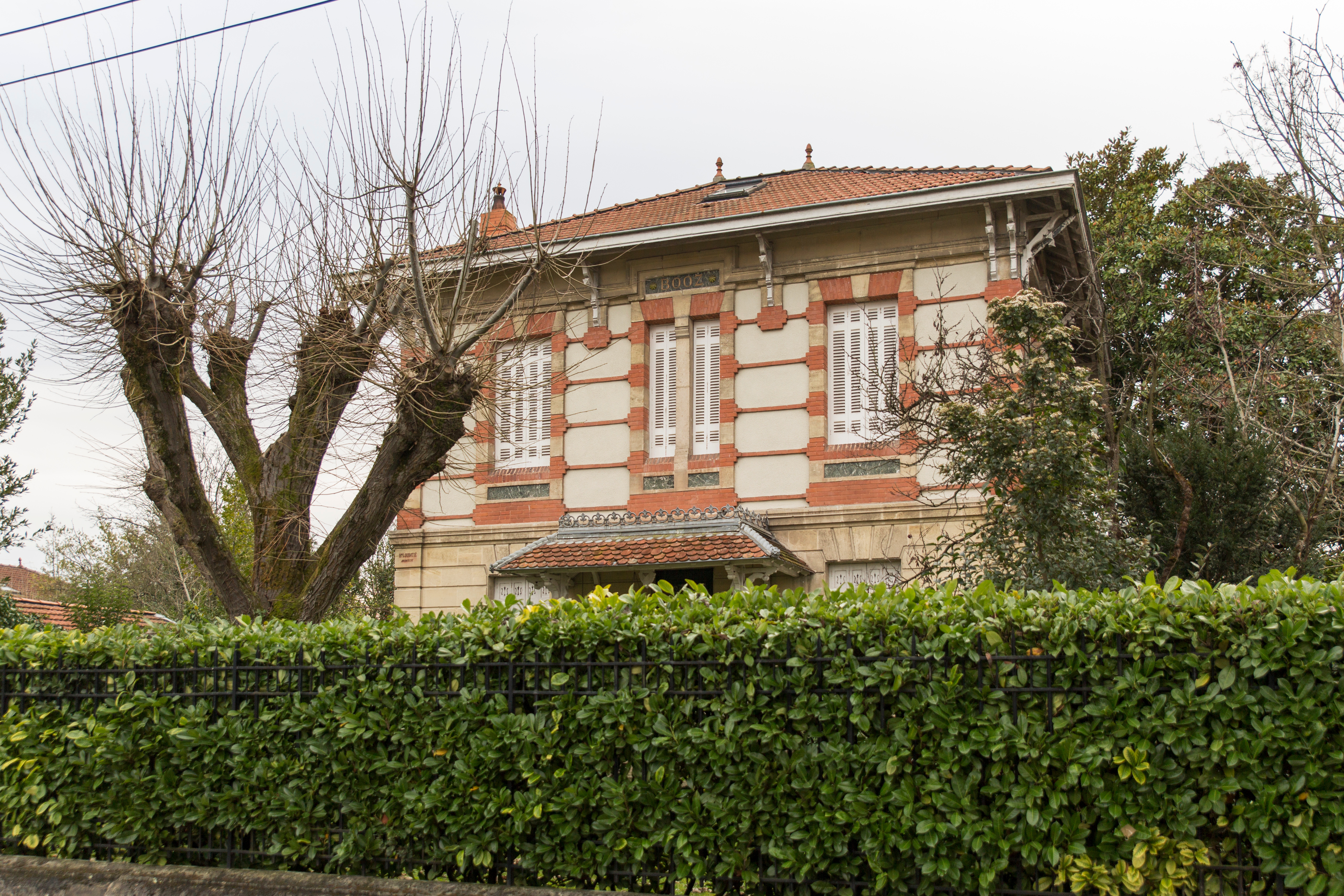
Villa Booz

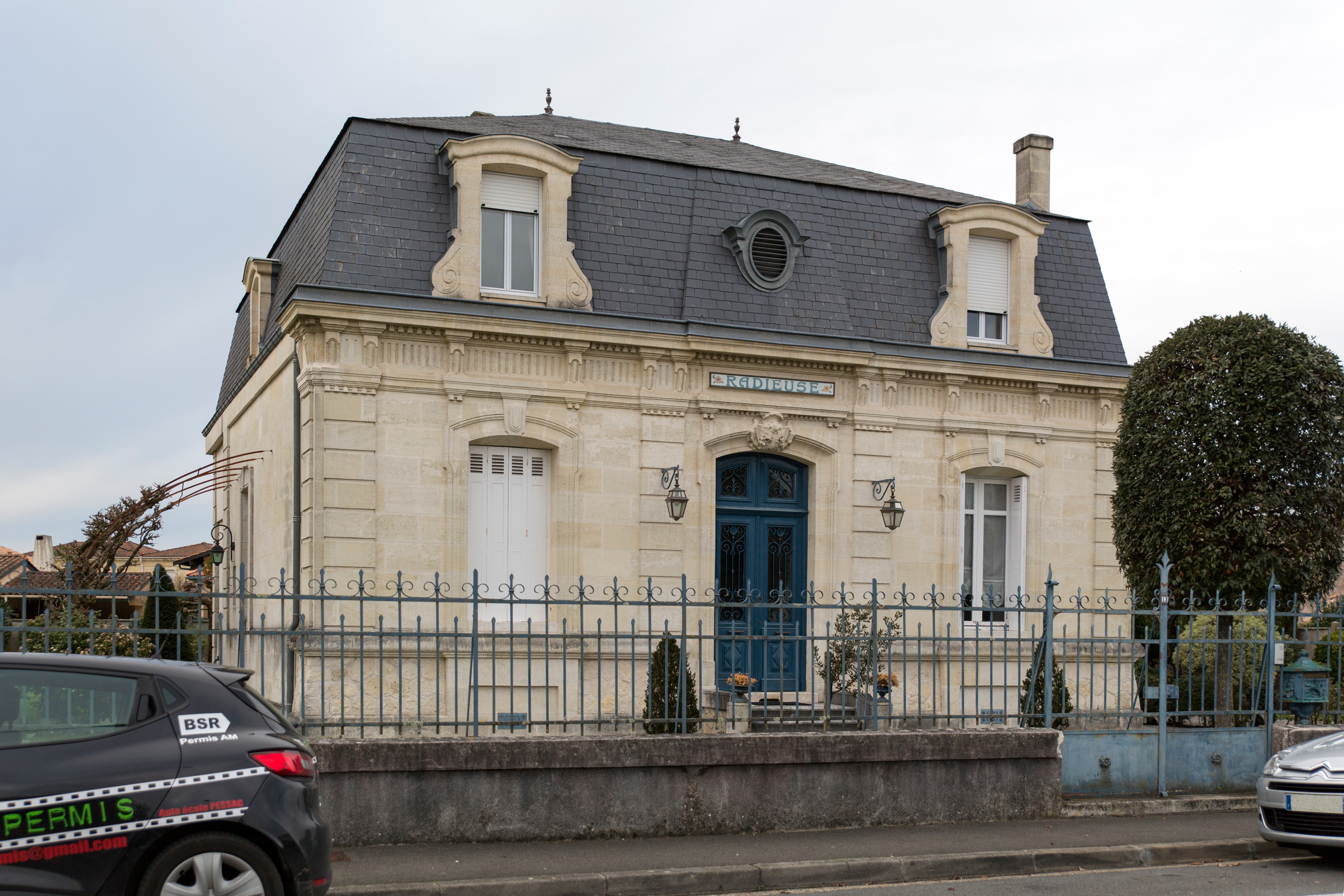
Villa Radieuse

=== Others ===
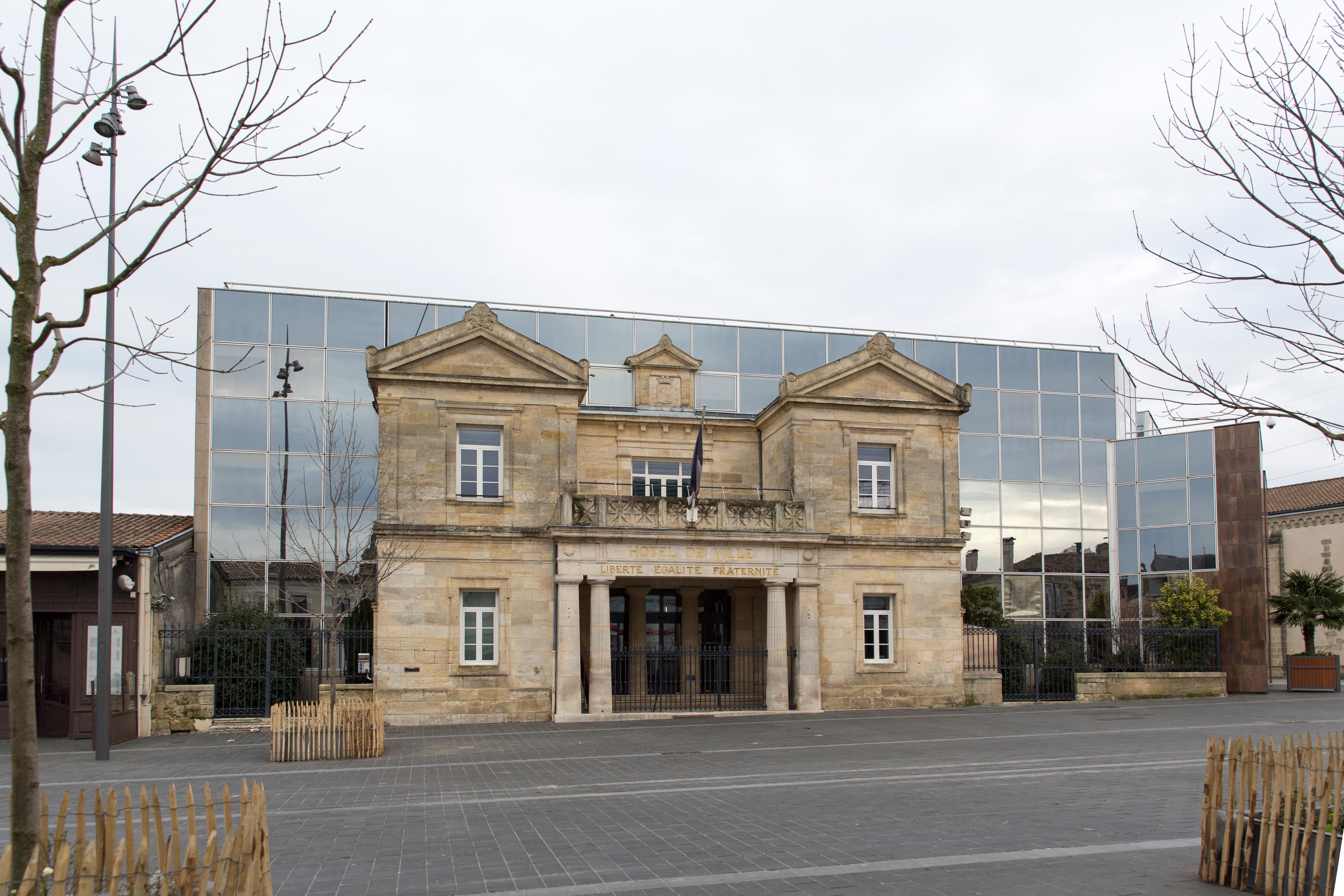
Hôtel de Ville (Town hall)

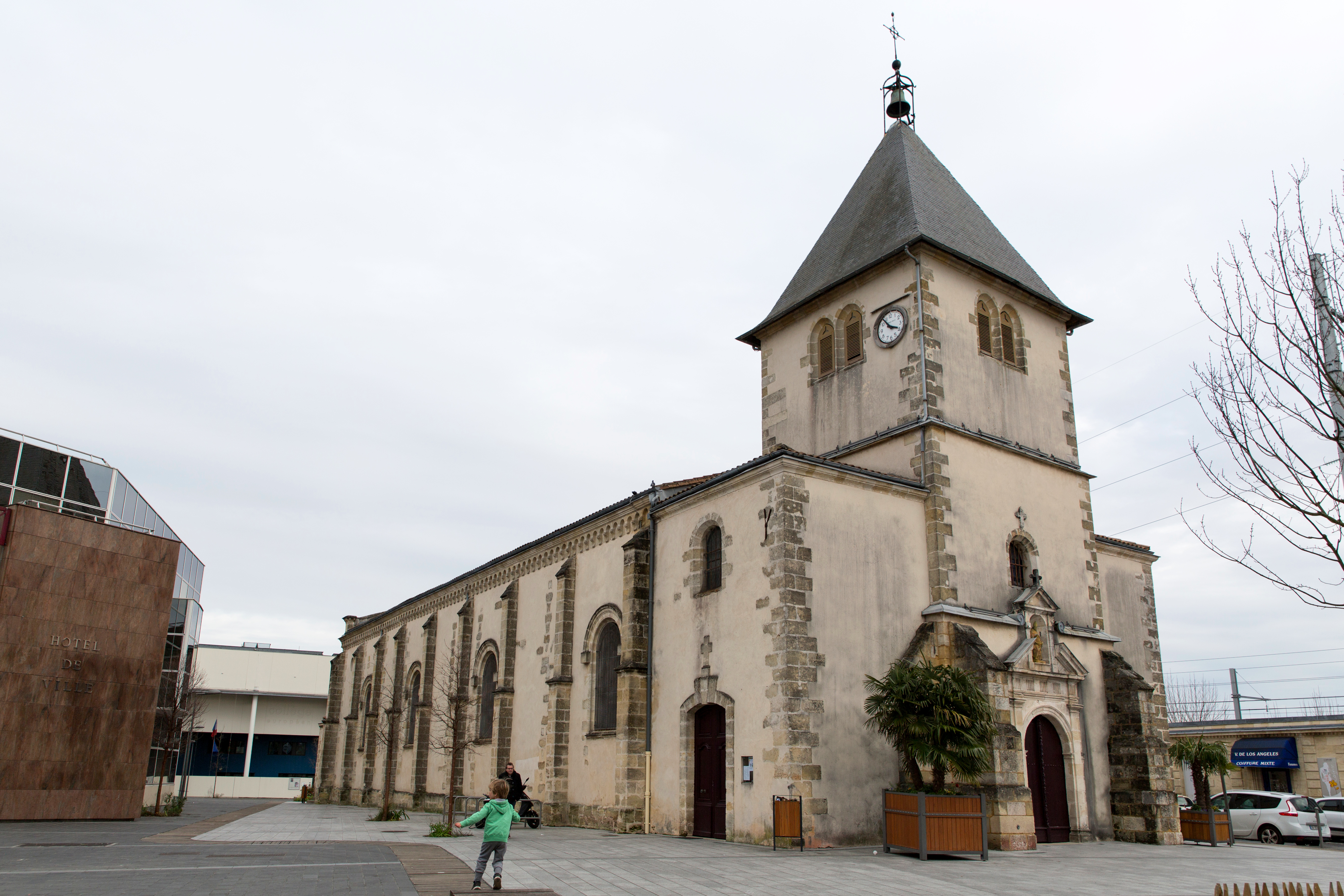
Church of Saint Martin

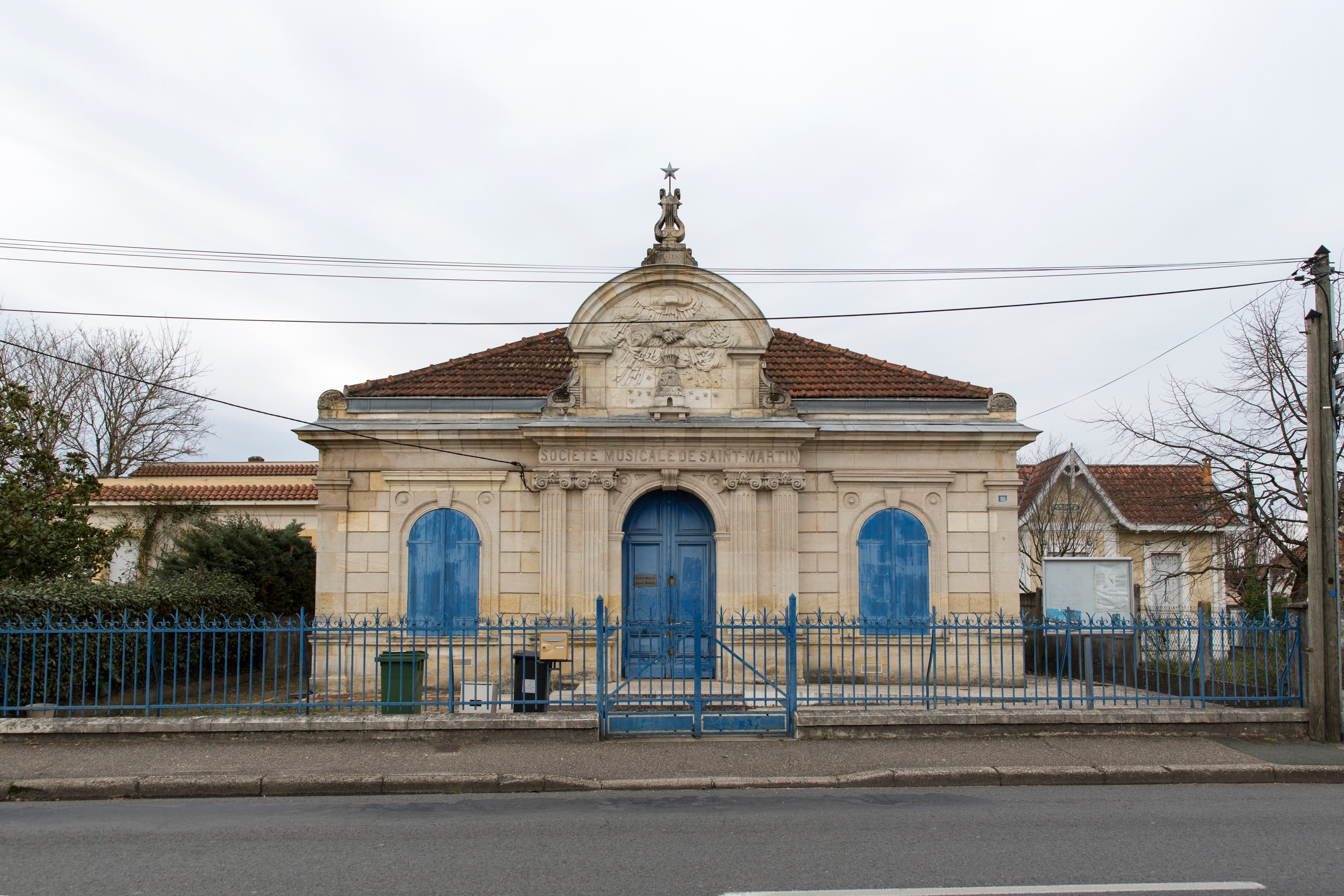
Music school

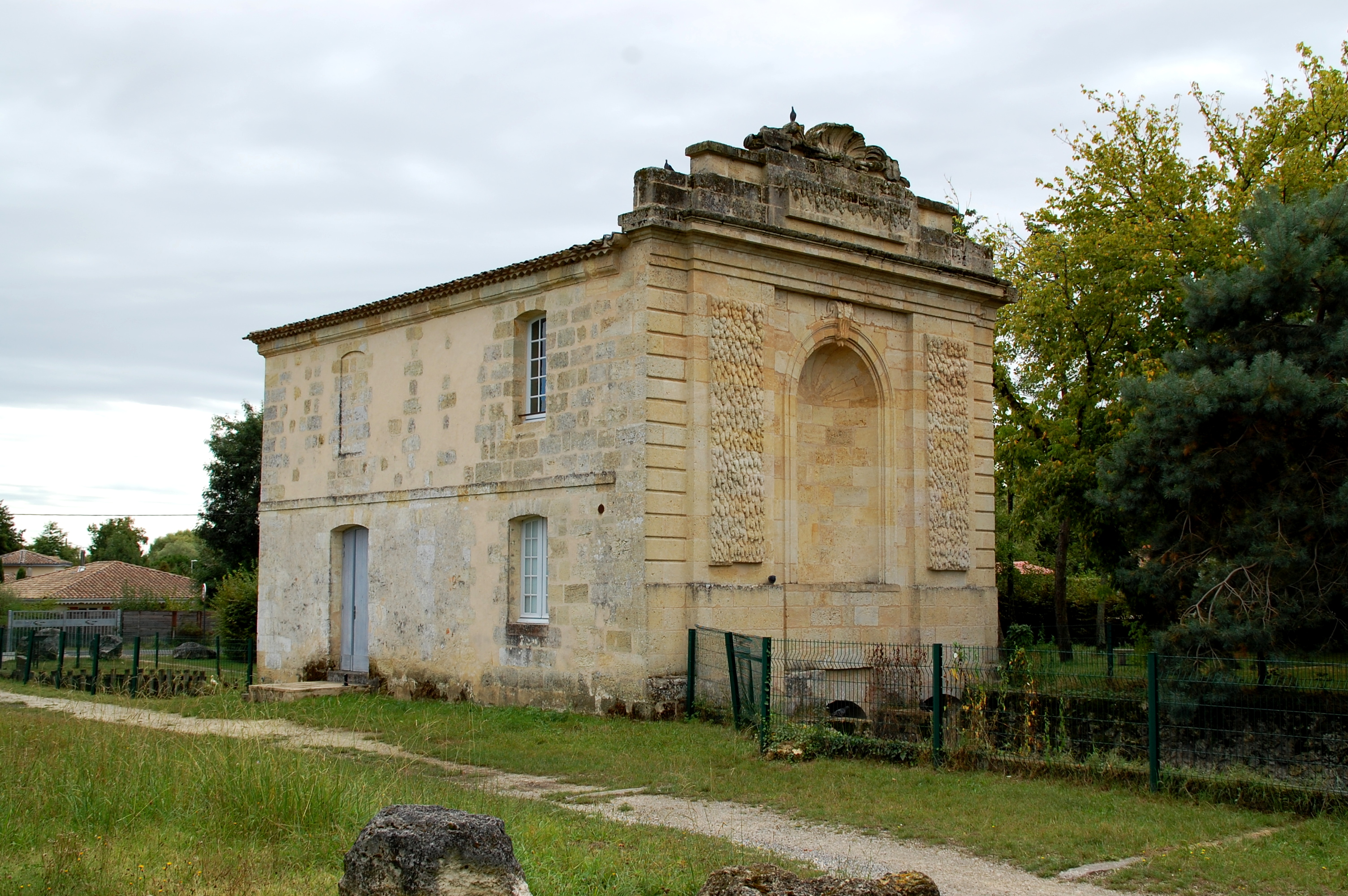
Moulin de Noès

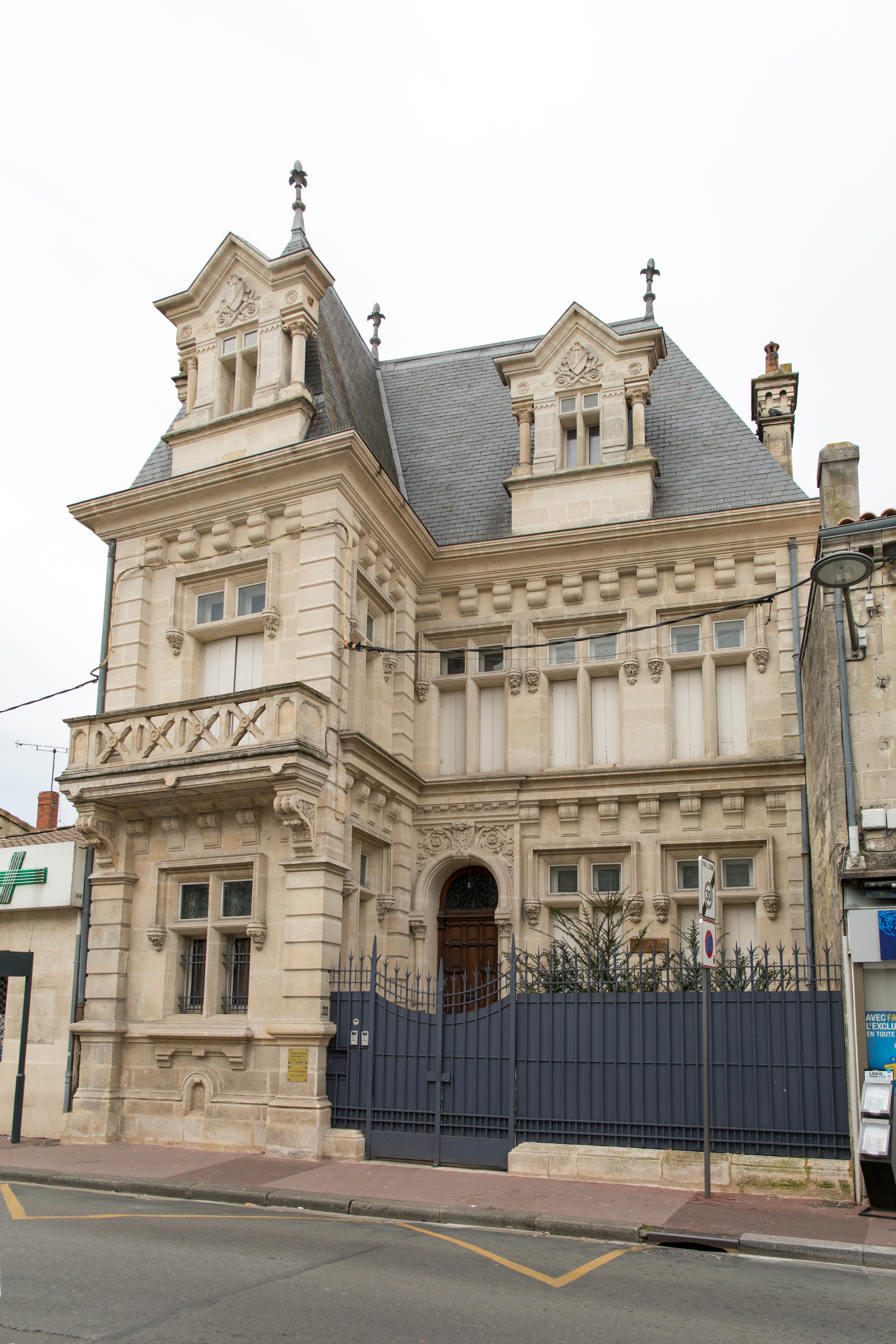
Castel du bourg, private house

== Population ==
Historical population

| Year | Pop. | ±% p.a. |
|---|---|---|
| 1793 | 1,430 | — |
| 1800 | 1,336 | −0.97% |
| 1806 | 1,414 | +0.95% |
| 1821 | 1,349 | −0.31% |
| 1831 | 1,502 | +1.08% |
| 1836 | 1,341 | −2.24% |
| 1841 | 1,708 | +4.96% |
| 1846 | 1,785 | +0.89% |
| 1851 | 2,094 | +3.24% |
| 1856 | 2,334 | +2.19% |
| 1861 | 2,537 | +1.68% |
| 1866 | 2,676 | +1.07% |
| 1872 | 4,743 | +10.01% |
| 1876 | 3,103 | −10.06% |
| 1881 | 3,227 | +0.79% |
| 1886 | 3,759 | +3.10% |
| 1891 | 3,944 | +0.97% |
| 1896 | 4,411 | +2.26% |
| 1901 | 4,239 | −0.79% |

| Year | Pop. | ±% p.a. |
|---|---|---|
| 1906 | 4,612 | +1.70% |
| 1911 | 5,234 | +2.56% |
| 1921 | 6,691 | +2.49% |
| 1926 | 8,268 | +4.32% |
| 1931 | 10,706 | +5.30% |
| 1936 | 13,004 | +3.97% |
| 1946 | 17,769 | +3.17% |
| 1954 | 19,226 | +0.99% |
| 1962 | 24,281 | +2.96% |
| 1968 | 36,986 | +7.27% |
| 1975 | 51,360 | +4.80% |
| 1982 | 50,267 | −0.31% |
| 1990 | 51,055 | +0.19% |
| 1999 | 56,143 | +1.06% |
| 2007 | 57,851 | +0.38% |
| 2012 | 59,223 | +0.47% |
| 2017 | 63,808 | +1.50% |
| 2023 | 67,339 | +0.90% |

Source: EHESS and INSEE (1968-2023)

== Education ==
9 Kindergartens

- École maternelle Alouette
- École maternelle Cap de Bos
- École maternelle François Mauriac
- École maternelle Joliot-Curie
- École maternelle Le Colombier
- École maternelle Le Monteil
- École maternelle Le Pontet
- École maternelle Montesquieu
- École maternelle Pape Clément

15 Grade schools

- École primaire Cap de Bos
- École primaire Édouard Herriot
- École primaire Jacques Cartier
- École primaire Joliot-Curie
- École primaire Montesquieu
- École primaire Pierre Castaing
- École primaire Toctoucau
- École Aristide Briand
- École de Magonty
- École Georges Leygues
- École Jean Cordier
- École Jeanne d'Arc Assomption
- École Jules Ferry
- École Roland Dorgelès
- École Saint Exupéry

5 Middle schools

- Collège Alouette
- Collège François Mitterrand (Ladonne)
- Collège Gérard Philipe
- Collège Pessac (Noès)
- Collège Sainte-Jeanne d'Arc Assomption

3 High schools

- Lycée Pape-Clément: financed by the French government, "Région Nouvelle-Aquitaine" and "Bordeaux Métropole"; was presented as the high school of the year 2000. It was inaugurated on 9 July 1987 by Jacques Chirac, then Prime Minister. Its initial capacity was 1,100 students including 900 "demi-pensionnaires". It was expanded in 1990 and now holds 1,475 students.
- Lycée Sans Frontière
- Lycée professionnel Philadelphe de Gerde

== Transportation ==
Pessac has a railway station on the westbound line from Bordeaux, Gare de Pessac. Pessac is also served by the urban transport network of the Bordeaux agglomeration, Transports Bordeaux Métropole (TBM).

Pessac is located on line B of the Tramway de Bordeaux.

== Personalities ==
- 1929: Yvette Roudy, socialist minister
- 1938: Jean Eustache, film actor and director (d. 1981)
- 1953: Patrice Brun, historian
- 1979: Myriam Korfanty, handball player, Olympian

== Twin towns and sister cities ==
Pessac is twinned with:

- Banfora, Burkina Faso
- Burgos, Spain
- Galați, Romania
- Göppingen, Germany
- Viana do Castelo, Portugal

== See also ==
- Château Haut-Brion
- Pessac-Léognan, wine appellation
- Communes of the Gironde department
- Operation Josephine B, a 1941 attack on an electricity substation.
