= 2024 French legislative election in Gironde =

Following the first round of the 2024 French legislative election on 30 June 2024, runoff elections in each constituency where no candidate received a vote share greater than 50 percent were scheduled for 7 July. Candidates permitted to stand in the runoff elections needed to either come in first or second place in the first round or achieve more than 12.5 percent of the votes of the entire electorate (as opposed to 12.5 percent of the vote share due to low turnout).

== Gironde ==
=== 1st constituency ===
Candidate	Party or alliance		First round		Second round	
Candidate	Party or alliance		Votes	%	Votes	%
Thomas Cazenave	Ensemble	Renaissance	28,564	38.31	31,768	43.20
Céline Papin	New Popular Front	The Ecologists	25,517	34.23	26,425	35.94
Bruno Paluteau	National Rally		15,654	21.00	15,336	20.86
Béatrice Pomarel	Miscellaneous centre	Independent	3,143	4.22		
Virginie Tournay	Reconquête		1,164	1.56		
Fanny Quandalle	Far-left	Lutte Ouvrière	511	0.69		
Total			74,553	100.00	73,529	100.00
Valid votes			74,553	98.17	73,529	98.17
Invalid votes			388	0.51	305	0.41
Blank votes			1,002	1.32	1,064	1.42
Total votes			75,943	100.00	74,898	100.00
Registered voters/turnout			105,863	71.74	105,877	70.74

=== 2nd constituency ===
Candidate	Party or alliance		First round		Second round	
Candidate	Party or alliance		Votes	%	Votes	%
Nicolas Thierry	New Popular Front	The Ecologists	26,547	49.45	27,920	59.01
Véronique Juramy	Ensemble	Renaissance	15,610	29.08	19,391	40.99
Flavie Fournier	National Rally		7,510	13.99		
Christine Errera	The Republicans		3,692	6.88		
Guy Dupont	Far-left	Lutte Ouvrière	307	0.57		
Yanis Iva	Far-right	Independent	20	0.04		
David Pijoan	Far-left	New Anticapitalist Party (Note: Dissident who ran without the backing of the New Popular Front)	0	0.00		
Total			53,686	100.00	47,311	100.00
Valid votes			53,686	98.67	47,311	93.76
Invalid votes			197	0.36	832	1.65
Blank votes			529	0.97	2,317	4.59
Total votes			54,412	100.00	50,460	100.00
Registered voters/turnout			74,146	73.38	74,153	68.05

=== 3rd constituency ===
Candidate	Party or alliance		First round		Second round	
Candidate	Party or alliance		Votes	%	Votes	%
Loïc Prud'homme	New Popular Front	La France Insoumise	30,664	49.83	32,525	53.84
Ariane Ary	Ensemble	Democratic Movement	17,080	27.75	15,905	26.33
Maryvonne Basteres	National Rally		12,037	19.56	11,983	19.84
Cyrille Doumenge	Reconquête		679	1.10		
Jacques Guldner	Far-left	Lutte Ouvrière	572	0.93		
Flora Savino	Miscellaneous left	Independent	305	0.50		
Nathan Minvielle-Larrousse	Far-left	New Anticapitalist Party	196	0.32		
Johan Giraud-Girard	Independent		4	0.01		
Yacine Touzani	Independent		2	0.00		
Total			61,539	100.00	60,413	100.00
Valid votes			61,539	97.41	60,413	97.77
Invalid votes			463	0.73	395	0.64
Blank votes			1,176	1.86	985	1.59
Total votes			63,178	100.00	61,793	100.00
Registered voters/turnout			91,635	68.95	91,664	67.41

=== 4th constituency ===
Candidate	Party or alliance		First round		Second round	
Candidate	Party or alliance		Votes	%	Votes	%
Alain David	New Popular Front	Socialist Party	27,092	42.36	37,141	61.48
Julie Rechagneux	National Rally		20,702	32.37	23,266	38.52
Fabrice Moretti	Ensemble	Democratic Movement	11,045	17.27		
Jérôme Lambert	The Republicans		4,387	6.86		
Anne-Isabelle Brivary	Far-left	Lutte Ouvrière	734	1.15		
Total			63,960	100.00	60,407	100.00
Valid votes			63,960	97.54	60,407	93.16
Invalid votes			532	0.81	1,028	1.59
Blank votes			1,081	1.65	3,406	5.25
Total votes			65,573	100.00	64,841	100.00
Registered voters/turnout			99,767	65.73	99,789	64.98

=== 5th constituency ===
Candidate	Party or alliance		First round		Second round	
Candidate	Party or alliance		Votes	%	Votes	%
Grégoire de Fournas	National Rally		35,457	42.32	39,656	49.37
Pascale Got	New Popular Front	Socialist Party	26,631	31.79	40,665	50.63
Stéphane Sence	Ensemble	Horizons	15,576	18.59		
Benoît Simian	Miscellaneous centre	Independent	3,041	3.63		
Laurent Toussaint	Miscellaneous right	The Republicans	2,218	2.65		
Thierry Fagegaltier	Far-left	Lutte Ouvrière	858	1.02		
Total			83,781	100.00	80,321	100.00
Valid votes			83,781	97.37	80,321	93.17
Invalid votes			618	0.72	1,360	1.58
Blank votes			1,641	1.91	4,525	5.25
Total votes			86,040	100.00	86,206	100.00
Registered voters/turnout			123,063	69.92	123,080	70.04

=== 6th constituency ===
Candidate	Party or alliance		First round		Second round	
Candidate	Party or alliance		Votes	%	Votes	%
Marie Récalde	New Popular Front	Socialist Party	27,564	35.24	31,079	39.78
Eric Poulliat	Ensemble	Renaissance	25,636	32.78	25,455	32.58
Jimmy Bourlieux	National Rally		21,174	27.07	21,600	27.64
Jonathan Florit	Ecologists	Miscellaneous right	1,387	1.77		
Nicole Destouesse	Reconquête		929	1.19		
Franck Bonhomme	Miscellaneous centre	Résistons	847	1.08		
Guillaume Perchet	Far-left	Lutte Ouvrière	673	0.86		
Total			78,210	100.00	78,134	100.00
Valid votes			78,210	97.61	78,134	97.72
Invalid votes			518	0.65	470	0.59
Blank votes			1,398	1.74	1,352	1.69
Total votes			80,126	100.00	79,956	100.00
Registered voters/turnout			109,009	73.50	109,035	73.33

=== 7th constituency ===
Candidate	Party or alliance		First round		Second round	
Candidate	Party or alliance		Votes	%	Votes	%
Sébastien Saint-Pasteur	New Popular Front	Socialist Party	21,913	38.50	24,810	43.82
Bérangère Couillard	Ensemble	Renaissance	18,854	33.12	19,164	33.85
Clémence Naveys-Dumas	National Rally		12,766	22.43	12,644	22.33
Ousmane Thiam	Ecologists	Miscellaneous centre	1,597	2.81		
Christelle Cotton	Miscellaneous centre	Independent	760	1.34		
Dominique De Witte	Reconquête		589	1.03		
Monique Oratto	Far-left	Lutte Ouvrière	442	0.78		
Total			56,921	100.00	56,618	100.00
Valid votes			56,921	97.92	56,618	97.81
Invalid votes			376	0.65	376	0.65
Blank votes			832	1.43	894	1.54
Total votes			58,129	100.00	57,888	100.00
Registered voters/turnout			80,692	72.04	80,696	71.74

=== 8th constituency ===
Candidate	Party or alliance		First round		Second round	
Candidate	Party or alliance		Votes	%	Votes	%
Laurent Lamara	National Rally		31,248	36.86	36,137	43.59
Sophie Panonacle	Ensemble	Renaissance	26,881	31.71	46,756	56.41
Marylène Faure	New Popular Front	Communist Party	15,849	18.70		
Marc Morin	The Republicans		8,673	10.23		
Marie-Christine Caries	Reconquête		1,090	1.29		
Rémy Coste	Far-left	Lutte Ouvrière	898	1.06		
Céline Blut	Independent		137	0.16		
Total			84,776	100.00	82,893	100.00
Valid votes			84,776	97.55	82,893	95.28
Invalid votes			663	0.76	1,085	1.25
Blank votes			1,463	1.68	3,023	3.47
Total votes			86,902	100.00	87,001	100.00
Registered voters/turnout			121,558	71.49	121,581	71.56

=== 9th constituency ===
Candidate	Party or alliance		First round		Second round	
Candidate	Party or alliance		Votes	%	Votes	%
François-Xavier Marques	National Rally		27,868	38.54	30,337	43.01
Sophie Mette	Ensemble	Democratic Movement	21,714	30.03	40,190	56.99
Corinne Martinez	New Popular Front	Socialist Party	20,163	27.89		
Jean-Philippe Delcamp	Far-left	Lutte Ouvrière	1,368	1.89		
Sylvie Mantel	Reconquête		1,188	1.64		
Total			72,301	100.00	70,527	100.00
Valid votes			72,301	96.45	70,527	94.32
Invalid votes			776	1.04	1,167	1.56
Blank votes			1,885	2.51	3,077	4.12
Total votes			74,962	100.00	74,771	100.00
Registered voters/turnout			103,847	72.19		

=== 10th constituency ===
Candidate	Party or alliance		First round		Second round	
Candidate	Party or alliance		Votes	%	Votes	%
Sandrine Chadourne	National Rally		25,037	43.80	26,555	47.83
Florent Boudie	Ensemble	Renaissance	17,128	29.96	28,960	52.17
Pascal Bourgois	New Popular Front	The Ecologists	13,885	24.29		
Hélène Halbin	Far-left	Lutte Ouvrière	1,117	1.95		
Total			57,167	100.00	55,515	100.00
Valid votes			57,167	96.83	55,515	94.53
Invalid votes			605	1.02	847	1.44
Blank votes			1,267	2.15	2,365	4.03
Total votes			59,039	100.00	58,727	100.00
Registered voters/turnout			83,589	70.63	83,620	70.23

=== 11th constituency ===
Candidate	Party or alliance		Votes	%
Edwige Diaz	National Rally		34,590	53.33
Véronique Hammerer	Ensemble	Renaissance	14,619	22.54
Célia Fonseca	New Popular Front	La France Insoumise	14,287	22.03
Zina Ahmimou	Far-left	Lutte Ouvrière	1,359	2.10
Total			64,855	100.00
Valid votes			64,855	96.17
Invalid votes			804	1.19
Blank votes			1,778	2.64
Total votes			67,437	100.00
Registered voters/turnout			99,996	67.44

=== 12th constituency ===
Candidate	Party or alliance		First round		Second round	
Candidate	Party or alliance		Votes	%	Votes	%
Rémy Berthonneau	National Rally		24,016	38.41	28,034	49.58
Mathilde Feld	New Popular Front	La France Insoumise	18,042	28.85	28,514	50.42
Pascal Lavergne	Ensemble	Renaissance	17,270	27.62		
Gabriel Landete	Miscellaneous right	Independent	2,180	3.49		
Richard Lavin	Far-left	Lutte Ouvrière	1,021	1.63		
Total			62,529	100.00	56,548	100.00
Valid votes			62,529	96.91	56,548	88.46
Invalid votes			580	0.90	1,743	2.73
Blank votes			1,413	2.19	5,636	8.82
Total votes			64,522	100.00	63,927	100.00
Registered voters/turnout			89,111	72.41	89,136	71.72
