= Sébastien Saint-Pasteur =

French politician (born 1980)

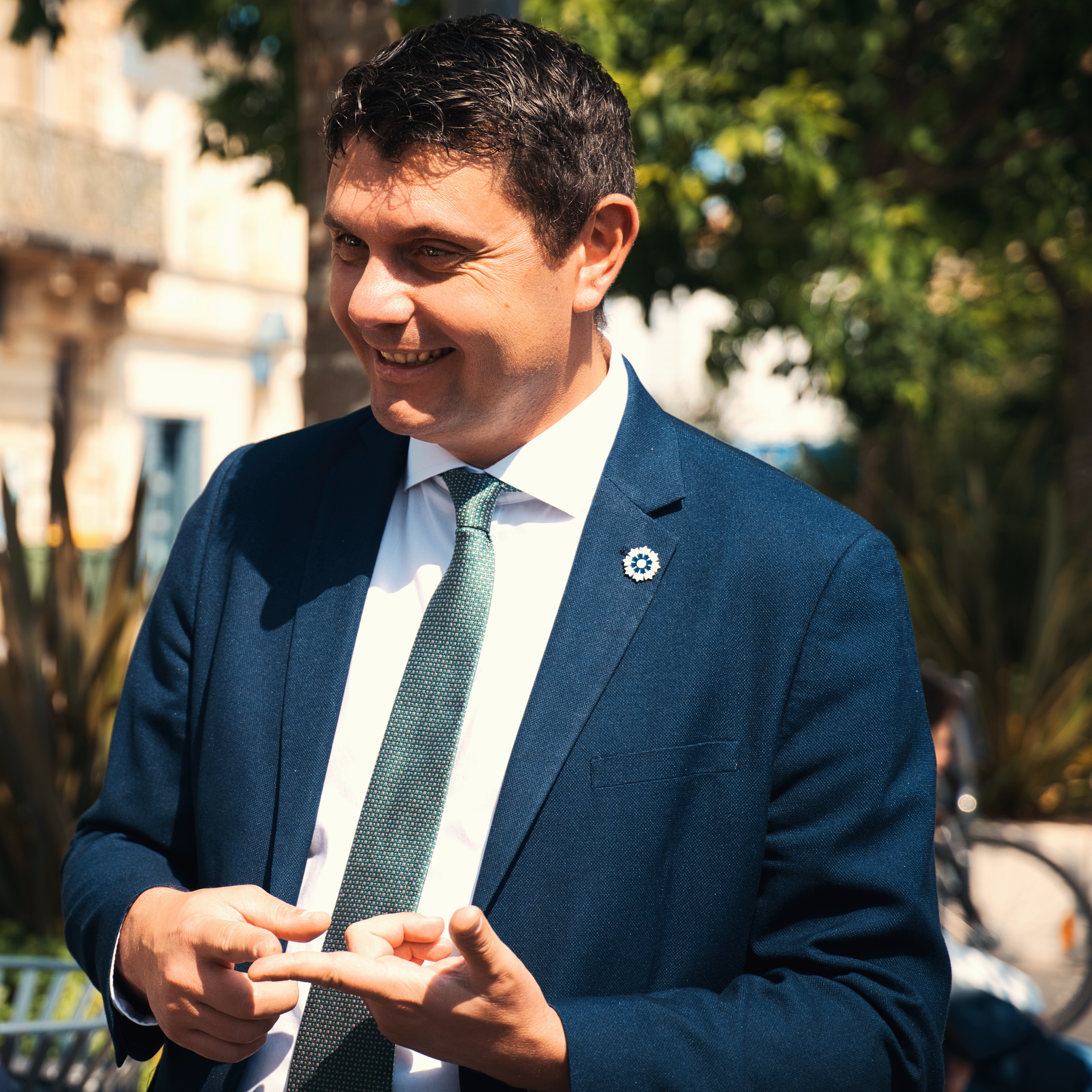
- Sébastien Saint-Pasteur in 2025

Member of the French National Assembly
- Incumbent
- Assumed office 18 July 2024
- Preceded by: Bérangère Couillard
- Parliamentary group: SOC
- Constituency: Gironde's 7th constituency

Departmental councillor of Gironde
- Incumbent
- Assumed office 29 March 2015
- President: Jean-Luc Gleyze
- Preceded by: Jean-Jacques Benoît
- Constituency: Canton of Pessac-2

5th Vice-President of the Departmental Council of Gironde
- In office April 2015 – 11 July 2024
- President: Jean-Luc Gleyze
- Preceded by: Christine Bost
- Succeeded by: Marie-Claude Agullana

Municipal councillor of Pessac
- In office 15 July 2020 – 2024

Metropolitan councillor of Bordeaux Métropole
- Incumbent
- Assumed office 28 June 2020
- President: Alain Anziani; Christine Bost

Personal details
- Born: 8 December 1980 (age 45) Tarbes, France
- Party: Socialist Party
- Other political affiliations: Réinventons Pessac Ensemble (2020 municipal election); New Popular Front (2024 legislative election)
- Education: Sciences Po Bordeaux

Sébastien Saint-Pasteur (born 8 December 1980 in Tarbes) is a French politician.

A member of the Socialist Party, he has served as a departmental councillor of Gironde since 29 March 2015 and as the deputy for Gironde's 7th constituency since 18 July 2024.

== Biography ==
Sébastien Saint-Pasteur was born on 8 December 1980 in Tarbes, in the Hautes-Pyrénées department.

He studied at the Institute of Political Studies of Bordeaux and worked as a project officer at the Regional Council of Aquitaine and as a parliamentary assistant to Socialist MP Alain Rousset from 2007 to 2017. He has been a departmental councillor of Gironde since 2015 (vice-president in charge of access to law, health, digital affairs, and local public services) and a municipal opposition councillor in Pessac.

At the 2020 municipal elections, he led the "Réinventons Pessac Ensemble" list (a left-wing coalition) but was defeated by incumbent mayor Franck Raynal (Horizons) by a margin of a few hundred votes. He was nevertheless re-elected as a municipal opposition councillor and metropolitan councillor in Bordeaux Métropole.

During the 2024 legislative elections, he was elected deputy for the 7th constituency of Gironde, receiving 43.82% of the vote in the second round, against 33.85% for outgoing Renaissance MP and former minister Bérangère Couillard and 22.33% for National Rally candidate Clémence Naveys-Dumas. He sits with the Socialist and allied group and is a member of the Committee on National Defence and Armed Forces.

== Electoral record ==
=== Legislative elections ===
Year	Party	Constituency	1st round			2nd round		
2024	PS	Gironde's 7th constituency	21,913	38.50%	1st	24,810	43.82%	Elected

=== Departmental elections ===
Year	Party	Canton	1st round			2nd round		
2015	PS	Canton of Pessac-2	6,694	40.69%	1st	7,934	50.86%	Elected
2021	PS	Canton of Pessac-2	4,884	40.71%	1st	4,841	57.71%	Elected

=== Municipal elections ===
Year	Coalition	Commune	1st round			2nd round			Seats (Municipal Council)
2020	UG–PS	Pessac	3,824	26.31%	2nd	7,508	49.42%	2nd	12 / 49
2026	UG–PS	Pessac	7,245	29,82	2nd	9468	41,19	2nd	10 / 49
