= Ministry for Human Rights (France) =

Ministry portfolio of the government of France

Minister responsible for Human Rights of the French Republic
- Ministère délégué aux Droits de l'Homme et à l'Action Humanitaire
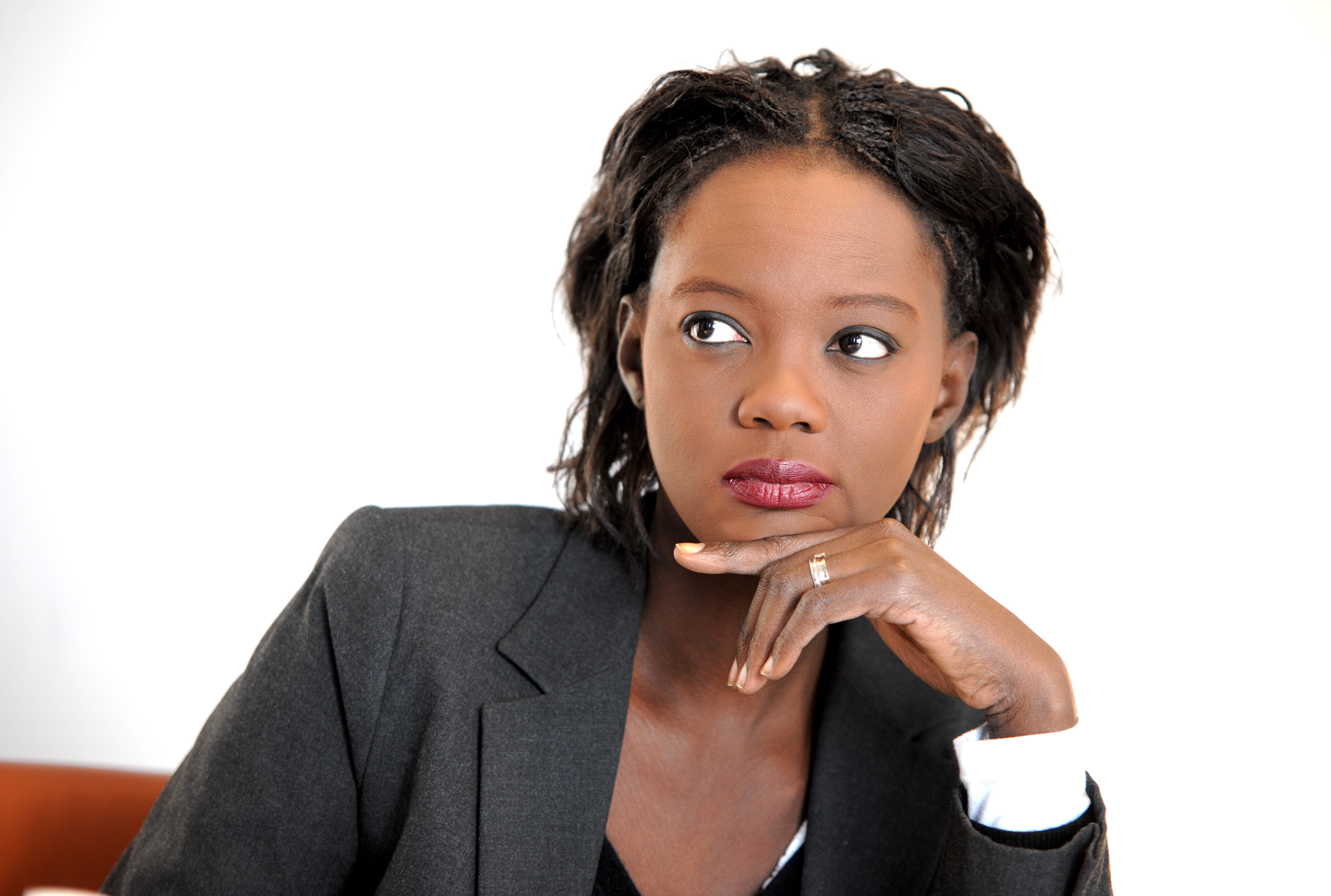
- Rama Yade, as the last holder
- Type: Delegated ministry
- Status: Defunct
- Member of: Government of France
- Reports to: The Prime Minister
- Seat: Paris
- Nominator: President of the Republic
- Appointer: Prime Minister
- Formation: 1986
- First holder: Claude Malhuret
- Final holder: Rama Yade
- Succession: Ambassador-at-large for Human Rights
- Website: https://www.diplomatie.gouv.fr/fr/politique-etrangere-de-la-france/droits-de-l-homme/l-ambassadrice-pour-les-droits-de-l-homme/

The Ministry responsible for Human Rights (French: ministère chargé des Droits de l’Homme), which also had responsibility for Humanitarian Action, was a French ministry created in 1986, initially attached to the Office of the Prime Minister and later placed under the authority of the Ministry for Europe and Foreign Affairs. In France, issues of human rights and political support for humanitarian action assume an important place in national politics, consistent with the country's association with the French Revolution, equality before the law, and the Declaration of the Rights of Man and of the Citizen. The remit of the delegated ministry was set out in 1994 by Minister Lucette Michaux-Chevry as follows: “Humanitarian disasters often stem from grave, large-scale violations of human rights, which then make it essential and urgent to take remedial action… The protection of human rights must, in France’s diplomacy towards international organisations, be a major concern and a constant imperative.”.

The ministry, created in 1986, was abolished in 2009 with the establishment of the post of French Ambassador-at-large for Human Rights, whose first holder was François Zimeray, a senior career diplomat appointed in 2008. The current ambassador is Isabelle Lonvis-Rome. Her full official title is: Ambassador for Human Rights and for Remembrance, with responsibility for the international dimension of the Shoah and for issues of spoliation. Operationally, France combines diplomatic outreach (joint statements, resolutions and pledges) with cooperation across the Geneva ecosystem — UN agencies, international organisations and civil society — to improve humanitarian access, strengthen protection frameworks and keep rights questions on the agenda during crises and protracted situations.

== History ==
The establishment of a delegated ministry for Human Rights came in March 1986, following the victory of the Union for French Democracy (UDF) and the Rally for the Republic (RPR) in the legislative elections — a defeat for the Socialist President, François Mitterrand, then in office, who was severely punished by left-wing voters for having pursued, since 1983, a so-called austerity policy. On 20 March 1986, Jacques Chirac was appointed Prime Minister by the President of the Republic; MP Claude Malhuret was appointed to head a new State Secretariat reporting to the Prime Minister, the State Secretariat responsible for Human Rights. Malhuret was then known for his humanitarian commitment: a medical doctor by training, he had been a coordinator of Médecins Sans Frontières medical teams in South-East Asia and served as the association's president for eight years. In 1985 he founded the association Liberté sans frontières.

The exact remit of the State Secretariat was subsequently clarified during parliamentary exchanges between deputies and the Secretary of State. The Communist senator from La Ciotat, Louis Minetti, during Government Questions on Friday, 6 June 1986, questioned the Secretary of State about the worsening of repressive measures taken by employers and endorsed by the former Government against the freedoms and dignity of employees in the context of strikes (“Economic and social rights, rights of representation and expression, rights of participation in the management of undertakings… all these rights are being flouted in France today”). In his reply, the Secretary of State stated at the outset that “the fact of authorising the dismissal of an employee holding a representative mandate cannot, in itself, be considered an infringement of human rights”, thereby setting a clear limit to his prerogatives and referring the issue of any infringement of the right to strike to the courts. The left in opposition and the right in government then held divergent views of government action on human rights: for the left, the conditions under which workers exercise their rights in the workplace — or, in short, labour law — lay at the very outer limit of the State Secretariat's competence. Malhuret presented a cautious, diplomatic approach: consult NGOs, coordinate across ministries, and avoid reacting to every news flash. Civil-society groups (notably the Ligue des Droits de l'Homme) worried the post might be a political “alibi” with limited bite.

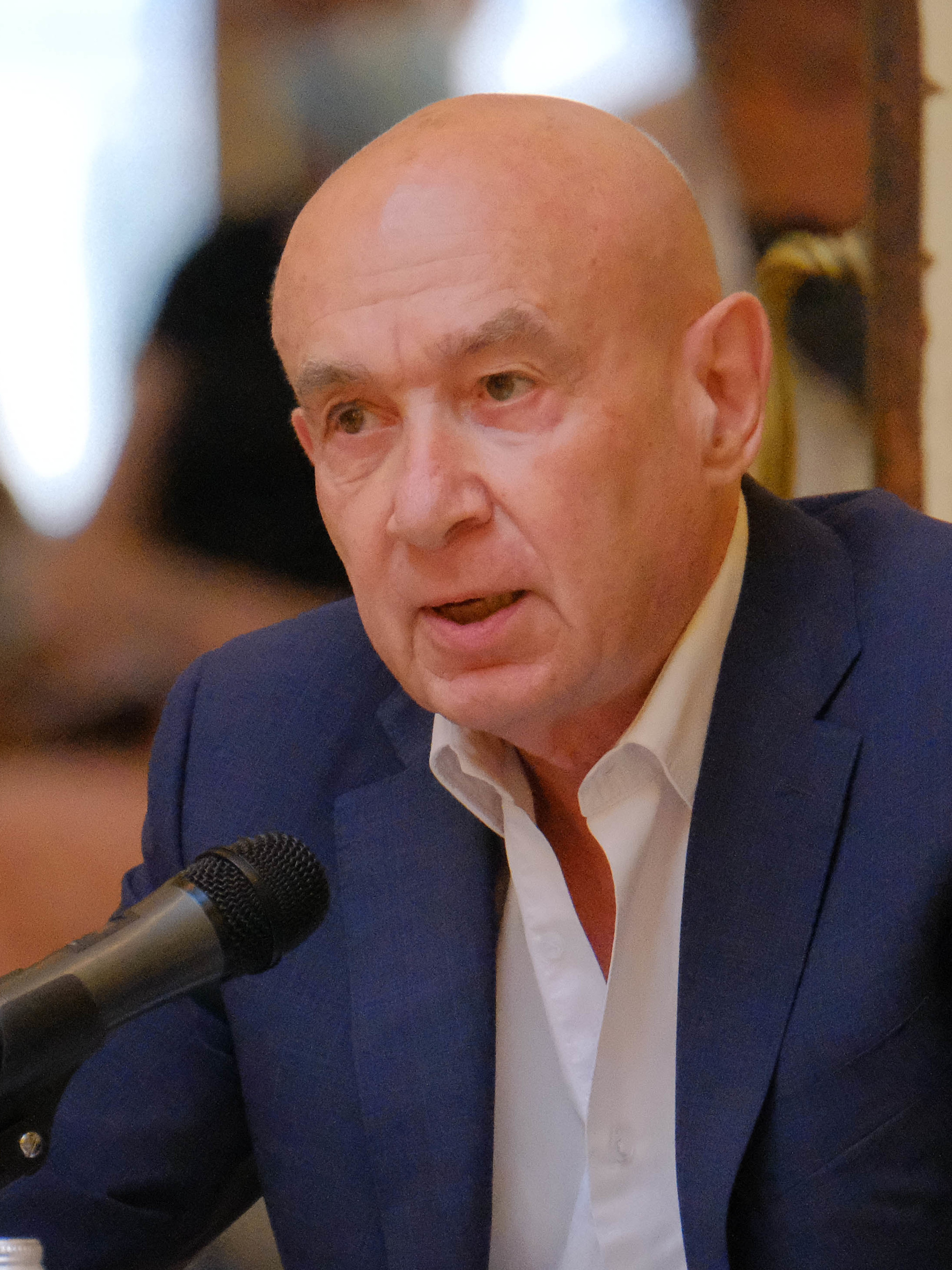
Claude Malhuret, first French Secretary of State for Human rights.

Malhuret's tenure at the State Secretariat is chiefly marked by the 1987 reform of parental authority: the law extended the exercise of parental authority by both parents to unmarried couples and divorced couples. In order to ensure that the children of divorced parents and children born out of wedlock were as far as possible protected from the tensions between parents in divorce proceedings, the Secretary of State responsible for Human Rights, Claude Malhuret, presented a bill on joint parental authority to the Council of Ministers on 11 March 1987. The bill was adopted unanimously by the National Assembly in May and then promulgated. The 1987 statute is known as the “Malhuret Law”. In May 1988, François Mitterrand was re-elected President of the Republic and the Socialists regained their majority in the National Assembly. Malhuret subsequently remained an active senator on humanitarian matters, speaking regularly in the Senate on such issues — for example, in 2022 on violations of women's rights and human rights in Iran, and in 2024 to support the proposal to enshrine the right to abortion in the French Constitution.

The post evolved into that of Secretary of State responsible for Humanitarian Action between 22 June 1988 and 4 April 1992 in the Socialist governments of Michel Rocard and Édith Cresson, before evolving as the Minister for Health and Humanitarian Action from 4 April 1992 to 30 March 1993 in Pierre Bérégovoy's government. The office was held by Bernard Kouchner, founder of Médecins Sans Frontières and Médecins du Monde, a proponent of the doctrine of humanitarian intervention (droit d’ingérence humanitaire), later formally recognised by the United Nations as the Responsibility to Protect. Jean-Pierre Chevènement, then his colleague as Minister of Defence, criticised this as neo-imperialism.

Minister between 1993 and 1995, during the second cohabitation between Édouard Balladur's conservative government and Socialist President François Mitterrand, the Guadeloupe MP Lucette Michaux-Chevry continued the ministry's international orientation, as initiated by her predecessor Bernard Kouchner. Addressing trainees at a summer university for human-rights educators, Michaux-Chevry cast July 1993–July 1994 as a year of “progress and concern,” urging the construction of a “culture of human rights” through education and training. She tied universality to pedagogy rather than uniformity, noting that fundamental liberties are shared even as cultures differ. Her speech highlighted historic abolitionism (1794/1848) to show that rights advances are reversible, condemns contemporary forms of slavery (including child prostitution) and curbs on freedom of opinion and the press, and encourages support for human-rights defenders. She linked trade and rights by referencing the GATT/Marrakesh context and argues that global economic integration must respect core social rights. Whereas Bernard Kouchner spoke of a right of humanitarian intervention, Michaux-Chevry preferred to popularise the term “duty to assist” (devoir d'assistance): in her view, humanitarian aid is “not merely charity but also the defence of values.”

Between 1997 and 2002, Lionel Jospin's left-wing coalition government redistributed the delegated ministry's competences to other departments, with social action and inclusion assigned to the Minister for Solidarity, and humanitarian aid to the Secretary of State for Cooperation and the Francophonie.

In 2007, following Nicolas Sarkozy's victory in the presidential election, the human-rights portfolio was entrusted to Rama Yade. The decree of 13 July 2007 set out her remit: “Ms Rama Yade, Secretary of State for Foreign Affairs and Human Rights, shall deal with all matters entrusted to her by the Minister of Foreign and European Affairs, to whom she is attached, for the implementation of France’s diplomatic action. She shall prepare and implement the Government’s international policy in the field of human rights. To this end, she conducts, or takes part in, international negotiations; represents the Government, or helps represent it, in international bodies dealing with the promotion and defence of human rights. She shall monitor the actions of the European Community and the European Union, and of the Council of Europe, in the promotion and defence of human rights.”

In December 2007, during Muammar Gaddafi’s state visit to France, Rama Yade publicly criticised the timing — coinciding with International Human Rights Day —and warned that the visit should not be treated as a “blank cheque” on rights. In an interview the same day, she argued that France should talk with Libya but also extract concrete human-rights commitments; the government's handling of the episode prompted intense media and political debate. According to contemporaneous reporting, she was swiftly summoned to the Élysée Palace after remarks including that France was “not a doormat” for any leader, while the presidency sought to lower the temperature. Yade later explained the institutional tension she faced — reconciling a values brief with diplomatic realpolitik — and subsequently recalled being sternly “reprimanded” by Nicolas Sarkozy, describing the meeting as feeling like “a dentist’s waiting room.”

On 23 June 2009, Rama Yade was appointed Minister for Sport and Youth, and the ministry was permanently abolished.

== Criticism ==
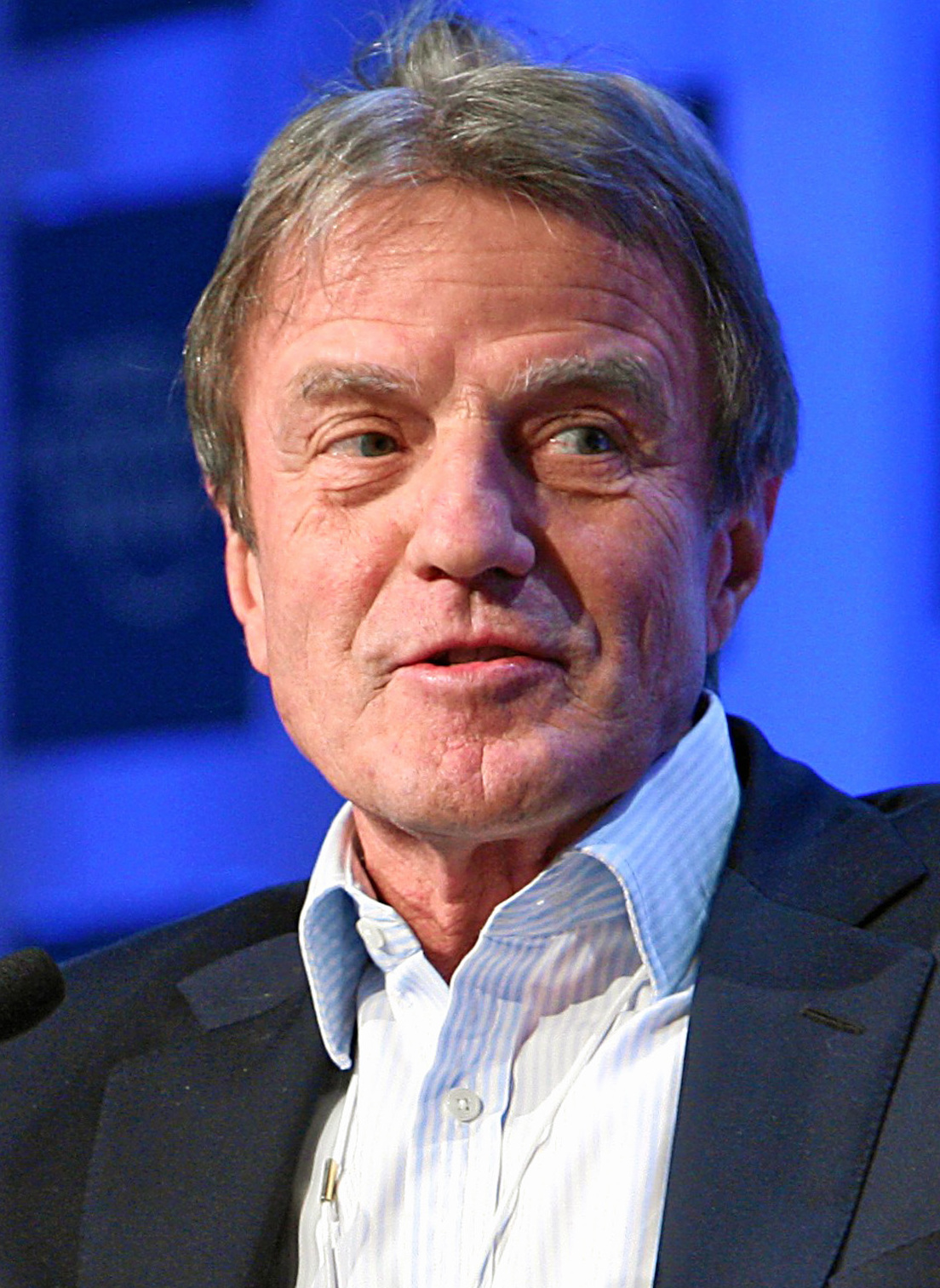
Bernard Kouchner, minister for human rights, proponent of the doctrine of the humanitarian intervention and fierce critic of the ministry.

In French political debate, the pejorative label « droit-de-l’hommisme » (literally “human-rights-ism”) is used by critics to describe what they see as a moralistic, advocacy-led foreign policy that places human-rights rhetoric ahead of strategic interests. The term resurfaced prominently in 2023 amid political attacks on the Ligue des droits de l’homme (LDH) and calls to scrutinise its funding, which the LDH answered by reaffirming a universalist defence of civil liberties and the rule of law. A recurrent line of critique holds that there is a “permanent contradiction” between an assertive, values-first stance and the conduct of state foreign policy, which must balance security, alliances and economic interests. This view was expressed in 2008 by Foreign Minister Bernard Kouchner, who publicly regretted the creation of a dedicated human-rights secretariat attached to his office — while his junior minister Rama Yade defended the record of the office and argued for pursuing both realism and rights. Kouchner described the creation of a State Secretariat for Human Rights as a “mistake”, citing a “permanent contradiction” between the defence of rights and the conduct of foreign policy, thereby triggering a public debate on the appropriateness of a dedicated portfolio. During the 2007 visit of Libya's Muammar Gaddafi, Rama Yade acknowledged the difficulty of reconciling commercial, security and diplomatic considerations with human-rights messaging, depicting French policy as walking on “two legs”: realpolitik and rights. For critics, such moments expose the limits of “rights-first” posturing; for defenders, they underline the need to keep rights on the agenda precisely in challenging contexts.

Commentators have argued that, from 2017, human rights became less central as a guiding frame for French external action, with the presidency favouring a pragmatic, case-by-case approach nested in broader goals (multilateralism, development, and global “public goods”). This shift was illustrated, for example, by the relatively low-key official marking of the 70th anniversary of the Universal Declaration of Human Rights at the Élysée Palace. Observers noted, from 2023–2024 onwards, President Emmanuel Macron's adoption of formulations found in far-right discourse — most notably décivilisation (“decivilisation”) and criticism of a supposed droit-de-l’hommisme. This lexical shift has been contested: some commentators argue that employing décivilisation popularises a historically loaded term open to multiple interpretations, while others emphasise its conceptual vagueness and the variability of its political uses.

Across 2024–2025, independent and UN bodies depict a mixed picture of human rights in France: robust national institutions and legal frameworks coexist with sustained concerns about civic-space pressures, border practices and remedies, detention conditions, discriminatory policing, and the long-term effects of exceptional security on ordinary law. According to France's National Consultative Commission on Human Rights (CNCDH), an independent body accredited to the UN which publishes an annual stocktake, 2024 required heightened vigilance around the rule of law and civic space (freedoms of expression, assembly and association), alongside work on tackling sexual and gender-based violence, prison overcrowding, and universal access to schooling. The commission also highlighted persistently high levels of racist and antisemitic acts. Its thematic 2024 report on racism, antisemitism and xenophobia notes historically high incident levels despite longer-term gains in tolerance indicators.

== Ambassador-at-large ==
In 2008, the responsibilities of the delegated ministry were entrusted to a new office-holder, the Ambassador-at-large for Human Rights. This decision to transfer human-rights promotion policy solely to the Ministry of Foreign Affairs came amid criticism of the post as a ministerial portfolio and followed Rama Yade's resignation. The diplomat and lawyer François Zimeray was appointed Ambassador for Human Rights by decree of President Nicolas Sarkozy. Notably, he had worked on drafting the Charter of Fundamental Rights of the European Union when he was an MEP in 1999. As ambassador, Zimeray spoke on France's behalf at the World Congress Against the Death Penalty and, in 2010, at the Kampala Review Conference on the International Criminal Court. In 2012, he chaired the forum on child soldiers held alongside the UN General Assembly. In autumn 2010, he set out the broad lines of his mandate as Ambassador for Human Rights:

“If one regards human rights as amounting to speeches, one confines us to the declaratory sphere… But if, on the contrary, diplomacy sets itself the aim of acting on reality and achieving concrete change, then one must accept the idea of action that is more discreet but no less determined, forgo our narcissistic desires (“France’s image”), and take the world as it is, with the ambition of helping to transform it. I must confess that, on accepting this position as Ambassador for Human Rights, I promised myself never to present us as “the” country of human rights. First, because this is historically debatable — other countries contributed before us to the conceptualisation of these rights — and because, even today, we have much to learn from others.”

In 2013, he was appointed by François Hollande as the new French Ambassador to Denmark and was succeeded by Patrizianna Sparacino, a career diplomat and inspector of foreign affairs. Ambassador for Human Rights from 2013 to 2017, Sparacino focused her mandate on women's rights and the universal abolition of the death penalty.

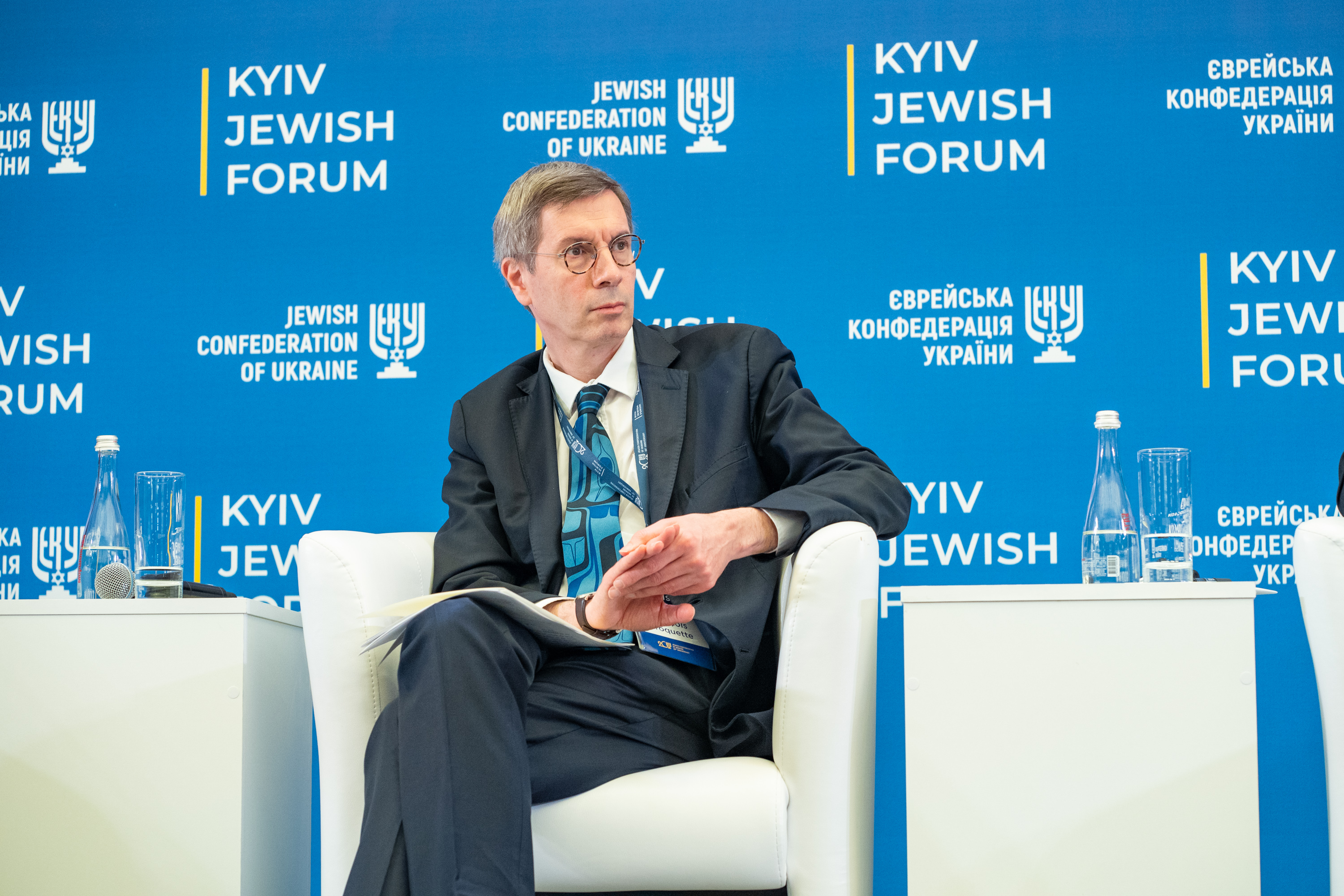
François Croquette, Human Rights Ambassador of France, 2019 Kyiv Jewish Forum.

As France's Ambassador for Human Rights (ambassador-at-large) from 2017, François Croquette coordinated the French human-rights diplomacy and, under a decree that also entrusted him with the international dimension of Holocaust remembrance and issues of spoliation, carried a universalist rights agenda in multilateral forums while liaising closely with NGOs (notably via the Plateforme Droits de l’Homme). He framed the role as a “diplomacy of conviction,” (diplomatie de conviction), emphasising support for civil society and the UN Universal Periodic Review, and rejecting any merely symbolic function. His substantive priorities included the global campaign for abolition of the death penalty and defence of LGBT+ rights — presenting the 2018 IDAHOT “Pour la Liberté” award to Alice Nkom and Mounir Baatour and delivering public messages on the International Day against Homophobia and Transphobia.

On 26 October 2022, the Ministry for Europe and Foreign Affairs announced the appointment of a new Ambassador-at-large for Human Rights, with a specific brief to promote LGBT+ rights: “The ambassador will be tasked with carrying France’s voice and action in this field, with the support of the entire French diplomatic network. They will reiterate France’s commitment to the universal decriminalisation of homosexuality and to the defence of the rights of LGBT+ people.”

In the spring of 2025, after Hungarian Prime Minister Viktor Orbán banned the Budapest Pride parade, the Ministry for Europe and Foreign Affairs issued a joint communiqué with the Ministry for Equality between Women and Men condemning the ban:

“In France, in Europe and across the world, these marches are a reminder that these rights are the fruit of collective struggles against discrimination, criminalisation, pathologisation and violence… Everywhere, reactionary and fundamentalist offensives seek to restrict equality and erase people’s very existence. What can be won through struggle can be destroyed through inaction. Faced with this global threat, visibility, international solidarity and commitment are more indispensable than ever. Respect for and protection of human rights must apply everywhere, at all times, and for everyone. Under no circumstances can LGBT+ citizens be an exception to this fundamental principle, on which France will never compromise.”

The Foreign Ministry tasked Jean-Marc Berthon with attending the Budapest Pride parade to represent France symbolically, prompting sharp criticism from the Hungarian government.

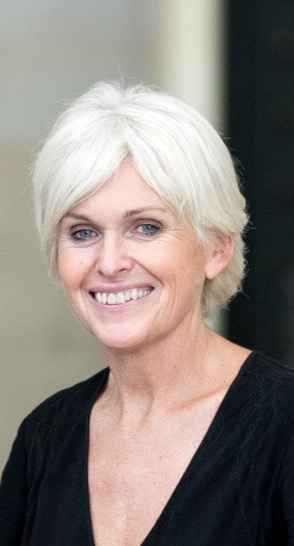
Current ambassador-at-large Isabelle Lonvis-Rome.

Since May 2024, the current ambassador has been Isabelle Lonvis-Rome, a magistrate by profession, former Inspector-General of Justice, and former Minister Delegate for Equality between Women and Men, Diversity and Equal Opportunities in Élisabeth Borne's government (May 2022–July 2023). She is also active in civil society, notably through the Rhône Committee for the Reception of Refugees and Asylum Seekers and the association ‘Femmes de Liberté’, which she co-founded. In her capacity as ambassador with specific responsibility for combating antisemitism, she took part in the inaugural French-American Dialogue on Countering Antisemitism in Paris in autumn 2024 alongside Deborah Lipstadt, the US Special Envoy to Monitor and Combat Antisemitism, following the initiative announced at the meeting between President Joe Biden and President Emmanuel Macron. The communiquė affirms that antisemitism threatens not only Jewish people but also democracy and social cohesion, and commit to intensified bilateral cooperation to combat it: the statement situates the dialogue within a broader, ongoing French–American effort to coordinate policies and share practices

== Holders ==
- May 1986 — May 1988: Claude Malhuret
- 30 March 1993 — 11 May 1995: Lucette Michaux-Chevry
- 18 May 1995 — 2 June 1997: Xavier Emmanuelli (as Secretary of State attached to the Prime Minister, with responsibility for Emergency Humanitarian Relief)
- May 2007 — 23 June 2009 : Rama Yade (as Secretary of State to the Minister for Europe and Foreign Affairs, responsible for Human Rights)
- 13 February 2008 — 25 February 2013 : François Zimeray, appointed by President Nicolas Sarkozy (as Ambassador-at-large for Human Rights and for Remembrance, with responsibility for the international dimension of the Shoah and for issues of spoliation)
- 25 February 2013 — 15 February 2017 : Patrizianna Sparacino, appointed by President François Hollande
- 15 February 2017 — 4 August 2022 : François Croquette, appointed by President Emmanuel Macron
- 4 August 2022 — 21 May 2024: Jean-Marc Berthon appointed by President Emmanuel Macron (as Ambassador-at-large for LGBT+ Rights, on the recommendation of Foreign Minister Catherine Colonna)
- 21 May 2024—: Isabelle Lonvis-Rome, appointed by President Emmanuel Macron
