= 2004 Aquitaine regional election =

← 1998	21 March 2004 (first round); 28 March 2004 (second round)	2010 →

All 85 seats in the Regional Council of Aquitaine
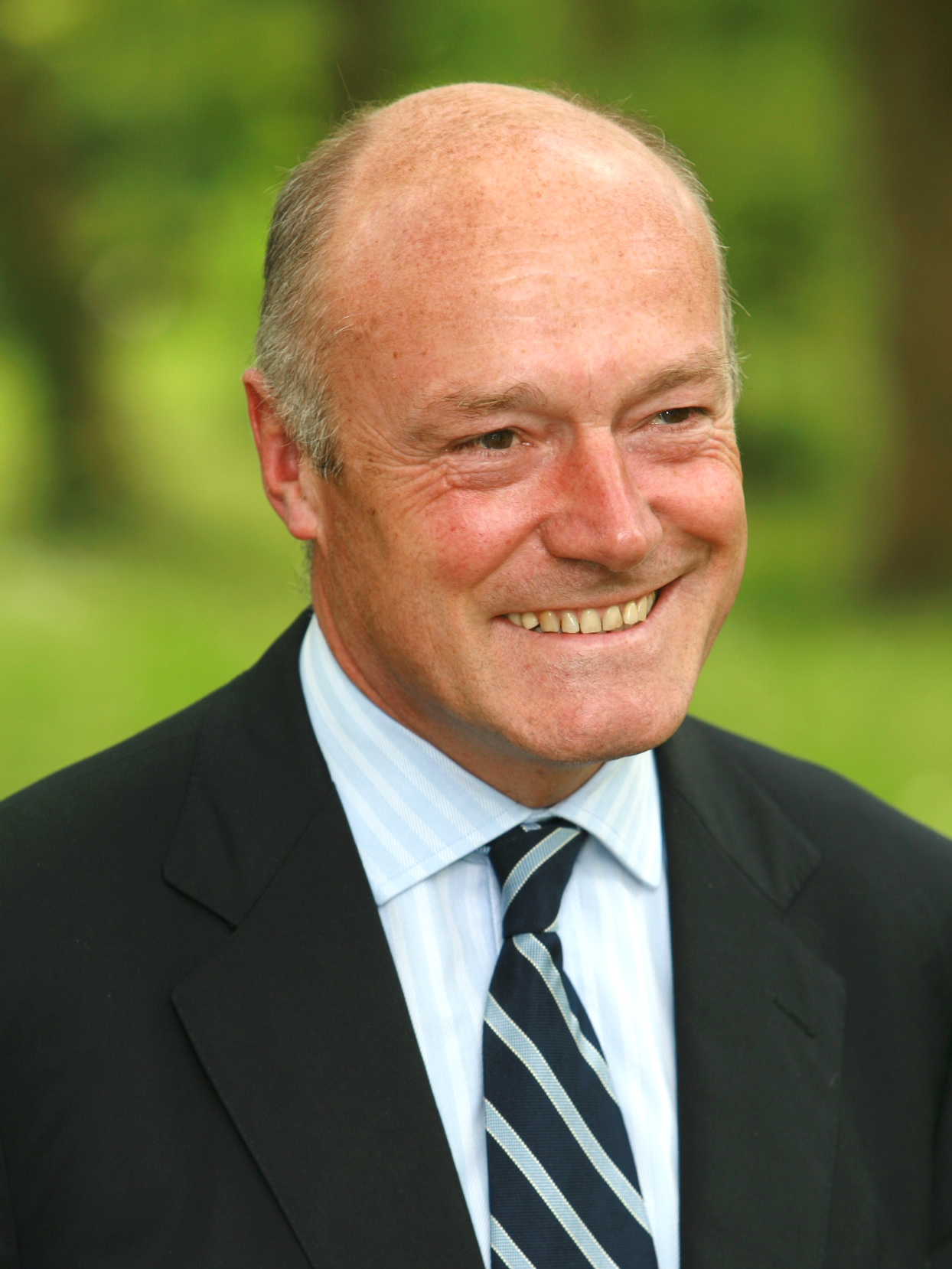

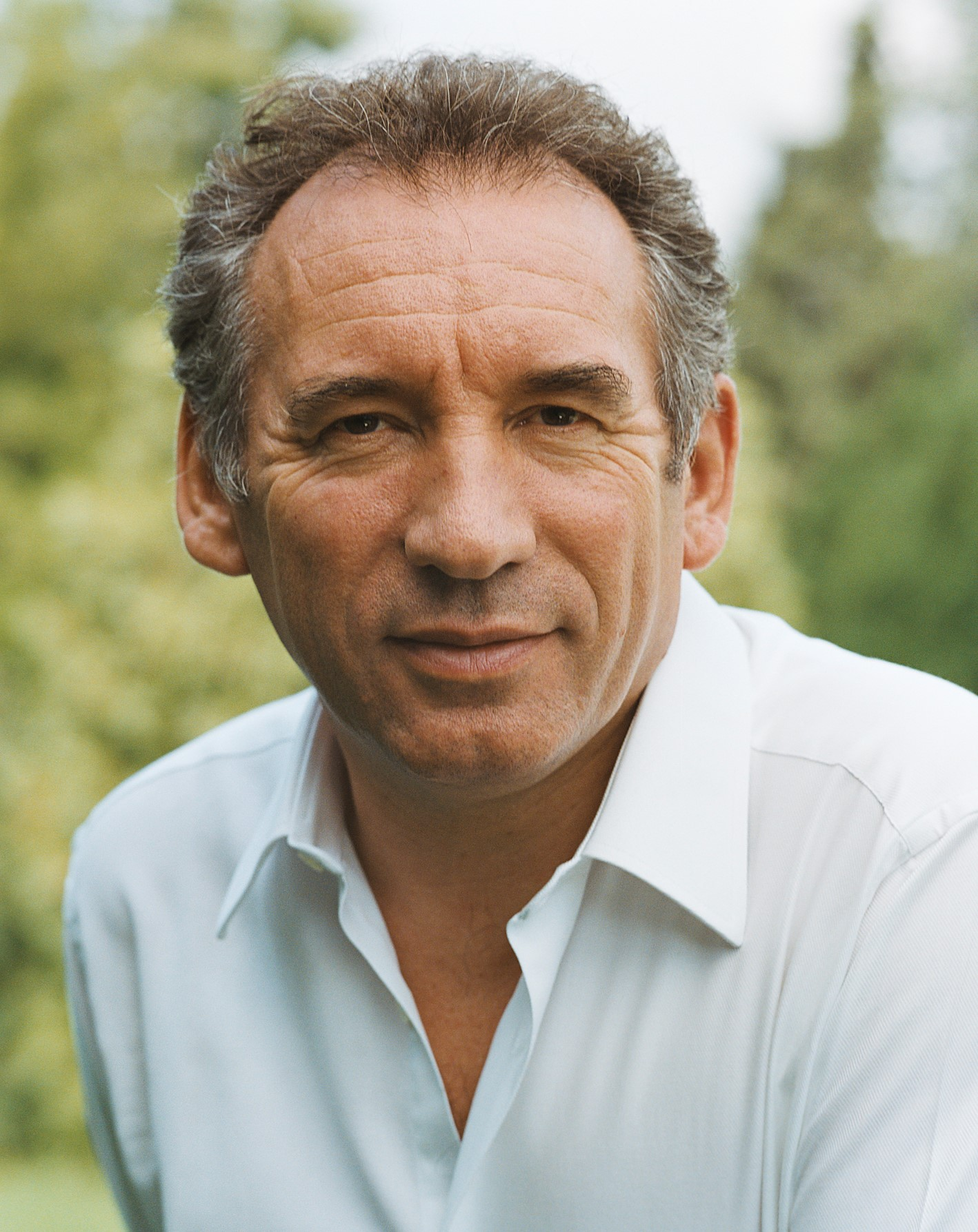
	First party	Second party	Third party
Leader	Alain Rousset	Xavier Darcos	François Bayrou
Party	PS	UMP	UDF
Seats won	57	21	7
Popular vote	769,893	469,386	163,731
Percentage	54.87%	33.46%	11.67%

A regional election took place in Aquitaine on 21 March and 28 March 2004, along with all other regions. Alain Rousset (PS) was re-elected President of the Council.

== Results ==
Party	Presidential candidate	First round		Second round		Seats
Party	Presidential candidate	Votes	%	Votes	%	Seats
Socialist Party	Alain Rousset	516,392	38.42	769,893	54.87	57
Union for a Popular Movement	Xavier Darcos	247,232	18.40	469,386	33.46	21
Union for French Democracy	François Bayrou	215,796	16.06	163,731	11.67	7
National Front	Jacques Colombier	153,859	11.45			0
Hunting, Fishing, Nature and Traditions	Jean Saint-Josse	96,925	7.21			0
PCF–MRC	Annie Guilhamet	58,485	4.35			0
LCR–LO	Martine Malfert	55,215	4.11			0
Total		1,343,904	100.00	1,403,010	100.00	85
Valid votes		1,343,904	95.07	1,403,010	95.37	
Invalid/blank votes		69,723	4.93	68,120	4.63	
Total votes		1,413,627	100.00	1,471,130	100.00	
Registered voters/turnout		2,138,102	66.12	2,138,055	68.81	
Source: Ministry of the Interior, Delwit
