= Frédéric Zgainski =

French politician

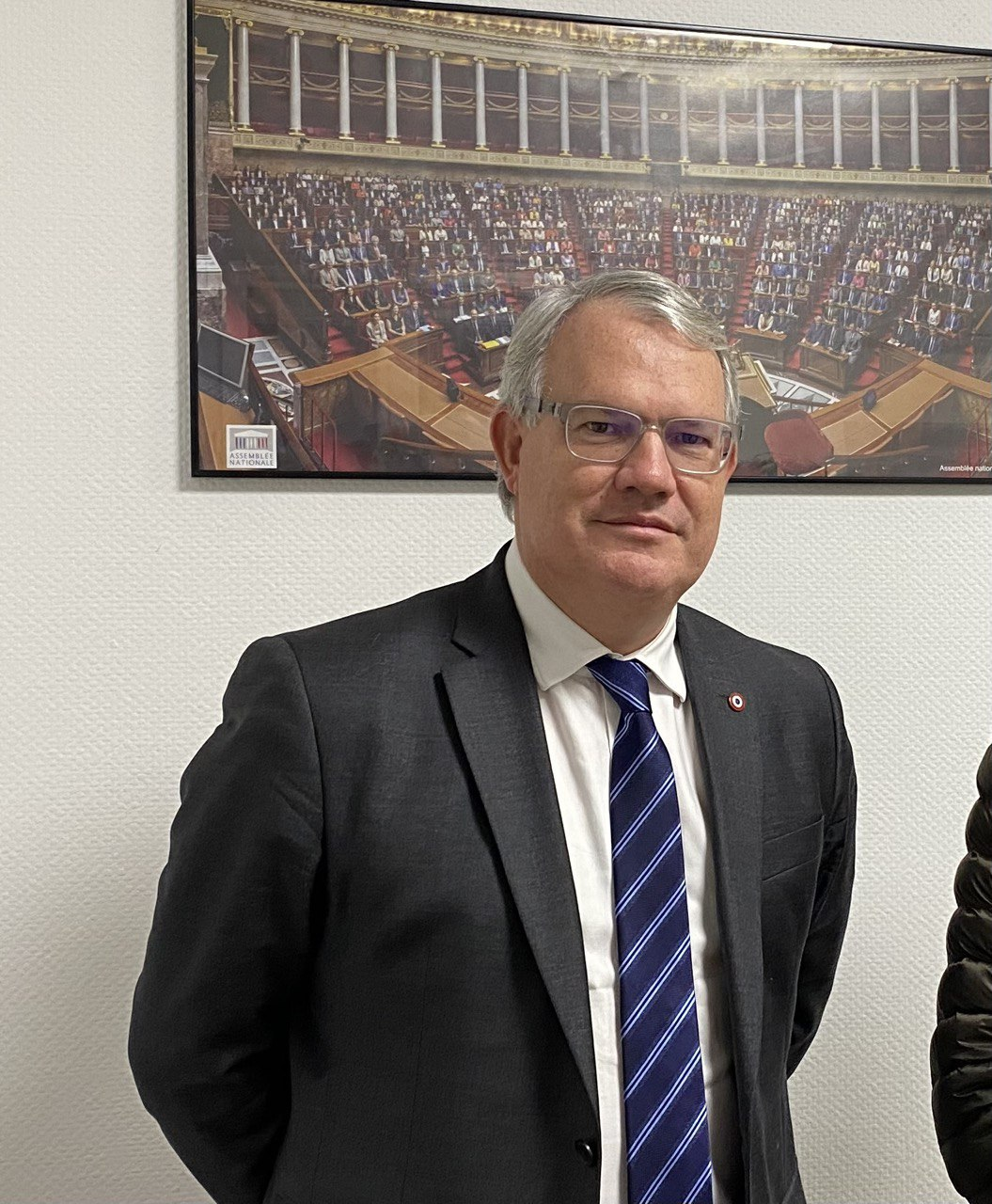
- Frédéric Zgainski in 2022

Municipal councillor of Cestas
- Incumbent
- Assumed office 30 April 2014
- Mayor: Pierre Ducout

Member of the National Assembly for Gironde's 7th constituency
- In office 5 August 2022 – 9 February 2024
- Preceded by: Bérangère Couillard
- Succeeded by: Bérangère Couillard

Personal details
- Born: 30 October 1972 (age 54) Lyon, France
- Party: MoDem
- Children: 2
- Education: École des Mines de Nantes; University of Lorraine

Frédéric Zgainski (born 30 October 1972) is a French politician and member of the MoDem party. He is deputy for the seventh constituency of Gironde, as a substitute for Bérangère Couillard, appointed to the Élisabeth Borne government.

== Biography ==
Frédéric Zgainski was born on 30 October 1972 in Lyon, France, the son of a teacher. His grandfather was a Polish miner.

A graduate of the École des Mines de Nantes and the Institut d'administration des entreprises de l'Université de Nancy, he is president of a consulting firm and of a company specializing in the design, installation and maintenance of equipment used for waste sorting and packaging.

Frédéric Zgainski is married with two children, and lives in Gazinet in the commune of Cestas.

=== Political career ===
Frédéric Zgainski has been a member of the MoDem since the party's inception, and was elected to head the "Construisons ensemble Cestas 2020" list for the 2014 municipal elections. The results of the opposition list, supported by the UMP, UDI and Modem, enabled him to be elected Cestas town councillor, then community councillor for Jalle Eau Bourde.

In the 2020 municipal elections, he led the "Demain Cestas" list supported by LREM and MoDem. The results obtained enabled him to serve a second term as opposition municipal councillor and community councillor.

In the 2022 legislative elections in Gironde, Frédéric Zgainski was the deputy for Bérangère Couillard, the victorious candidate for re-election in the 7th constituency. Following Bérangère Couillard's appointment to the Élisabeth Borne government on 4 July 2022, Frédéric Zgainski became deputy for Gironde's 7th constituency. He took office on 5 August 2022.

He joins the Democrat, MoDem and Independents group.
