= Château de Laurenzane =

Town hall in Gradignan, France

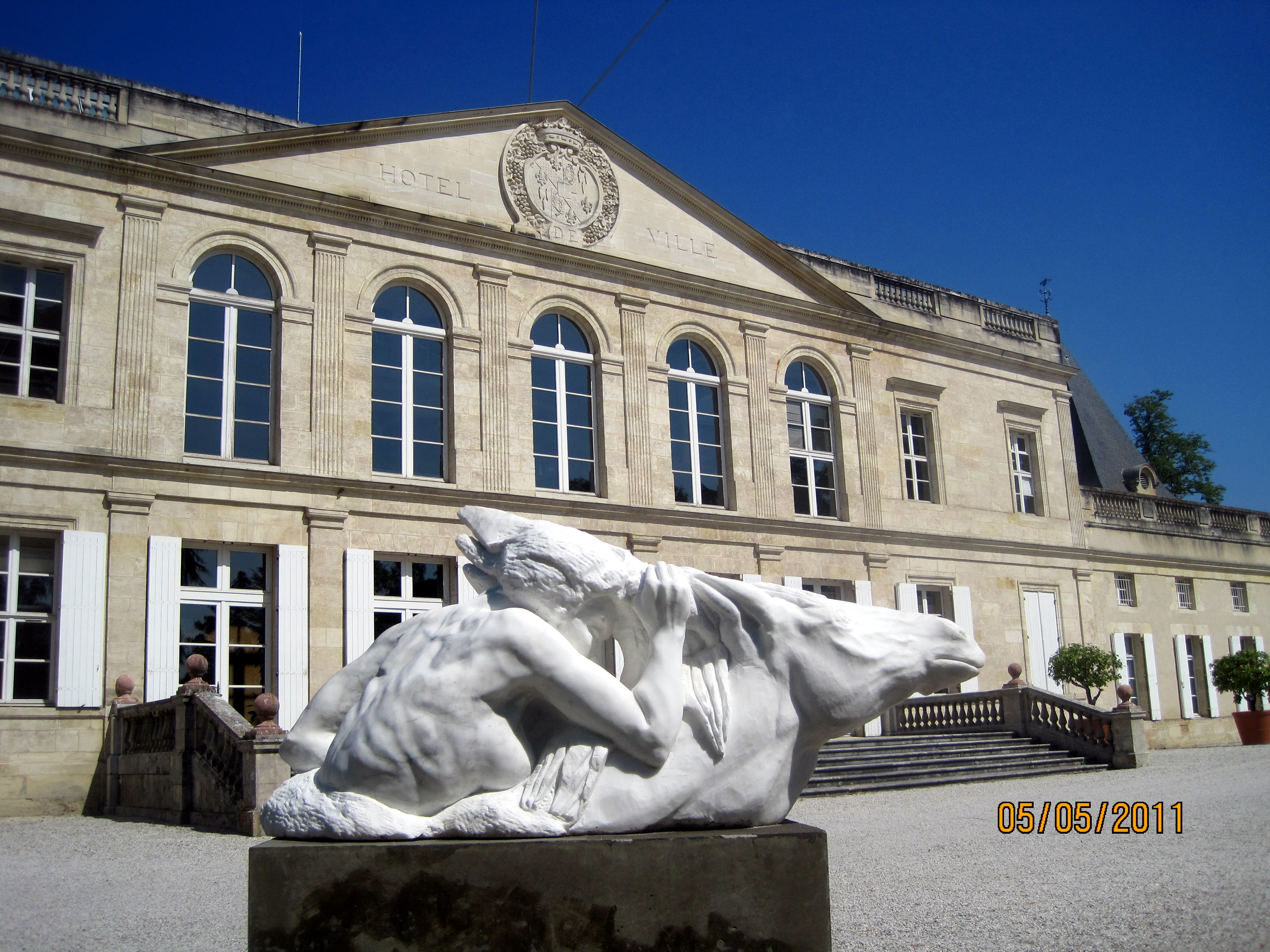
- The main frontage of the Château de Fromont in May 2011
- Interactive map of the Château de Laurenzane area

General information
- Type: City hall
- Architectural style: Neoclassical style
- Location: Gradignan, France
- Coordinates: 44.7725°N 0.6083°W
- Completed: 1752

The Château de Laurenzane (French pronunciation: [otɛl də vil] is a municipal building in Gradignan, Gironde, in southwestern France, standing on Allée Gaston Rodrigues.

== History ==
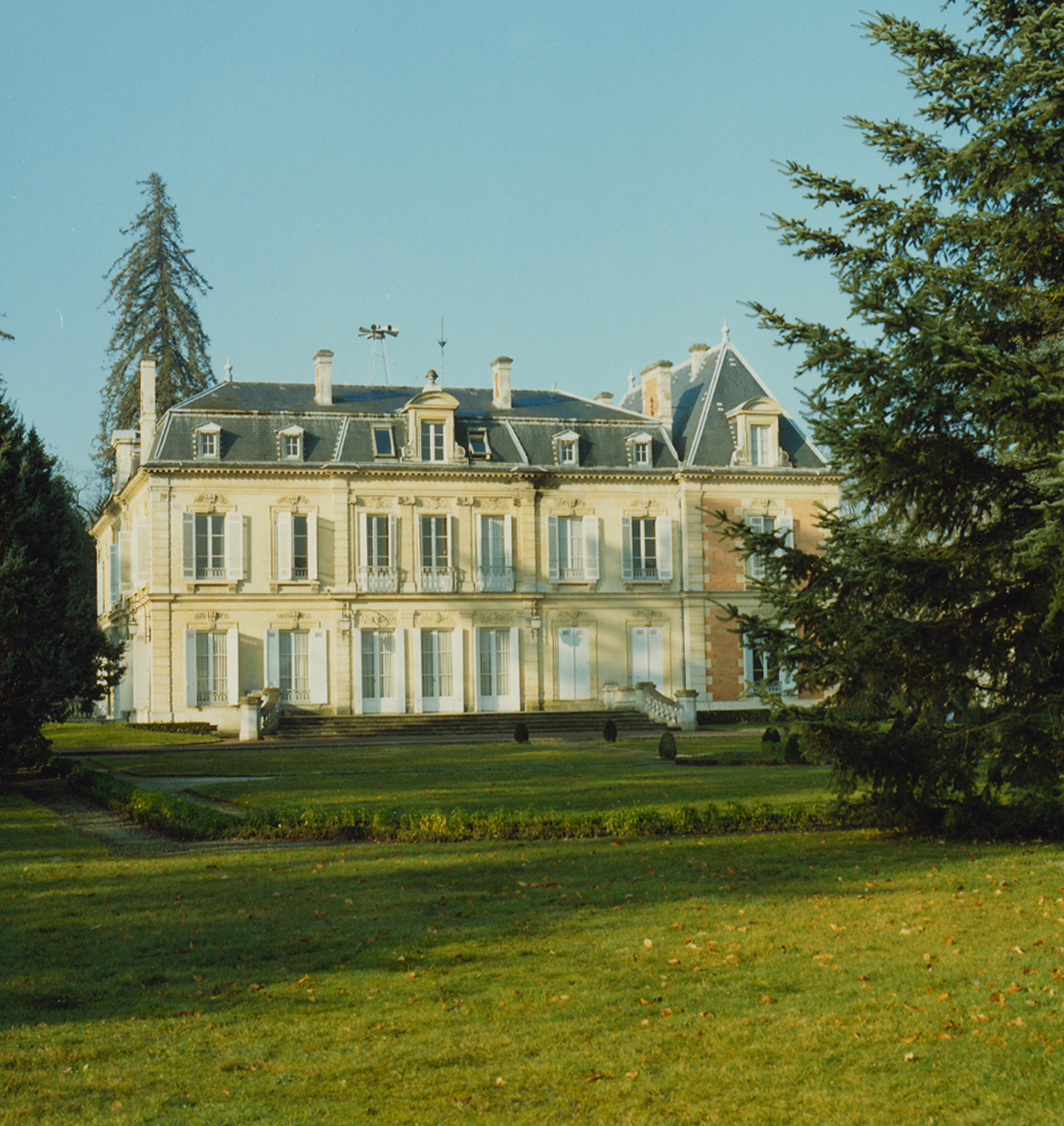
Château de l'Ermitage

Following the French Revolution, the town council initially met in the house of the mayor at the time. This arrangement continued until the mid-19th century when the council commissioned a dedicated town hall in the town square (later Place de la Mairie). The new building was designed in the neoclassical style and built in ashlar stone. The design involved a symmetrical main frontage of five bays facing onto the square. The central bay featured a square-headed doorway on the ground floor and a casement window on the first floor. The other bays were fenestrated in a similar style and the central three bays were flanked by rusticated pilasters.

After the Second World War, the council decided to move to a more substantial property. The building they selected was the Château de l'Ermitage on Avenue Jean Larrieu. The château was built on the site of an old convent which had been managed by the Augustinians. After the French Revolution, the building was seized by the state and the monks driven out. A Bordeaux merchant, Joseph Dabrahan Julian, acquired the convent, instructed its demolition and commissioned the Château de l'Ermitage. It was designed in the neoclassical style, built in a mix of brick and ashlar stone and was completed in around 1795. It was acquired by another merchant, Maxime Lévy, in 1865, and, after Lévy had enlarged and refurbished the building a year later, it was bought by the Bosc family in 1901. It was the Bosc family that agreed to sell it to the council in 1946. After the council moved out, the building continued to accommodate the Salle des Mariages (wedding room) for many years. A major programme of refurbishment, enabling it to operate as a business centre, was completed at a cost of €5 million in June 2024.

In the mid-1980s, following significant population growth, the council decided to move to an even larger property. The building they selected was Château de Laurenzane on Allée Gaston Rodrigues. The building was commissioned by the local seigneur, Sieur de Pourcin, in around 1752. It was acquired by a lawyer at the Court of Appeal in Bordeaux, Gaston Rodrigues-Henriques, in 1880, and, by 1920, had passed to his heir, Madame Veuve Gaston Rodrigues-Henriques (née Dubreuil). After a major fire engulfed the building in 1986, it was acquired by the council, restored and converted for municipal use.

The design involved a symmetrical main frontage of 21 bays facing southeast across a large garden towards Rue de Moulineau. The building was laid out with a two-storey main block of nine bays and a pair of single storey wings of six bays each. The original 18th century design involved a steep Châteauesque-style roof but this was replaced, in 1986, by a neoclassical-style pediment across the central five bays. Internally, the main room was the Salle du Conseil (council chamber).

The garden now incorporates a fine greenhouse which was designed by Gustave Eiffel for the Universal Exhibition and completed in 1878. It was acquired by Napoleon III and given to Lucien Arman, who owned Château Malleret in Cadaujac, in recognition of Arman's hospitality to the emperor. It was abandoned in 1979, recovered by the mayor of Gradignan, René Canivenc, and restored by the people of Gradignan. The garden also contains 20 bronze and marble statues sculpted by Danielle Bigata between 1992 and 2007.
