= Bérangère Couillard =

French politician

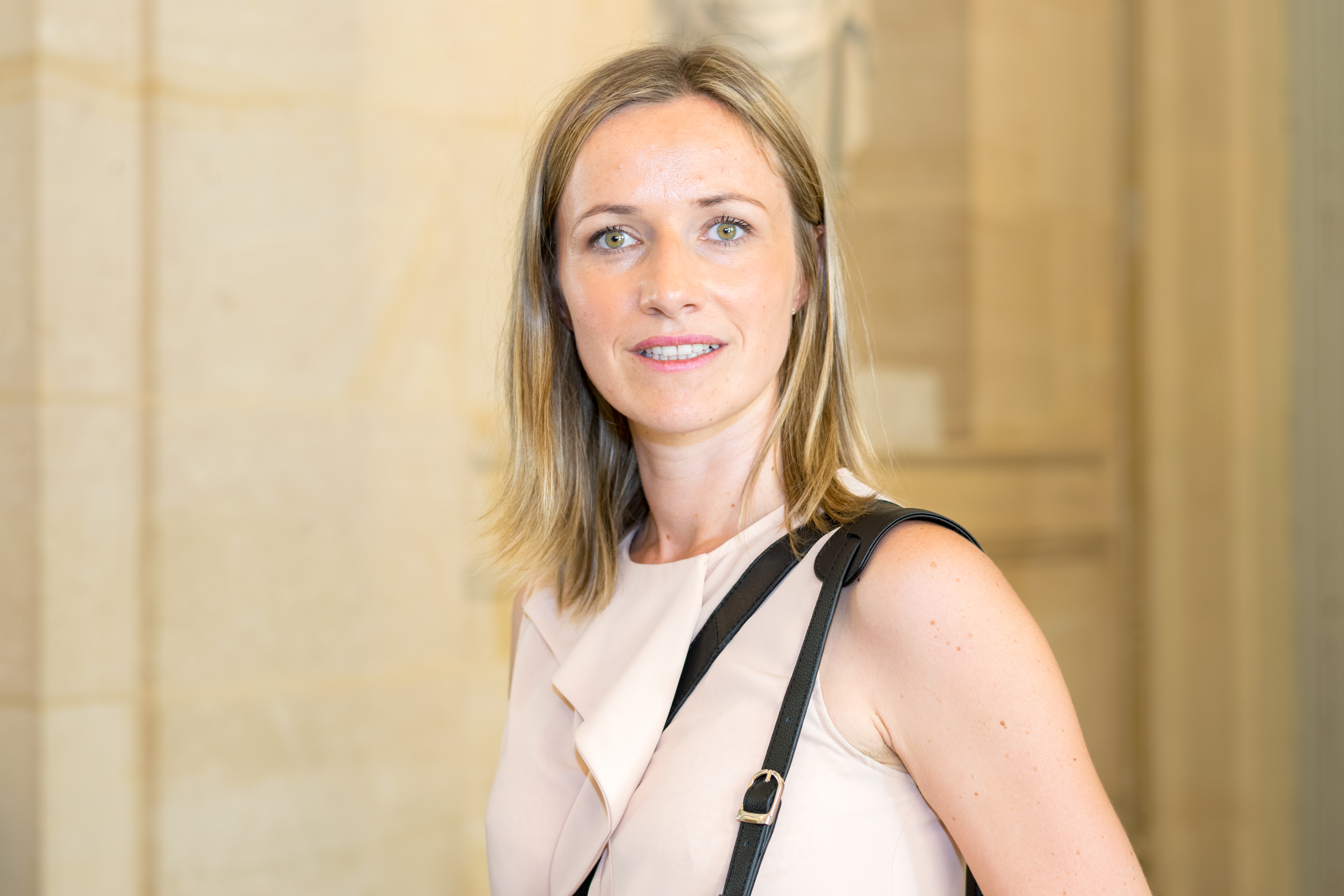
- Bérangère Couillard in 2017

Member of the National Assembly for Gironde's 6th constituency
- In office 10 February 2024 – 9 June 2024
- Preceded by: Frédéric Zgainski
- Succeeded by: Sébastien Saint-Pasteur
- In office 21 June 2017 – 4 July 2022
- Preceded by: Alain Rousset
- Succeeded by: Frédéric Zgainski

Minister for Gender Equality and fight against discriminations
- In office 20 July 2023 – 11 January 2024
- Prime Minister: Élisabeth Borne
- Preceded by: Isabelle Lonvis-Rome
- Succeeded by: Aurore Bergé

Secretary of State for Ecology
- In office 4 July 2022 – 20 July 2023
- Prime Minister: Élisabeth Borne
- Preceded by: Bérangère Abba (Biodiversity)
- Succeeded by: Sarah El Haïry (Biodiversity)

Personal details
- Born: 24 July 1986 (age 40) Rennes, France
- Party: Renaissance
- Education: University of Rennes 1 Institut d'Administration des Entreprises

Bérangère Couillard (French pronunciation: [beʁɑ̃ʒɛʁ kujaʁ]; born 24 July 1986) is a French politician of Renaissance (RE) who served as Minister for Gender Equality and Fight against discriminations in the government of Prime Minister Élisabeth Borne from 2023 to 2024.

Couillard previously served as State Secretary for Ecology in Borne's government from 2022 to 2023. From the 2017 elections to 2022, she was a member of the French National Assembly, representing the department of Gironde.

== Early life and education ==
Originally from Rennes, Couillard studied in Brittany, Paris and Ireland.

== Political career ==
In the National Assembly, Couillard served as member of the Committee on Sustainable Development and Spatial Planning. In addition to her committee assignments, she represented the parliament on the Higher Council for Energy (CSE). Within her parliamentary group, she co-chaired (alongside Guillaume Gouffier-Cha) a working group on fighting domestic violence.

== Political positions ==
In April 2018, Couillard joined other co-signatories around Sébastien Nadot in officially filing a request for a commission of inquiry into the legality of French weapons sales to the Saudi-led coalition fighting in Yemen, days before an official visit of Saudi Crown Prince Mohammed bin Salman to Paris.

In May 2018, Couillard co-sponsored an initiative in favour of legalizing assisted reproductive technology (ART) for all women (singles, heterosexual couples or lesbian couples).

In July 2019, Couillard voted in favor of the French ratification of the European Union's Comprehensive Economic and Trade Agreement (CETA) with Canada.
