= Motte Saint-Albe =

Hill in France that previously held a castle

Coordinates: 44.7691°N 0.6277°W

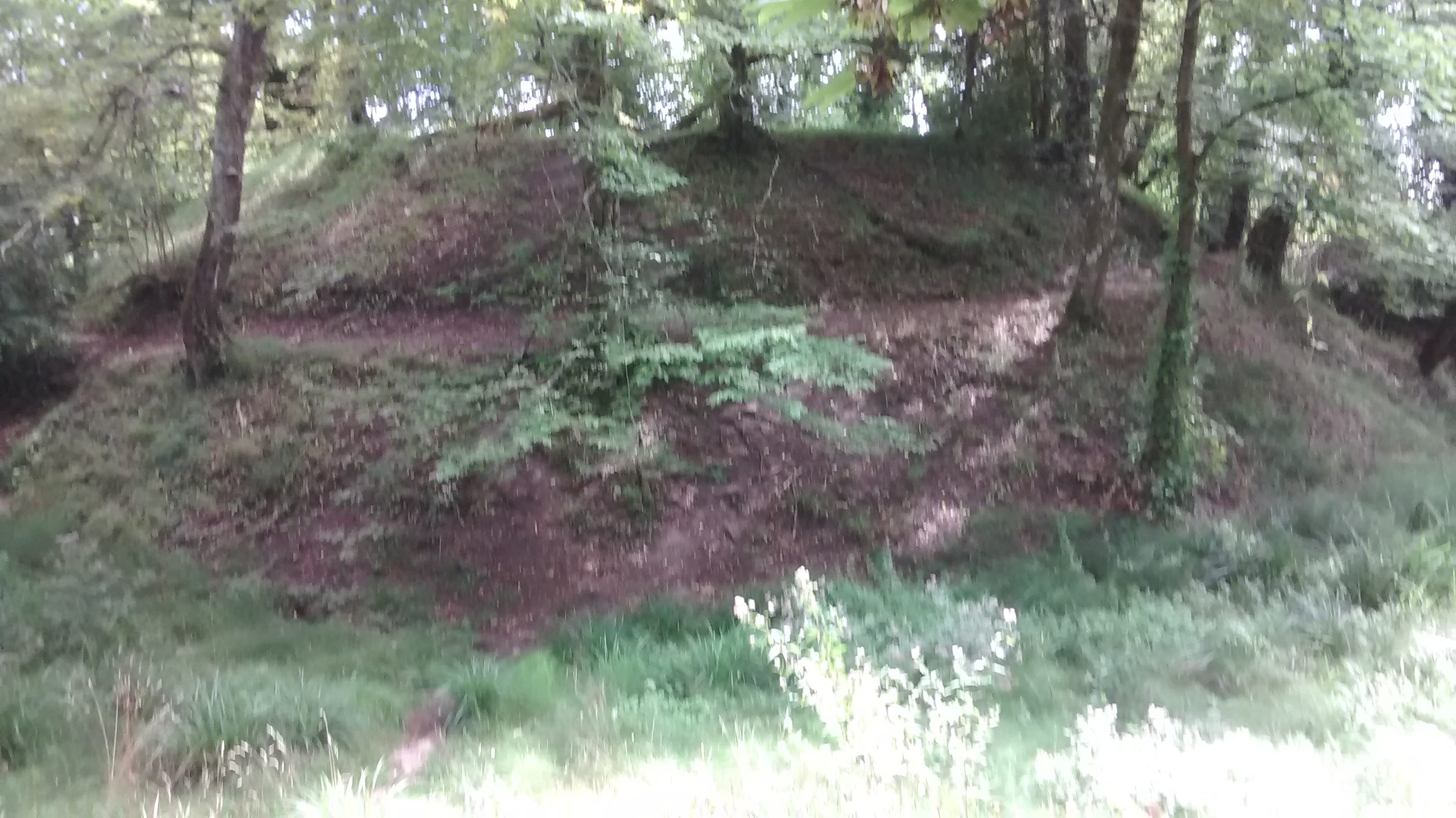
Vesige of Motte Saint-Albe, Gradignan, France

Motte Saint-Albe is a medieval castle hill in Gradignan, Gironde, Nouvelle-Aquitaine, France. Built at the end of the 11th century, nothing remains of the castle or tower that was situated on the motte. The motte has a 30 metre diameter at the base is 7 metres tall. It is surrounded by a ditch and a vallum.
