= Gradignan =

- Commune
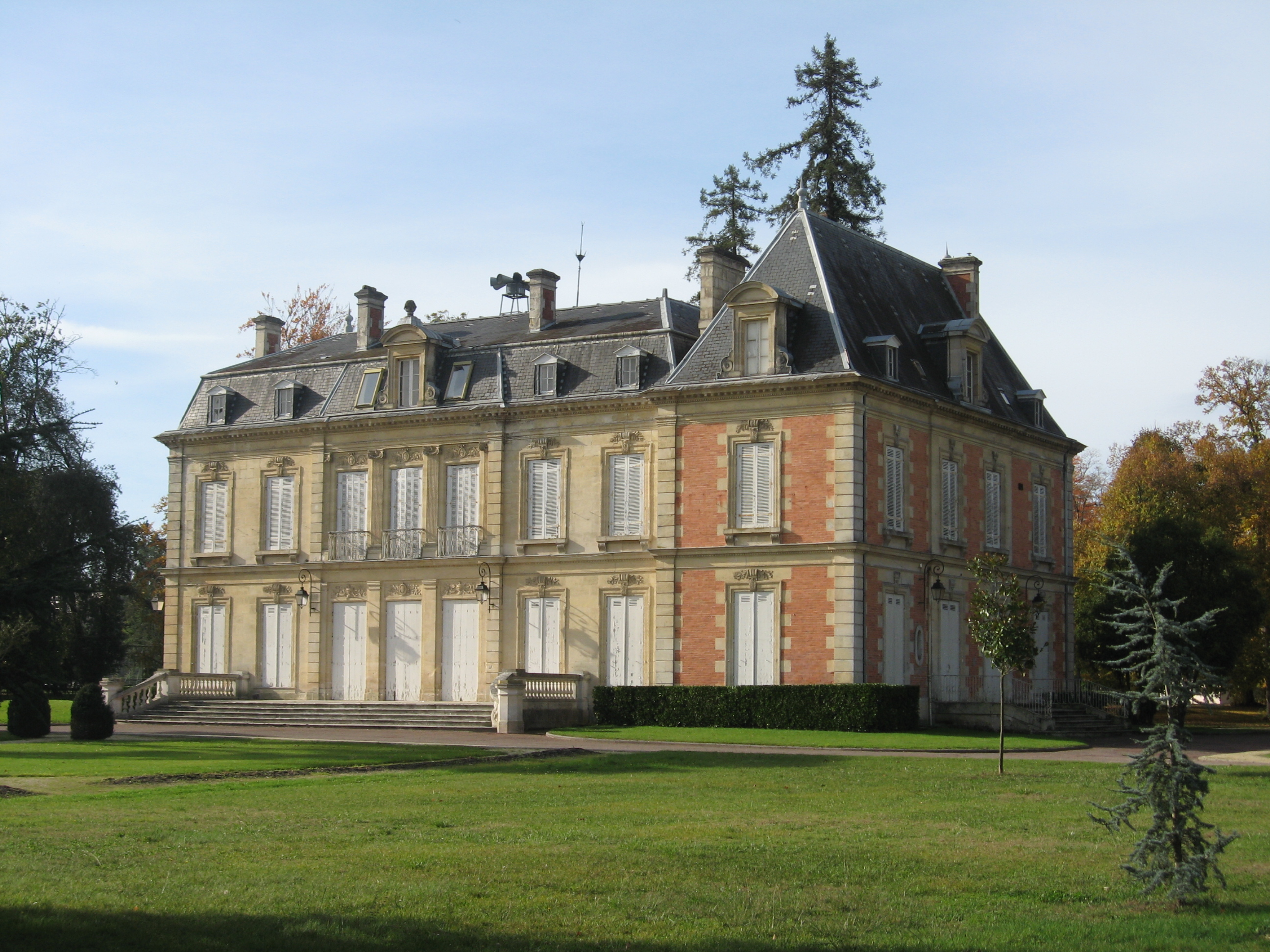
- The Hermitage chateau

- Coat of arms
- Location of Gradignan
- Location within France Location within Nouvelle-Aquitaine
- Coordinates: 44°46′21″N 0°36′56″W
- Country: France
- Region: Nouvelle-Aquitaine
- Department: Gironde
- Arrondissement: Bordeaux
- Canton: Pessac-2
- Intercommunality: Bordeaux Métropole

Government
  - Mayor (2020–2026): Michel Labardin
- Area^{1}: 15.77 km^{2} (6.09 sq mi)
- Elevation: 26 m (85 ft)
- Highest elevation: 51 m (167 ft)
- Lowest elevation: 10 m (33 ft)
- Population (2023): 26,952
  - Density: 1,709/km^{2} (4,426/sq mi)
- Time zone: UTC+01:00 (CET)
  - Summer (DST): UTC+02:00 (CEST)
- INSEE/Postal code: 33192 /33170
- ^{1} French Land Register data, which excludes lakes, ponds, glaciers > 1 km^{2} (0.386 sq mi or 247 acres) and river estuaries.

Gradignan (French pronunciation: [ɡʁadiɲɑ̃]; Gascon: Gradinhan) is a commune in the Gironde department in southwestern France.

It is a suburb of the city of Bordeaux and is located on its southwest side. Thus, it is a member of the Bordeaux Métropole.

== History ==
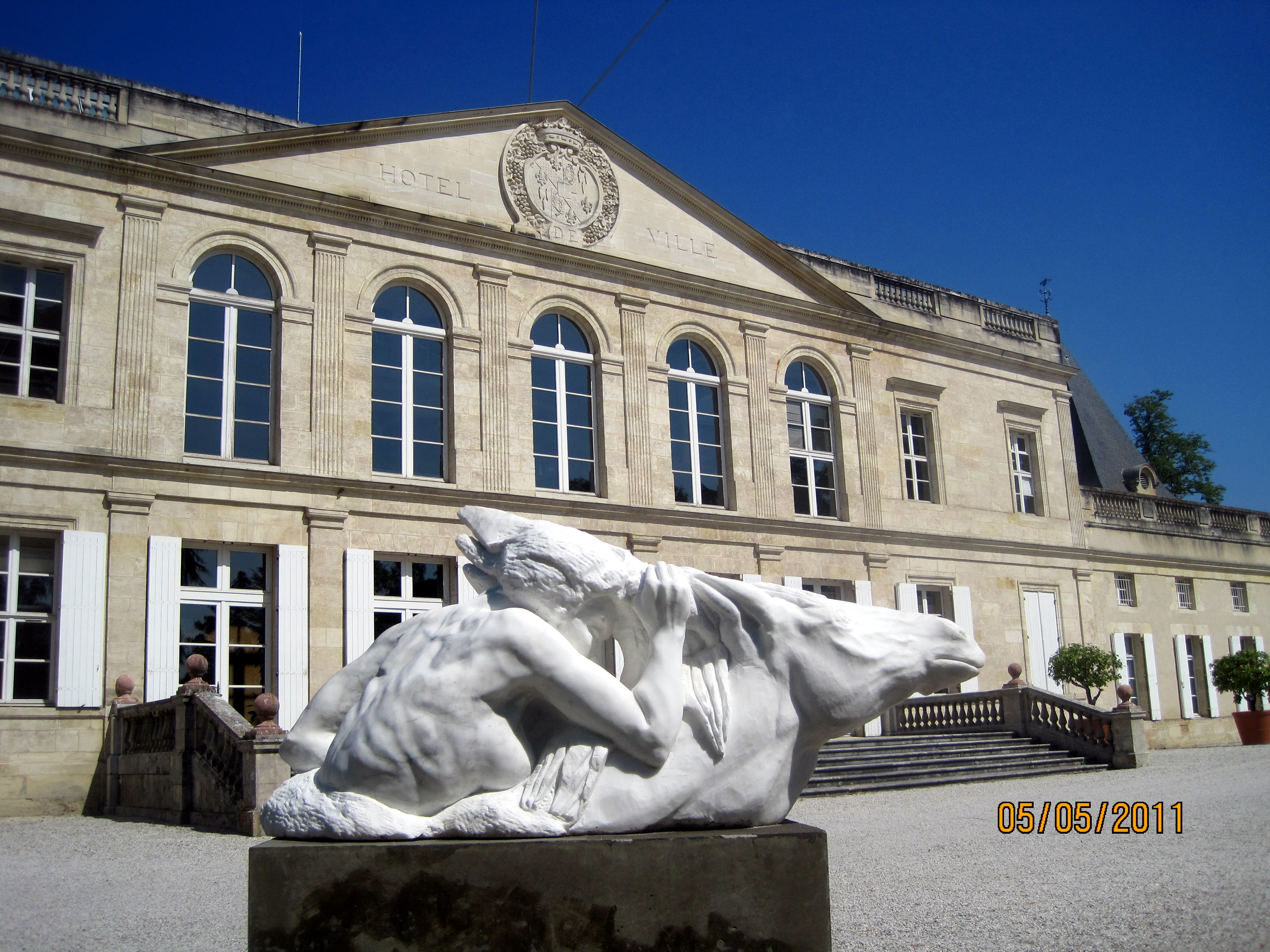
The Château de Laurenzane

The Château de Laurenzane, which currently serves as the town hall, dates back to 1752.

== Population ==
Historical population

Year	Pop.	±% p.a.
1793	1,860	—
1800	1,382	−4.15%
1806	1,461	+0.93%
1821	1,487	+0.12%
1831	1,630	+0.92%
1836	1,643	+0.16%
1841	1,727	+1.00%
1846	1,843	+1.31%
1851	1,867	+0.26%
1856	1,834	−0.36%
1861	1,989	+1.64%
1866	2,079	+0.89%
1872	2,269	+1.47%
1876	2,377	+1.17%
1881	2,453	+0.63%
1886	2,672	+1.73%
1891	2,727	+0.41%
1896	2,818	+0.66%
1901	2,853	+0.25%

Year	Pop.	±% p.a.
1906	2,945	+0.64%
1911	2,895	−0.34%
1921	2,982	+0.30%
1926	3,180	+1.29%
1931	3,314	+0.83%
1936	3,418	+0.62%
1946	5,213	+4.31%
1954	4,807	−1.01%
1962	6,803	+4.44%
1968	10,402	+7.33%
1975	18,691	+8.73%
1982	21,441	+1.98%
1990	21,727	+0.17%
1999	22,193	+0.24%
2007	23,096	+0.50%
2012	23,930	+0.71%
2017	25,552	+1.32%
2023	26,952	+0.89%

Source: EHESS and INSEE (1968-2023)

== Education institutions ==
Gradignan is a part of the Bordeaux education zone (Académie de Bordeaux).

List of the educational establishments.
Kindergarten
- Ermitage
- La Clairière
- Lange
- Saint-Géry
- Les Tourelles
- Malartic
- Le Pin Franc
Primary schools
- Saint-Exupéry
- Lange
- Saint-Géry
- Martinon
- Malartic
- Le Pin Franc
Middle schools
- Collège Fontaines de Monjous
- Collège Alfred Mauguin
High schools
- Lycée des Graves
Universities & higher education
- ENITA
- IUT de Bordeaux 1

== Prison ==
Gradignan prison is a high-security facility serving the Bordeaux area.

== International relations ==
Gradignan has partnerships with:

- Pfungstadt, Germany, since 1996.
- Figueira da Foz, Portugal, since 1992.

== Localities ==
- Communes of the Gironde department
- Motte Saint-Albe
