= Gironde's 7th constituency =

Constituency of the National Assembly of France

7th constituency of Gironde
- inline Constituency of the National Assembly of France

- Location of constituency in Department

- Location of Gironde in France
- Deputy: Sébastien Saint-Pasteur; PS
- Department: Gironde
- Cantons: (pre-2015) Gradignan, La Brède, Pessac I, Pessac II.

The 7th constituency of the Gironde (French: Septième circonscription de la Gironde) is a French legislative constituency in Gironde département. Like the other 576 French constituencies, it elects one MP using the two-round system, with a run-off if no candidate receives over 50% of the vote in the first round.

Election	Member	Party
1988	Pierre Ducout	PS
1993	Pierre Ducout	PS
1997	Pierre Ducout	PS
2002	Pierre Ducout	PS
2007	Alain Rousset	PS
2012	Alain Rousset	PS
2017	Bérangère Couillard	LREM
2022	Bérangère Couillard	RE
2024	Sébastien Saint-Pasteur	PS

== Election results ==
=== 2024 ===
Candidate	Party	Alliance	First round			Second round		
Candidate	Party	Alliance	Votes	%	+/–	Votes	%	+/–
Sébastien Saint-Pasteur	PS	NFP	21,913	38.50	+3.99	24,810	43.82	-3.47
Bérangère Couillard	REN	Ensemble	18,854	33.12	-3.15	19,164	33.85	-18.86
Clémence Naveys-Dumas	RN		12,766	22.43	+10.75	12,644	22.33	new
Ousmane Thiam	EAC		1,597	2.81	new			
Christelle Cotton	DIV		760	1.34	new			
Dominique De Witte	REC		589	1.03	-2.43			
Monique Oratto	LO		442	0.78	-0.25			
Votes			56,921	100.00		56,618	100.00	
Valid votes			56,921	97.92	0.09	56,618	97.81	+3.68
Blank votes			832	1.43	-0.05	894	1.54	-2.44
Null votes			376	0.65	-0.14	376	0.65	-1.25
Turnout			58,129	72.04	+18.25	57,888	71.74	+18.77
Abstentions			22,563	27.96	-18.25	22,808	28.26	-18.77
Registered voters			80,692			80,696		
Result			PS GAIN FROM RE					

=== 2022 ===
Legislative Election 2022: Gironde's 7th constituency
Party	Candidate	Votes	%	±%
LREM (Ensemble)	Bérangère Couillard	15,252	36.27	-2.74
LFI (NUPÉS)	Jean-Renaud Ferran	14,513	34.51	-0.56
RN	Francine Erb	4,914	11.68	+4.82
LR (UDC)	Benoît Rautureau	2,864	6.81	−5.59
REC	Dany Bonnet	1,455	3.46	N/A
DIV	Audrey Legendre	1,329	3.16	N/A
Others	N/A	1,730	4.11	
Turnout		42,057	53.79	−0.38
2nd round result
LREM (Ensemble)	Bérangère Couillard	20,964	52.71	-2.99
LFI (NUPÉS)	Jean-Renaud Ferran	18,809	47.29	+2.99
Turnout		39,773	52.97	+8.61
LREM hold				

=== 2017 ===
Candidate	Label	First round		Second round	
Candidate	Label	Votes	%	Votes	%
Bérangère Couillard	REM	16,032	39.01	17,304	55.70
Bernard Garrigou	PS	6,197	15.08	13,761	44.30
Johanne Sebaux	FI	5,576	13.57		
Karine Roux-Labat	LR	5,094	12.40		
Marlène Mignon	FN	2,818	6.86		
Jean-Yves Grandidier	ECO	2,039	4.96		
Didier Sarrat	PCF	598	1.46		
Patrick Hourquebie	DVD	542	1.32		
Brigitte Ryckwaert-Roumégous	DLF	470	1.14		
Annie Mennechet	DIV	460	1.12		
Laurent Delage	EXG	215	0.52		
Maria Zei-Christiany	DVG	206	0.50		
Patricia Mary	DIV	205	0.50		
Cécile Lafont	DVD	182	0.44		
Ludovic Muys	DIV	179	0.44		
Monique Oratto	EXG	160	0.39		
Carine Fillang	DVD	121	0.29		
Aurélia Ferreira	ECO	1	0.00		
Votes		41,095	100.00	31,065	100.00
Valid votes		41,095	98.61	31,065	91.03
Blank votes		397	0.95	2,109	6.18
Null votes		182	0.44	952	2.79
Turnout		41,674	54.17	34,126	44.36
Abstentions		35,260	45.83	42,808	55.64
Registered voters		76,934		76,934	
Source: Ministry of the Interior

=== 2012 ===
2012 legislative election in Gironde's 7th constituency
Candidate	Party	First round	
Candidate	Party	Votes	%
Alain Rousset	PS	24,316	55.52%
Amel Khattabi	UMP	8,576	19.58%
Gérard Aupetit	FN	3,965	9.05%
Aurélia Sourbe	FG	2,199	5.02%
Laure Curvale	EELV	2,109	4.82%
Frédérique Lucas	NC	1,050	2.40%
Christelle Lapouge	PR	709	1.62%
Isabelle Ufferte	NPA	366	0.84%
Regine Bertrand	Cap 21	279	0.64%
Guillaume Perchet	LO	125	0.29%
Jean-Pierre Lavaud	POI	99	0.23%
Valid votes		43,793	98.86%
Spoilt and null votes		507	1.14%
Votes cast / turnout		44,300	60.92%
Abstentions		28,418	39.08%
Registered voters		72,718	100.00%

=== 2007 ===
Legislative Election 2007: Gironde's 7th constituency
Party	Candidate	Votes	%	±%
PS	Alain Rousset	26,170	42.08	
UMP	Sylvie Dufranc	19,894	31.99	
MoDem	Mathieu Ara	6,117	9.84	
LV	Laure Curvale	2,443	3.93	
Far left	Isabelle Ufferte	1,778	2.86	
FN	Fabrice Sorlin	1,674	2.69	
PCF	Cathy Daguerre	1,547	2.49	
Others	N/A	2,564		
Turnout		62,992	65.18	
2nd round result
PS	Alain Rousset	36,410	60.46	
UMP	Sylvie Dufranc	23,808	39.54	
Turnout		61,995	64.16	
PS hold				

=== 2002 ===
Legislative Election 2002: Gironde's 7th constituency
Party	Candidate	Votes	%	±%
PS	Pierre Ducout	26,474	43.11	
UMP	Michel Dufranc	20,931	34.08	
FN	Maurice Le Gentil	4,612	7.51	
LV	Claire Le Lann	3,025	4.93	
CPNT	Marianic Dumigron	1,630	2.65	
PCF	Odette Eyssautier	1,529	2.49	
Others	N/A	3,212		
Turnout		62,524	68.96	
2nd round result
PS	Pierre Ducout	31,657	57.15	
UMP	Michel Dufranc	23,734	42.85	
Turnout		57,150	63.03	
PS hold				

=== 1997 ===
Legislative Election 1997: Gironde's 7th constituency
Party	Candidate	Votes	%	±%
PS	Pierre Ducout	23,219	41.32	
RPR	Michel Dufranc	14,883	26.48	
FN	Maurice Le Gentil	5,647	10.05	
PCF	Bernard Allemandou	4,328	7.70	
LV	Jean-Pierre Dufour	1,946	3.46	
LO	Jean-Pierre Durand	1,479	2.63	
Others	N/A	4,695		
Turnout		58,643	70.13	
2nd round result
PS	Pierre Ducout	34,873	60.68	
RPR	Michel Dufranc	22,599	39.32	
Turnout		60,635	72.55	
PS hold				

== Sources & References ==
- French Interior Ministry results website: "Résultats électoraux officiels en France" (in French).
