= Michel Sainte-Marie =

French politician (1938–2019)

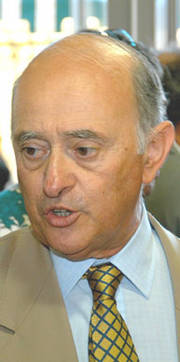
- Parliamentary group: Socialist

Deputy for Gironde's 6th constituency in the National Assembly of France
- In office 2 April 1973 – 1 April 1993
- Preceded by: Robert Brettes
- Succeeded by: Pierre Favre
- In office 1 June 1997 – 19 June 2012
- Preceded by: Pierre Favre
- Succeeded by: Marie Récalde

Personal details
- Born: 18 August 1938 Bayonne (Pyrénées-Atlantiques)
- Died: 27 February 2019 (aged 80)

Michel Sainte-Marie (18 August 1938 – 27 February 2019) was a member of the National Assembly of France. He represented the Gironde department, and was a member of the Socialist, radical, citizen and miscellaneous left (SRC) party.

== Biography ==
Before entering politics, Sainte-Marie was a high school teacher of mathematics, physics and chemistry.

From 1974 to 2014 he was mayor of Mérignac, a commune in the Gironde. Concurrently, from 1977 to 1983 he was president of Bordeaux Métropole, a grouping of communes centred on the city of Bordeaux.

From 1973 to 2012, he was a member of the National Assembly for Gironde's 6th constituency, sitting as a member of the SRC group. He was a member of the Commission de la Défense nationale et des Forces armées (National Defense and Armed Forces Commission) and was President of the France – Oman friendship group.
