= Marie Récalde =

French politician (born 1965)

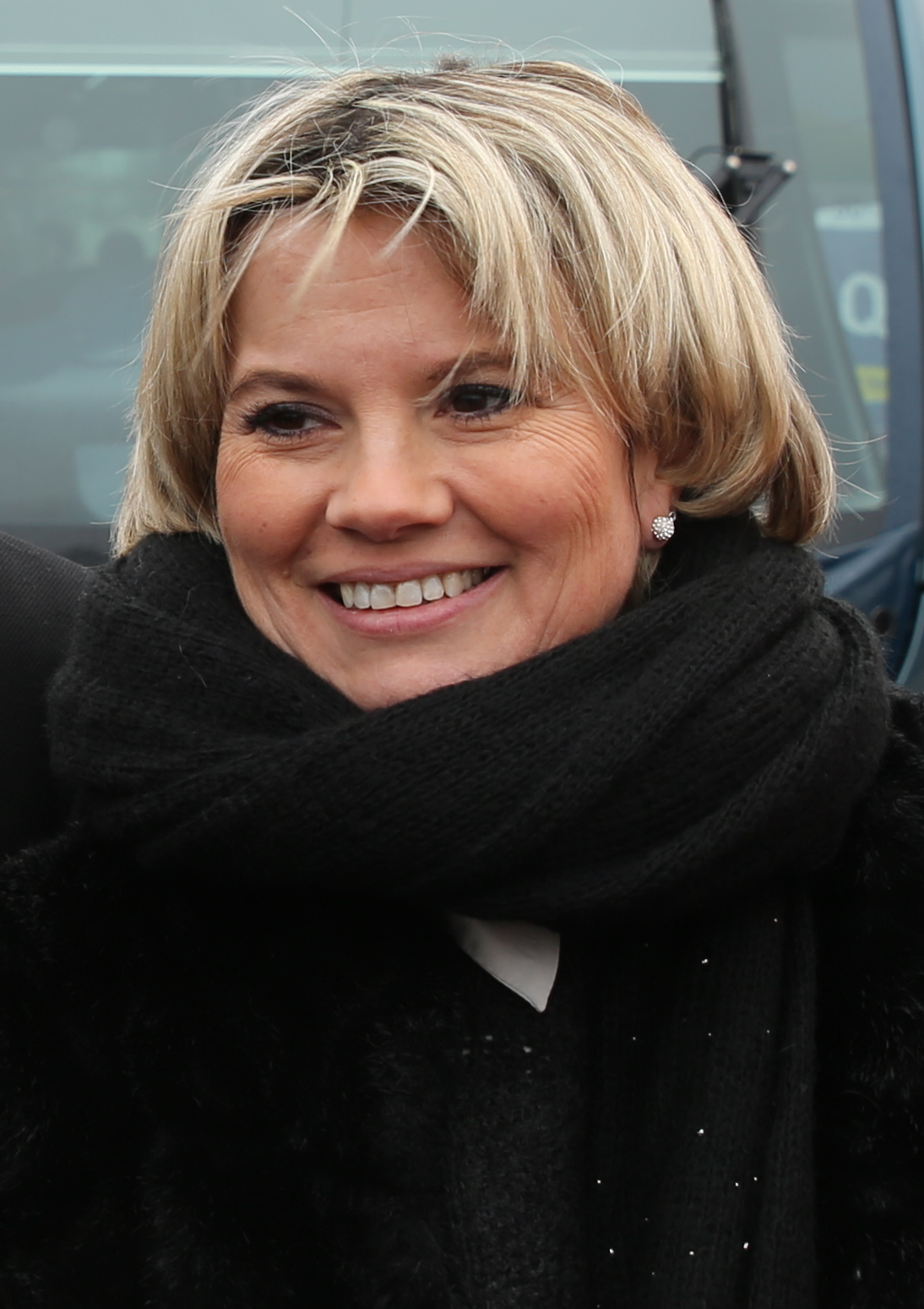
- Récalde in 2015

Member of the French National Assembly for Gironde's 6th constituency
- Incumbent
- Assumed office 18 July 2024
- Preceded by: Éric Poulliat
- In office 20 June 2012 – 20 June 2017
- Preceded by: Michel Sainte-Marie
- Succeeded by: Éric Poulliat

Personal details
- Born: 12 March 1965 (age 61)
- Party: Socialist Party
- Other political affiliations: New Popular Front

Marie Récalde (born 12 March 1965) is a French politician of the Socialist Party. She has been a member of the National Assembly since 2024, having previously served from 2012 to 2017. She has been a member of the Departmental Council of Gironde since 2021, and serves as deputy mayor of Mérignac and vice president of Bordeaux Métropole.
