= Minister for Gender Equality, Diversity and Equal Opportunities =

French Government Department

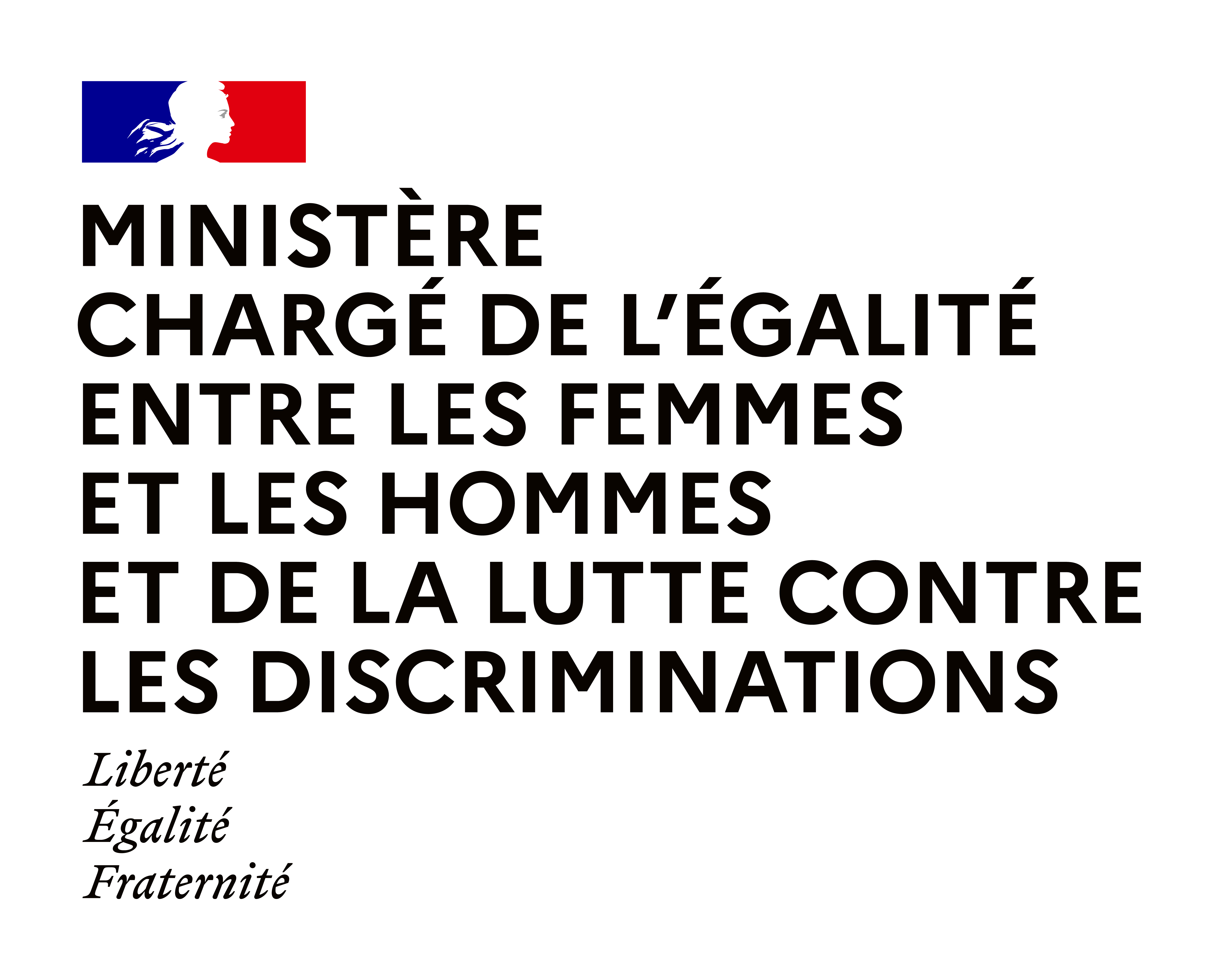

The Minister for Gender Equality, Diversity and Equal Opportunities (French: Ministre chargé des Droits des femmes) is a French government department responsible for developing and enforcing public policies that promote legal and economic equality between women and men, combat gender-based violence and discrimination, improve women's access to employment and political representation, and integrate gender equality objectives across the state. Since 1974, the French government has intermittently included a minister responsible for women's rights. For decades, this Ministry functioned as a junior branch within larger ministries, but it has repeatedly been reshuffled between different cabinets and has operated under a variety of titles.

== Creation and history ==
In 1974, Françoise Giroud became the first minister when President Giscard d'Estaing appointed her as the Secretary of State for Women's Affairs. Françoise Giroud worked as a writer for regional papers during World War II. She later wrote for Elle magazine on women's issues. In 1953 she started a political magazine called L'Express with writer Jean-Jacques Servan-Schreiber. She wrote thousands of articles about women's positions in French society, their economic autonomy, and rights over their bodies. In 1974, President Giscard d'Estaing created the position of Secretary of State for Women's Affairs. During his election campaign he had promised to create a liberal France and a society that was open for women to prosper and have equal rights. The creation of the ministry aimed to push for women's rights in France and start a stable environment for women to prosper in the workforce, economy, education, and politics. As the first Secretary of State for Women's Affairs, Françoise Giroud pushed for political reform within women's rights with civil service entrance exams, social security benefits for widows/divorcees, and penalties against discrimination of women.

In the early years of the ministry, ministers pushed for reproductive rights, professional equality, regional infrastructures, and anti-sexist laws. In 1978, the position of Secretary of State for Women's Affairs became the Minister for the Status of Women. Monique Pelletier, the new Minister for the Status of Women, advocated for maternity care for women, including state-run child care, compensation for maternity leave, and priority housing.

In 1981, the French Socialist Party came into power under President François Mitterrand, and created a new cabinet post: The Minister for Gender Equality, Diversity and Equal Opportunities.

== Significant cultural and political contributions ==
In 1981, Yvette Roudy was appointed la Ministère des Droits de la Femme (The Minister for Women's Rights). Roudy pushed to improve access to contraceptives and for women's reproductive rights. The ministry launched a campaign to spread awareness about women's reproductive rights. The campaign targeted young women, who were likely to be uneducated about reproductive rights. On March 8, 1982, the ministry succeeded in making contraception and abortions accessible. The Ministry created 1.7 million copies of guides of women's rights campaigns, guides on contraception, etc. Yvette Roudy opened Centres d'Information sur les Droits des Femmes (Information Centers on Women's Rights). Roudy opened 100 centers that helped more than 13 million women receive contraception information and updated abortion laws.

In July 1983, the Ministry helped pass a new law that pushed for professional equality. The legislation was made to reform the 1972 equal pay and hiring law, which argued that women where not to be discriminated against without legitimate reason. Women were expected to be compensated when going through pregnancy and childbirth. The law protected women from unsanitary conditions, heavy labor, and threats to reproduction through unsafe work environments. This legislation also advocated for career training programs for young girls.

In 1985, Roudy took legislative initiative on an anti-sexist law. This law aimed for women's right to control degrading images of women in advertising. It enabled women to defend themselves against sexist ads, by allowing women to be able to press charges against advertisers for sexist ads.The law was made to counter sexism through media and to encourage individuals to rethink how they view women.

Under Véronique Neiertz (1991–1993), the position was first integrated into the Ministry of Labor and later placed under the Ministry of Economy and Finance. Her cabinet was characterized by an intersection between women's rights policy with social and economic policy. Neiertz contributed significantly to French women's rights in two main ways. She pioneered legislation against workplace sexual harassment (Decree no. 92–1179 of November 2, 1992). She also reframed women's rights through consumer protection and everyday economic life (Loi Neiertz – Decree of December 31, 1989). This work highlighted how credit and debt systems, as well as abusive commercial practices, disproportionately affect women.

Under Nicole Péry (1998 - 2002), the Minister played a key role in international forums, such as the Beijing World Conference on Women. Péry argued that prostitution and other forms of exploitation constitute violence against women and urged the French state to treat them as such. Péry's advocacy resulted in Decree No. 2001–1240 of 21 December 2001. The Decree created a National Commission against Violence towards Women under the Minister Responsible for Women's Rights. Its mission was to coordinate state services and associations on prevention and support for victims of violence and prostitution; collect data and produce analyses on violence against women; make legislative and regulatory recommendations; and organize a national event every three years on this issue. The Commission, chaired by the Minister for Women's Rights, includes representatives of the state, specialist associations, and qualified public figures. It meets at least once a year and must submit a three-yearly activity report with proposals to the Prime Minister.

Nicole Ameline's (2002 - 2005) flagship initiative was the Charter for Equality between Women and Men, presented on 8 March 2004. To address gender-related disparities, the Charter for Equality brought together nearly 100 public and private stakeholders to implement 280 actions across five areas: political and social parity, professional equality, rights and dignity, work-life balance, and European/international solidarity. The legislation also aimed to eliminate the gender pay gap, support women in combining employment and motherhood, promote women in decision-making positions, and diversify vocational training.

Catherine Vautrin (2005 - 2007) focused on evaluating and implementing the Charter's commitments. Two years after its introduction, Vautrin presented an assessment that highlighted several key points: signatory growth, equality plans, remaining pay gaps, monitoring (data collection and analysis), and social integration. Within her assessments, she identified where the Charter was successful, while highlighting shortcomings to address. She turned Ameline's prior work into a measurable policy instrument, allowing the state to target specific weaknesses in the Charter's implementation.

Najat Vallaud-Belkacem (2012 - 2014) launched what she called a "third generation" of women's rights: the creation of the High Council for Equality, work on parity in economic and political decision-making, and policies to fight gender stereotypes in schools and the media. In 2013, she championed a law which imposed fines on those who solicited sex work from prostitutes. This proposed law received backlash from sex workers, who felt legislation would threaten their livelihoods.

Since 2017, Marlène Schiappa, Élisabeth Moreno, Isabelle Lonvis-Rome, Bérangère Couillard and Aurore Bergé have shifted the focus of the Ministry toward combating sexist and sexual violence and intersectional discrimination.

Minister Lonvis-Rome (2022 - 2023) oversaw the 2023–2027 Interministerial Plan for Equality between Women and Men. The plan organized government action around four main axes: combating violence against women, women's health, professional and economic equality, and building a "culture of equality." Lonvis-Rome drew on her 35 years as a magistrate to insist on better protection and accompaniment of victims from the first report of violence, as well as tackling misogyny and gender stereotypes as root causes. She also framed the plan as an acceleration of reforms launched since 2017, and characterized equality as a "combat" that must be sustained across all ministries in order to achieve far-reaching, concrete equality by 2027.

Minister Elisabeth Moreno (2020 - 2022) presented the 2020–2023 National Action Plan to Promote Equal Rights and Combat Anti-LGBT+ Hatred and Discrimination, which aims to include lesbian, gay, bi, and trans people as full citizens of France. During her tenure, the Ministry was responsible for implementing the Government Action Program against Violence and Discrimination based on Sexual Orientation or Gender Identity (est. 2012), as well as the Mobilization Plan against Anti-LGBT Hatred and Discrimination (2016–2019).

== Current responsibilities of the Minister ==
The minister is currently responsible for overseeing the 4 main functions of The Inter-ministerial Mission for the Protection of Women against Violence and the Fight against Human Trafficking (MIPROF), which coordinates France's public policies on gender-based and domestic violence, develops training and tools for professionals, and supports prevention, data collection, and victim assistance in cases of both violence against women and human trafficking. The four main functions the Minister is responsible for are:

1. To define and establish a professional training plan for female members of the work force, specifically to protect against workplace gender violence. This plan must be suitable for multitudes of professions as well as protect against different forms of violence.
2. To adequately analyze, collect, and share information and data regarding violence against women. The Minister must work hand-in-hand with the Ministry of Justice to analyze reports of spousal homicide procedures.
3. To oversee that policies for the protection of female victims of violence are adequately implemented and followed, as well as to adopt suggestions regarding the existing mechanisms and practices.
4. To coordinate responses regarding the issues of human trafficking.

The minister responsible for women's rights must oversee the implementation of The DILCRAH's (Inter-ministerial Delegation for the Fight against Racism, Anti-Semitism and Anti-LGBT+ Rights) two inter-ministerial plans every six months.

=== Incumbent ===
Aurore Bergé (2024 - 2025) is the incumbent minister. In 2024, she presented a plan that aimed to lessen the influence of a 2016 law that repealed the offense of soliciting, and rather criminalized the clients.

As Minister in Charge of Equality Between Women and Men, she presented a national strategy to combat the prostitution system, which focuses on prevention, protection and support for people in prostitution, and stronger action against pimps and traffickers. Bergé's efforts as Minister singles out online prostitution and sexual exploitation linked to rental platforms and social networks. Her efforts also focus on minors in an effort to continue the government's plan against the prostitution of minors, with more prevention in schools, training for professionals, and dedicated reception centers for exploited children. The Minister made these efforts intentionally before the 2024 Olympics and Paralympics, which were hosted in Paris, to address the predicted uptick in soliciting during these times.

=== Ministers ===
Years	Name	Title of Position
1974–1976	Françoise Giroud	Secretary of State for Women's Affairs
1978–1981	Nicole Pasquier	Secretary of State for Women's Employment
1978–1981	Monique Pelletier	Minister Delegate for the Status of Women / of the Family and the Status of Women
1981–1986	Yvette Roudy	Minister (Deputy) for Women's Rights / Minister for Women's Rights
1988	Georgina Dufoix	Minister Delegate in charge of Family, Women's Rights, Solidarity and Repatriates
1988–1991	Michèle André	Secretary of State for Women's Rights
1991–1993	Véronique Neiertz	Secretary of State for Women's Rights and Daily Life / Consumer Affairs
1997–2001	Nicole Péry	Secretary of State for Women's Rights and Vocational Training
2002–2005	Nicole Ameline	Minister Delegate for Parity and Professional Equality
2005–2007	Catherine Vautrin	Minister Delegate for Social Cohesion and Gender Equality
2012–2014	Najat Vallaud-Belkacem	Minister for Women's Rights, Government Spokesperson
2014–2016	Najat Vallaud-Belkacem	Minister for Women's Rights, Urban Affairs, Youth and Sports
2014–2016	Pascale Boistard	Secretary of State for Women's Rights
2016–2017	Laurence Rossignol	Minister for Families, Children and Women's Rights
2017–2020	Marlène Schiappa	Secretary of State for Gender Equality / ... and the Fight against Discrimination
2020–2022	Élisabeth Moreno	Minister Delegate for Gender Equality, Diversity and Equal Opportunities
2022–2023	Isabelle Lonvis-Rome	Minister Delegate for Gender Equality, Diversity and Equal Opportunities
2023–2024	Bérangère Couillard	Minister Delegate for Gender Equality and the Fight against Discrimination
2024–2025	Aurore Bergé	Minister Delegate for Gender Equality and the Fight against Discrimination

== Bibliography ==
- “Age, expérience, origine partisane : qui sont les ministres et secrétaires d'Etat du gouvernement Castex ?” Le Monde, 6 July 2020, https://www.lemonde.fr/les-decodeurs/article/2020/07/06/famille-politique-etudes-ou-precedentes-fonctions-decouvrez-qui-sont-les-membres-du-gouvernement-castex_6045396_4355770.html. Accessed 12 November 2025.
- Buffery, Vicky, and Nicholas Vinocur. “French Lower House Backs New Prostitution Law.” Reuters, 4 Dec. 2013, www.reuters.com/article/uk-france-prostitution/french-lower-house-backs-new-prostitution-law-idUKBRE9B30R220131204
- Cordier, Solène. “Le gouvernement dévoile son plan de lutte contre la prostitution.” Le Monde, 2 May 2024, www.lemonde.fr/societe/article/2024/05/02/le-gouvernement-devoile-son-plan-de-lutte-contre-la-prostitution_6231206_3224.html. Accessed 15 Nov. 2025.
- Dental, Monique. “L’État, les droits des femmes et les recherches féministes en France.” Les Cahiers du CEDREF, no. 6, 1997, pp. 191–200. DOI: 10.4000/cedref.1778.
- “EQUAL OPPORTUNITIES : EP CALLS FOR QUALITATIVE LEAP ON GENDER EQUALITY.” European Social Policy, 2010, p. 268104.
- France. Décret n° 2001–1240 du 21 décembre 2001 portant création d’une Commission nationale contre les violences envers les femmes. Legifrance, www.legifrance.gouv.fr/loda/id/JORFTEXT000000215369/. Accessed 26 Nov. 2025.
- Jenson, Jane. “THE WORK OF THE MINISTERE DES DROITS DE LA FEMME.” Newsletter (Conference Group on French Politics and Society), no. 4, 1983, pp. 3–9. JSTOR, http://www.jstor.org/stable/43774779. Accessed 25 Nov. 2025.
- Keeley '97, Kirsten, "Direct and Indirect Effects of Feminist Actions on Women's Rights in France" (1997). Honors Projects. 2.https://digitalcommons.iwu.edu/french_honproj/2
- Lewis, Flora. France Appoints a Minister for Women, The New York Times, 17 July 1974, www.nytimes.com/1974/07/17/archives/france-appoints-a-minister-for-women.html.
- "L'Action du ministère des droits de la femme, 1981-86: un bilan" The French Review, 1988 pp. 931–941
- “Les Femmes Entrent Au Gouvernement.” Sénat, www.senat.fr/connaitre-le-senat/lhistoire-du-senat/dossiers-dhistoire/d35/les-femmes-et-le-pouvoir-20.html.
- Long, Imogen. “A powerful political platform: Françoise Giroud andl’expressin a Cold War climate.” French History, vol. 30, no. 2, 22 Apr. 2016, pp. 241–258, https://doi.org/10.1093/fh/crw001.
- Modern France. United States, ABC-CLIO, 2022.
- “Missions et organisation du ministère chargé de l'Égalité entre les femmes et les hommes et de la Lutte contre les discriminations | Égalité-femmes-hommes.” egalite-femmes-hommes.gouv.fr, 23 November 2015, https://www.egalite-femmes-hommes.gouv.fr/missions-et-organisation-du-ministere. Accessed 5 November 2025.
- Plan Interministerial for Equality between Women and Men 2023–2027. Government of France, Ministry Delegate for Gender Equality, Diversity and Equal Opportunities, 8 Mar. 2023, www.egalite-femmes-hommes.gouv.fr/sites/efh/files/2023–03/Plan_interministeriel_pour_l%E2%80%99egalite_entre_les_femmes_et_les_hommes_2023-2027_2.pdf.
- "Politics of Difference: The Women's Movement in France from May 1968 to Mitterrand" Signs, Vol. 9, No. 2 (Winter, 1983), pp. 282–293
- Sénat. Le Secrétariat d'état à la condition féminine. Les femmes et le pouvoir, Sénat de la République française, https://www.senat.fr/connaitre-le-senat/lhistoire-du-senat/dossiers-dhistoire/d35/les-femmes-et-le-pouvoir-3.html. Accessed 15 Nov. 2025.
- Study on Gender Training in the European Union: Mapping, Research and Stakeholders' Engagement (2012–13).. France. EIGE, 2013. Accessed 5 November 2025.
- “Travaux de la délégation aux droits des femmes : audition de Mme Nicole Ameline, ministre déléguée à la parité et à l’égalité professionnelle, auprès du ministre des affaires sociales, du travail et de la solidarité.” Sénat, 29 Oct. 2003, www.senat.fr/travaux-parlementaires/office‑et‑delegations/delegation‑aux‑droits‑des‑femmes‑et‑a‑l‑egalite‑des‑chances/archives‑1/travaux-de-la-delegation-aux-droits-des-femmes-50.html. Accessed 26 Nov. 2025.
- Vautrin, Catherine. “Sur le bilan de la Charte de l’égalité.” Vie publique, 8 Mar. 2006, www.vie-publique.fr/discours/161056-catherine-vautrin-08032006-sur-le-bilan-de-la-charte-de-l-egalite. Accessed 26 Nov. 2025.
- "Women and politics in France 1958-2000." United Kingdom, Routledge, 2000.
- “# France LGBT+.” National Action Plan to Promote Equal Rights and Combat Anti-LGBT+ Hatred and Discrimination, 2020–2023 ed., French Government.
