= Isabelle Lonvis-Rome =

French politician (born 1963)

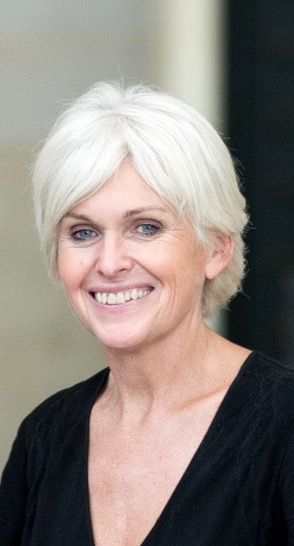

Minister for Gender Equality, Diversity and Equal Opportunities
- In office 20 May 2022 – 20 July 2023
- Prime Minister: Élisabeth Borne
- Preceded by: Élisabeth Moreno
- Succeeded by: Bérangère Couillard

Personal details
- Born: Isabelle Lonvis; 29 April 1963 (age 63) Bourg-en-Bresse, France
- Party: Independent
- Education: French National School for the Judiciary

Isabelle Lonvis-Rome (née Lonvis; born 29 April 1963) is a French politician who served as Minister for Gender Equality, Diversity and Equal Opportunities in the government of Prime Minister Élisabeth Borne from May 2022 to July 2023.
