= Gironde's 6th constituency =

Constituency of the National Assembly of France

6th constituency of Gironde
- inline Constituency of the National Assembly of France

- Location of constituency in Department

- Location of Gironde in France
- Deputy: Marie Recalde; PS
- Department: Gironde
- Cantons: (pre-2015) Mérignac I, Mérignac II, Saint-Médard-en-Jalles.

The 6th constituency of the Gironde (French: Sixième circonscription de la Gironde) is a French legislative constituency in Gironde département. Like the other 576 French constituencies, it elects one MP using the two-round system, with a run-off if no candidate receives over 50% of the vote in the first round.

== Historical Representation ==
Election	Member	Party
1988	Michel Sainte-Marie	PS
1993	Pierre Favre	PR
1997	Michel Sainte-Marie	PS
2002	Michel Sainte-Marie	PS
2007	Michel Sainte-Marie	PS
2012	Marie Récalde	PS
2017	Éric Poulliat	LREM
2022	Éric Poulliat	RE
2024	Marie Recalde	PS

== Election results ==
=== 2024 ===
Candidate	Party	Alliance	First round			Second round		
Candidate	Party	Alliance	Votes	%	+/–	Votes	%	+/–
Marie Récalde	PS	NFP	27,564	35.24	+1.31	31,079	39.78	-12.07
Eric Poulliat	RE	Ensemble	25,636	32.78	-2.05	25,455	32.58	-15.57
Jimmy Bourlieux	RN		21,174	27.07	+12.20	21,600	27.64	new
Jonathan Florit	DVD		1,387	1.77	+1.45			
Nicole Destouesse	REC		929	1.19	-2.74			
Franck Bonhomme	RES!		847	1.08	-0.08			
Guillaume Perchet	LO		673	0.86	+0.02			
Votes			78,210	100.00		78,134	100.00	
Valid votes			78,210	97.61	-0.42	78,134	97.72	+3.77
Blank votes			1,398	1.74	+0.23	1,352	1.69	-2.49
Null votes			518	0.65	+0.19	470	0.59	-1.28
Turnout			80,126	73.50	+21.28	79,956	73.33	+22.24
Abstentions			28,883	26.50	-21.28	29,079	26.67	-22.24
Registered voters			109,009			109,035		
Result			PS GAIN FROM RE					

=== 2022 ===
Legislative Election 2022: Gironde's 6th constituency
Party	Candidate	Votes	%	±%
LREM (Ensemble)	Éric Poulliat	19,258	34.83	-9.30
PS (NUPÉS)	Vanessa Fergeau-Renaux	18,765	33.93	+1.42
RN	Jimmy Bourlieux	8,222	14.87	+6.47
LR (UDC)	Thomas Dovichi	2,815	5.09	−5.78
REC	Jérôme Paris	2,174	3.93	N/A
Others	N/A	4,064	7.35	
Turnout		55,298	52.22	+0.05
2nd round result
LREM (Ensemble)	Éric Poulliat	26,893	51.85	-6.96
PS (NUPÉS)	Vanessa Fergeau-Renaux	24,969	48.15	+6.96
Turnout		51,862	51.09	+8.25
LREM hold				

=== 2017 ===
Candidate	Label	First round		Second round	
Candidate	Label	Votes	%	Votes	%
Éric Poulliat	REM	23,543	44.13	23,690	58.81
Marie Récalde	PS	7,502	14.06	16,590	41.19
Marie Duret-Pujol	FI	7,260	13.61		
Rémi Cocuelle	UDI	5,799	10.87		
Marie-Mauricette Martinez	FN	4,481	8.40		
Ludovic Guitton	ECO	1,915	3.59		
Pierre Cazenave	PCF	668	1.25		
Véronique Silverio	DIV	629	1.18		
Frédérique Bacci	ECO	449	0.84		
Sandrine Peny	DLF	418	0.78		
Olivier Loisel	DIV	373	0.70		
Guillaume Perchet	EXG	280	0.52		
Frédéric Dossche	DIV	31	0.06		
Votes		53,348	100.00	40,280	100.00
Valid votes		53,348	98.58	40,280	90.65
Blank votes		565	1.04	2,882	6.49
Null votes		203	0.38	1,274	2.87
Turnout		54,116	52.17	44,436	42.84
Abstentions		49,612	47.83	59,292	57.16
Registered voters		103,728		103,728	
Source: Ministry of the Interior

=== 2012 ===
2012 legislative election in Gironde's 6th constituency
Candidate	Party	First round		Second round	
Candidate	Party	Votes	%	Votes	%
Marie Recalde	PS	27,211	48.22%	32,863	63.43%
Thierry Millet	NC	14,292	25.33%	18,948	36.57%
Jean-Luc Aupetit	FN	5,636	9.99%		
Joël Saintier	FG	2,975	5.27%		
Gérard Chausset	EELV	2,501	4.43%		
Pierre Braun	MoDem	1,969	3.49%		
Bernard Gonzalez	DLR	627	1.11%		
Philippe Rouze	NPA	361	0.64%		
Sylvie Ferrari	MEI	350	0.62%		
Juliette Toubiana	AEI	265	0.47%		
Nelly Malaty	LO	239	0.42%		
Valid votes		56,426	98.96%	51,811	97.43%
Spoilt and null votes		594	1.04%	1,369	2.57%
Votes cast / turnout		57,020	59.87%	53,180	55.81%
Abstentions		38,220	40.13%	42,111	44.19%
Registered voters		95,240	100.00%	95,291	100.00%

=== 2007 ===
Legislative Election 2007: Gironde's 6th constituency
Party	Candidate	Votes	%	±%
PS	Michel Sainte-Marie	21,308	37.58	
UMP	Marie-Hélène Mutter	14,963	26.39	
MoDem	Jacques Mangon	6,401	11.29	
NM	Thierry Millet	5,789	10.21	
LV	Xavier Lhomme	2,248	3.96	
Far left	Jean-Marie Benaben	1,529	2.70	
FN	Diéderik Meynier	1,352	2.38	
PCF	Michelle Iste	1,205	2.13	
Others	N/A	1,910		
Turnout		57,405	64.29	
2nd round result
PS	Michel Sainte-Marie	31,740	57.19	
UMP	Marie-Hélène Mutter	23,757	42.81	
Turnout		56,891	63.71	
PS hold				

=== 2002 ===
Legislative Election 2002: Gironde's 6th constituency
Party	Candidate	Votes	%	±%
PS	Michel Sainte-Marie	21,362	38.53	
UMP	Pierre Favre	20,365	36.73	
FN	Valerie Colombier	4,358	7.86	
LV	Gerard Chausset	2,221	4.01	
CPNT	Jean-Jose Demanes	1,518	2.74	
PCF	Line Peron	1,363	2.46	
Others	N/A	4,260		
Turnout		56,292	70.29	
2nd round result
PS	Michel Sainte-Marie	26,108	51.59	
UMP	Pierre Favre	24,499	48.41	
Turnout		52,084	65.03	
PS hold				

=== 1997 ===
Legislative Election 1997: Gironde's 6th constituency
Party	Candidate	Votes	%	±%
PS	Michel Sainte-Marie	18,415	37.16	
UDF	Pierre Favre	14,834	29.93	
FN	François-Régis Taveau	5,186	10.46	
PCF	Denis Lacoste	3,598	7.26	
LV	Xavier Svahn	1,595	3.22	
GE	Stéphane Lacaze	1,468	2.96	
LO	Nelly Malaty	1,429	2.88	
Others	N/A	3,037		
Turnout		51,771	69.83	
2nd round result
PS	Michel Sainte-Marie	28,962	55.75	
UDF	Pierre Favre	22,991	44.25	
Turnout		54,730	73.82	
PS gain from UDF				

== Sources ==
- French Interior Ministry results website: "Résultats électoraux officiels en France" (in French).
