= Élisabeth Moreno =

French-Cape Verdean businesswoman

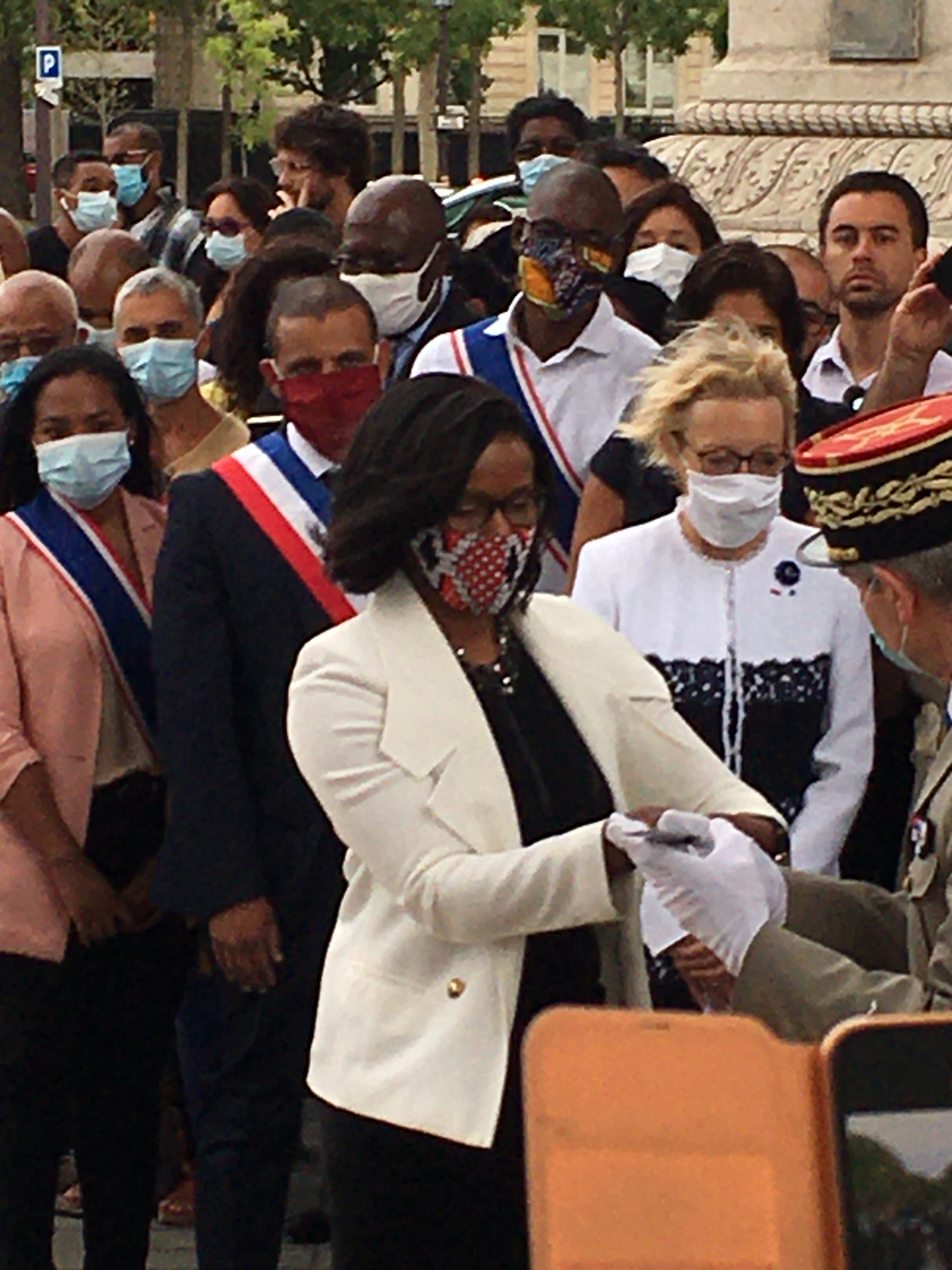
- Moreno in 2020

Minister Delegate for Gender Equality, Diversity and Equal Opportunities
- In office 6 July 2020 – 20 May 2022
- Prime Minister: Jean Castex
- Preceded by: Marlène Schiappa
- Succeeded by: Isabelle Lonvis-Rome

Personal details
- Born: 20 September 1970 (age 56) Tarrafal, Cape Verde
- Education: UPEC; University of Mannheim; ESSEC Business School

Élisabeth Moreno (born 20 September 1970) is a French-Cape Verdean businesswoman and politician who served as Minister Delegate for Gender Equality, Diversity and Equal Opportunities at the Prime Minister's Office in the government of Prime Minister Jean Castex from 2020 to 2022.

== Early life and career ==
Moreno moved from Cape Verde to France with her family in the late 1970s, in order for them to access medical infrastructure to treat Moreno's younger sister for burns. Her career has included growing a company in the construction sector that she created with her husband, four years at France Telecom, and later at Dell. In 2006 she obtained an Executive MBA from ESSEC Business School and the University of Mannheim.

Before entering politics, Moreno worked as vice-president and managing director of Hewlett-Packard for Africa from 2019 until 2020, based in South Africa, and as president of Lenovo France from 2017 until 2019.

== Political career ==
Under Moreno's leadership, the French government successfully introduced a bill intended to protect victims of domestic violence, allowing doctors to break patient confidentiality if they believe a life is "in immediate danger".

In January 2022, Moreno and Agnès Pannier-Runacher jointly published a book on feminism.

In the 2022 French legislative election, Moreno contested the 9th constituency for French residents overseas but was narrowly beaten by Karim Ben Cheïkh from Génération.s (NUPES) in the second round.

== Other activities ==
- Sanofi, Member of the Diversity, Equity and Inclusion (DE&I) Board (since 2023)

== See also ==
- Castex Government
