= Éric Poulliat =

French politician

Member of the National Assembly for Gironde's 6th constituency
- Incumbent
- Assumed office 21 June 2017
- Preceded by: Marie Récalde

Personal details
- Born: 9 July 1974 (age 52) Bordeaux, France
- Party: Renaissance (2016–present)
- Other political affiliations: Socialist Party (2005–2014)
- Education: Bordeaux Montaigne University

Éric Poulliat (born 9 July 1974) is a French politician of Renaissance (RE) who has been serving as a member of the National Assembly from 2017 elections to 2024, representing the department of Gironde.

Beginning in 2026, he was elected Mayor of Le Haillan on an independent list. Subsequently, he was appointed Vice-President of Bordeaux Métropole in charge of aeronautics, aerospace, and defense affairs, under the presidency of Thomas Cazenave.

== Political career ==
A native of Bordeaux, Poulliat is a former member of the Socialist Party (2005–2014). He served as chief of staff to the Mayor of Saint-Médard-en-Jalles from 2008 to 2014.

In parliament, Poulliat serves on the Committee on Cultural Affairs and Education. From 2017 until 2019, he was also a member of the Committee on Legal Affairs.

== Political positions ==
In 2019, Pouillat co-authored a parliamentarian report on the growing influence of radical Islamism in French public services, wit Éric Diard.

In July 2019, Poulliat decided not to align with his parliamentary group's majority and became one of 52 LREM members who abstained from a vote on the French ratification of the European Union’s Comprehensive Economic and Trade Agreement (CETA) with Canada.
