= Alain Rousset =

French politician

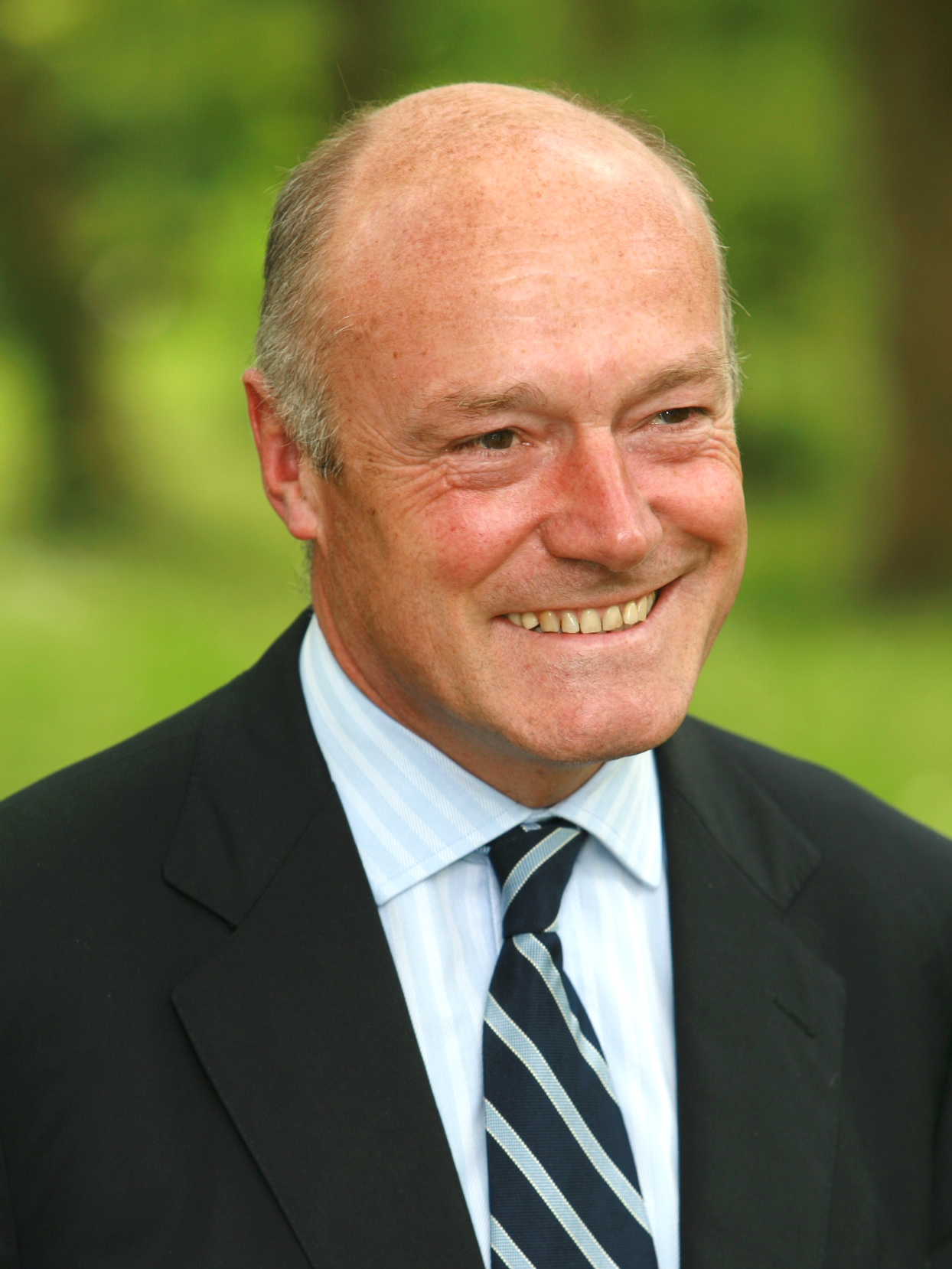

President of the Regional Council of Nouvelle-Aquitaine
- Incumbent
- Assumed office 20 March 1998
- Preceded by: Jacques Valade

Member of the French National Assembly for Gironde
- In office 17 June 2007 – 20 June 2017
- Preceded by: Pierre Ducout

Personal details
- Born: 16 February 1951 (age 75) Chazelles-sur-Lyon, France
- Party: Socialist Party
- Education: Sciences Po

Alain Rousset (French pronunciation: [alɛ̃ ʁusɛ]; born 16 February 1951) is a French politician. Rousset is the Socialist president of the Nouvelle-Aquitaine region of France, and a Deputy in the National Assembly of France, representing the 7th constituency of the Gironde.

== Political career ==
=== President of the Regional Council of Aquitaine, 1998–2015 ===
Rousset was elected to the Regional Council of Aquitaine in the 1998 elections and then reelected in 2004.

In 2010, Rousset proposed a "Plan for Digital Aquitaine".

=== Member of the National Assembly, 2007–2017 ===
Rousset entered the National Assembly in the 2007 elections, representing Gironde's 7th constituency. In parliament, he served on the Committee on National Defence and the Armed Forces.

In the Socialist Party's 2011 primaries, Rousset endorsed François Hollande as the party's candidate for the 2012 presidential election.

On 11 February 2014, Rousset was among the guests invited to the state dinner hosted by U.S. President Barack Obama in honor of President François Hollande at the White House.

In the Socialist Party's presidential primaries, Rousset endorsed Manuel Valls as the party's candidate for the 2017 French presidential election. He later supported Emmanuel Macron in the elections.
