= Fourth constituency of the Ain =

Constituency of the National Assembly of France

Ain's 4th constituency
- inline Constituency of the National Assembly of France

- Boundary of Ain's 4th constituency in Ain

- Location of Ain within France
- Deputy: Jérôme Buisson; RN
- Department: Ain

The 4th constituency of the Ain is a French legislative constituency in the Ain département.

== Members elected ==
Election	Member	Party
1988	Michel Voisin	UDF
1993	Michel Voisin	UDF
1997	Michel Voisin	UDF
2002	Michel Voisin	UMP
2007	Michel Voisin	UMP
2012	Michel Voisin	UMP
2017	Stéphane Trompille	LREM
2022	Jérôme Buisson	RN
2024	Jérôme Buisson	RN

== Election results ==
=== 2024 ===
Candidate	Party	Alliance	First round			Second round		
Candidate	Party	Alliance	Votes	%	+/–	Votes	%	+/–
Jérôme Buisson	RN		30,221	46.01	+21.19	33,186	51.35	-10.92
Christophe Coquelet	HOR	ENS	14,367	21.87	+5.53	31,437	48.65	N/A
Charline Liotier	LÉ	NFP	13,113	19.96	+2.58	WITHDREW		
Guy Billoudet	LR		7,179	10.93	-5.14			
Sylvain Cousson	LO		705	1.07	+0.39			
Jérémy Nicaud	DIV		85	0.13	N/A			
Yannick Bresson	DIV		17	0.03	N/A			
Valid votes			65,687	97.20	-0.94	64,623	95.40	+11.38
Blank votes			592	0.79	+0.33	697	1.03	-2.26
Null votes			1,361	2.01	+0.61	2,419	3.57	-9.12
Turnout			67,580	70.31	+22.22	67,739	70.46	+24.94
Abstentions			28,539	29.69	-22.22	28,394	29.54	-24.94
Registered voters			96,119			94,903		
Source: Ministry of the Interior, Le Monde
Result						RN HOLD		

=== 2022 ===
Candidate	Party	Alliance	First round		Second round	
Candidate	Party	Alliance	Votes	%	Votes	%
Jérôme Buisson	RN		11,116	24.82	22,601	62.27
Philippe Lerda	LFI	NUPES	7,786	17.38	13,696	37.73
Isabelle Seguin	LREM	Ensemble	7,317	16.34		
Aurane Reihanian	LR	UDC	7,198	16.07		
Stéphane Trompille*	DVC	diss.	4,211	9.40		
Benoît De Boysson	REC		2,506	5.59		
Ali Benmedjahed	PRG		2,215	4.95		
Nicolas Favre	PA		1,119	2.50		
Annick Veillerot	DLF	DSV	562	1.25		
Sacha Forca	LMR		443	0.99		
Sylvain Cousson	LO		308	0.69		
Alban Defrasne	PP		11	0.02		
Valid votes			44,792	98.14	36,297	84.02
Blank votes			638	1.40	5,481	12.69
Null votes			209	0.46	1,423	3.29
Turnout			45,639	48.09	43,201	45.52
Abstentions			49,258	51.91	51,702	54.48
Registered voters			94,897		94,903	
Result			RN GAIN FROM LREM			

- Incumbent Stéphane Trompille ran as a dissident member of La République En Marche! without the support of the Ensemble Citoyens coalition.

=== 2017 ===
Candidate	Label	First round		Second round	
Candidate	Label	Votes	%	Votes	%
Stéphane Trompille	LREM	15,492	36.00	22,532	64.50
Blanche Chaussat	FN	7,964	18.51	12,404	35.50
Guy Billoudet	LR	7,178	16.68		
Line Huguet	FI	3,426	7.96		
Muriel Luga-Giraud	UDI	3,164	7.35		
Sylviane Chêne	PRG	2,025	4.71		
Anne Partensky-Leibman	ECO	1,391	3.23		
Annick Veillerot	DLF	860	2.00		
Olivia Symniacos	DIV	459	1.07		
Catherine Lattard	PCF	348	0.81		
Yves Antoinette	DIV	232	0.54		
Thierry Loubignes	DIV	199	0.46		
Electre Dracos	EXG	198	0.46		
Xavier Adam	DIV	97	0.23		
Votes		43,033	100.00	34,936	100.00
Valid votes		43,033	98.33	34,936	91.21
Blank votes		521	1.19	2,670	6.97
Null votes		211	0.48	697	1.82
Turnout		43,765	48.96	38,303	42.85
Abstentions		45,625	51.04	51,079	57.15
Registered voters		89,390		89,382	
Source: Ministry of the Interior

=== 2012 ===
Summary of the 10 June and 17 June 2012 French legislative in Ain's 4th Constituency election results
Candidate	Party		1st round		2nd round	
Candidate	Party		Votes	%	Votes	%
Michel Voisin	Union for a Popular Movement	UMP	20,050	40.73%	26,175	56.96%
Guillaume Lacroix	Radical Party of the Left	PRG	15,419	31.32%	19,780	43.04%
Corinne Mossire	National Front	FN	9,390	19.07%		
Daniel Blatrix	Left Front	FG	1,560	3.17%		
Nicolas Zielinski	The Greens	VEC	1,521	3.09%		
Michèle Vianes	Miscellaneous Right	DVD	635	1.29%		
Laurence Mayer	Ecologist	ECO	300	0.61%		
Jean-François Mortel	Far Left	ExG	192	0.39%		
Electre Dracos	Far Left	ExG	163	0.33%		
Total			49,230	100%	45,955	100%
Registered voters			84,591		84,589	
Blank/Void ballots			651	1.31%	1,250	2.65%
Turnout			49,881	58.97%	47,205	55.81%
Abstentions			34,710	41.03%	37,384	44.19%
Result					UMP HOLD	

=== 2007 ===
Legislative Election 2007: Ain 4th
Party	Candidate	Votes	%	±%
UMP	Michel Voisin	33,777	53.14	
PS	Christophe Greffet	12,395	19.50	
MoDem	Pierre Cormoreche	4,895	7.70	
FN	Jean-Loup de Lacheisserie	3,541	5.57	
LV	Claude Montessuit	2,409	3.79	
Far left	Catherine Vacle	2,133	3.36	
PCF	Jacqueline Burgat	1,270	2.00	
MPF	Hervé Le Maout	1,081	1.70	
MEI	Christel Michaud	737	1.16	
CPNT	Marie-Françoise Mandras	716	1.13	
LO	Electre Dracos	608	0.96	
Turnout		63,562	58.80	
UMP hold		Swing		

=== 2002 ===
Candidate	Label	First round		Second round→	
Candidate	Label	Votes	%	Votes	%
Michel Voisin	UMP	28,045	45.73	33,671	63.50
Michel Raymomd	PS	15,110	24.64	19,358	36.50
Jean-Loup de Lacheisserie	FN	10,102	16.47		
Françoise Mandras	CPNT	1,325	2.16		
Anne Partensky	LV	956	1.56		
Dominique Vial	Pôle républicain	844	1.38		
Jean-François Mortel	LCR	832	1.36		
Jacqueline Burgat	PCF	733	1.20		
Giles Dommanget	RPF	667	1.09		
Philippe Lebreton	MÉI	624	1.02		
Renée Jouvet	MNR	551	0.90		
Michele Levêque	MPF	512	0.83		
Electra Dracos	LO	492	0.80		
Julien Duchesne	Far Left	225	0.37		
Hamida Bensmaine	GÉ	210	0.34		
Christelle Prétre	Ind	75	0.12		
Marcel Damien	Ind	29	0.05		
Votes		50,539	100.00	41,702	100.00
Valid votes		61,332	98.28	53,029	96.87
Blank or null votes		1,073	1.72	1,714	3.13
Turnout		62,405	63.50	54,743	55.71
Abstentions		35,866	36.50	43,522	44.29
Registered voters		98,271		98,265	
Source: Ministry of the Interior

=== 1997 ===
Candidate	Party	Alliance	First round		Second round	
Candidate	Party	Alliance	Votes	%	Votes	%
Michel Voisin (incumbent))	UDF	FD	20,388	37.43	32,294	55.92
Michel Raymond	PS		14,630	26.86	25,454	44.08
Jean-Loup de Lacheisserie	FN		10,836	19.89		
Marcelle Dos Santos	PCF		2,591	4.76		
Jean-Paul Gaucher	LV		1,982	3.64		
Giles Dommanget	MPF	LDI	1,667	3.06		
Paul Biajoux	GÉ		1,581	3.39		
Daniel Véricel	CAP		1,033	1.90		
Valid votes			54,475	94.51	57,748	93.96
Blank or Null votes			3,167	5.49	3,709	6.04
Turnout			57,642	66.08	61,457	70.47
Abstentions			29,594	33.92	25,753	29.53
Registered voters			87,236		87,210	
Result			UDF HOLD			

=== 1993 ===
Candidate	Party	Alliance	First round		Second round	
Candidate	Party	Alliance	Votes	%	Votes	%
Michel Voisin (incumbent))	UDF	CDS	25,753	48.87	31,627	71.99
André Clavel	FN		9,203	17.46	12,309	28.02
Michel Raymond	PS	ADFP	8,408	15.96		
Alain Moussel	GE	EE	4,487	8.51		
Christian Desmaris	PCF		2,816	5.34		
Dominique Aubert	LT-LNE		2,042	3.87		
Valid votes			52,708	94.08	43,936	84.91
Blank or Null votes			3,314	5.92	7,808	15.09
Turnout			56,022	66.17	51,744	61.12
Abstentions			28,638	33.83	32,910	38.88
Registered voters			84,660		84,654	
Result			UDF HOLD			

=== 1988 ===
Candidate	Party	Alliance	First round		Second round	
Candidate	Party	Alliance	Votes	%	Votes	%
Noel Ravassard	PS		20,419	43.26	26,451	49.31
Michel Voisin (incumbent))	UDF	URC, CDS	15,727	33.32	27,188	50.69
Philippe Hartemann	FN		5,326	11.28		
Bernard Lobietti	UDF		3,028	6.42		
Christian Desmaris	PCF		1,924	4.08		
Alain Coquard	DVG		774	1.64		
Valid votes			47,198	98.27	53,639	98.31
Blank or Null votes			831	1.73	923	1.69
Turnout			48,029	60.91	54,562	69.21
Abstentions			30,821	39.09	24,273	30.79
Registered voters			78,850		78,835	
Result			UDF WIN			

== Sources ==
- Official results of French elections from 1998: "Résultats électoraux officiels en France" (in French). Archived from the original on 20 December 2011.
