= Yvelines's 10th constituency =

Constituency of the National Assembly of France

10th constituency of the Yvelines
- inline Constituency of the National Assembly of France

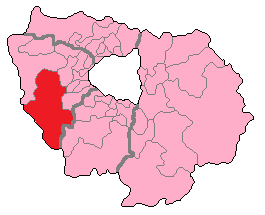
- Yvelines' 10th Constituency shown within Île-de-France
- Deputy: Aurore Bergé; RE
- Department: Yvelines
- Cantons: Monfort-l'Amaury, Rambouillet, Saint-Arnoult-en-Yvelines, Maurepas (excluding the communes of Elancourt and La Verrière)
- Registered voters: 86,778

The 10th constituency of the Yvelines is a French legislative constituency in the Yvelines département.

== Description ==
Yvelines' 10th constituency covers the largely rural southern territory of the department and is its largest seat.

The seat has elected conservatives at every legislative election since its creation in 1988. However, in 2010 the seat was won in a by-election Anny Poursinoff of the EELV. The seat returned to its historic pattern in 2012 when it elected the man she defeated in that by-election Jean-Frédéric Poisson of the PCD.

== Historic Representation ==
Election	Member	Party
1986	Proportional representation – no election by constituency	
1988	Christine Boutin	UDF
1993	Christine Boutin	UDF
1997	Christine Boutin	UDF
2002	Christine Boutin	UMP
2007	Christine Boutin	UMP
2009	Jean-Frédéric Poisson	UMP
2010	Anny Poursinoff	EELV
2012	Jean-Frédéric Poisson	PCD
2017	Aurore Bergé	LREM
2022	Aurore Bergé	RE

== Election results ==
=== 2024 ===
Candidate	Party	Alliance	First round			Second round		
Candidate	Party	Alliance	Votes	%	+/–	Votes	%	+/–
Aurore Bergé	RE	ENS	22,367	33.59	+0.16	32,048	49.05	-14.22
Thomas du Chalard	RN		18,765	28.22	+15.27	21,035	32.19	n/a
Cédric Briolais	LFI	NFP	14,918	22.40	+0.36	12,255	18.76	-17.97
Gaël Barbotin	LR		6,783	16.22	-0.91			
Julien Gautrelet	DVG		2,260	3.39	N/A			
Ethel Fournier-Campion	DVE		1,141	1.71	N/A			
Olivier Gousseau	REC		894	1.34	-4.51			
Hélène Janisset	LO		421	0.63	-0.24			
Valid votes			66,593	98.23	-0.37	65,338	97.43	+44.76
Blank votes			872	1.29	+0.26	1,338	2.00	+0.71
Null votes			326	0.48	+0.11	388	0.58	+0.10
Turnout			67,791	73.30	+17.86	67,064	72.50	-0.80
Abstentions			24,689	26.70	-17.86	25,440	27.50	+0.80
Registered voters			92,480			92,504		
Source: Ministry of the Interior, Le Monde
Result						REN HOLD		

=== 2022 ===
Legislative Election 2022: Yvelines's 10th constituency
Party	Candidate	Votes	%	±%
LREM (Ensemble)	Aurore Bergé	16,727	33.43	-13.20
LFI (NUPÉS)	Cédric Briolais	11,030	22.04	+3.37
LR (UDC)	Anne Cabrit	8,571	17.13	N/A
RN	Thomas Du Chalard	6,482	12.95	+5.04
REC	Philippe Chevrier	2,926	5.85	N/A
DVE	Patrice Jacono	2,329	4.65	N/A
Others	N/A	1,973	3.94	
Turnout		50,038	55.44	−0.14
2nd round result
LREM (Ensemble)	Aurore Bergé	28,169	63.27	-1.48
LFI (NUPÉS)	Cédric Briolais	16,355	36.73	N/A
Turnout		44,524	52.67	+7.66
LREM hold				

=== 2017 ===
Legislative Election 2017: Yvelines's 10th constituency
Party	Candidate	Votes	%	±%
LREM	Aurore Bergé	23,009	46.63	
VIA	Jean-Frédéric Poisson	9,434	19.12	
LFI	Benjamin Nicoletta	4,341	8.80	
FN	François Le Hot	3,902	7.91	
EELV	David Jutier	2,479	5.02	
PS	Jean-Claude Husson	2,391	4.85	
Others	N/A	3,786		
Turnout		49,342	55.58	
2nd round result
LREM	Aurore Bergé	25,868	64.75	
VIA	Jean-Frédéric Poisson	14,084	35.25	
Turnout		39,952	45.01	
LREM gain from VIA				

=== 2012 ===
Legislative Election 2012: Yvelines's 10th constituency
Party	Candidate	Votes	%	±%
EELV	Anny Poursinoff	18,369	34.67	
UMP	Jean-Frédéric Poisson	18,357	34.65	
FN	Philippe Chevrier	6,268	11.83	
FG	Claire Vignaud	2,448	4.62	
DVD	François de la Villardiere	2,322	4.38	
MoDem	Michel Lhemery	1,594	3.01	
Others	N/A	3,628		
Turnout		53,576	61.73	
2nd round result
UMP	Jean-Frédéric Poisson	28,043	53.65	
EELV	Anny Poursinoff	24,224	46.35	
Turnout		53,516	61.67	
UMP gain from EELV				

=== 2010 by-election ===
MP Christine Boutin's resignation in 2009 precipitated a by-election, which was won by UMP candidate Jean-Frédéric Poisson with a lead of just five votes over Greens candidate Anny Poursinoff. An appeal and recount led the Constitutional Council to first declare Poisson had won by just one vote, and then ultimately to order a fresh by-election which was held on the 4th and 10 July 2010. Poisson and Poursinoff again advanced to the second round, and Poursinoff was elected with a clear lead of 1,005 votes.

2010 by-election: Yvelines's 10th constituency
Party	Candidate	Votes	%	±%
EELV	Anny Poursinoff	11,420	42.60	
UMP	Jean-Frédéric Poisson	10,909	40.70	
FN	Philippe Chavrier	2,004	7.50	
PCF	Vincent Liechiti	1,085	4.00	
NM	Michel Finck	854	3.20	
Others	N/A	526		
Turnout		27,204	26.80	
2nd round result
EELV	Anny Poursinoff	15,109	51.70	
UMP	Jean-Frédéric Poisson	14,104	48.30	
Turnout		29,912	29.40	
EELV gain from UMP				

=== 2007 ===
Legislative Election 2007: Yvelines's 10th constituency
Party	Candidate	Votes	%	±%
UMP	Christine Boutin	31,614	49.23	
PS	Didier Fischer	13,777	21.46	
MoDem	Pierre Le Guerinel	7,347	11.44	
LV	Anny Poursinoff	2,434	3.79	
FN	Philippe Chevrier	2,287	3.56	
Far left	Danielle Atlan	1,482	2.31	
Others	N/A	5,272		
Turnout		65,205	64.43	
2nd round result
UMP	Christine Boutin	33,583	58.37	
PS	Didier Fischer	23,949	41.63	
Turnout		59,567	58.87	
UMP hold				

=== 2002 ===
Legislative Election 2002: Yvelines's 10th constituency
Party	Candidate	Votes	%	±%
UMP	Christine Boutin	20,674	32.48	
PS	Didier Fischer	16,318	25.63	
DVD	Alain Bricault	9,886	15.53	
FN	Philippe Chevrier	6,341	9.96	
LV	Anny Poursinoff	2,256	3.54	
PCF	Luc Miserey	1,555	2.44	
Others	N/A	6,626		
Turnout		64,595	67.84	
2nd round result
UMP	Christine Boutin	31,342	56.29	
PS	Didier Fischer	24,339	43.71	
Turnout		58,441	61.38	
UMP gain from UDF				

=== 1997 ===
Legislative Election 1997: Yvelines's 10th constituency
Party	Candidate	Votes	%	±%
UDF	Christine Boutin	16,867	28.62	
LV	Anny Poursinoff	14,290	24.25	
FN	Jacques Michel	8,311	14.10	
RPR	Henri Pailleux*	8,179	13.88	
PCF	Christian Beaumanoir	4,783	8.12	
MEI	Michel Haye	3,615	6.13	
DIV	Jean-Louis Desvaud	1,354	2.30	
Others	N/A	1,529		
Turnout		61,694	69.03	
2nd round result
UDF	Christine Boutin	33,915	54.92	
LV	Anny Poursinoff	27,844	45.08	
Turnout		65,223	73.00	
UDF hold				

== Sources ==
- Official results of French elections from 1998: "Résultats électoraux officiels en France" (in French).
