= Aurore Bergé =

French politician and Minister

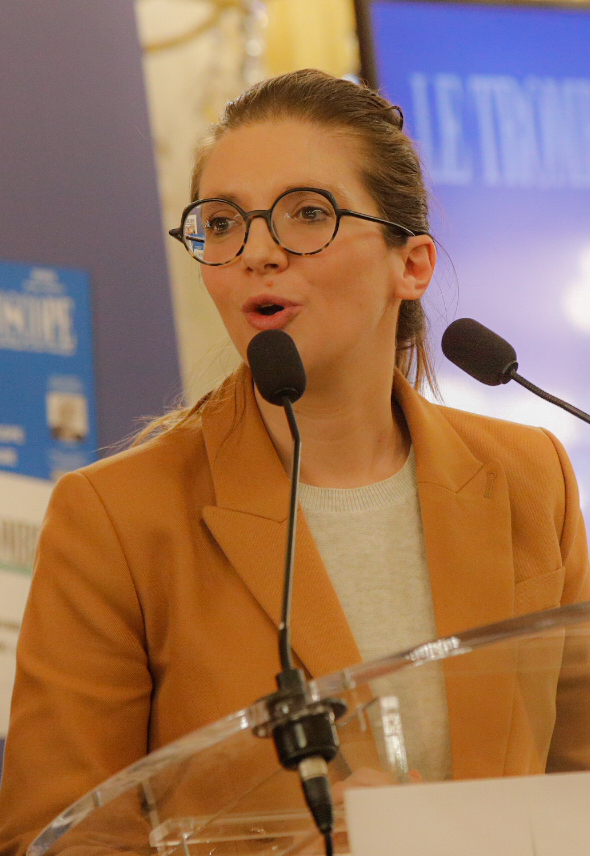
- Bergé in 2023

Minister Delegate for Equality between Women and Men and for the Fight against Discriminations (Note: Concurrently served as Spokesperson of the Government from 5 to 12 October 2025.)
- Incumbent
- Assumed office 23 December 2024
- Prime Minister: François Bayrou; Sébastien Lecornu
- Preceded by: Salima Saa
- In office 11 January 2024 – 21 September 2024
- Prime Minister: Gabriel Attal
- Preceded by: Bérangère Couillard
- Succeeded by: Salima Saa

Minister for Solidarity and Family
- In office 20 July 2023 – 11 January 2024
- Prime Minister: Élisabeth Borne
- Preceded by: Jean-Christophe Combe
- Succeeded by: Catherine Vautrin

President of the Renaissance group in the National Assembly
- In office 21 June 2022 – 20 July 2023
- Preceded by: Christophe Castaner
- Succeeded by: Sylvain Maillard

Member of the National Assembly for Yvelines's 10th constituency
- In office 21 June 2017 – 20 August 2023
- Preceded by: Jean-Frédéric Poisson
- Succeeded by: Philippe Emmanuel

Member of the Regional Council of Île-de-France
- Incumbent
- Assumed office 1 July 2021
- President: Valérie Pécresse

Personal details
- Born: 13 November 1986 (age 39) Paris, France
- Party: Renaissance (2017–present)
- Other political affiliations: UMP (2002–2015); The Republicans (2015–2017)
- Spouse: Nicolas Bays (m. 2009; div. 2015)
- Domestic partner: Grégory Besson-Moreau (2022–present)
- Children: 1
- Parent: Alain Dorval (father)
- Education: Sciences Po

Aurore Bergé (French pronunciation: [oʁɔʁ bɛʁʒe]; born 13 November 1986) is a French politician who served as Minister for Equality between Women and Men and for the Fight against Discriminations in the government of Prime Minister Gabriel Attal from January to September 2024 and again in the government of Prime Minister François Bayrou since December 2024.

Previously, Bergé represented the 10th constituency of the Yvelines department in the National Assembly since 2017. A former member of The Republicans (LR), which she left to join La République En Marche! (LREM) in early 2017, she is considered a close ally of President Emmanuel Macron. She led the party's group in the National Assembly from 2022 to 2023. From July 2023 until a government reshuffle in January 2024, she served as Minister for Solidarity and Family in the government of Prime Minister Élisabeth Borne.

== Early life and education ==
A native of Paris, Bergé is the daughter of actor Alain Dorval. She studied at Sciences Po earning her degree in 2009.

== Political career ==
In 2002, Bergé joined the Union for a Popular Movement (UMP), which became The Republicans (LR) in 2015. She has been a municipal councillor of Magny-les-Hameaux since the 2014 election. In the party primary ahead of the 2017 presidential election, she campaigned for Alain Juppé.

Bergé joined La République En Marche! in early 2017. She wrote a column published in L'Obs to explain why she switched parties. In the 2017 legislative election, she defeated incumbent Christian Democrat Jean-Frédéric Poisson in the 10th constituency of Yvelines. From 2017 until 2019, Bergé served as one of her parliamentary group's spokespersons under the leadership of its successive group chairs Richard Ferrand and Gilles Le Gendre.

In 2020, Bergé was a candidate to succeed Le Gendre as the group's chair. However, she lost against former Interior Minister Christophe Castaner. Castaner, a former member of the Socialist Party who is associated with the party's left-wing whilst Bergé is associated with its right-wing, appointed her as his deputy (alongside Coralie Dubost), with the title of group president delegate (présidente déléguée). In addition, Bergé served as member of the Committee on Cultural Affairs and Education.

From 2022 to 2023, Bergé served as chair of the Renaissance parliamentary group.

=== Ministerial appointments ===
In October 2023, Bergé participated in the first joint cabinet retreat of the German and French governments in Hamburg, chaired by Chancellor Olaf Scholz and President Emmanuel Macron.

In January 2024 Bergé was appointed the new gender equalities minister as part of the cabinet reshuffle caused by Gabriel Attal succeeding Élisabeth Borne as Prime minister.

=== False testimony accusations ===
Bergé became the target of a judicial investigation for “false testimony” opened by the Court of Justice of the Republic on Friday January 31, 2025. She was reported by the office of the National Assembly after statements made under oath before a parliamentary commission on April 30, 2024 during which she denied having close ties with a lobbyist from the private nursery industry.

== Political positions ==
In the 2012 Union for a Popular Movement leadership election, Bergé supported François Fillon as the party's leader.

In September 2018, following the appointment of François de Rugy to a ministership, Bergé supported the candidacy of Richard Ferrand for the presidency of the National Assembly.

In August 2020, Bergé was one of the LREM members who endorsed an animal welfare referendum calling a for ban on some hunting practices that are deemed "cruel".

=== Reproductive rights ===
In September 2019, alongside Guillaume Chiche, Bergé led a group of LREM members who advocated for a bioethics law extending to homosexual and single women free access to fertility treatments such as in vitro fertilisation (IVF) under France's national health insurance; it was one of the campaign promises of President Emmanuel Macron and marked the first major social reform of his five-year term.

In October 2020, Bergé was one of 48 LREM members who voted in support of a bill introduced by the Ecology Democracy Solidarity parliamentary group that would extend the legal deadline for abortion from 12 to 14 weeks of pregnancy; at the time of the vote, she took a public stand based on her own experience with abortion.

In 2022, she attracted criticism from LGBT organizations after proposing an amendment to France's constitution that would have excluded transgender men from the right to access abortion.

=== Hijab ===
In October 2019, Bergé caused controversy when she announced her intention to vote in favour of a draft law written by Éric Ciotti of The Republicans, which would ban the wearing of the hijab by women accompanying groups of students on school outings; as a response, five other LREM members – Coralie Dubost, Cécile Rilhac, Jean-Michel Mis, Stéphane Trompille and Éric Bothorel – disassociated themselves from her. In February 2022, she went against the party line again and was one of six LREM legislators who supported the Republicans’ motion for a ban on wearing hijabs in sports competitions.

== Controversies ==
=== Ligue du LOL ===
In 2010, when she was still a member of the UMP, Aurore Bergé retweeted a message stating “I hereby officially announce that I don’t give a damn”, in response to a denunciation letter alerting against the harassment practices of the group known as the “Ligue du LOL.”

The "Ligue du LOL" was an informal network, primarily composed of young journalists and media professionals, that became notorious for its coordinated harassment campaigns on social media, especially on Twitter. Members of the group would use dismissive and provocative language to mock and intimidate targets, including fellow journalists and public figures. Their actions often involved downplaying, or even ridiculing, denunciation efforts against online abuse, as well as retaliating against anyone who criticized their behavior.

=== Sharing misinformation amid Israel-Hamas War ===
During the Israel-Hamas war, Aurore Bergé was criticized for relaying unverified claims about atrocities allegedly committed by Hamas. In particular, she repeated the rumor that a baby had been burned in an oven. However, it was confirmed that there was no credible evidence to support this claim. Local authorities and experts on the ground refuted the allegation, clarifying that no such incident had occurred. Critics argue that by giving visibility to such unfounded narratives, Bergé contributed to the spread of misinformation during a highly volatile conflict.

=== Civil servant's recruitment cancelled because of her political opinions ===
In April 2024, Mediapart revealed that Aurore Bergé had canceled, against the advice of her administration, the recruitment of a senior civil servant to the position of Regional Director Delegate for Women's Rights and Equality for the Centre-Val de Loire region. Bergé, Minister for the Fight against Discrimination, justified her decision on grounds of political neutrality, given the candidate's past commitments to Génération-s, Benoît Hamon's party. Article L131-1 of the General Civil Service Code, in force since March 1, 2022, stipulates that civil servants may not be victims of direct or indirect discrimination on the grounds of their political opinions.

=== Fake news about an attack on a bakery in Strasbourg ===
On 13 April 2025, Aurore Bergé shared a video on Twitter claiming that a bakery in Strasbourg had been stormed by pro-Palestinian protesters because it was allegedly Israeli-owned. This claim was quickly denied by the Bas-Rhin prefecture and by the bakery itself, which stated that no attack had taken place and that the business had no connection to Israel or the Jewish community.

== Personal life ==
From 2009 to 2015, Bergé was married to Nicolas Bays.

Bergé has since been in a relationship with Grégory Besson-Moreau. In 2022, she gave birth to a daughter.

== See also ==
- 2017 French legislative election

=== Bibliography ===
- "Le coup de gueule des députés artificiers", in Hallier, tout feu tout flamme, Jean-Pierre Thiollet, Neva Editions, 2023, p. 51-57. ISBN 978-2-35055-309-2
