= Aube's 1st constituency =

Constituency of the National Assembly of France

1st constituency of Aube
- inline Constituency of the National Assembly of France

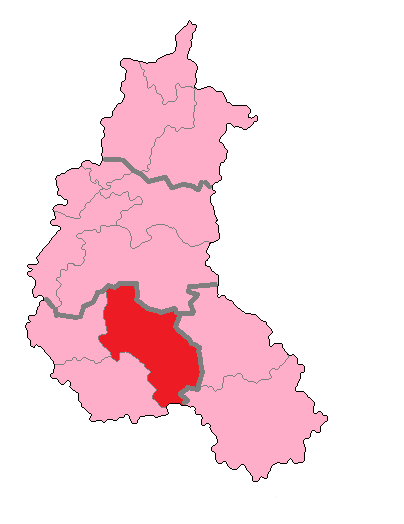
- Aube's 1st Constituency shown within Champagne-Ardenne
- Deputy: Jordan Guitton; RN
- Department: Aube
- Cantons: Arcis-sur-Aube, Bar-sur-Aube, Brienne-le-Château, Chavanges, Essoyes, Piney, Ramerupt, Soulaines-Dhuys, Troyes-1, Troyes-2, Vendeuvre-sur-Barse
- Registered voters: 64,415

The 1st constituency of Aube is a French legislative constituency in the Aube département. It is currently represented by Jordan Guitton of RN.

== Description ==
It is located in the north east of the department, encircling the town of Bar-sur-Aube, and taking in part of the town of Troyes.

== Historic Representation ==
Election	Member	Party
1958	Louis Briot	UNR
1962	Louis Briot	UNR
1967	Louis Briot	UNR
1968	Louis Briot	UDR
1973	André Gravelle	PS
1978	Pierre Micaux	UDF
1981	Pierre Micaux	UDF
1986	Proportional representation – no election by constituency	
1988	Pierre Micaux	UDF
1993	Pierre Micaux	UDF
1997	Pierre Micaux	UDF
2002	Pierre Micaux	UMP
2007	Nicolas Dhuicq	UMP
2012	Nicolas Dhuicq	UMP
2017	Grégory Besson-Moreau	LREM
2022	Jordan Guitton	RN
2024	Jordan Guitton	RN

== Election results ==
=== 2024 ===
Candidate	Party	Alliance	First round		Second round	
Candidate	Party	Alliance	Votes	%	Votes	%
Jordan Guitton	RN		22,636	53.84		
Philippe Beury	REN	Ensemble	7,898	18.79		
Alice Barry	PS	NFP	6,019	14.32		
Lionel Paillard	LO		570	1.36		
Chris Manieri-Bigorgne	LR	UDC	4,921	11.70		
Valid votes			42,044	96.67		
Blank votes			836	1.92		
Null votes			614	1.41		
Turnout			43,494	67.99		
Abstentions			20,479	32.01		
Registered voters			63,973			
Result			RN HOLD			

=== 2022 ===
Legislative Election 2022: Aube's 1st constituency
Party	Candidate	Votes	%	±%
RN	Jordan Guitton	11,406	36.31	+11.42
LREM (Ensemble)	Grégory Besson-Moreau	7,615	24.24	-5.62
LR (UDC)	Stéphanie Fraenkel	5,093	16.21	−9.48
EELV (NUPÉS)	Laurent Spagnesi	4,558	14.51	+2.44
REC	Hervé Giacomoni	1,106	3.52	N/A
DIV	Marie-Elisabeth Canaud	884	2.81	N/A
Others	N/A	753	-	−
Turnout		31,415	49.72	−2.12
2nd round result
RN	Jordan Guitton	16,093	53.89	+25.66
LREM (Ensemble)	Grégory Besson-Moreau	13,770	46.11	+9.65
Turnout		29,863	49.23	−1.25
RN gain from LR				

=== 2017 ===
Candidate	Label	First round		Second round	
Candidate	Label	Votes	%	Votes	%
Grégory Besson-Moreau	REM	9,730	29.86	11,339	36.46
Nicolas Dhuicq	LR	8,369	25.69	10,980	35.31
Bruno Subtil	FN	8,109	24.89	8,780	28.23
Michel Bach	FI	2,500	7.67		
Michel Guéritte	ECO	875	2.69		
Emmanuel Provin	DIV	852	2.61		
Marie Gatard-Lafond	PCF	558	1.71		
Ghislain Wysocinski	ECO	353	1.08		
Yves Samonati	DVD	333	1.02		
Claude Hecquet	DIV	274	0.84		
Lionel Paillard	EXG	220	0.68		
Emmanuel Chathuant	DIV	216	0.66		
Annie Darde	DIV	194	0.60		
Votes		32,583	100.00	31,099	100.00
Valid votes		32,583	97.67	31,099	95.72
Blank votes		568	1.70	1,073	3.30
Null votes		209	0.63	319	0.98
Turnout		33,360	51.84	32,491	50.48
Abstentions		30,997	48.16	31,869	49.52
Registered voters		64,357		64,360	
Source: Ministry of the Interior

=== 2012 ===
Summary of the 10 June and 17 June 2012 French legislative in Aube’s 1st Constituency election results
Candidate	Party		1st round		2nd round	
Candidate	Party		Votes	%	Votes	%
Nicolas Dhuicq	Union for a Popular Movement	UMP	13,397	35.04%	17,122	44.18%
René Gaudot	Radical Party of the Left	PRG	10,703	27.99%	12,407	32.01%
Bruno Subtil	National Front	FN	9,669	25.29%	9,226	23.81%
Pascal Landreat		CEN	2,560	6.69%		
Marie-Laurence Egmann	Ecologist	ECO	794	2.08%		
Lionel Paillard	Far Left	EXG	586	1.53%		
Elisabeth Marzé	Miscellaneous Right	DVD	529	1.38%		
Total			38,238	100%	38,755	100%
Registered voters			64,707		64,415	
Blank/Void ballots			776	1.99%	723	1.83%
Turnout			39,014	60.29%	39,478	61.29%
Abstentions			25,693	39.71%	24,937	38.71%
Result					UMP HOLD	

=== 2007 ===
Summary of the 10 June and 17 June 2007 French legislative in Aube’s 1st Constituency election results
Candidate	Party		1st round		2nd round	
Candidate	Party		Votes	%	Votes	%
Nicolas Dhuicq	Union for a Popular Movement	UMP	13,426	39.97%	19,707	60.64%
Line Bret	Socialist Party	PS	7,747	23.06%	12,793	39.36%
Marc Sebeyran	Democratic Movement	MoDem	4,314	12.84%		
Bruno Subtil	National Front	FN	3,195	9.51%		
Bruno Lebecq	Miscellaneous Right	DVD	1,155	3.44%		
Anna Zajac	Communist	COM	790	2.35%		
Pascal Houplon	The Greens	VEC	730	2.17%		
Michel Gueritte	Divers	DIV	613	1.82%		
Roselyne de Balmain	Movement for France	MPF	424	1.26%		
Monique Bonhomme	Far Left	EXG	416	1.24%		
Sébastien Fournillon	Ecologist	ECO	350	1.04%		
Guy Simard	Divers	DIV	239	0.71%		
Cathy Imberdis	Far Right	EXD	194	0.58%		
Total			33,593	100%	32,500	100%
Registered voters			58,054		58,061	
Blank/Void ballots			751	2.19%	1,171	3.48%
Turnout			34,344	59.16%	33,671	57.99%
Abstentions			23,710	40.84%	24,390	42.01%
Result					UMP HOLD	

=== 2002 ===
Legislative Election 2002: Aube's 1st constituency
Party	Candidate	Votes	%	±%
PS	Line Bret	8,133	23.37	
UMP	Pierre Micaux	7,837	22.52	
UDF	Marc Sebeyran	6,676	19.19	
FN	Bruno Subtil	6,269	18.02	
DVD	Michel Roche	3,334	9.58	
PCF	Anna Zajac	943	2.71	
LO	Monique Bonhomme	703	2.02	
Others	N/A	901		
Turnout		35,612	64.08	
2nd round result
UMP	Pierre Micaux	17,313	56.64	
PS	Line Bret	13,252	43.36	
Turnout		32,682	58.81	
UMP gain from UDF				

=== 1997 ===
Legislative Election 1997: Aube's 1st constituency
Party	Candidate	Votes	%	±%
UDF	Pierre Micaux	9,037	25.61	
PS	Marc Bret	7,936	22.49	
FN	Bruno Subtil	7,102	20.13	
UDF	Jacky Morin*	3,080	8.73	
PCF	Anna Zajac	2,099	5.95	
DVD	Pierre Pescarolo	1,848	5.24	
LO	Monique Bonhomme	1,143	3.24	
LV	Anne Fretey	880	2.49	
MPF	André Veltin	1,028	2.91	
Others	N/A	1,132		
Turnout		37,273	69.50	
2nd round result
UDF	Pierre Micaux	17,003	43.86	
PS	Marc Bret	15,112	38.98	
FN	Bruno Subtil	6,655	17.17	
Turnout		40,318	75.19	
UDF hold				

== Sources ==
- French Interior Ministry results website: "Résultats électoraux officiels en France" (in French).
