= Bertrand de La Chesnais =

French general

Bertrand Houitte de La Chesnais
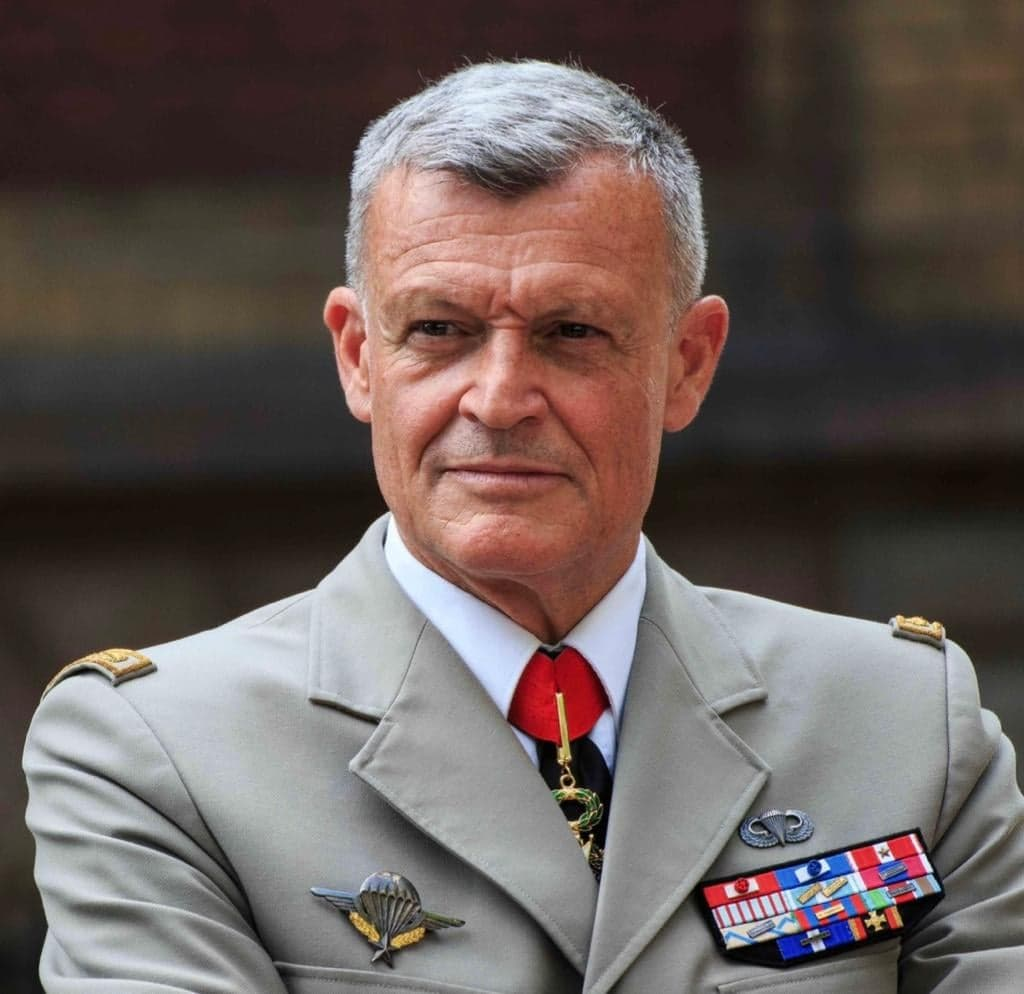
- Bertrand de La Chesnais in 2021

Major General of the Army
- In office 1 September 2014 – 31 December 2017
- Preceded by: Jean-Philippe Margueron
- Succeeded by: Bernard Barrera

Personal details
- Born: 8 February 1958 (age 68) Saint-Mandé, France
- Party: Reconquête
- Children: 5
- Parents: René Houitte de La Chesnais (father); Monique Séguineau de Préval (mother)
- Education: École Spéciale Militaire

Military service
- Allegiance: French Republic
- Branch/service: French Army: 9th Parachute Chasseur Regiment
- Years of service: 1980–2017
- Rank: Army general

Bertrand Marie Joseph Houitte de La Chesnais (born 8 February 1958) is a French politician and former paratrooper. He served as a Major General of the French Army from September 2014 to December 2017. In 2021, he was appointed the campaign manager for presidential candidate Éric Zemmour.

== Biography ==
=== Military ===
La Chesnais was born in Saint-Mandé. His father was René Houitte de La Chesnais (1923–2013), a brigadier in the French army. He attended École spéciale militaire de Saint-Cyr from 1978 to 1980 and spent 40 years in the French army, including as a paratrooper in the 9th Parachute Chasseur Regiment in which he took part in specialist operations in Sarajevo, Chad, and Kosovo. In 2014, he was elevated to the rank of Lieutenant General and appointed Major General of the Army, the deputy to the Chief of Staff of the French Army, before retiring from the military in 2017.

=== Strategic consultant ===
In July 2018, he enrolled as a senior advisor in Roland Berger strategic consulting group. He resigned in October 2021, soon after his announcement to support Éric Zemmour.

=== Politics ===
In April 2019, he announced his intention to run as an independent candidate for the mayoral election in Carpentras ahead of the 2020 French municipal elections. His candidacy was endorsed by the National Rally, CNIP and VIA, the Way of the People. Chesnais made it into the second round of voting but subsequently lost to incumbent mayor Serge Andrieu.

In October 2021, he announced his support for the potential candidacy of Éric Zemmour for the 2022 French presidential election. After Zemmour announced his intention to officially stand, Chesnais was announced as his campaign director.

=== Honours ===
Bertrand de La Chesnais has been awarded the Légion d'honneur and the ordre national du Mérite.
