= Christine Boutin =

French politician (born 1944)

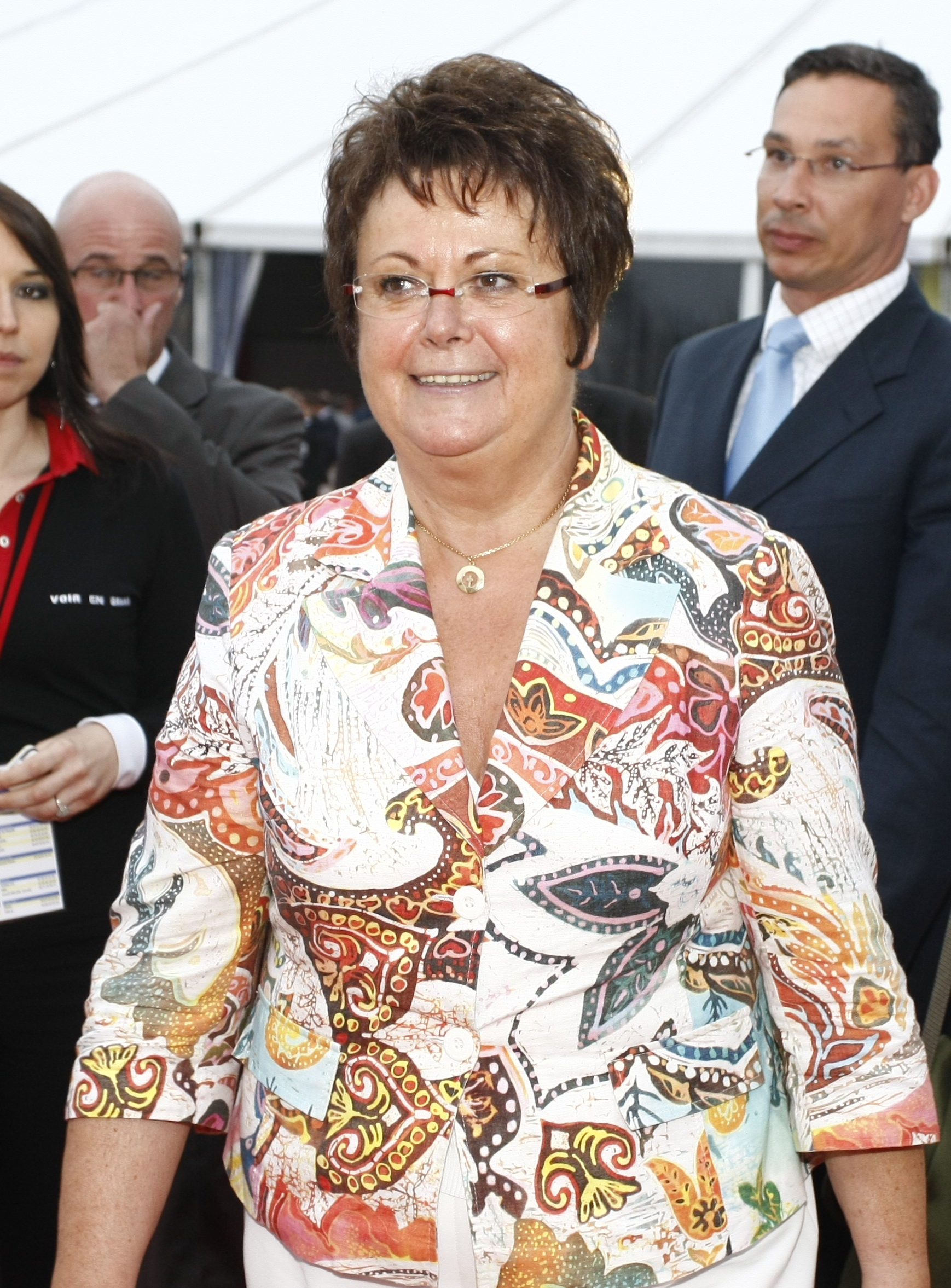
- Boutin in 2008

President of the Christian Democratic Party
- In office 20 June 2009 – 10 July 2013
- Succeeded by: Jean-Frédéric Poisson

Minister of Housing and Urban Development
- In office 18 May 2007 – 23 June 2009
- President: Nicolas Sarkozy
- Prime Minister: François Fillon
- Preceded by: Nathalie Kosciusko-Morizet
- Succeeded by: Jean-Louis Borloo

Deputy of Yvelines's 10th constituency
- In office 2 April 1986 – 19 July 2007
- Succeeded by: Jean-Frédéric Poisson

Personal details
- Born: Christine Martin; 6 February 1944 (age 82) Levroux, France
- Party: Reconquête (2022–present)
- Other political affiliations: Christian Democratic Party (till 2022)
- Spouse: Louis Boutin (m. 1967)
- Children: 3

Christine Boutin (French: [kʁistin butɛ̃]; born 6 February 1944) is a French former politician leading the small French Christian Democratic Party. She served as a member of the French National Assembly representing Yvelines, from 1986 until 2007, when she was appointed Minister of Housing and Urban Development by President Nicolas Sarkozy. She was a candidate in the 2002 French presidential election, in which she scored 1.19% on the first round of balloting.

Boutin was the leader of the Christian Democratic Party (Parti Chrétien-démocrate), a socially conservative Christian-democratic party, which is associated with the greater UMP union party. She is best known for her very vocal opposition to civil unions in 1998 and same-sex marriage later on.

She announced on 21 October 2017 that she was leaving politics, resigning as departmental councillor for Yvelines.

== Biography ==
Boutin was born in Levroux, Indre. She married her cousin Louis Boutin in 1967 with whom she had three children (the contradiction between her strong advocacy of Catholic dogmas and marrying one's first cousin remaining strictly forbidden by canon law is often pointed out). She entered politics in 1977 as a city council member of the village of Auffargis. In 1980 she was elected its mayor. Boutin was elected to the National Assembly in 1986.

In 1993, Boutin founded the anti-abortion NGO Alliance pour les droits de la vie (ADV) (English: Alliance for Human Life), considered the largest anti-abortion organization in France. The same year, she became a consultant for the Pontifical Council for the Family headed by Cardinal Lopez-Trujillo. In 1998, Boutin became somewhat famous because of a five-hour speech in opposition to the PACS domestic partnership plan, arguing that its adoption by the government would encourage homosexuality. She held a Bible during the speech, an image which would later become associated with her.

In 2002, Boutin who had been a member of the UDF party, joined the UMP when it was founded. In a UMP rally that same year, where Boutin spoke, ACT UP Paris protested with a banner calling Boutin homophobic.

In 2006, Boutin supported the "global license" flat-fee authorization for sharing of copyrighted files over the Internet in a heated parliamentary debate on the DADVSI law. She also has been an advocate for a guaranteed minimum income, as well as expanded housing rights (Droit au logement). She has considered the situation of prisons in France to be a scandal and has argued for a drastic reduction of inmates as well as improving their life-conditions.

In December 2006, Boutin announced that she would not be a candidate for the 2007 French Presidential election and pledged her support for the Conservative candidate Nicolas Sarkozy.

In a November 2006 interview, published in 2007, Boutin stated that President of the United States George W. Bush might have been behind the September 11 attacks. When asked if she believed that the Bush administration was behind the 9/11 attacks, Boutin replied: "I think that it's possible... I think it is possible. I think it more especially as I know that the sites that speak of this problem are the sites that have the greatest numbers of visits.... And so, I tell myself, I who am extremely sensitive ... to the new techniques of information and communication, that this expression of the mass of the people cannot be without any truth. I'm not telling you that I adhere to that position, but let's say that, nevertheless, I'm questioning myself a bit on this question."

On 18 May 2007, after Sarkozy's victory in the presidential election, Boutin was named Minister of Housing and the City in the government of Prime Minister François Fillon. She has taken as advisors the anti-abortion activist Christine de Chefdebien, controversial for a 1992 anti-abortion occupation of a hospital, and the priest Jean-Marie Petitclerc.

Boutin has a liberal view on condom use in Africa to prevent AIDS, saying that contraceptives were necessary, appearing to contradict an earlier view by Pope Benedict XVI. She has however been critical of contraception outside of the AIDS context in Africa. In October 2012, Christine Boutin stated that she remained strongly opposed to same-sex marriage, claiming that it would lead to polygamy. Around the same time, it was also revealed that she received €800,000 from the UMP before deciding not to run for the forthcoming presidential election against its candidate, Nicolas Sarkozy. On a tweet of 14 May 2013 she derided Angelina Jolie's cancer prevention treatment as a sex reassignment procedure; her tweet was widely criticized, but she has not apologized.

In 2014, Christine Boutin launched the "Force Vie" list for the 2014 European elections, and failed to secure the 3% of votes required for reimbursement of campaign expenses in any constituency.

In a judgement dated 18 December 2015 the correctional court of Paris condemned Boutin to a fine of €5000 and €2000 for legal damages for having said that homosexuality was an abomination. The verdict is being appealed.

In the second round of the 2017 French presidential election, she supported Marine Le Pen.

In 2022, Christine Boutin announced that she was supporting Éric Zemmour and had joined Reconquête.

== Political functions ==
Governmental function

Minister of Housing and Urban : 2007–2009.

Electoral mandates

National Assembly of France

Member of the National Assembly of France for Yvelines : 1986–2007 (Became minister in 2007). Elected in 1986, reelected in 1988, 1993, 1997, 2002, 2007.

General Council

President of the General Council of Yvelines (interim) : May–July 2009.

Vice-president of the General Council of Yvelines : 1994–2009 (Resignation). Reelected in 2001, 2008.

General councillor of Yvelines : 1982–2009 (Resignation). Reelected in 1988, 1994, 2001, 2008.

Municipal Council

Mayor of Auffargis : 1980–1983.

Municipal councillor of Auffargis : 1977–1983

Deputy-mayor of Rambouillet : 1983–2001. Reelected in 1989, 1995.

Municipal councillor of Rambouillet : 1983–2001. Reelected in 1989, 1995.

== See also ==
- Reconquête
- Pro-life movement
