= 2016 The Republicans (France) presidential primary =

Presidential primary election in France

The Republicans presidential primary, 2016
- 20–27 November 2016
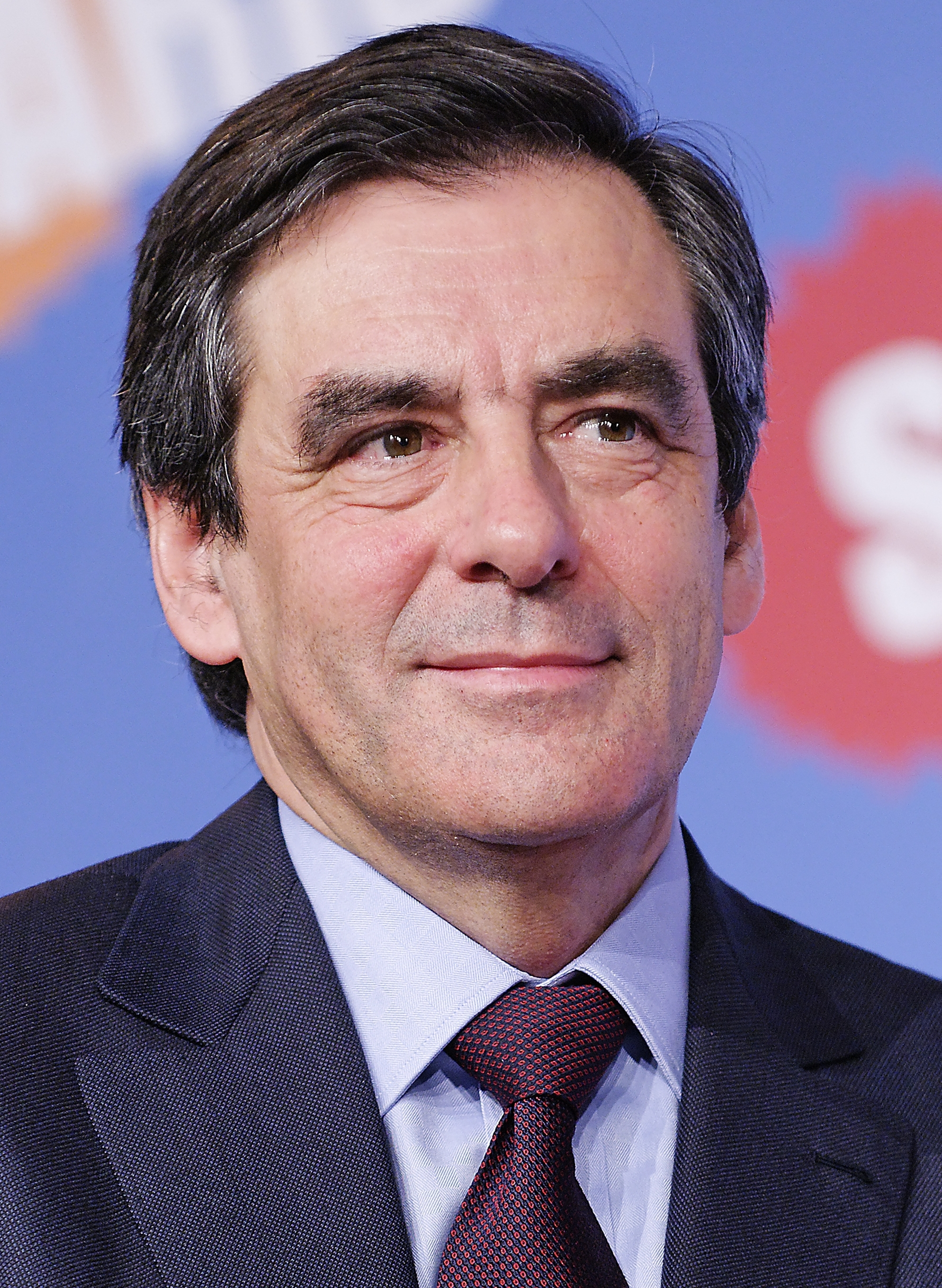

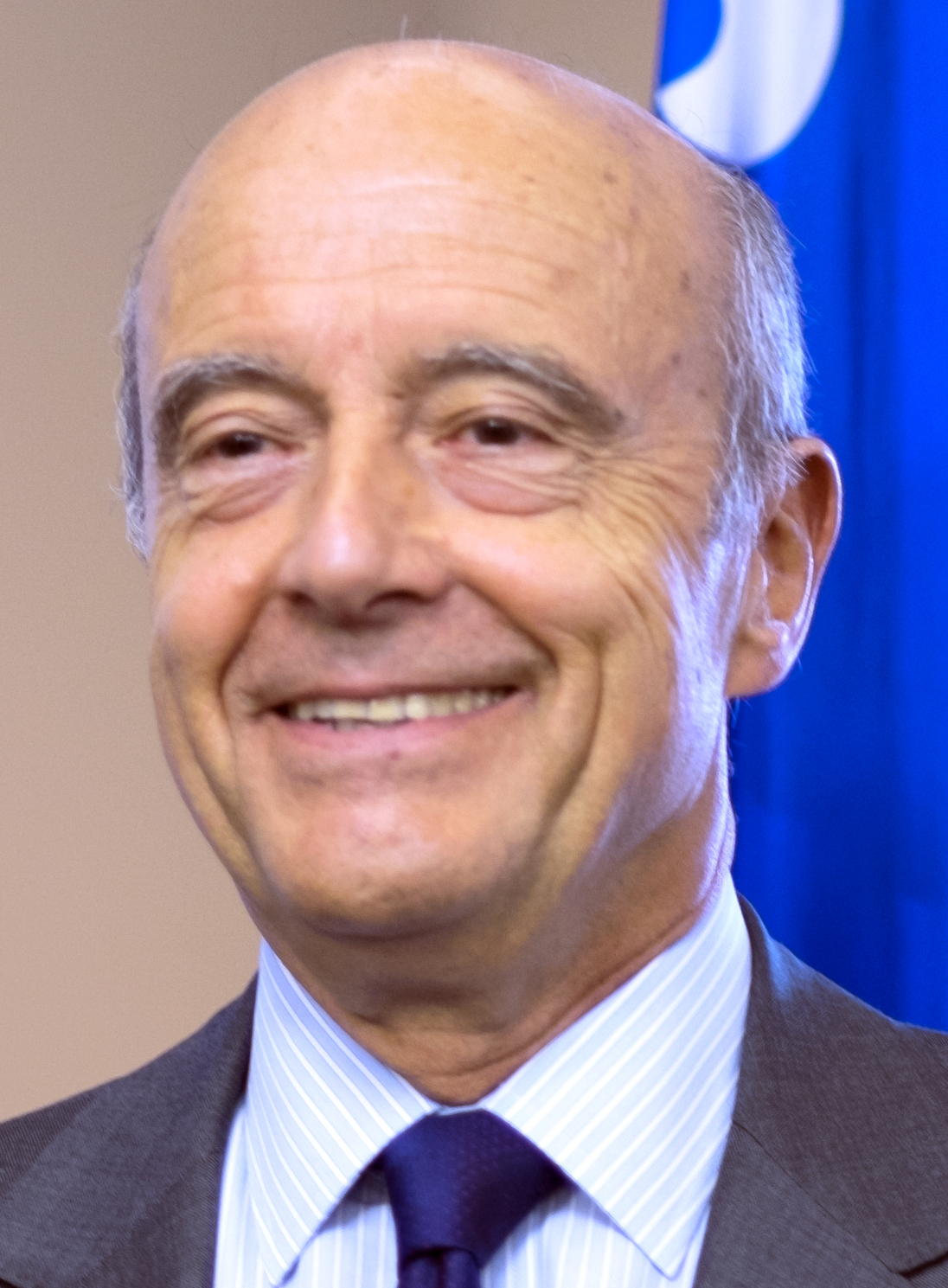
Candidate	François Fillon	Alain Juppé
Party	LR	LR
Popular vote (1st)	1,890,266	1,224,855
Share (1st)	44.08%	28.56%
Popular vote (2nd)	2,919,874	1,471,898
Share (2nd)	66.49%	33.51%
- Results of the first round by department and region

- Results of the second round by department and region
Previous UMP nominee
Nicolas Sarkozy
LR nominee
François Fillon

The Republicans held a presidential primary election, officially called the open primary of the right and centre (French: primaire ouverte de la droite et du centre), to select a candidate for the 2017 presidential election. It took place on 20 November 2016, with a runoff on 27 November since no candidate obtained at least 50% of the vote in the first round. It was the first time an open primary had been held for The Republicans or its predecessor parties.

In the first round of The Republicans primary on 20 November, François Fillon won an upset victory with 44% of the vote, while Alain Juppé—long held by most opinion polls as the favourite to win the nomination—came in a distant second with 29%. Former President Nicolas Sarkozy, who was projected to come in second behind Juppé, was eliminated with just under 21% of the vote.

In the runoff round, Fillon won by an even larger margin with nearly twice as many votes as Juppé (66.5% to 33.5%). Of the six departments and similar areas won by Sarkozy in the first round, all switched to Fillon in the runoff. Similarly, of the thirteen departments and similar areas that originally voted for Juppé, eight switched to Fillon in the second round. The constituency for French residents overseas was won by Juppé in the first round and Fillon in the second round.

== Voting procedures ==
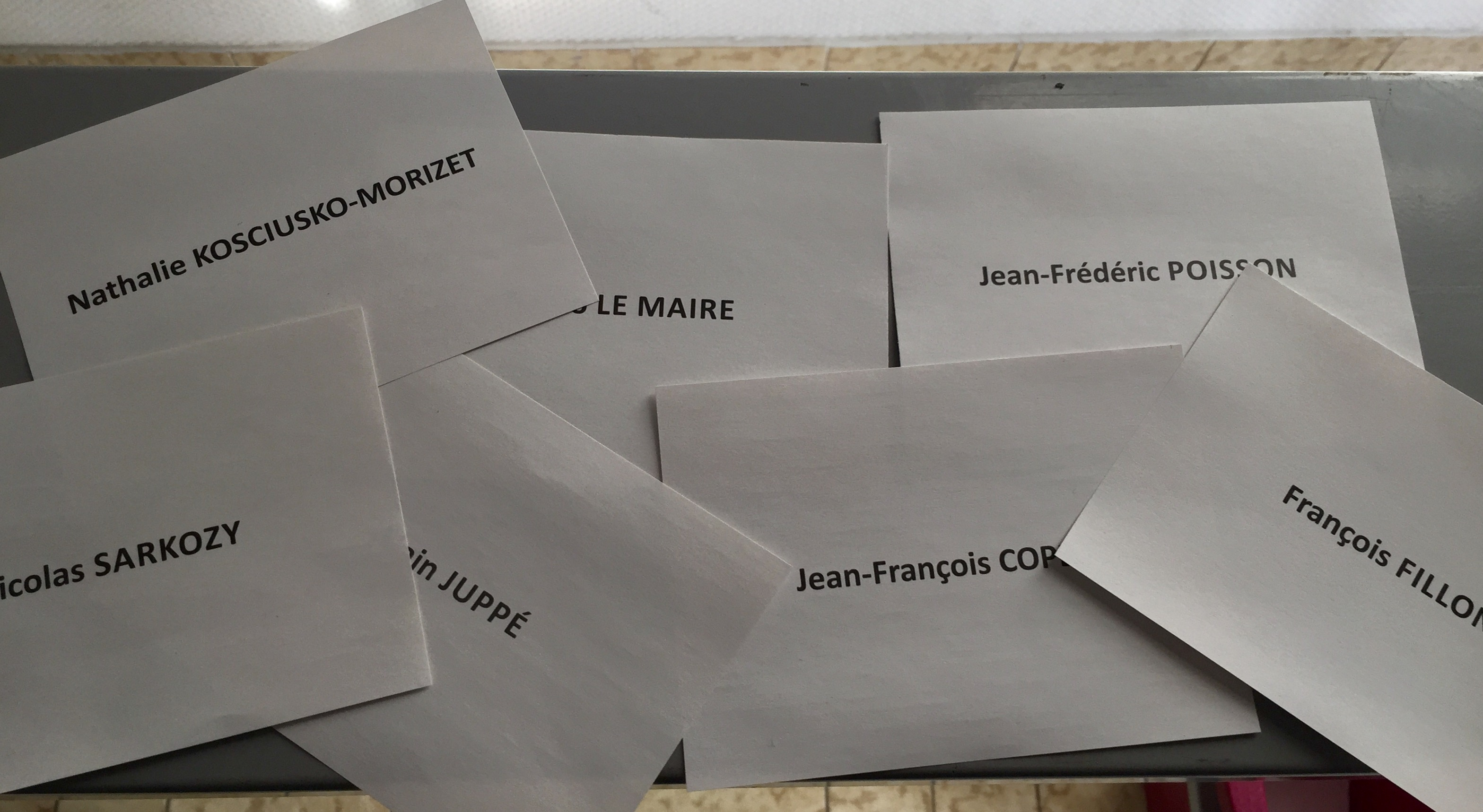
Ballot papers used in the first round

Unlike previous Union for a Popular Movement primaries, this was the first primary to be open to the general public. The first round of voting took place on 20 November 2016. Voting booths were open from 7 a.m. to 8 p.m. A runoff was held on 27 November after no candidate obtained at least 50% of the vote in the first round.

All registered voters were allowed to vote in the primary, as well as minors whose eighteenth birthday was before 23 April 2017. 10,228 voting booths were established with each person on the voting register attached to an office. To receive a ballot, a voter must pay 2 euros.

People abroad who wanted to vote in The Republicans party were given electronic voting machines to do so.

== Candidates ==
Candidates from The Republicans had to obtain the support of 20 members of the National Assembly, 2,500 party members and 250 elected representatives to participate. For candidates from other parties, the party themselves would decide the conditions for their submission into the primary. Seven candidates were accepted by the High Authority on September 6, 2016:

=== Validated candidates ===
Name, age	Details and notes
Jean-François Copé (62)	President of the UMP 2012–2014; General Secretary of the UMP 2010–2012; Mayor of Meaux since 2005 and 1995–2002; Minister of the Budget 2005–2007; Member of the National Assembly for Seine-et-Marne's 6th constituency since 2002; Copé announced his candidacy on 14 February 2016 at 20:00 on France 2 – while Nicolas Sarkozy was speaking on TF1 – a few weeks after the release of his book The French Start. After nearly 18 months of media silence, Copé said he was "ready" to return to center stage. Copé was quoted on France 2 as "being very hypocritical to delay unnecessarily", even when a judge's decision on the "sad Bygmalion case" arrived the previous Monday. Copé had been placed under attended witness status and thus escaped indictment.
François Fillon (72)	Prime Minister of France 2007–2012; Minister of Ecology, Sustainable Development, Transport and Housing 2012–2012; Minister of National Education 2004–2005; Minister of Social Affairs 2002–2004; Member of the National Assembly for Paris' 2nd constituency since 2012; Senator for Sarthe 2005–2007; Fillon announced his candidacy in April 2015 by declaring that he is "a candidate to bring a project of rupture and progress around an ambition to make France the first European power in ten years". He announced in January 2016 that he would leave politics if he fails to win the primary. Fillon had also committed, as Alain Juppé did, to serve only one term if he was elected President in 2017.
Alain Juppé (81)	Prime Minister of France 1995–1997; Minister of Foreign and European Affairs 2011–2012 and 1993–1995; Minister of Defence and Veterans Affairs 2010–2011; Minister of Ecology, Energy, Sustainable Development and Sea 2007–2007; Mayor of Bordeaux since 2006 and 1995–2004; Government Spokesperson 1986–1988; Minister of the Budget 1986–1988; Juppé announced his intention to contest the 2016 Republicans (formerly UMP) internal election, which decided who will be the candidate of the right-wing for the 2017 presidential election, on 20 August 2014. The most popular politician in France, he is described by The Daily Telegraph as "a consensual conservative seen as less divisive than Nicolas Sarkozy".
Nathalie Kosciusko-Morizet (53)	Member of the National Assembly for Essonne's 4th constituency since 2012 and 2002–2007; Mayor of Longjumeau 2008–2013; Minister of Ecology, Sustainable Development, Transport and Housing 2010–2012; Kosciusko-Morizet declared her candidacy on 8 March 2016, on the occasion of the International Women's Day, stating that "I think we can finally change politics. I am a candidate to give everyone, every French person, control of their life."
Bruno Le Maire (57)	Member of the French National Assembly for Eure since 2012; French Minister of Agriculture 2009–2012; Le Maire officially declared his candidacy at a public meeting in Vesoul on 23 February 2016. "My decision is simple, strong, unwavering. Yes, I am a candidate for president," he said on stage. Le Maire had earlier left little doubt about his participation in the primary. "If I told you that I was not getting ready for the primary, I would be lying. And I do not like to lie," he had said on RTL 4 in January. In the wake of his candidacy, Bruno Le Maire has also released a book about his vision of France entitled Do Not Resign. He already enjoyed broad support, including that of Michel Barnier and Yves Jégo, even as the UDI had not yet decided on its participation in the primary.
Jean-Frédéric Poisson (63)	President of the Christian Democratic Party since 2013; Member of the National Assembly for Yvelines since 2012; As head of the Christian Democratic Party, he was their candidate in the centre-right's 2016 primary.
Nicolas Sarkozy (71)	President of France and Co-Prince of Andorra 2007–2012; Minister of the Interior 2005–2007; Minister of Finance March 2004–November 2004; Mayor of Neuilly-sur-Seine 1983-2002; Sarkozy announced his intention to contest the primary on 22 August 2016.

=== Withdrawn candidates ===
- Xavier Bertrand, President of the Regional Council of Hauts-de-France since 2016, former Mayor of Saint-Quentin from 2010-2016; former Minister of Labour, Employment and Health from 2010–2012; former Secretary-General of the UMP from 2008–2010
- Christian Estrosi, President of the Regional Council of Provence-Alpes-Côte d'Azur since 2015; Mayor of Nice since 2008; former Deputy Minister of Industry from 2009–2010; former Deputy Minister of Overseas France from 2007–2008; former Deputy Minister of Planning of the Territory from 2005–2007

== Opinion polls ==
=== First round ===
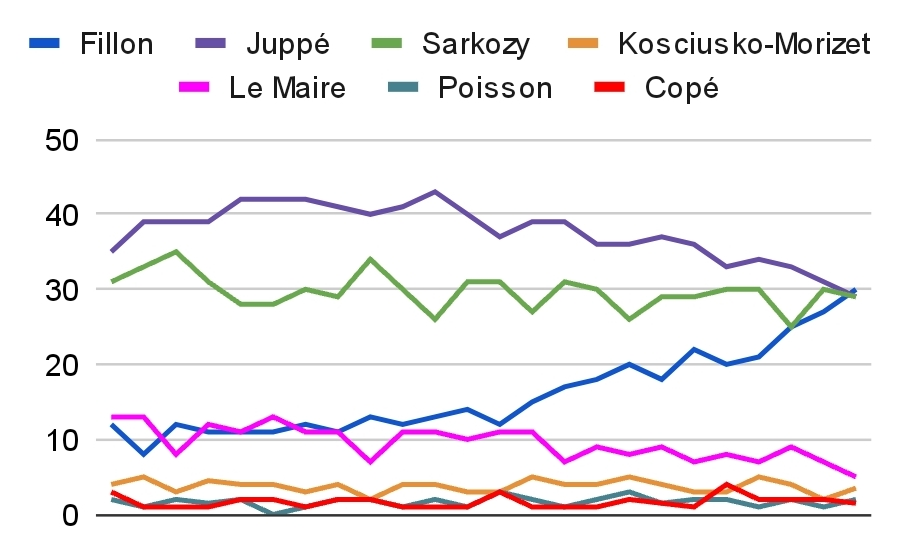
Graphical summary of the polling for the first round

Poll source	Date(s) administered	Sample size						
			Fillon UMP/LR	Juppé UMP/LR	Kosciusko-Morizet UMP/LR	Le Maire UMP/LR	Sarkozy UMP/LR	Others/Undecided
Le Parisien/i-Télé-CQFD	5–6 Jun 2014	988	13%	19%	–	–	28%	40%
Ifop	13–16 Apr 2015	704	5%	33%	–	12%	42%	8%
Ifop	4–9 Jun 2015	1,879	7%	42%	–	13%	33%	5%
Ipsos	25–31 Aug 2015	519	11%	40%	–	11%	34%	4%
Ifop	3–4 Sep 2015	1,079	9%	30%	3%	–	21%	37%
Ifop	25 Sep–9 Oct 2015	5,220	8%	37%	2%	6%	37%	10%
BVA/Presse Régionale	6–15 Oct 2015	11,244	8%	31%	2%	11%	38%	10%
Ifop	9 Oct-16 Nov 2015	5,274	9%	35%	2%	9%	34%	11%
Opinion Way	26 Oct–17 Nov 2015	400	21%	29%	–	10%	11%	29%
Ifop	16 Dec 2015–7 Jan 2016	5,989	12%	38%	4%	12%	29%	5%
Ifop	11-22 Jan 2016	4,974	12%	41%	2%	10%	30%	5%
Ipsos-Sopra Steria	22-31 Jan 2016	1,333	9%	44%	2%	11%	32%	2%
BVA/Orange et iTélé	11-12 Feb 2016	1,053	11%	47%	9%	10%	11%	12%
Ifop	1-15 Feb 2016	4,967	11%	39%	3%	11%	32%	7%
Elabe/BFMTV	16 Feb-16 Mar 2016	5,001	11%	41%	4%	13%	23%	8%
Odoxa/Le Parisien	18 Feb-10 Mar 2016	4,036	9%	41%	3%	16%	23%	8%
Ifop	23 Feb-18 Mar 2016	8,090	8%	38%	3%	16%	27%	8%
Ifop	29 Mar-14 Apr 2016	5,775	15%	37%	3%	12%	26%	7%
Odoxa/Le Parisien	17 Mar-29 Apr 2016	1,660	9%	41%	4%	15%	24%	7%
Ifop	28 Apr-20 May 2016	8,604	12%	35%	4%	13%	27%	9%
Opinion Way	19–23 May 2016	808	13%	39%	3%	13%	27%	5%
Odoxa	9 Jun 2016	1,033	9%	28%	–	7%	54%	2%
Ifop	25 May–17 Jun 2016	1,037	11%	35%	4%	13%	28%	9%
Ipsos	17–26 Jun 2016	1,234	9%	38%	2%	16%	30%	5%
Elabe	17 May–29 Jun 2016	624	11%	39%	2%	12%	29%	7%
Harris Interactive	12-14 Sept 2016	563	10%	37%	3%	9%	37%	4%
Ipsos	9–18 Sept 2016	1,216	10%	37%	4%	13%	33%	3%
Ifop	22 Aug–5 Sept 2016	620	10%	35%	4%	10%	33%	8%
BVA	13–20 Sept 2016	774	11%	38%	4%	11%	34%	2%
Ifop	9–26 Sept 2016	527	12%	35%	4%	13%	31%	5%
Kantar Sofres	21-26 Sept 2016	561	8%	39%	4%	13%	33%	3%
Harris Interactive	3–5 Oct 2016	651	12%	39%	3%	8%	35%	3%
Odoxa	1 Sept–6 Oct 2016	680	11%	39%	4.5%	12%	31%	2.5%
Kantar Sofres	30 Sept–6 Oct 2016	586	11%	42%	4%	11%	28%	4%
Odoxa	10–20 Oct 2016	621	11%	43%	4%	13%	26%	3%
Harris Interactive	7–9 Nov 2016	975	17%	39%	4%	7%	31%	2%
Kantar Sofres	7–10 Nov 2016	714	18%	36%	4%	9%	30%	3%
Odoxa	9–11 Nov 2016	554	20%	36%	5%	8%	26%	5%
BVA	3–13 Nov 2016	928	18%	37%	4%	9%	29%	3%
Ipsos Sopra-Steria	8–13 Nov 2016	1,337	22%	36%	3%	7%	29%	3%
Ifop	31 Oct–14 Nov 2016	647	20%	33%	3%	8%	30%	6%
Elabe	9–15 Nov 2016	680	21%	34%	5%	7%	30%	3%
Opinion Way	13–15 Nov 2016	828	25%	33%	4%	9%	25%	4%
Ifop	10–17 Nov 2016	744	27%	31%	2%	7%	30%	3%
Ipsos	18 Nov 2016	807	30%	29%	3.5%	5%	29%	3.5%
First round results	20 November 2016	–	44.1%	28.6%	2.6%	2.4%	20.7%	1.8%

=== Second round ===
==== Polls conducted prior to the first round ====
Poll source	Date(s) administered	Sample size			
Poll source	Date(s) administered	Sample size	Juppé LR	Fillon LR	Undecided
Odoxa/Le Parisien	17 Mar-29 Apr 2016	1,660	72%	28%	–
Opinion Way	19–23 May 2016	808	66%	34%	–

==== Polls conducted after the first round ====
Poll source	Date(s) administered	Sample size			
Poll source	Date(s) administered	Sample size	Juppé LR	Fillon LR	Undecided
Opinion Way	20 Nov 2016	3,095	44%	56%	–
Ifop-Fiducial	21-23 Nov 2016	6,901	35%	65%	–
Second round results	27 November 2016	–	33.5%	66.5%	–

==== Hypothetical Polling ====
Hypothetical polling

Juppé-Sarkozy

Poll source	Date(s) administered	Sample size			
Poll source	Date(s) administered	Sample size	Juppé UMP/LR	Sarkozy UMP/LR	Undecided
Ipsos	25–31 Aug 2015	519	56%	44%	–
Ifop	3–4 Sep 2015	1,079	33%	54%	13%
Ifop	25 Sep–9 Oct 2015	5,220	30%	54%	16%
BVA/Presse Régionale	6–15 Oct 2015	11,244	48%	52%	–
Ifop	11-22 Jan 2016	4,974	62%	38%	–
BVA/Orange et iTélé	11-12 Feb 2016	1,053	59%	41%	–
Ifop	1-15 Feb 2016	4,967	59%	41%	–
Elabe/BFMTV	16 Feb-16 Mar 2016	5,001	64%	36%	–
Ifop	23 Feb-18 Mar 2016	8,090	62%	38%	–
Ifop	29 Mar-14 Apr 2016	5,775	61%	39%	–
Odoxa/Le Parisien	17 Mar-29 Apr 2016	1,660	63%	37%	–
Ifop	28 Apr-20 May 2016	8,604	59%	41%	–
Opinion Way	19–23 May 2016	808	63%	37%	–
Ifop	25 May-17 Jun 2016	1,037	60%	40%	–
Elabe	17 May–29 Jun 2016	624	59%	41%	–
Ifop	22 Aug–5 Sept 2016	620	54%	46%	–
Harris Interactive Archived 2016-09-20 at the Wayback Machine	12–14 Sept 2016	563	52%	48%	–
Ipsos	9–18 Sept 2016	1,216	56%	44%	–
BVA	13–20 Sept 2016	798	56%	44%	–
Ifop	9–26 Sept 2016	527	57%	43%	–
Kantar Sofres	21–26 Sept 2016	561	59%	41%	–
Harris Interactive Archived 2016-10-09 at the Wayback Machine	3–5 Oct 2016	651	53%	47%	–
Odoxa	1 Sept–6 Oct 2016	680	59.5%	40.5%	–
Kantar Sofres	30 Sept–6 Oct 2016	586	62%	38%	
Odoxa	10–20 Oct 2016	621	65%	35%	–
Harris Interactive Archived 2016-11-12 at the Wayback Machine	7–9 Nov 2016	975	58%	42%	–
Kantar Sofres Archived 2016-11-16 at the Wayback Machine	7–10 Nov 2016	714	59%	41%	–
Odoxa	9–11 Nov 2016	554	58%	42%	–

Juppé-Le Maire

Poll source	Date(s) administered	Sample size			
Poll source	Date(s) administered	Sample size	Juppé UMP/LR	Le Maire UMP/LR	Undecided
Odoxa/Le Parisien	17 Mar-29 Apr 2016	1,660	66%	34%	–
Opinion Way	19–23 May 2016	808	67%	33%	–

Sarkozy-Le Maire

Poll source	Date(s) administered	Sample size			
Poll source	Date(s) administered	Sample size	Sarkozy UMP/LR	Le Maire UMP/LR	Undecided
Opinion Way	19–23 May 2016	808	46%	54%	–

Sarkozy-Fillon

Poll source	Date(s) administered	Sample size			
Poll source	Date(s) administered	Sample size	Sarkozy UMP/LR	Fillon UMP/LR	Undecided
Opinion Way	19–23 May 2016	808	47%	53%	–

Le Maire-Fillon

Poll source	Date(s) administered	Sample size			
Poll source	Date(s) administered	Sample size	Le Maire UMP/LR	Fillon UMP/LR	Undecided
Opinion Way	19–23 May 2016	808	50%	50%	–

== Results ==
In the first round of the primary on November 20, Fillon won an upset victory with 44% of the vote, while Juppé – long held by most opinion polls as the favorite to win the nomination – came in a distant second with 29%. Sarkozy, who was projected to come in second behind Juppé, was eliminated with just under 21% of the vote. In his concession speech, Sarkozy endorsed Fillon and vowed to "embark on a life with more private passions and fewer public passions." This led to some media outlets declaring that "Sarkozy's political career [had] been effectively ended."

In the runoff round, Fillon won by an even larger margin with nearly twice as many votes as Juppé (66.5% to 33.5%). Of the five departments won by Sarkozy in the first round, all but one switched to Fillon in the runoff. Similarly, of the thirteen departments that originally voted for Juppé, nine switched to Fillon in the second round.

Summary of The Republicans 20 and 27 November 2016 presidential primary
Candidates	Parties		1st round		2nd round	
Candidates	Parties		Votes	%	Votes	%
François Fillon	The Republicans	LR	1,890,266	44.1%	2,919,874	66.5%
Alain Juppé	The Republicans	LR	1,224,855	28.6%	1,471,898	33.5%
Nicolas Sarkozy	The Republicans	LR	886,137	20.7%		
Nathalie Kosciusko-Morizet	The Republicans	LR	109,655	2.6%		
Bruno Le Maire	The Republicans	LR	102,168	2.4%		
Jean-Frédéric Poisson	Christian Democratic Party	PCD	62,346	1.5%		
Jean-François Copé	The Republicans	LR	12,787	0.3%		
Total			4,288,214	100%	4,391,772	100%
Valid votes			4,288,214	99.8%	4,391,772	99.7%
Spoilt and null votes			9,883	0.2%	13,040	0.3%
Total			4,298,097	100%	4,404,812	100%
Table of results ordered by number of votes received in first round. Official results by High Authority. Source: First round result Archived 2016-11-24 at the Wayback Machine · Second round result

== See also ==
- Socialist Party (France) presidential primary, 2017
