= Stéphane Trompille =

French politician

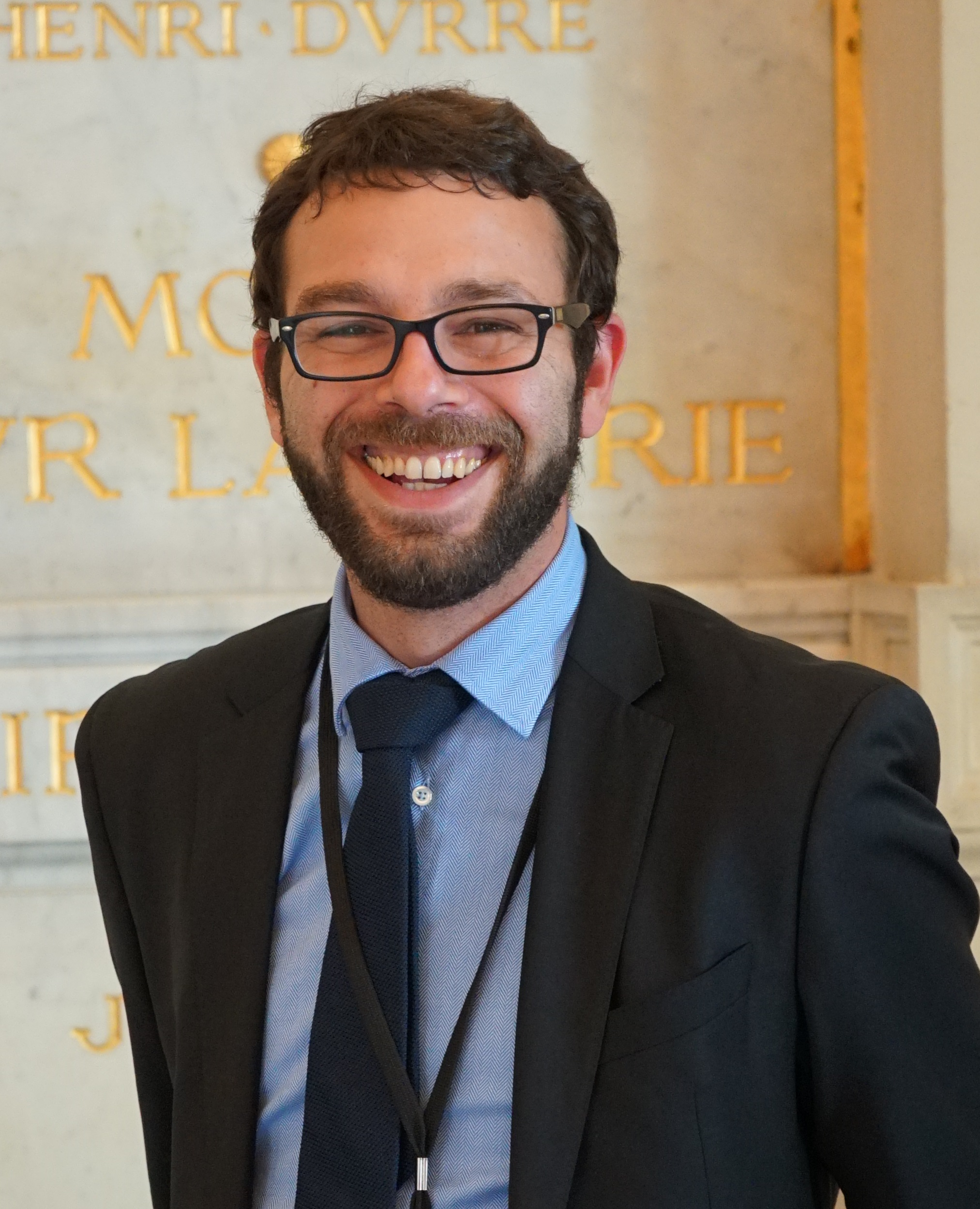

Member of the French National Assembly for Ain's 4th constituency
- In office 21 June 2017 – 21 June 2022
- Preceded by: Michel Voisin
- Succeeded by: Jérôme Buisson

Personal details
- Born: 1 December 1982 (age 43) Bourg-en-Bresse, France
- Party: La République En Marche!

Stéphane Trompille (born 1 December 1982) is a French politician of La République En Marche! (LREM) who served as a member of the French National Assembly from 2017 to 2022, representing the department of Ain.

== Political career ==
Having previously been an active member of the Socialist Party, Trompille joined LREM in 2017.

In parliament, Trompille served as member of the Committee on National Defense and the Armed Forces. In this capacity, he co-authored (with Olivier Becht) a parliamentary report on space defence in 2019, calling on the Ministry of the Armies to upgrade its capabilities given the proliferation of competitors and potential enemies. In late 2019, he was one of 17 members of the committee who co-signed a letter to Prime Minister Édouard Philippe in which they warned that the 365 million euro ($406 million) sale of aerospace firm Groupe Latécoère to U.S. fund Searchlight Capital raised "questions about the preservation of know-how and France's defense industry base" and urged government intervention.

In addition to his committee assignments, Trompille was part of the Assembly's delegation to the NATO Parliamentary Assembly.

On 25 May 2020, Trompille was convicted of sexual harassment by the Labour Court of Bourg-en-Bresse.

Trompille lost his seat in the first round of the 2022 French legislative election.

== Political positions ==
In July 2019, Trompille voted in favor of the French ratification of the European Union's Comprehensive Economic and Trade Agreement (CETA) with Canada.

Along with four other LREM members – Cécile Rilhac, Jean-Michel Mis, Coralie Dubost, and Eric Bothorel –, Trompille disassociated himself from their colleague Aurore Bergé when the latter announced her intention in October 2019 to vote for a Republican draft law banning the wearing of the hijab by women accompanying groups of students on school outings.

== See also ==
- 2017 French legislative election
