= Michel Voisin =

French politician (born 1944)

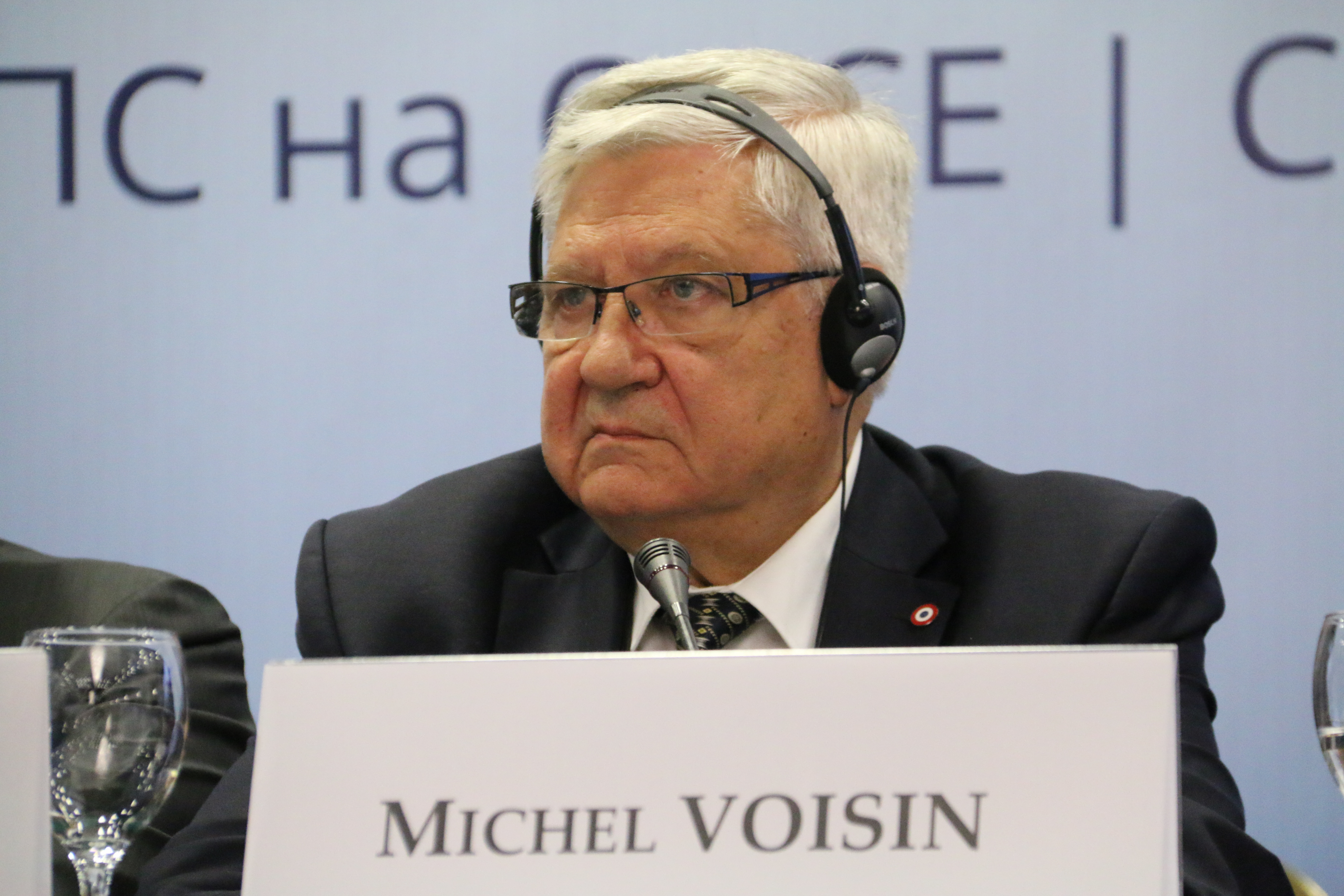
- Voisin in 2016

Member of the French National Assembly for Ain's 4th constituency
- In office 23 June 1988 – 20 June 2017
- Preceded by: Constituency created
- Succeeded by: Stéphane Trompille

Member of the Regional council of Auvergne-Rhône-Alpes
- In office 2 April 2004 – 4 January 2016
- President: Jean-Jack Queyranne

Mayor of Replonges
- In office 14 March 1983 – 4 April 2014
- Preceded by: Amédé Chambard
- Succeeded by: Bertrand Vernoux

Personal details
- Born: 6 October 1944 (age 82) Replonges, France

Michel Voisin (born 6 October 1944) is a former member of the National Assembly of France. He represented the 4th constituency of the Ain department, and is a member of The Republicans.
