= Jordan Guitton =

French politician

- Parliamentary group: RN

Deputy for Aube's 1st constituency in the National Assembly of France
- Incumbent
- Assumed office 27 June 2022
- Preceded by: Grégory Besson-Moreau

Personal details
- Born: 30 January 1995 (age 31) Troyes, Aube
- Party: RN

Jordan Guitton (born 30 January 1995) is a French politician from the National Rally who was elected member of the National Assembly for Aube's 1st constituency in the 2022 French legislative election.
