= Jérôme Buisson =

French politician and educator

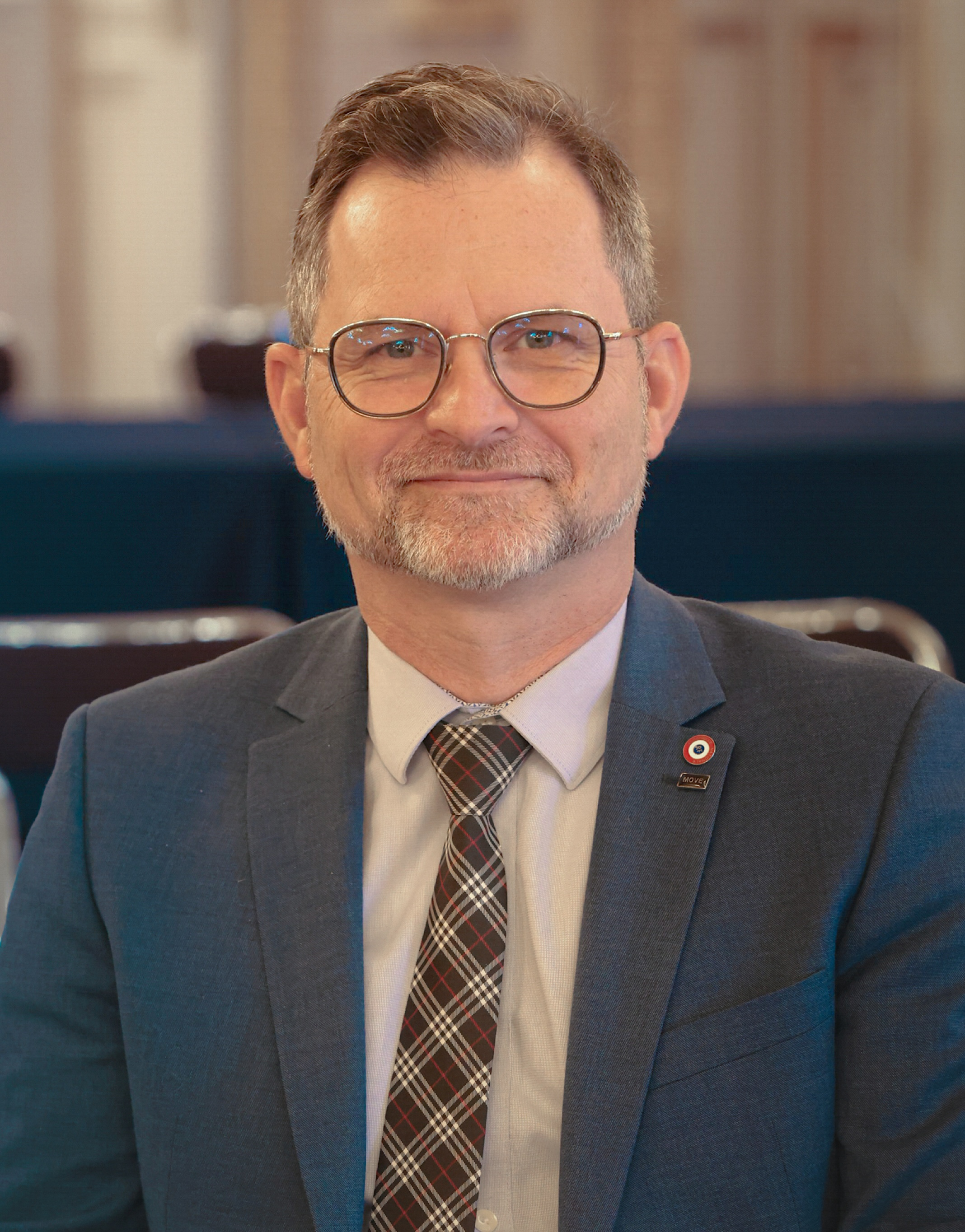

Member of the National Assembly for Ain's 4th constituency
- Incumbent
- Assumed office 22 June 2022
- Preceded by: Stéphane Trompille

Personal details
- Born: 15 January 1973 (age 53) Roanne, France
- Party: National Rally
- Education: University of Bologna; Jean Moulin University Lyon 3
- Profession: Teacher • Politician

Jérôme Buisson (born 15 January 1973) is a French politician and educator from the National Rally (RN) who has been the member of the National Assembly for the 4th constituency of Ain since 2022.

Buisson was born in 1973. He holds a degree from the University of Bologna in Italy followed by a teaching certificate at the Université Jean Moulin Lyon 3. From 2000 to 2015 he worked as a languages teacher at a school in Bourg-en-Bresse.

Buisson serves as a municipal councillor in Bourg-en-Bresse and as a community councillor for the Communauté d'agglomération du Bassin de Bourg-en-Bresse. He is the first National Rally member to serve as a Member of Parliament for an Ain constituency.

== See also ==
- List of deputies of the 16th National Assembly of France
