= Grégory Besson-Moreau =

French politician (born 1982)

Member of the National Assembly for Aube's 1st constituency
- In office 21 June 2017 – 21 June 2022
- Preceded by: Nicolas Dhuicq
- Succeeded by: Jordan Guitton

Personal details
- Born: 7 July 1982 (age 43) Brou-sur-Chantereine, France
- Party: La République En Marche!

Grégory Besson-Moreau (born 7 July 1982) is a French politician of La République En Marche! (LREM) who was a member of the French National Assembly from 2017 to 2022, representing the department of Aube.

== Political career ==
In parliament, Besson-Moreau served as member of the Committee on Economic Affairs. In 2018, he led the Assembly's special enquiry into a 2017 salmonella outbreak at a Lactalis milk factory that led to dozens of babies falling ill.

In addition to his committee assignments, Besson-Moreau was part of the French-Chinese Parliamentary Friendship Group and the French Parliamentary Friendship Group with the United Kingdom.

He lost his seat in the 2022 election to Jordan Guitton of National Rally.

== Political positions ==
In July 2019, Besson-Moreau voted in favor of the French ratification of the European Union’s Comprehensive Economic and Trade Agreement (CETA) with Canada.

== See also ==
- 2017 French legislative election
