= Jean-Frédéric Poisson =

French right-wing politician

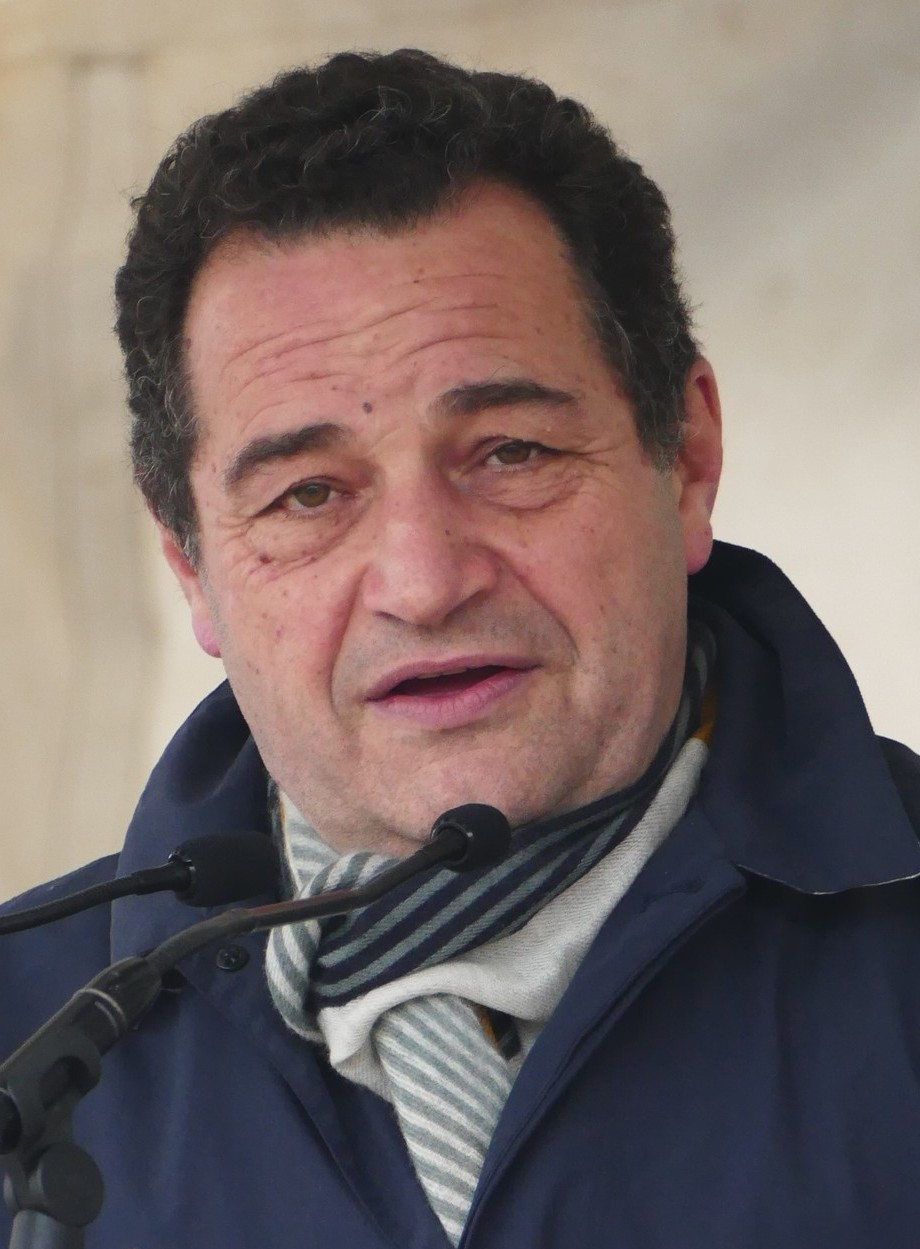

President of the VIA (previously Christian Democratic Party)
- In office 16 November 2013 – 10 February 2022
- Preceded by: Christine Boutin

Member of the National Assembly for Yvelines's 10th constituency
- In office 17 June 2012 – 20 June 2017
- Preceded by: Anny Poursinoff
- Succeeded by: Aurore Bergé

Member of the National Assembly for Yvelines's 10th constituency
- In office 20 September 2009 – 10 July 2010
- Preceded by: Christine Boutin
- Succeeded by: Anny Poursinoff
- In office 2007–2012
- Preceded by: Christine Boutin
- Succeeded by: Christine Boutin

Mayor of Rambouillet
- In office 2004–2007
- Preceded by: Gérard Larcher
- Succeeded by: Gérard Larcher

Personal details
- Born: 22 January 1963 (age 63) Belfort, France
- Party: Reconquête (2022–present)
- Other political affiliations: Christian Democratic Party (till 2022)
- Education: University of Paris, UVSQ

Jean-Frédéric Poisson (French pronunciation: [ʒɑ̃ fʁedeʁik pwasɔ̃]; born 22 January 1963) is a French right-wing politician and the president of VIA, the Way of the People (previously called the Christian Democratic Party). He was mayor of Rambouillet from 2004 to 2007, then became a National Assembly member from 2007 to 2017.

== Early life and education ==
Poisson was born 22 January 1963 in Belfort, the son of Burgundian parents. He and his four younger siblings spent their early years in Drôme. When the 1973 oil crisis hit, their father, a technician, lost his job and the family moved to the Villeneuve-la-Garenne area of Paris. His parents divorced not long after. Poisson lived in low-income housing for fifteen years and attended 8 schools, including reformatories, and was suspended from 7. He often left classes to do odd jobs around town to help support his family. By the time he turned 19, he was the president of the local House of Youth and Culture (MJC), which organized tutoring and summer camps for foster (DDASS) children.

On 30 January 1982 at 9:15am, he claims to have been "touched by divine grace" while sitting in philosophy class. Despite having been raised agnostic, this experience made him convert to Catholicism.

Poisson graduated from the Free Faculties of Philosophy and Psychology (IPC Paris) for a licence in philosophy in 1986, then went on to pursue a PhD in philosophy in ethics from Paris-Sorbonne University. He completed his dissertation, Bioethics, ethics, and humanism: the French laws of 1994, in 2001. He returned to school in 2011 to obtain a second licence, this time a degree in labor law from the University of Versailles Saint-Quentin-en-Yvelines, which he completed in 2011.

He initially began his post-graduate career in human resources in the metallurgical sector before briefly running a consulting company.

== Career ==
Poisson met Christine Boutin in 1993 at a talk she was giving about bioethics. He approached her afterwards and he eventually became her right-hand man. What was supposed to be a few-month-long partnership lasted for ten years. He credits her with his subsequent involvement in politics.

Only two years later, he joined the Rambouillet Municipal Council and later served at deputy mayor under Gérard Larcher. He served as mayor between 2004 and 2007 before joining the National Assembly to represent Yvelines's 10th constituency. He ran in the legislative election as a member of UPM, now known as The Republicans.

He contended for his seat again in 2009 but was beaten by Anny Poursinoff. Months later, however, he succeeded Christine Boutin after a by-election following her appointment to Minister of Housing and Urban Development by Nicolas Sarkozy. He won 53% of votes in the 2012 legislative elections and served until 2017. During his time in the Assembly, he served on the Cultural, Family, and Social Affairs Committee; was vice president of the Law Committee; and played on the Assembly's rugby team.

In 2017, he also lost the municipal majority for the first time since 1995. He was beaten by Rambouillet deputy mayor Gilles Schmidt, who Poisson claimed had promised he wouldn't run in the election. Poisson contacted Mayor Marc Roberts and demanded he sanction Schmidt for disloyalty.

In 2013, Christine Boutin resigned from her role as president of the Christian Democratic Party and Jean-Frédéric Poisson was appointed in her place. In 2015, Poisson announced he would be running in the Republican primaries ahead of the 2017 French presidential election, which he qualified for as president of the Christian Democratic Party without having to gain voter support first. He came sixth in the first round with 1.5% of the vote and was eliminated.

In 2020, he announced he would be running in the for president in 2022 but withdrew his campaign in December 2021. He left the Rambouillet Municipal Council the same year after 25 years of service. As of 2021, Poisson has written three books: Bioéthique : l'homme contre l'homme? (Bioethics: Man against man?) (2007); L'Islam à la conquête de l'Occident: La stratégie dévoilée (Islam conquers the West: The strategy unveiled) (2018); and La voix du peuple (The peoples’ voice) (2020).

== Political beliefs ==
=== Nationalism, immigration, and international relations ===
Poisson is a strong French nationalist and Eurosceptic, and believes that France should be monocultural. He believes in a fractured government where there are intermediary governmental bodies rather than an omnipotent state. He and Nicolas Dupont-Aignan, leader of the nationalistic political party Debout la France, launched Lovers of France (Amoureux de la France) in 2017 to rally “French patriots” to develop a governmental program in-line with nationalist values. Shortly after, Yann Barthès made a comment on his news show ‘’Quotidien’’ encouraging his audience to register for the Lovers of France with false information. Poisson and Dupont-Aignan accused him of sabotage and filed a complaint with the Superior Audiovisual Council. He calls for the reinstatement of blood law, which grants French citizenship only to children born in France to French parents. He also believes French citizens should be able to decide what kind and how much social assistance foreign nationals receive, and that immigrants should not have access to state medical care. He opposes family reunification and wants to overall reduce the number of immigrants coming into France. Since 2015, he has been working with Syrian president Bashar al-Assad against ISIS. He does not support the regime itself but trusts that a partnership will better protect and strengthen both countries, and that Syria is “the key to the Middle East.” He has expressed interest in a treaty with Vladimir Putin and Russia to fight terrorism as well. He voted “no” to the Maastricht Treaty and still believes the EU should be dissolved and that French borders should be closed; he also wants to renegotiate the terms of the Schengen Agreement. In the event that the EU stays intact, however, he would prefer to see the biggest political responsibilities handled by the richest European countries.

=== Education ===
Poisson is strongly in favour of the reformation of how history is taught in French schools and believes that French language instruction should be better prioritized, including compulsory language proficiency in primary school. He supports reformatory schools and requiring school uniforms. He also wants more autonomy for schools, more independent schools outside of the French education system and for teachers to "enter into private law contracts."

=== Family, gender, and sexuality ===
Family is one of Poisson’s core values. He thinks it should be a central part of everyone’s life and that the Minister of Families, Children and Social Development should be treated as more important than environmental ministries because “parents and children are more important than butterflies or blades of grass.” The importance of this topic manifests as strong opposition to same-sex marriage, adoption by same-sex couples, access to medically assisted reproduction (such as IVF), and surrogacy options for any couple. He even calls for a global ban on surrogates, claiming that women would become commodified and that surrogacy is already “a form of modern slavery.” He has stated that same-sex couples want to adopt just in the name of equality; he does not believe that a child without both a mother and father has a complete family. He also strictly opposes the right to abortion. However, he does not think that pro-abortion websites should be censored or banned by the government. He is particularly critical of same-sex marriage and was the only candidate in the 2016 Republican primaries to oppose it. He is active in anti same-sex marriage movements such as the Manif Pour Tous and has attended demonstrations calling for the repeal of Christiane Taubira’s 2013 Law 2013-404, which enabled same-sex couples to marry and to adopt. Though he appears to support the equality of men and women, he has been accused of sexism after telling Le Figaro that he considers female colleagues “part of the feast” when legislation is held in a hemicycle.

=== Labour and economy ===
Despite being a major proponent of universal basic income, Poisson also wants to reform taxation in a way that would give companies more tax breaks. He would like hiring practices and the labour code to be reformed into something more flexible, both for the company and for new university graduates “between their studies and their profession.” Other tax reformation ideas include micro-taxing and a flat tax. He believes the country is in a wage crisis and calls for the restoration of family allowance. He also wants France to withdraw from NATO.

=== Religion ===
Poisson is strongly against Islam in France. He is in favour of suppressing the French Council of the Muslim Faith, but is unbothered by the current laws regarding wearing religious symbols. He wants France to dictate to Muslims what the country expects "in exchange for the guarantee of their rights, their dignity and the decency of the conditions of practice of their faith." Poisson is in favour of withdrawing French memory law, which criminalizes denial or minimization of the Holocaust. In 2016, he was criticized for anti-Semitic comments made about the danger of bending to Hillary Clinton's "Zionist lobbyists." Dismissal from the Republican primaries was briefly discussed and he apologized, saying he did not mean any offense and that he wanted to "reiterate here all the friendships I have for the state of Israel and for the Jewish people as a whole."

As a Catholic, Poisson is deeply interested in returning to the "Christian roots" of France through the Constitution. He is also against working on Sundays.

=== Support of other candidates ===
In 2016/2017, Poisson supported François Fillon in the French elections and Donald Trump in the American elections. He endorsed Trump again in 2020 and referred to him as someone who “invites us to take destiny in hand.” He has voiced sympathies for the National Rally; would have voted for conservative Béziers mayor Robert Ménard had he been in the voting constituency; and said that, if Éric Zemmour made support of the “weakest” a more central part of his platform, then he would withdraw from the presidential race to make way for Zemmour’s victory. In 2022, Poisson stated he was supporting Éric Zemmour and would be joining Reconquête.

=== COVID-19 pandemic ===
Poisson is very critical of France’s actions during the 2020 COVID-19 quarantine periods. He claimed they would not work, and incorrectly argued that more than 850 people have died due to the COVID vaccine. He battled mask-wearing mandates in legislative bodies in July 2020 and again in September; and against curfew for high-risk occupations in October. He has led protests against the “restricti[on] of freedoms" along with Patriots leader Florian Philippot. He accused the government of “kill[ing] the country” and argued that people were developing more psychiatric disorders, experiencing more mental distress, and struggling with inaccessible autonomy during the pandemic.

=== Other stances ===
Poisson regularly campaigns for a more humane prison system and for the introduction of a seven-year, non-renewable term in the National Assembly. He is also in favour of reestablishing mandatory national service, which, in lieu of military service, might be “environmental, associative,” or educational. Similarly, he thinks France should give at least 2,5% of its GDP to the defense budget and that they should increase the army size to more than 300,000 men. In terms of medicine, Poisson is opposed to healthcare that rewards those who have a healthy lifestyle and/or penalize those who don't. He calls this idea Orwellian and thinks it would eventually evolve into the government having full control over life choices.

== Personal life ==
Poisson and his wife, a psychologist, have no children. He started learning Arabic in 2014 so he could read the Quran to better understand the intent behind it. He hunts during his spare time.
