= Michèle Vianès =

French feminist activist

- Born: 1946 (age 79–80); Tunisie
- Citizenship: French
- Organization: Regards de Femmes
- Known for: Gender equality activism
- Office: Member of the High Council for Equality between Women and Men (France), 2025–present
- Movement: Women's rights
- Honours: Officer of the Legion of Honour (2024)

Michèle Vianès is a French activist for gender equality, women's rights and for secularism. She is the co-founder and president of the Regards de Femmes non-governmental organization.

== Biography ==
She was born in Tunisia in 1946, before moving to France where she studied, and then becomes a teacher between 1970 and 2001 in Lyon.

She was also a municipal councilor of Caluire-et-Cuire from 2001 to 2014 and deputy from 2007 to 2009.

== Career ==
In 1998, she co-founded with 2 other people the non-profit organisation Regards de Femmes, an NGO that holds consultative status with the United Nations and as an INGO by the Organisation Internationale de la Francophonie (OIF).

She advocates for universal human rights for women and girls and participating in international events such as the Commision of Status of Women (CSW) at the UN in New York.

Additionally, she organizes events, and conducts training to become electoral candidates in France and in various African countries.

She became a member of the High Council for Equality between Women and Men on the 23 June 2025

== Distinctions ==
Distinction
Ribbon bar	Honour	Official Promotion	Official Decernation
	Knight of the Legion of Honour, France	1 January 2009	9 October 2009 - Fadela Amara, French secretary of State
	Officer of the Legion of Honour, France	14 July 2024	23 February 2025 - Aurore Bergé, French minister

== Bibliography ==
- Vianès, Michèle (January 2004). Un voile sur la république [A veil over the republic] (in French). Stock. ISBN 9782234056695.
- Les dix mots qui font la France. 2006.
