= Nicolas Dhuicq =

French politician

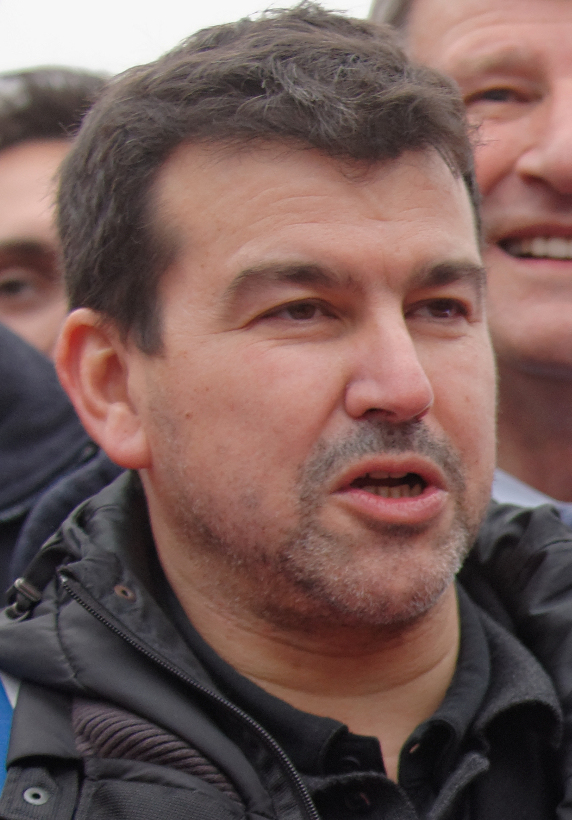
Dhuicq

Nicolas Dhuicq (French pronunciation: [nikɔla dɥik]; born 29 November 1960 in Paris) is a French politician. He is the mayor of Brienne-le-Château and a former member of the National Assembly of France from 2007 to 2017. He represented Aube's 1st constituency as a member of "Les Républicains", formerly known as the Union for a Popular Movement.

In 2022, Dhuicq announced that he was supporting Éric Zemmour and had joined Reconquête. However, he changed his mind a few weeks later and announced that he would vote for Marine Le Pen, ultimately judging that Éric Zemmour was only a “caricaturist”.
