= Auffargis =

- Commune
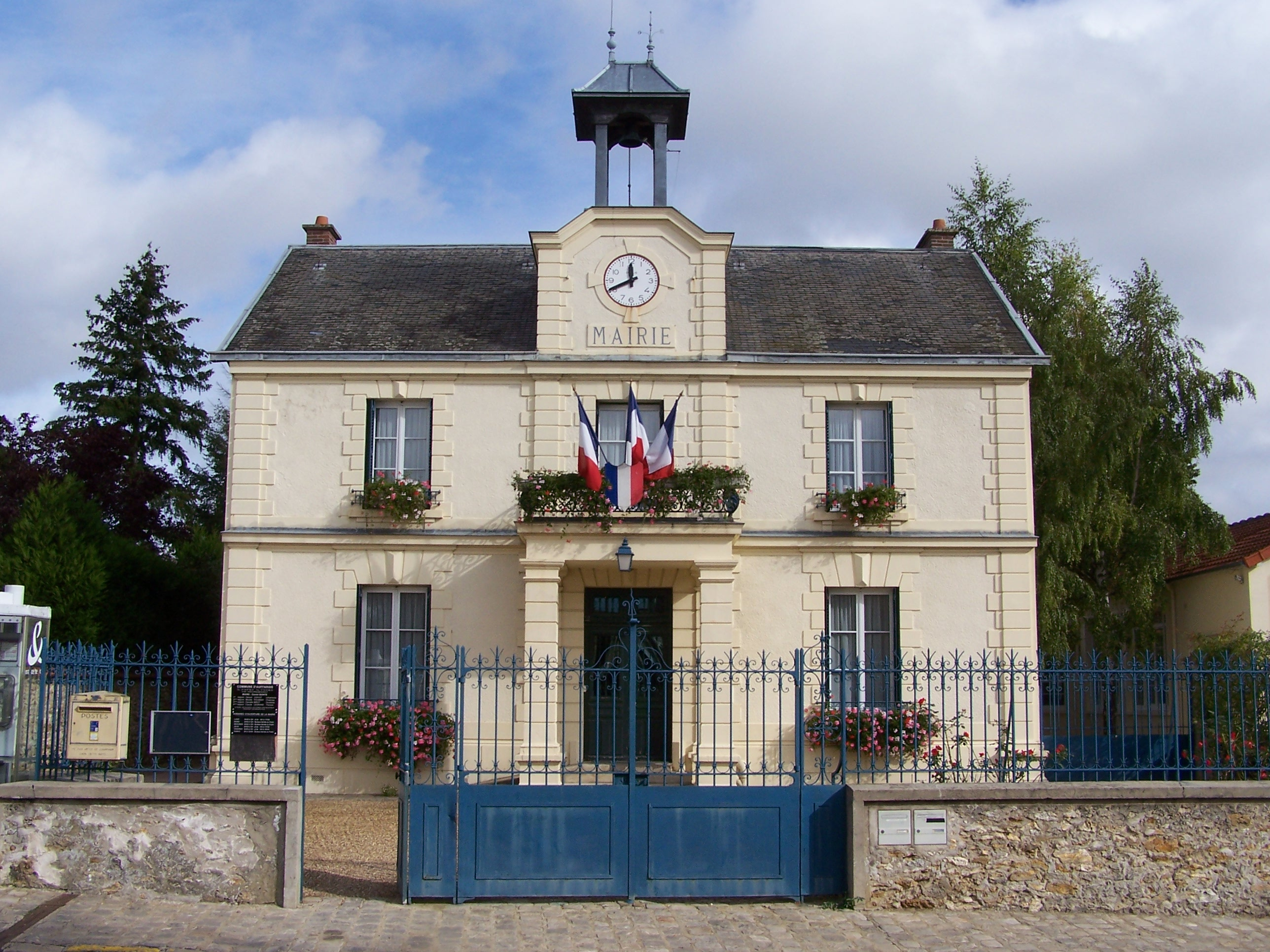
- Town hall
- Location of Auffargis
- Location within France Location within Île-de-France (region)
- Coordinates: 48°42′00″N 1°53′17″E
- Country: France
- Region: Île-de-France
- Department: Yvelines
- Arrondissement: Rambouillet
- Canton: Rambouillet
- Intercommunality: CA Rambouillet Territoires

Government
  - Mayor (2020–2026): Daniel Bonte
- Area^{1}: 17.14 km^{2} (6.62 sq mi)
- Elevation: 150 m (490 ft)
- Highest elevation: 177 m (581 ft)
- Lowest elevation: 120 m (390 ft)
- Population (2023): 1,963
  - Density: 114.5/km^{2} (296.6/sq mi)
- Time zone: UTC+01:00 (CET)
  - Summer (DST): UTC+02:00 (CEST)
- INSEE/Postal code: 78030 /78610
- ^{1} French Land Register data, which excludes lakes, ponds, glaciers > 1 km^{2} (0.386 sq mi or 247 acres) and river estuaries.

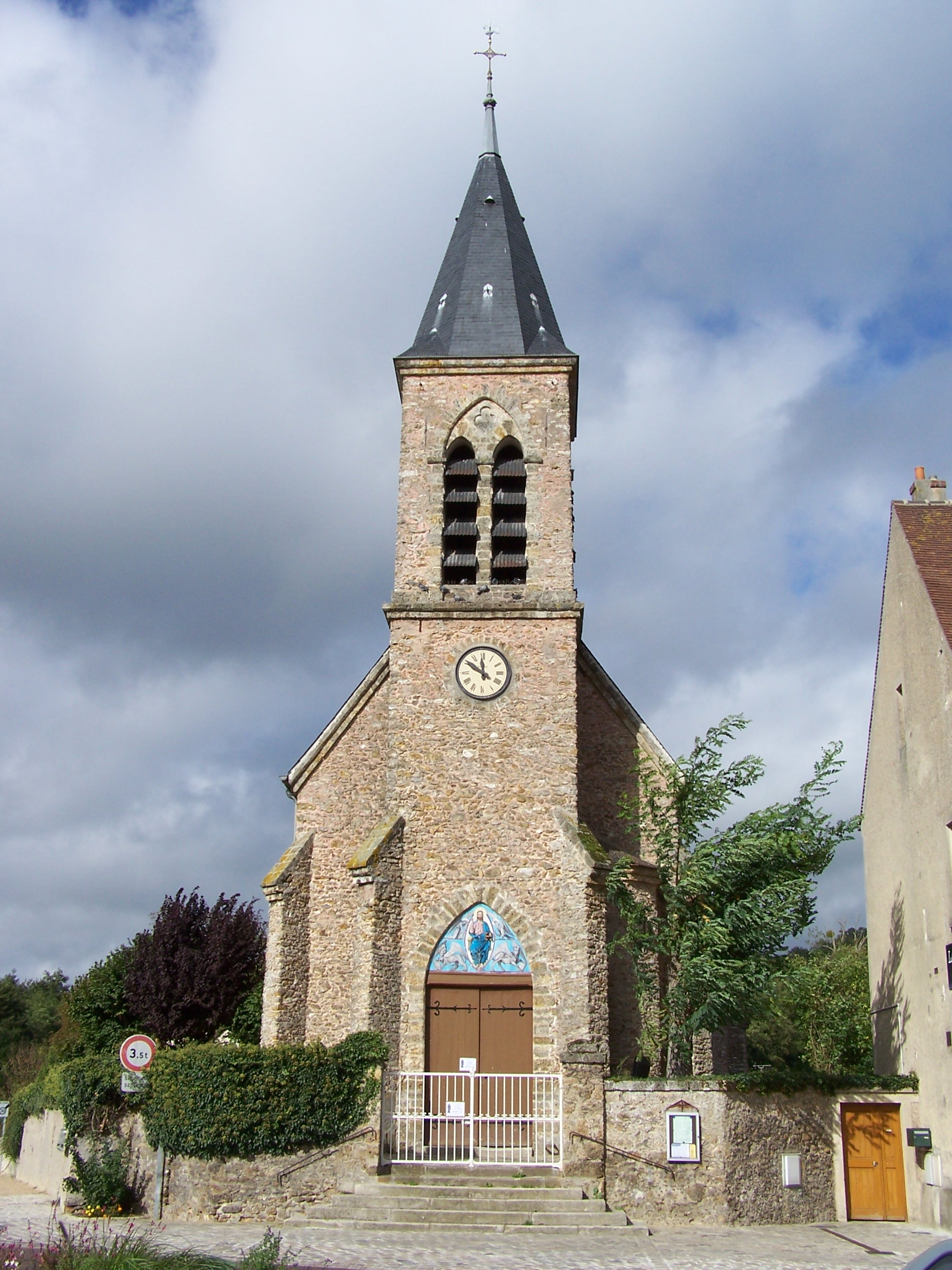
Saint-André

Auffargis (French: [ofaʁʒis]) is a commune in the Yvelines department in north-central France.

== Population ==
Historical population
Year	Pop.	±% p.a.
1968	750	—
1975	1,544	+10.87%
1982	1,729	+1.63%
1990	1,925	+1.35%
1999	1,859	−0.39%
2007	1,951	+0.61%
2012	1,979	+0.29%
2017	1,982	+0.03%
2023	1,963	−0.16%
Source: INSEE

== See also ==
- Communes of the Yvelines department
