= VIA, the Way of the People =

Political party in France

VIA | Christian Democratic Party VIA | Parti Chrétien démocrate
- Founded: 27 February 2001
- Split from: Union for French Democracy
- Headquarters: Paris
- Ideology: Christian democracy Social conservatism Christian right Soft Euroscepticism
- Political position: Far-right
- National affiliation: Reconquête (2022–)
- European affiliation: European Christian Political Party
- National Assembly: 0 / 577 (0%)
- Senate: 0 / 348 (0%)
- European Parliament: 0 / 81 (0%)

Website
- via-partichretiendemocrate.fr

Logo used as the Christian-Democratic Party

VIA, the Way of the People (French: VIA | la voie du peuple, VIA) is a social conservative and Christian rightist party in France. The party was known as the Forum of Social Republicans (FRS) between 2001 and June 2009 before adopting the name Christian Democratic Party (French: Parti chrétien-démocrate, PCD), which it used until 3 October 2020. The party was founded by Christine Boutin. On 3 October 2020, the party would change its name to the current one.

The FRS was established in March 2001 as a social conservative faction within the liberal conservative Union for French Democracy (UDF) and emerged as an independent party in December of the same year, when Boutin announced her candidacy in the 2002 French presidential election, in contrast with UDF leader and official candidate François Bayrou, and was consequently expelled.

In 2005, the FRS called for a NO vote in the referendum over the Treaty establishing a Constitution for Europe.

VIA is a Christian-oriented social conservative party, opposed to gay marriage, abortion and euthanasia.

VIA was an associate party of the Union for a Popular Movement and was a member of the Liaison Committee for the Presidential Majority.

Since November 2013, Jean-Frédéric Poisson has been the president of the party.

== Elected officials ==
- Deputies: Dino Cinieri (UMP group)

The party claims 9,500 members as of 2009.

== Election results ==
=== European Parliament ===
Election	Leader	Votes	%	Seats	+/−	EP Group
2024 (Note: Run in a joint list with LP, that won no seats.)	Jean-Frédéric Poisson	228,351	0.93 (#13)	0 / 81	New	−
