= Reconquête =

French right wing political party

Reconquest Reconquête
- Abbreviation: R! REC
- Leader: Éric Zemmour
- Founder: Éric Zemmour
- Founded: 5 December 2021; 4 years ago
- Headquarters: 10 Rue Jean-Goujon, 75008 Paris, France
- Youth wing: Génération Zemmour
- Membership (March 2025): 75,000 (claimed)
- Ideology: Ultraconservatism; National conservatism; Right-wing populism; Euroscepticism; Protectionism
- Political position: Far-right
- European affiliation: Europe of Sovereign Nations (since 2024)
- European Parliament group: Europe of Sovereign Nations Group (since 2024) (Note: The party was formerly part of the ECR Group (2022–2024).)
- Colours: Blue; Red
- National Assembly: 0 / 577
- Senate: 0 / 348
- European Parliament (French seats): 1 / 81
- Regional councillors: 13 / 1,758
- Departmental councillors: 6 / 4,058

Party flag

Website
- parti-reconquete.fr

Reconquête (French: [ʁəkɔ̃kɛt], REC; English: Reconquest), stylised as Reconquête! (often shortened as R!), is a far-right political party in France founded in late 2021 by Éric Zemmour, who has since served as its leader. He was a candidate in the 2022 presidential election, in which he placed fourth with just over 7% of the vote as the best newcomer.

== History ==
=== Background ===
From September 2021, opinion polling for the 2022 presidential election showed a sharp rise in favour of far-right journalist and author Éric Zemmour in the months before he formally became a candidate. A series of opinion polls suggested that Zemmour might reach the presidential election's second round, competing against incumbent President Emmanuel Macron. Although there had been speculation about a possible run for the presidential nomination of The Republicans in the party's 2021 congress, Zemmour opted to put his name forward as the nominee of a new party.

=== Launch ===
Éric Zemmour formally announced his candidacy for the presidency on 30 November 2021 through a video posted on YouTube. It was seen by over 2.6 million viewers in three days.

Reconquête was launched on 5 December 2021; at the founding rally held in Villepinte, Zemmour proposed a "reconquest of the greatest country in the world" in front of 15,000 people. The party's name is direct reference to the Iberian Reconquista. Zemmour and Reconquête's campaign directors for the upcoming elections were announced as Court of Audit magistrate Sarah Knafo and former French Army major general Bertrand de La Chesnais. Reconquête's youth wing, Génération Z, which had been established to mobilise the youth around a possible presidential candidacy of Zemmour, entered the party structure ex post.

In December 2021, Joachim Son-Forget, elected to the National Assembly in 2017 for French residents overseas as a La République En Marche! candidate, was the first MP to support Zemmour. Former presidential candidate Philippe de Villiers also announced his support for Zemmour and the party. Zemmour made claims to the media of 40,000 members within days, 60,000 a few days later. In February 2022, Reconquête officially welcomed its 100,000th member.

In January 2022, the party gained its second member of the National Assembly as Guillaume Peltier, previously elected as a member of The Republicans, as well as two Members of the European Parliament (MEPs) when Jérôme Rivière and Gilbert Collard from the National Rally defected to the party. Rivière had presided over the French delegation to the Identity and Democracy group in the European Parliament until he joined Reconquête. In early February 2022, the party gained a third MEP when Maxette Grisoni-Pirbakas defected from the National Rally, while MEP Nicolas Bay joined in mid-February. Stéphane Ravier became the party's first Senator after he left the National Rally in mid-February 2022, whilst Sébastien Meurant became the second Senator in March 2022. In May 2022 Myriane Houplain became the partys second MP.

Other notable people who have been involved around Zemmour's candidacy include former MPs Marion Maréchal, Christine Boutin, Nicolas Dhuicq, Jean-Frédéric Poisson and Jacques Bompard, as well as former MEPs Jean-Yves Le Gallou, Paul-Marie Coûteaux and Bruno Mégret.

=== Online controversy ===
In February 2022, a reporter embedded into the Zemmour campaign's online division discovered and reported on a covert online campaign targeting Facebook and Wikipedia. A "shadow army" was delegated to join a huge number of Facebook groups and post pro-Zemmour content to raise the candidate's profile as much as possible. Another group of the shadow online team is a task force called "WikiZedia" which is tasked with editing pages on Wikipedia, in particular the French article about Zemmour, which is the top viewed article on French Wikipedia. "WikiZedia" members are charged with promoting Zemmour's page and linking to it as much as possible at the online encyclopedia. A veteran editor of French Wikipedia who was one of its top contributors was identified as being part of the Zemmour shadow team, described as being "in charge of the Zemmour page on Wikipedia" and was blocked from editing by Wikipedia administrators, along with six other editors. As soon as they learned of the affair, Wikimedia France immediately alerted the French media online watchdog agency ARCOM, which tracks online piracy and manipulation of digital communications.

=== 2024 elections ===
The party won five seats in the 2024 European Parliament election in France.

On 12 June 2024, Marion Maréchal was expelled from the party due to calling on voters to support RN candidates in the 2024 snap legislative election. Three other party MEPs were expelled for supporting her, leaving the party with one MEP, Sarah Knafo.

Reconquête lost most of its votes and did not win any seats in the first round of the 2024 French legislative election, on 30 June 2024.

== Ideology ==
Reconquête vows to bolster the French economy in line with what some observers have called a Colbertist approach. Reconquête promotes the Great Replacement conspiracy theory and the far-right remigration policy for the forced mass deportation of non-white immigrants from France. Its main campaign themes are identity, education, taxes, industry and independence. It advocates for a reduction in immigration numbers, de-Islamisation, security through new deportation legislation, an improvement in public instruction levels with a revision of the collège system, lower taxes for the least prosperous French people, as well as higher economic competitivity. Speaking at the founding rally, Zemmour promised to "slash immigration to almost zero", to deport people who unsuccessfully sought asylum and illegal immigrants, as well as to remove France from NATO's integrated command.

In terms of economic policy, Reconquête seeks to implement a "country-score" (French: Patrie-score) which would clearly indicate to the consumer whether a product is French or not.

In foreign policy, the party seeks to strengthen French fiscal and political autonomy against the European Union (EU). Zemmour has expressed support for Brexit and the UK's vote to leave the EU, but argued that France's situation was different and that he would not seek to withdraw France from the EU. Instead, he has summed up his position as "I want France to be in Europe, but I want France to come first before Europe" and pledged to veto any further EU expansion plans. He has also stated the platform will include withdrawing France from EU immigration and asylum policies, ensuring the French tricolour is always displayed above the EU flag, putting French law above EU law and halting accession talks with Eastern European nations looking to join. Reconquête is also opposed to the accession of Turkey to the European Union. The party takes a pro-Israel stance, with Zemmour describing the Gaza war as the "fight of our civilisation", calling for a ban on Hamas's 'parent organisation', the Muslim Brotherhood, in France, and visiting Israel in solidarity. Reconquête seeks to ban the Muslim Brotherhood and linked organisations. The party also wants to place a ban on structures that seek to promote Jihad. It would like to put into practice a tighter control of imams and Islamic preachers in mosques and other Islamic sites in France, including tighter control of external funding for these places of worship and preachers.

The party supports banning the Islamic veil (hijab) in all public places.

== Composition and demographics ==
In contrast to most far-right political parties in Europe, Reconquête's support does not predominantly come from blue-collar or working class voters. The party's electorate is often considered more similar to The Republicans rather than that of the National Rally.

In urban areas, the party scores well in ideologically Right-leaning Bourgeoisie strongholds, such as the western arrondissements of Paris, as shown in the 2024 European Parliament elections and 2026 Paris municipal election.

It is also predominantly male and older, citing Eric Zemmour's often controversial views on women.

== Election results ==
=== Presidential ===
Presidency of the French Republic
| Election year | Candidate | First round | | | Second round | | |
| Election year | Candidate | Votes | % | Rank | Votes | % | Rank |
|---|---|---|---|---|---|---|---|
| 2022 | Éric Zemmour | 2,485,226 | 7.07 | 4th | —N/a | | |

=== National Assembly ===
National Assembly
| Election year | Leader | First round | | Second round | | Seats | +/− |
| Election year | Leader | Votes | % | Votes | % | Seats | +/− |
|---|---|---|---|---|---|---|---|
| 2022 | Éric Zemmour | 964,868 | 4.24% | —N/a | | 0 / 577 | 0 |
| 2024 | Éric Zemmour | 238,934 | 0.75% | —N/a | | 0 / 577 | 0 |

=== European Parliament ===
European Parliament
| Election | Leader | Votes | % | Seats | +/− | EP Group |
|---|---|---|---|---|---|---|
| 2024 (Note: Run in a joint list with MC, that won 5 seats in total.) | Marion Maréchal | 1,345,234 | 5.46 (#7) | 4 / 81 | New | ESN |

== Organization ==
=== Leadership ===
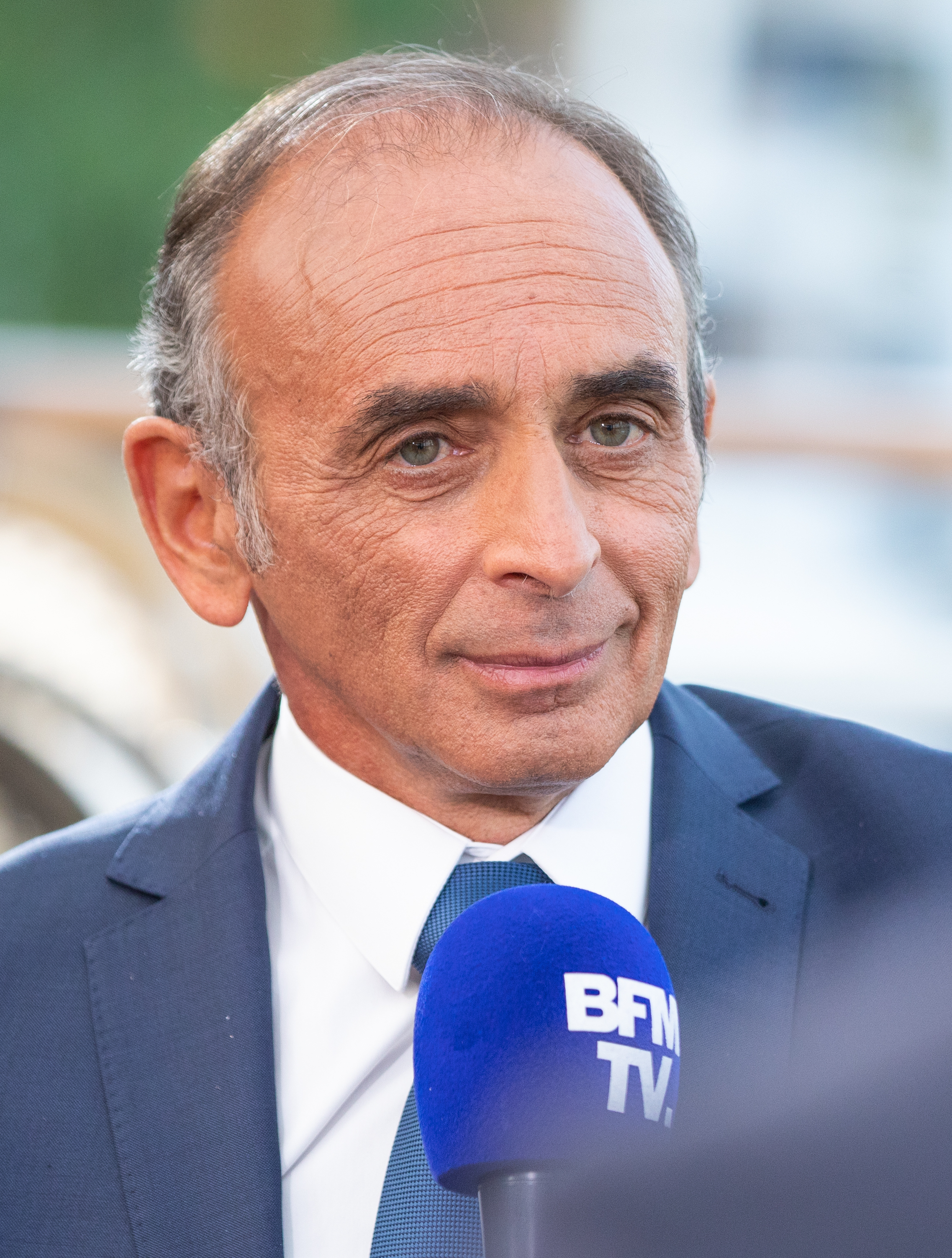
Éric Zemmour

Reconquête is led by Éric Zemmour from Paris, the party's founder and candidate in the 2022 presidential election. In 2022 he was assisted by the three vice-presidents Guillaume Peltier, Marion Maréchal, and Nicolas Bay.

=== Notable members ===
- Bertrand de La Chesnais
- Jean Messiha
- Philippe de Villiers
- Sarah Knafo

==== Notable former members ====
- Gilbert Collard
- Guillaume Peltier
- Jérôme Rivière
- Laurence Trochu
- Marion Maréchal
- Maxette Grisoni-Pirbakas
- Nicolas Bay
- Nicolas Dhuicq
- Stéphane Ravier
- Stanislas Rigault
