= Aristide Croisy =

French sculptor

Aristide Onésime Croisy
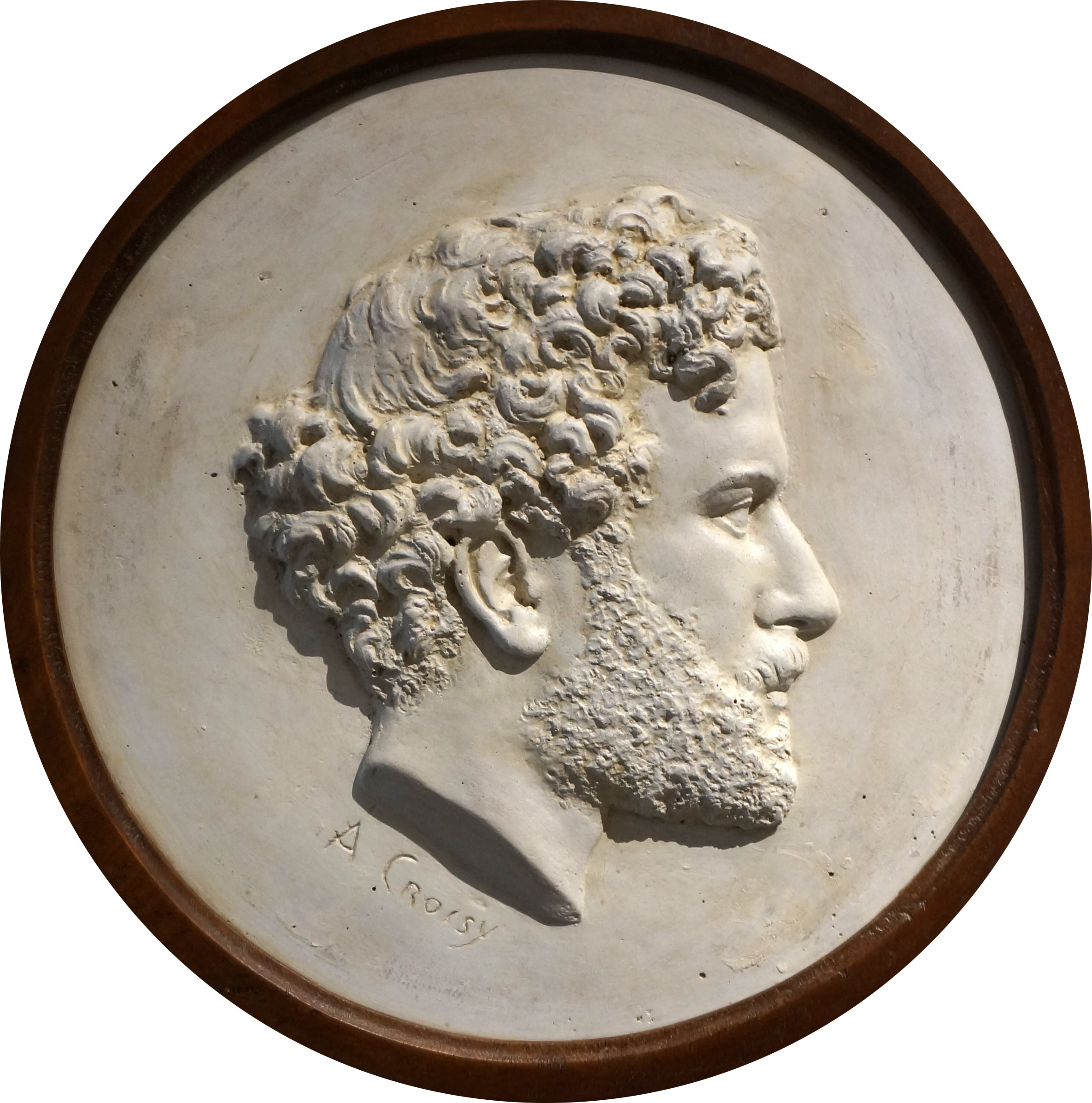
- Self-portrait
- Born: 31 March 1840; Fagnon, Ardennes, France
- Died: 7 November 1899 (aged 59); Fagnon, Ardennes, France
- Occupation: Sculptor

Onésime-Aristide Croisy (31 March 1840 – 7 November 1899) was a French sculptor. He is known for his dramatic bronze military statues, but perhaps best known for his marble Le Nid (The Nest), showing two children asleep in an armchair.

== Early life and education ==
Onésime-Aristide Croisy was born in Fagnon, a village in the Ardennes, on 31 March 1840. His father was Adolphe Croisy, a master mason who was later responsible for building the fortifications at Mézières, Ardennes. His mother was Marie-Charlotte Villière. He made his first models while living at Mézieres. He entered the École des Beaux-Arts on 8 October 1857. His teachers were Armand Toussaint and Charles Gumery. He also studied under Augustin-Alexandre Dumont. He won the second 2nd-class grand prize of the Prix de Rome in 1863. The subject was Nisus et Euryale. He competed again in 1865 and won the first 2nd-class grand prize. In 1865 the École des Beaux-Arts awarded him the grand medal for sculpture. His real debut was at the Salon of 1867.

== Career ==
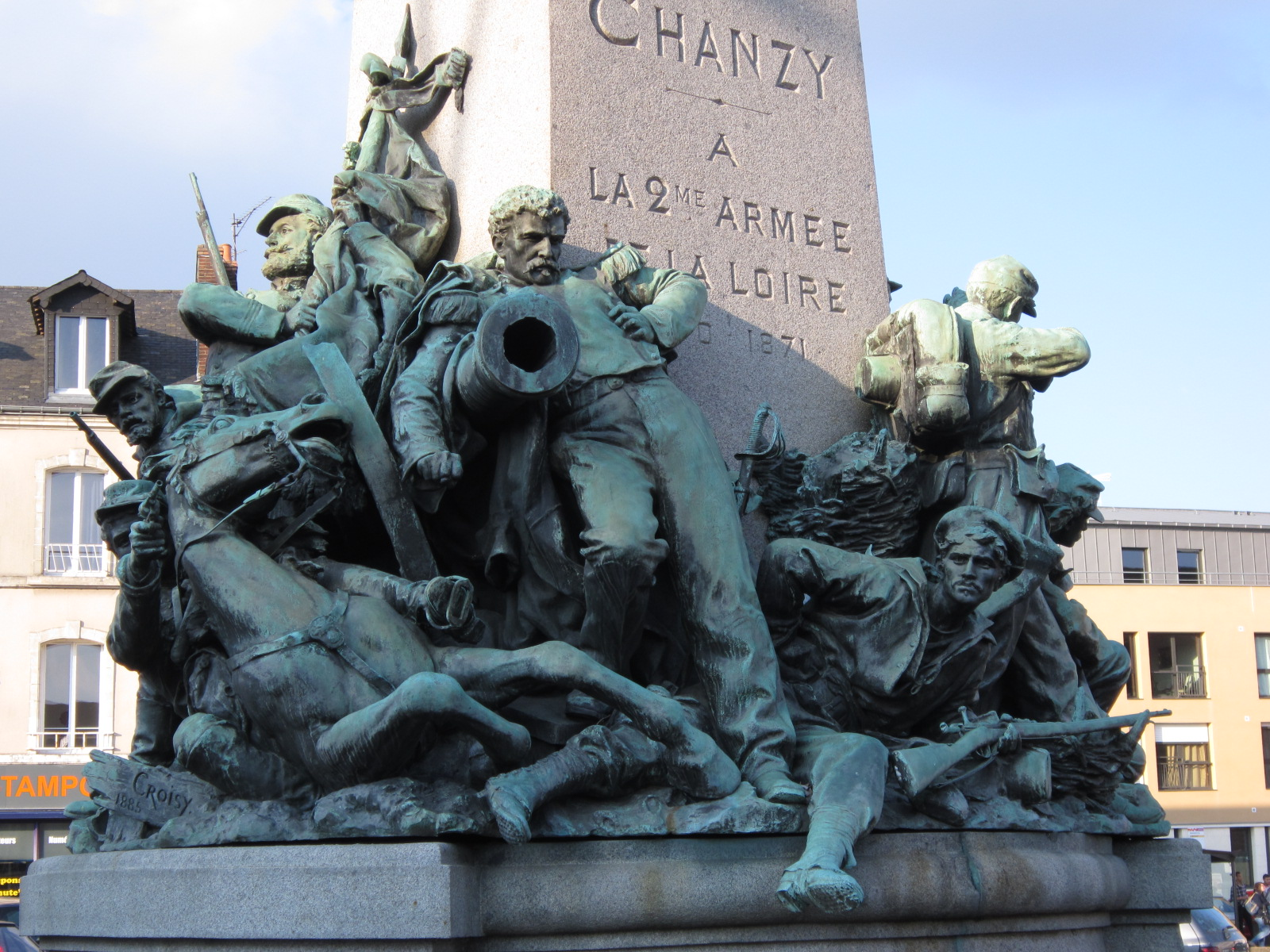
Monument à l'armée de la Loire, Le Mans (1885)

After the Franco-Prussian War of 1870 Croisy received several orders to glorify the French war heroes. On 20 October 1875 he married Louise Pouillard in Charleville, Ardennes. He excelled in expressive and vigorous bronze sculptures of military subjects. These included the sculpture Monument à l'armée de la Loire et au général Chanzy in Orléans, the bas-reliefs of the Statue de Chanzy in Le Mans (1885) and the statue of Mobile in Sainte-Anne-d'Auray. He also sculpted General Boulanger and the statue of Étienne Méhul, author of the Chant du départ..., for his home town of Givet. He made the groups surrounding the pedestal of the monument of General Chanzy erected at Le Mans in 1885, representing four episodes of national defense.

In 1875 Croisy made a plaster statue of Paolo and Francesca showing two innocent young lovers in Florentine dress reading a book together. This was a common theme at the time, from which Auguste Rodin would make a dramatic departure with his famous The Kiss of 1881. In 1877 Croisy worked on restoration of the chapel of the Palace of Versailles. He made various allegorical statues for monuments in Paris such as Architecture for the Paris Bourse.

Croisy sculpted Le Nid (The Nest) in 1882, considered to be his masterpiece. It received 2nd medal at the Salon that year. The work was acquired for the Musée du Luxembourg, then in 1901 deposited at Montbrison, Loire. It was placed in a pavilion in the Allard garden beside the bus route, then spent some time in the hall of the Beauregard hospital, and then was placed in the Allard Museum in Montbrison. Made of polished white marble it represents two children, a brother and sister, asleep in a comfortable armchair.

Croisy was awarded the Legion of Honor in 1885. The entrance portico of the Bourse de commerce (Paris), built in 1888–89 is surmounted by a pediment supported by four fluted Corinthian columns on which three allegorical figures by Croisy represent the City of Paris flanked by Trade and Abundance. Aristide Croisy died on 7 November 1899 at Fagnon, his native town. Apart from Le Nid his best works include La Priere d'Abel; Psyche; Paola Malatesta et Francoise de Rimini; Le Moissonneur; L'Architecture (for the interior of the Louvre); Mercure for the Jardin du Palais Royal; Méhul, for Givet; Le General Chanzy, for Nouart, repeated for Beaugency; A la Memoire des Soldats morts pour la Patrie (Salon, 1895); L'Armie de la Loire, for which he won a First Medal for Sculpture in the Salon of 1895.

== Salons ==
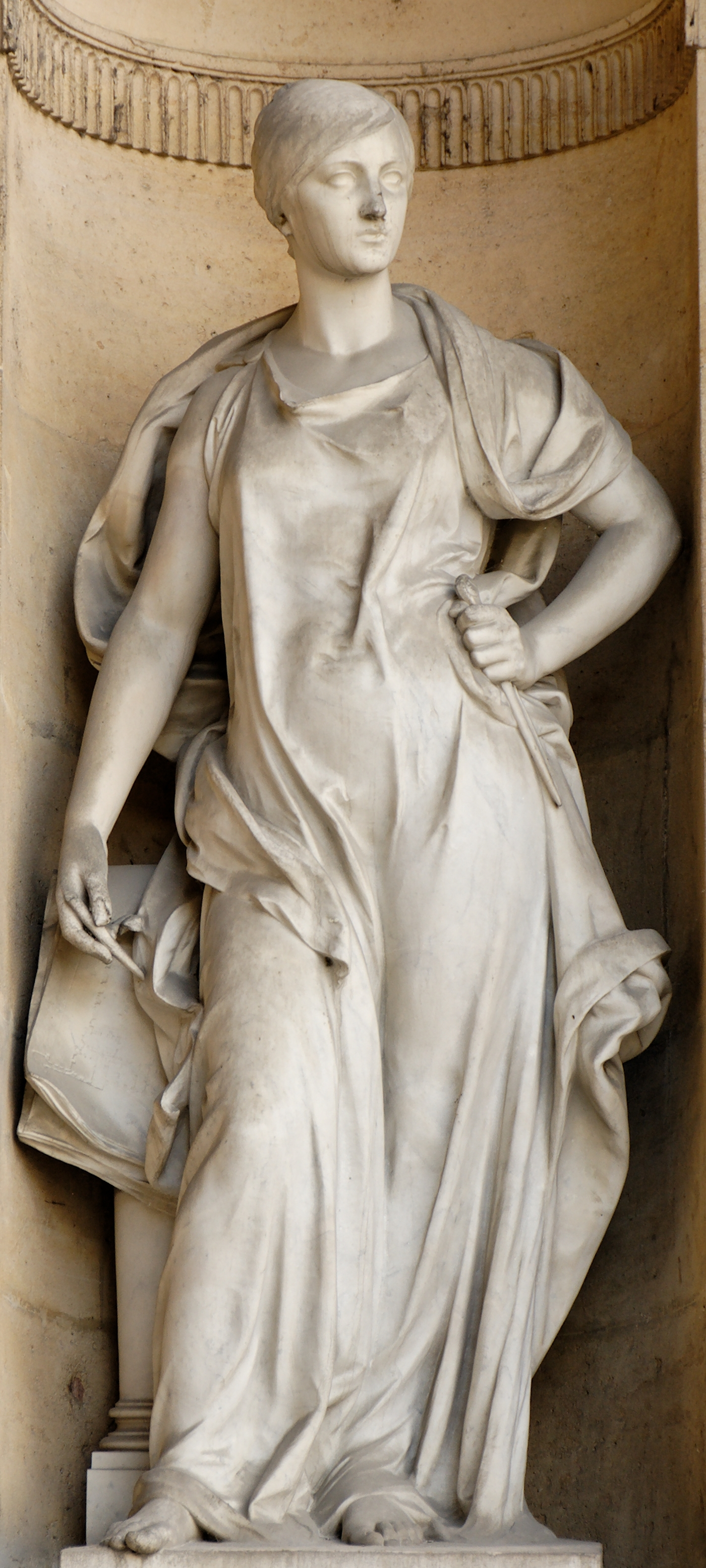
Architecture, cour Carree, Louvre

Works exhibited at the Salons up to 1888 included:

- 1867: La Fondation de la ville de Marseille, marble bas relief, musée des beaux-arts de Marseille

— La Prière d'Abel, bronze statue, Paris, Palais de la Légion d'Honneur

- 1868: La Prière d'Abel, plaster statue

— Portrait de M. le vicomte de L., marble bust

- 1869: Néréide, plaster statue

— Portrait d'Émile Augier , plaster bust

- 1870: Psyché évenouie, plaster statue
- 1873: Aux Ardennais morts pour la Patrie, group now in Charleville, 3rd class medal
- 1875: Portrait de M. Lacaille, avocat, bronze bust
- 1876: Françoise de Rimini, plaster group, Charleville museum
- 1876 Edmond Toupet des Vignes, bronze bust
- 1877: Portrait de M. Gailly, député, marble bust

— Portrait de M. H. Perrin, plaster bust

- 1878: Le Repos ou le moissonneur, plaster statue

— Paul Malatesta et Françoise de Rimini, marble group, shown at the Exposition universelle on the Champ de Mars
— Le Général Chanzy Bust

- 1879: La Fille aux raisins, plaster statue

— Portrait de M.H., marble bust

- 1880 : Le Nid, plaster group, now in Charleville Museum

— Portrait de Léonce Détroyat, plaster bust

- 1882: Le Nid, marble group, reproduction of the 1880 work. 2nd class medal, Now in Luxembourg Museum

— Portrait de M^{me} P.J., Marble bust

- 1883: Portrait de M^{me} K..., Marble bust

— Chanzy sur son lit de mort, Plaster bust
— Bradfer, maire de Bar-le-Duc et conseiller d'arrondissement, Plaster model for the bronze statue erected in Bar-le-Duc

- 1884: Chanzy debout Status of the general in undress, model for the bronze statue inaugurated in Buzancy, Ardennes, September 1884

— Monument à l'armée de la Loire, Bronze group erected at Le Mans on 16 August 1885. 1st class medal. Croisy was awarded the cross of the Legion of Honor for this work.

- 1886: Général Chanzy, bronze statue of the general in full uniform erected at Nouart, Ardennes on 17 July 1886
- 1887: Portrait de M. l’amiral Jauréguiberry, marble bust

— Portrait du M. le général Boulanger, ministre de la guerre, marble bust

- 1888: Portrait de M. Tirman, gouverneur général de l’Algérie, marble bust

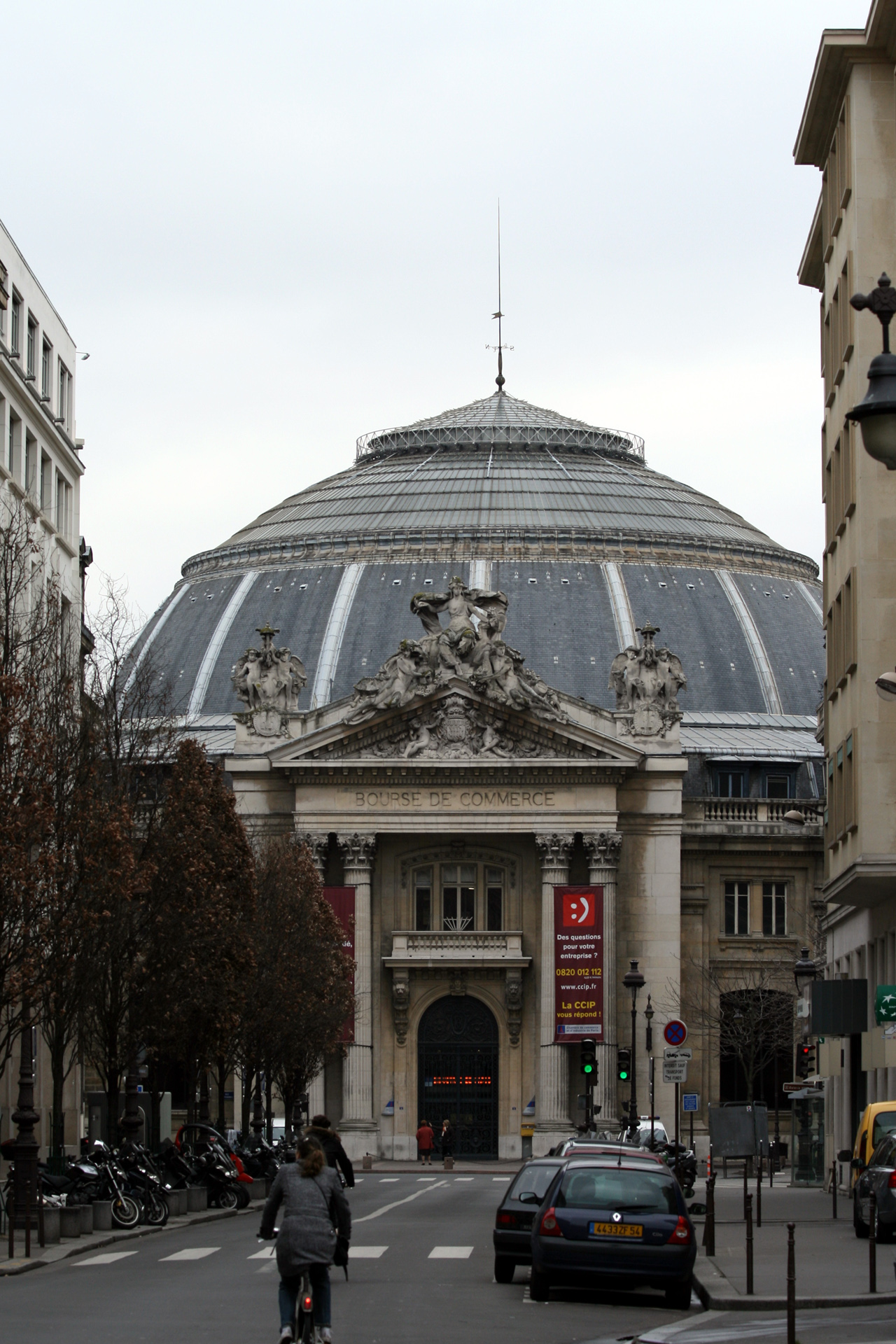
Bourse de commerce (Paris) (1889). Croisy made the sculptures on the entrance portico.

Other works exhibited at the Salon were:

- 1889: Mercure, statue for the garden of the Palais-Royal, Paris

— La Paix et la Concorde, front of the central dome of the Exposition universelle de 1889
— Front and statues for the Bourse de commerce (Paris)

- 1890: Méhul, bronze statue for the town of Givet

— Mme M., marble bust

- 1891: Deux anges, funeral group in marble for M. Kharitonenko
- 1891: Model of the Monument du héros national de Costa Rica, Juan Santamaria, erected at Alajuela
- 1893: Bayard, bronze statue for Charleville-Mézières
- 1894: Calvaire, marble group to decorate a tomb in Ukraine

— La Charge des chasseurs d’Afrique à Floing, le 1er septembre 1870, bas-relief model in plaster, part of the monument for Sedan

- 1895: Monument à la mémoire des soldats morts pour la patrie bronze group later erected in Sedan, Ardennes

— La Défense du pont de Bazeilles (1 août 1870), bas-relief in bronze
— M. Margaine, ancien questeur du Sénat, marble bust

- 1897: Moujik et enfants ukrainiens, plaster group for the foot of the monument erected to the memory of the Kharitonenko in Ukraine

— Le Général de Boisdeffre, statuette in bronze

- 1898: Baigneuse, statuette in bronze

== Sources ==
- Barou, Joseph (2006-10-13). "Quel beau nid !". La Gazette (in French).
- Champeaux, Alfred de (1886). "Croisy (Onésime-Aristide)". Dictionnaire des fondeurs, ciseleurs, modelleurs en bronze, et doreurs, depuis le moyen-âge jusqu'à l'époque actuelle (in French). J. Rouam.
- Chavignerie, Emile Bellier de la; Auvray, Louis (1882). Dictionnaire général des artistes de l'école française depuis l'origine des arts du dessin jusqu'à nos jours: architectes, peintres, sculpteurs, graveurs et lithographes. Renouard.
- Cole, Blanche Dougan (1899-12-15). "Foreign Notes: Paris Sketches". The Collector and Art Critic. 2 (4). Thomas J. Watson Library, The Metropolitan Museum of Art: 72–73. JSTOR 25435319.
- Elsen, Albert Edward (1985). The Gates of Hell by Auguste Rodin. Stanford University Press. ISBN 978-0-8047-1273-6.
- Henry, Ernest (1888). "Croisy (Onésime-Aristide)". Artistes ardennais contemporains: Notes biographiques (in French). impr. J. Laroche.
- Hillairet, Jacques (1978). "Connaissance du Vieux Paris" (in French). Editions de Minuit.
- Viollet-le-Duc, E.; de Baudot, A. (1865). Gazette des architectes et du bâtiment. A. Morel et cie.
