= Lycée Racine =

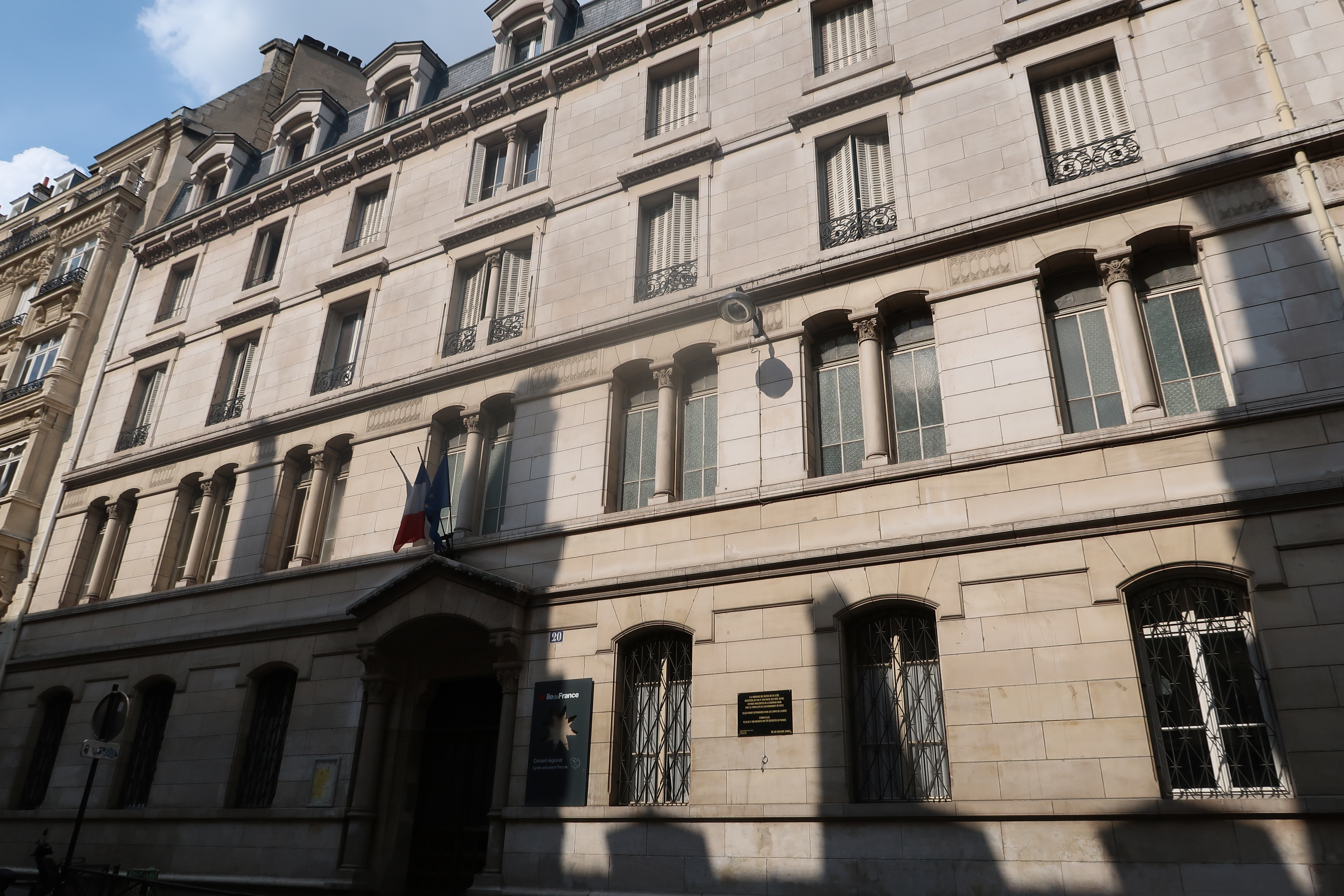

Location
- 20 rue du Rocher (site principal, Rocher); 38 rue de Naples (second site, Naples), Paris; France; 48.876472°N 2.322656°E

Information
- Type: Établissement public local d'enseignement (EPLE)
- Established: 1886
- Principal: Lucie PITIOT
- Staff: ~120 teachers
- Faculty: ~1,200 students
- Website: lyc-racine.ac-paris.fr

The lycée Racine is a public school in the quartier de l'Europe located in the 8th arrondissement of Paris. It consists of a lycée as well as BTS assistant manager and BTS bank staff courses. It takes the name of Jean Racine, playwright and historiographer to the King.

The main site is served by the métro stations of Saint-Lazare, Saint-Augustin and Europe. The second site (Naples) is served by the stations Villiers, Europe and Miromesnil.

== History ==
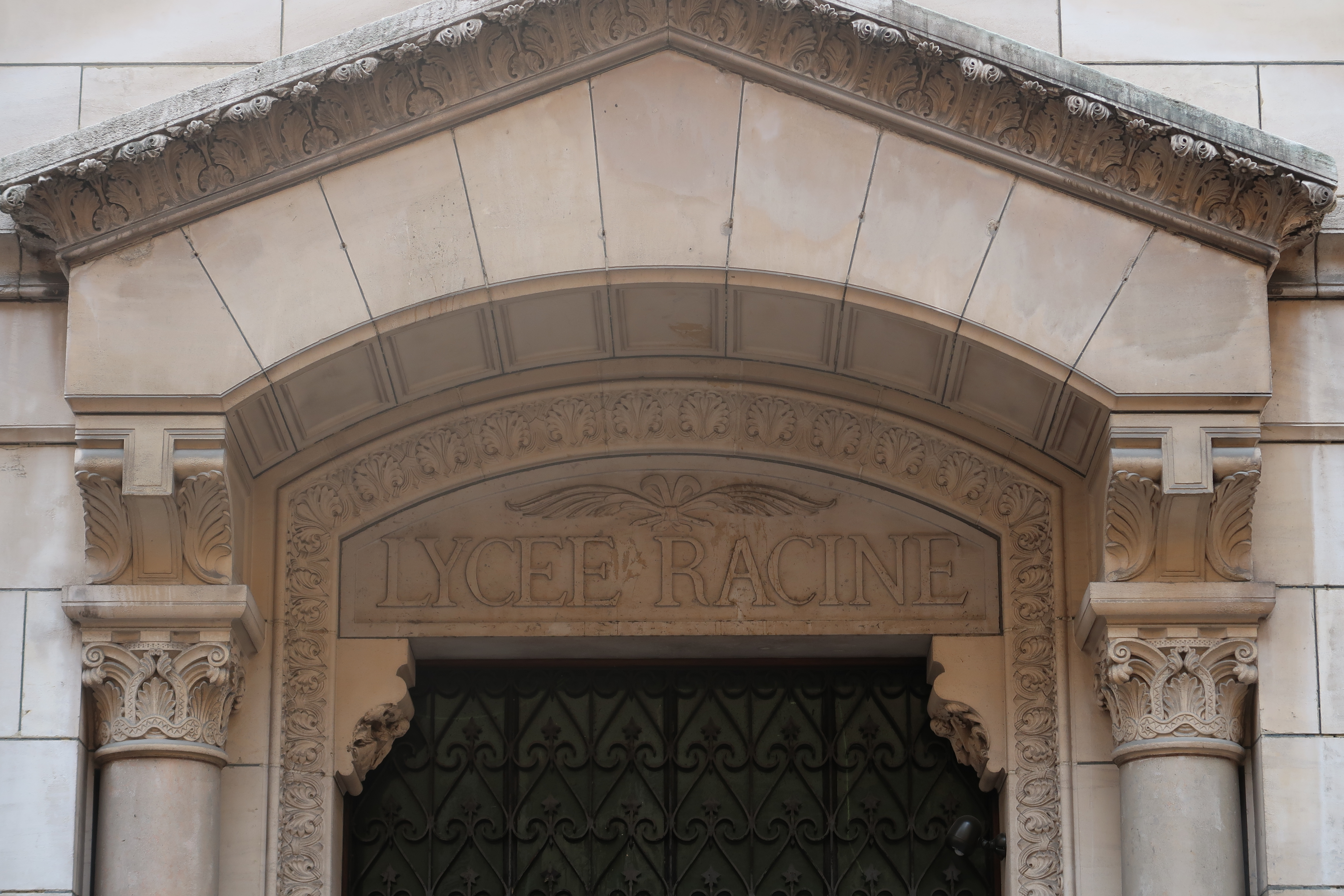
Porch.

Lycée Racine was built by the architect Paul Gout and opened in 1886. It was the second girls' school to open in Paris, after the lycée Fénelon.

The establishment bears the name of Jean Racine, French playwright of the 17th century.

== Organisation ==
The lycée is split into two sites: the main site is located at 20 rue du Rocher (Rocher), and the second site is located at 38 rue de Naples (Naples). The acquisition of the second site allowed the school to increase capacity, and start bilingual and trilingual BTS classes.

The sport classes take place in the gymnasium of Naples and in the outside areas. However, there are also some sport activities at Rocher.

Each site has its own school life, its own canteen, and its own library. Classes are run between the two sites, apart from the science track (S) and part-time courses (double courses in music and dance) which take place at Rocher for practical reasons.

== Classes ==
The lycée Racine includes part-time classes for those students involved in arts at a high level in national or regional conservatoires, etc. It has its own orchestra and choir.

Students are able to use their free time to practice the arts, and are offered parallel baccalauréats in literature and science.

The lycée has (school year 2016/2017) :

Class/Series	G&T	S	ES	L	STMG	BTS
Second	10					
First		5	2	3	2	
Last		5	3	4	2	
Supérieur (BTS 1&2)						4

There are currently around 1,200 and 120.

== Lycée ranking ==
In 2016, the lycée was ranked 68th out of 112 at départemental level in terms of teaching quality, and 652nd at national level. The ranking is based on three criteria: the level of bac results, the proportion of students obtaining their baccalauréat who spent their last two years at the establishment, and the value added (calculated based on social origin of the students, their age, and their national diploma results).

97% achieved in 2016. 100% in L.

== Alumni ==
=== Current and former teachers ===
- Lucie Blanquiès (1879–1961), scientist who worked in Marie Curie's laboratory 1908–1910
- Didier Blonde, writer (essays and theatre)
- Valérie Hannin, historian, editor of the magazine L'Histoire (history-geography)
- Vincent Warnier, organist (music)
- Jacques Bardin (writer)
- Lucie Aubrac

=== Former students ===
- Violette Leduc (1907–1972), novelist
- Jeanne Balibar (1968–), actress
- Pauline Benda a.k.a. Madame Simone (1877–1985), actress and academic
- Gabrielle Dorziat, actress
- Germaine Chénin-Moselly (1902–1950), engraver
- Madeleine Renaud (1900–1994), actress
- Mila Racine (1921–1945), resistant
- Monique Pelletier, politician
- Monique Canto-Sperber, philosopher
- Monique Cottret, historian
- Geneviève Page, actress
- Françoise Héritier, anthropologist
- Sabine Azéma, actress
- Élisabeth Roudinesco, psychoanalyst
- Isabelle Oehmichen, pianist
- Anne Brunswic, journalist and writer
- Élisabeth Platel, dancer, head of the school of dance of the Opéra de Paris
- Romane Bohringer, actress
- Alice Taglioni, pianist and actress
- Adèle Exarchopoulos, actress
- Kevin Razy, humorist
- Max Boublil, humorist
- Lola Créton, actress
- Patrick Dupond, dancer
- Thierry Malandain, choreographer, director of the ballet Biarritz
- Clément Ducol, orchestrator
- Marc Coppey, cellist
- Abdel Rahman El Bacha, pianist
- Clovis Cornillac, comedian
- Laurent Hilaire, dancer and master of the ballet of the Opéra de Paris.
- François-Xavier Roth, orchestrator
- Isabelle Guérin, dancer in the Ballet of the Opéra national de Paris
- Jean-François Zygel, pianist
- Jérôme Bonnell, director
- Pierre Pincemaille, musician and organist.

== See also ==
- History of the education of girls in France
  - Girls' schools
