= Monique Pelletier =

Monique Pelletier may refer to:

- Monique Pelletier (politician) (1926–2025), French judge and politician
- Monique Pelletier (historian) (1934–2020), French historian and cartographer, published on Oronce Fine
- Monique Pelletier (skier) (born 1969), American alpine skier
