= Edmond Toupet des Vignes =

French politician

Edmond Edouard Ernest Victor Toupet des Vignes
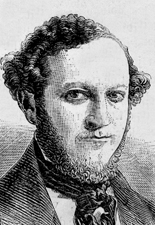
- Born: 5 September 1816; Givet, Ardennes, France
- Died: 21 June 1882 (aged 65); Givet, Ardennes, France
- Occupation: Politician

Edmond Edouard Ernest Victor Toupet des Vignes (5 September 1816 – 21 June 1882) was a French politician who sat in the legislature during the French Second Republic and the French Third Republic, and then became a senator. He was a firm believer in the republican form of government, and sat with the center left, but on topics such as religion held conservative views.

== Early years (1816–48) ==
Edmond Edouard Ernest Victor Toupet des Vignes was born on 5 September 1816 in Givet, Ardennes. He studied at the Collège Charlemagne, where he was a brilliant student, but did not continue as planned to the École Polytechnique. He returned to his home town where he became a member of the liberal opposition to the government of Louis Philippe I.

== Second French Republic and Empire (1848–70) ==
Toupet des Vignes commanded the National Guard of Givet during the revolution of February 1848. On 23 April 1848 he was elected to the Constituent Assembly as representative for the Ardennes. In his election campaign he demanded free and compulsory education, improvement of the lot of workers through progressive organization of work, and full liberty of association. He said "I was a republican before the glorious February revolution, I am a republican today, I will be a republican tomorrow. Toupet des Vignes joined the committee on Algeria in the Assembly. He voted with the moderate republicans, and was in favor of banishing the Orleans family. He was against the proposal for two chambers, the Rateau motion (Note: After Louis Napoleon had been elected President of the republic, Jean-Pierre Rateau proposed to dissolve the Constituent Assembly and elect a legislature before the organic laws had been agreed.) and the expedition to Rome. On 13 May 1849 he was reelected for the Ardennes to the Legislative Assembly.

Toupet des Vignes retired to private life after the coup of 2 December 1851. He was general councilor of his department from 1848 to 1870. This was the only public function he would accept under the Second French Empire. Toupet des Vignes ran for election to parliament on 1 June 1863 as an opposition candidate, but was defeated.

== Third French Republic (1871–82) ==
On 8 February 1871 Toupet des Vignes was elected representative of the Ardennes in the National Assembly, and took his seat with the Centre gauche parliamentary group. On several occasions he voted with the Right. On 14 June 1871 he seconded the motion by Louis Blanc that members of the government of national defense should have to account for the way in which they had exercised power during the Siege of Paris. He remained committed to the republican form of government. He was opposed to reintroduction of the monarchy, but on several occasions voted with the monarchists, particularly on questions of religion. He was in favor of public prayers and of rescinding the laws of exile and allowing the return to Paris of the royal family.

Toupet des Vignes was reelected councilor general for the canton of Givet on 8 October 1871. He was elected senator for the Ardennes on 30 January 1876, and again sat with the Center Left. The sculptor Aristide Croisy showed a bust of Toupet des Vignes at the Salon of 1876. Edmond Toupet des Vignes died on 21 June 1882 in Givet at the age of 65.

== Publications ==
- Toupet des Vignes, Edmond (1872). Rapport fait au nom de la Commission des Marchés chargée d'examiner tous les marchés passés par les administrations publiques depuis le 18 juilliet 1870. Cerf. p. 37.

== Sources ==
- Champeaux, Alfred de (1886). "Croisy (Onésime-Aristide)". Dictionnaire des fondeurs, ciseleurs, modelleurs en bronze, et doreurs, depuis le moyen-âge jusqu'à l'époque actuelle (in French). J. Rouam.
- Clère, Jules (1876). "TOUPET DES VIGNES (Edouard-Edmond-Ernest-Victorin)". Biographie complète des sénateurs (in French). Garnier.
- Glaeser, Ernest (1878). "TOUPET DES VIGNES (Edouard-Edmond-Ernest-Victorin)". Biographie nationale des contemporains (in French). Glaeser et cie.
- Robert, Adolphe; Cougny, Gaston (1889). "Toupet des Vignes (Edouard Edmond Ernest Victoire)" (PDF). Dictionnaire des parlementaires français de 1789 à 1889 (in French). Vol. 5, PLA à ZUY.
