= Pierre Camonin =

- Born: 25 February 1903; Bar-le-Duc, France
- Died: 14 November 2003 (aged 100); Verdun
- Education: Conservatoire de Paris
- Occupations: Classical organist; Composer

Pierre Camonin (25 February 1903 – 14 November 2003) was a French organist, composer and improviser.

== Biography ==
Born in Bar-le-Duc, Camonin was a student of Marcel Ciampi for the piano at the conservatoire de Paris. He studied pipe organ with Louis Vierne and Marcel Dupré. He was ordained a priest in 1929.

He was a vicar-organist at Ligny-en-Barrois, then organist in charge of the great organs of the Verdun Cathedral (where he succeeded Ernest Grosjean) alongside the maître de chapelle, canon Ferdinand Tourte. Its titulariate extended from 1935 until his death. Vincent Warnier was appointed co-titular in 1997. Several substitutes (Mr. Géhin, Vialette in the 1970s) generally provided the low masses.

Among the students of Canon Pierre Camonin who made a career as organist is Dominique Bréda (born in 1956), organist at St Léon in Nancy.

Pierre Camonin died in Verdun, Meuse.

== Works ==
- Messe mariale (organ, éd. Europart)
1. Prelude to a canticle by Charles Bordes
2. Offertoire on Tota pulchra es
3. Élévation on Ave Maria
4. Communion on Salve Regina
5. Toccata on Salve Mater
- Improvisation pour un 11 novembre (organ and brass; transcription for solo organ performed by the author at N. D. de Paris during a Sunday recital.)
- Noëls variés (orgue, éd. Europart).
1. Vêpres de Noël
2. Variations on Minuit sonne au clocher blanc
3. Variations on O Dieu, que n'étais-je en vie
4. Variations sur un noël alsacien
5. Trois noëls
- For a victory anniversary (organ, series Autour de la Marseillaise, ed. Chant du Monde)
- Sonata for trumpet and organ
- Toccata on Salve Mater (organ)
- Rhapsodie pascale (organ)
- Intermezzo (organ)
- Rondo sur un thème de Rameau (organ)
- Prélude to the introit Cibavit (organ)
- Postlude pour la Fête Dieu, on Tantum Ergo
- Le jongleur de Notre Dame (organ), one of his last compositions, a sort of self-portrait.
- Crépuscule (organ), also a latter work
- Presto (organ)
- Rhapsodie Johannique
1. Allegro maestro [sic, as recorded on a program]
2. Andante cantabile
3. Allegro final
- L'Église triomphante (organ)
  - "This piece is built on the Hymn of the Dedication: Coelestis Urbs Jerusalem, where the waiting and preparations for the final judgment take place successively, the call of the trumpets, the resurrection of the dead, the terror of the confounded wicked, the procession of the virgins, the triumph of the chosen" (extract of the program of the blessing of the rebuilt organs of N. D. de Verdun, 35 March 1935

== Discography ==
- 2 33 rpm 30 cm mono, 1960s, local publisher; Pierre Camonin performs his works
- CD K 617055 L'orgue en Lorraine, containing the transfert of recording 33 rpm (mono) of the improvisation for 11 November; Pierre Camonin (organ of N.D. de Verdun) and music of the 151° R.I.M de Metz
- CD UCD 16694 "Le grand orgue héroïque": prelude to marian mass; François Henri Houbart at the great organs of N. D. de Verdun
- CD Calliope CAL 6933 "Un Noël en Champagne" : Variations sur le noël lorrain "Minuit sonne au clocher blanc"; André Isoir at the organs of St Brice d'Aÿ
- CD REGCD155 "The Organ Club 75th Anniversary": Communion (and pieces by other composers); English organs and organists
- recital of 17 May 1987, Pierre Camonin at the great organs of N. D. de Verdun (private collection)
