= Élisabeth Brasseur =

French choral conductor (1896–1972)

- Born: Marie Josèphe Jeanne Élisabeth Brasseur; January 8, 1896; Verdun, Lorraine, France
- Died: November 23, 1972 (aged 76); Versailles, France
- Occupation: Choral conductor

Élisabeth Brasseur (8 January 1896 – 23 November 1972) was a French choral conductor. In 1920 she founded a choir which has borne her name since 1943.

== Biography ==
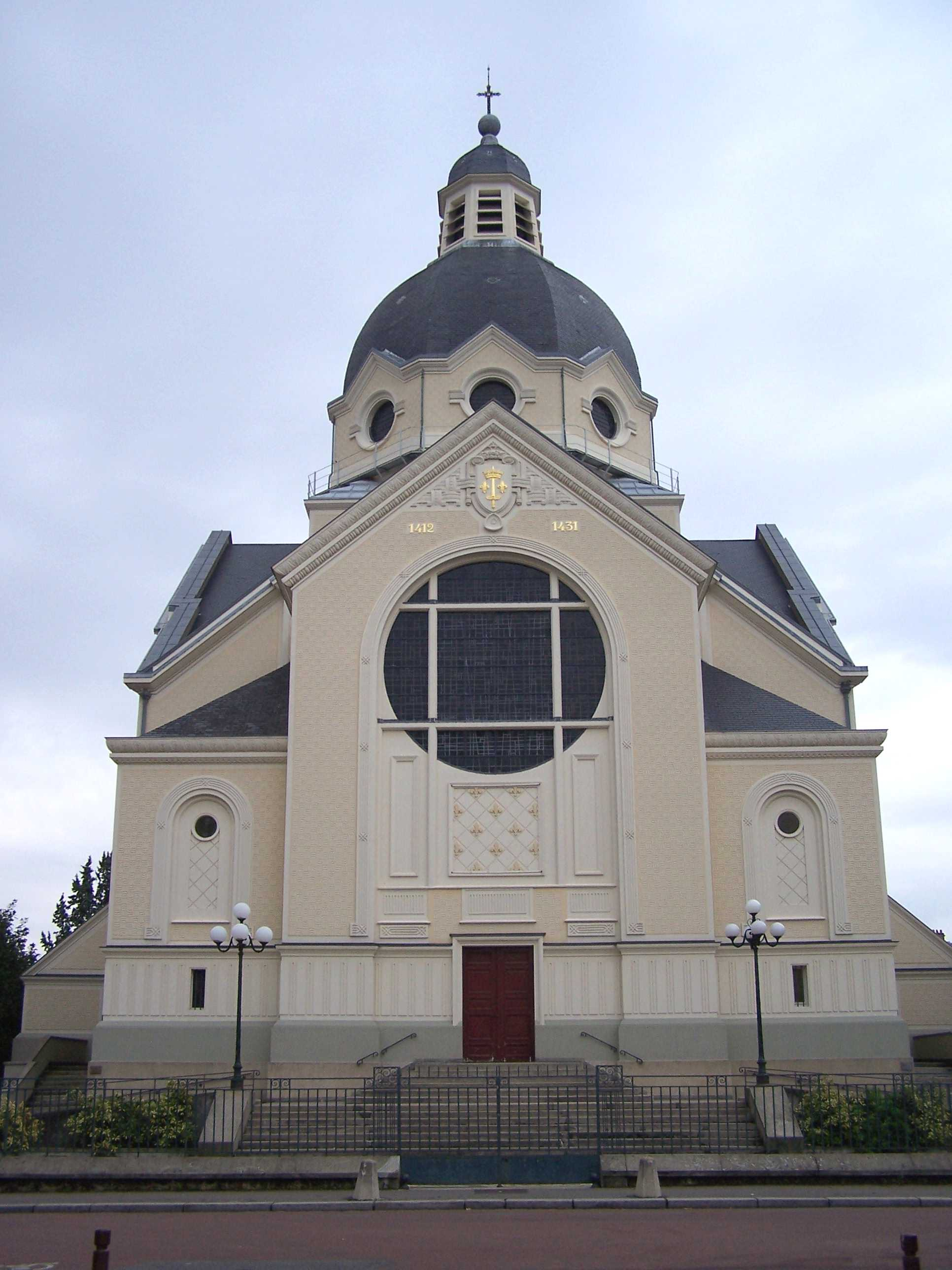
Église Sainte-Jeanne-d'Arc de Versailles, Place Élisabeth-Brasseur

Marie Josèphe Jeanne Élisabeth Brasseur was born in Verdun in Lorraine, to Jean Marie Joseph Brasseur, transport entrepreneur, and Marguerite Maria Grosjean. Élisabeth taste for music came from her maternal line: her grandfather Ernest Grosjean was organist of the Cathédrale Notre-Dame de Verdun and it was with him that she started studying music. She continued her singing and piano studies at the Versailles conservatory.

In 1920, Brasseur founded the women's Choir of the Église Sainte-Jeanne-d'Arc de Versailles, which later became mixed and took the name Chorale Élisabeth Brasseur in 1943. This was to become one of the most famous choir formations of the post-war period.

Under the direction of André Cluytens, she directed the choir of the Aix-en-Provence Festival in a production of Mireille by Charles Gounod. With Pierre Dervaux, she directed the Chœur du Conservatoire de Paris in a production of Dido and Æneas by Henry Purcell at the Aix-en-Provence Festival in 1960, which was recorded on disc.

For her long contribution to choral music, the city of Versailles, where she remained until her death on 23 November 1972, aged 77, named a place in her honour, Place Élisabeth-Brasseur, the location of the Sainte-Jeanne d'Arc church where she founded her first choir.

== Recordings ==
See the recordings with the Chorale Élisabeth Brasseur in the dedicated article.

- Charles Gounod: Mireille, choirs of the Aix-en-Provence Festival, choral conductor: Elisabeth Brasseur, Orchestre de la Société des concerts du Conservatoire, dir. André Cluytens (Grand Prix du disque of the Académie Charles-Cros).
- Henry Purcell: Dido and Æneas, Orchestre de la société des concerts du conservatoire, dir. Pierre Dervaux, Choir of the Conservatoire de Paris directed by Élisabeth Brasseur, Aix-en-Provence Festival, ed. Walhall; 1960.
- Jean-Philippe Rameau: Hippolyte et Aricie, Orchestre de la société des concerts du conservatoire, dir. Jacques Jouineau, artistic direction Gabriel Dussurget, choirs Elisabeth Brasseur, dir. Élisabeth Brasseur. Cour d'honneur du Palais Soubise Festival du Marais 1964.

== Bibliography ==
- Vignal, Marc (1988). Dictionnaire de la musique française. Larousse. ISBN 2-03-720038-2.
