= Ernest Bradfer =

French politician and iron master

Jean-Baptiste Christophe Ernest Bradfer
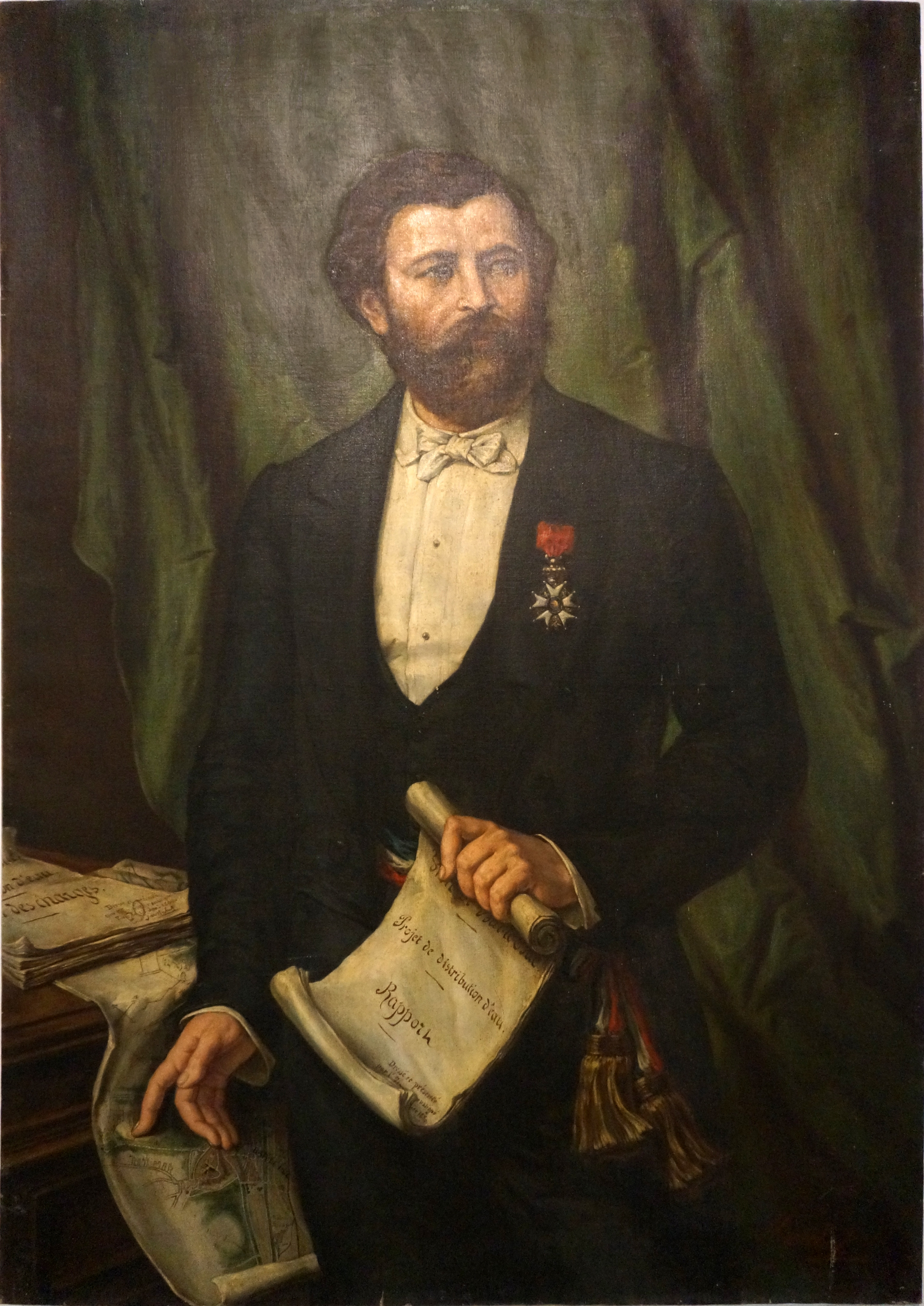
- Ernest Bradfer c. 1880 by Laurent-Charles Maréchal
- Born: 29 March 1833; Nantois, Meuse, France
- Died: 9 June 1882 (aged 49); Bar-le-Duc, Meuse, France
- Occupation: Iron master

Jean-Baptiste Christophe Ernest Bradfer (29 March 1833 – 9 June 1882) was a French iron master and politician who was active in local politics in Bar-le-Duc, Meuse.

== Life ==
Ernest Bradfer was born in Nantois on 29 March 1833. His father was Jean-Baptiste Bradfer (1808–88). Ernest was educated in Nancy, Bar-le-Duc, Paris and then Strasbourg. The Bradfers were both ironmasters and industrialists in Naix-aux-Forges and Bar-le-Duc. In 1859 they partnered with the ironmaster Joseph-Bernard Viry and his son Louis to open a foundry and blast furnace in Bar-le-Duc. In 1866 they bought out Viry and the Bradfer-Viry company became Bradfer père et fils (Bradfer Father & Son). It produced iron piping for water and gas. Ernest then bought the mines in Maron, Meurthe-et-Moselle. In 1876 they joined with Antoine Aubin Durenne, who owned the patent for the Lavril pipe connector, and founded "Bradfer et fils & Cie A.A. Durenne".

Ernest Bradfer was elected municipal councilor twice. In 1879 he became mayor of Bar-le-Duc. On 21 May 1880 he was named a Chevalier of the Legion of Honour. Ernest Bradfer died in Bar-le-Duc in 1882. His parents followed his wish and built a school in 1885, mainly for the children of the employees in their factories. In 1886 a statue of Bradfer by Onésyme-Aristide Croisy was erected, surrounded by four lions. The statue and the magnificent lions, which are each different, are in the court of the school. A street was named after him.

== Sources ==
- Auzias, Dominique; Labourdette, Jean-Paul (2015-06-16). Lorraine 2015 (avec cartes, photos + avis des lecteurs). Petit Futé. ISBN 978-2-7469-9414-0.
- "Des Barisiens célèbres: Ernest BRADFER (1833-1882)" (in French). Ville de Bar le Duc. Archived from the original on 2015-04-14.
- "Légion d'Honneur: Bradfer" (in French). Ministry of Culture. 1880-05-21.
- "Monument à Ernest Bradfer à Bar-le-Duc". Petit Partimoine (in French).
