= Pierre Steinmetz =

Member of the Constitutional Council
- In office 10 March 2004 – 8 March 2013
- Appointed by: Jacques Chirac
- President: Pierre Mazeaud; Jean-Louis Debré
- Preceded by: Monique Pelletier
- Succeeded by: Nicole Maestracci

Personal details
- Born: 23 January 1943 (age 83) Sainte-Colombe, France
- Education: Sciences Po, ÉNA
- Profession: Prefect

Pierre Steinmetz (born 23 January 1943) was a member of the Constitutional Council of France between 2004 and 2013.
