= Albert Cim =

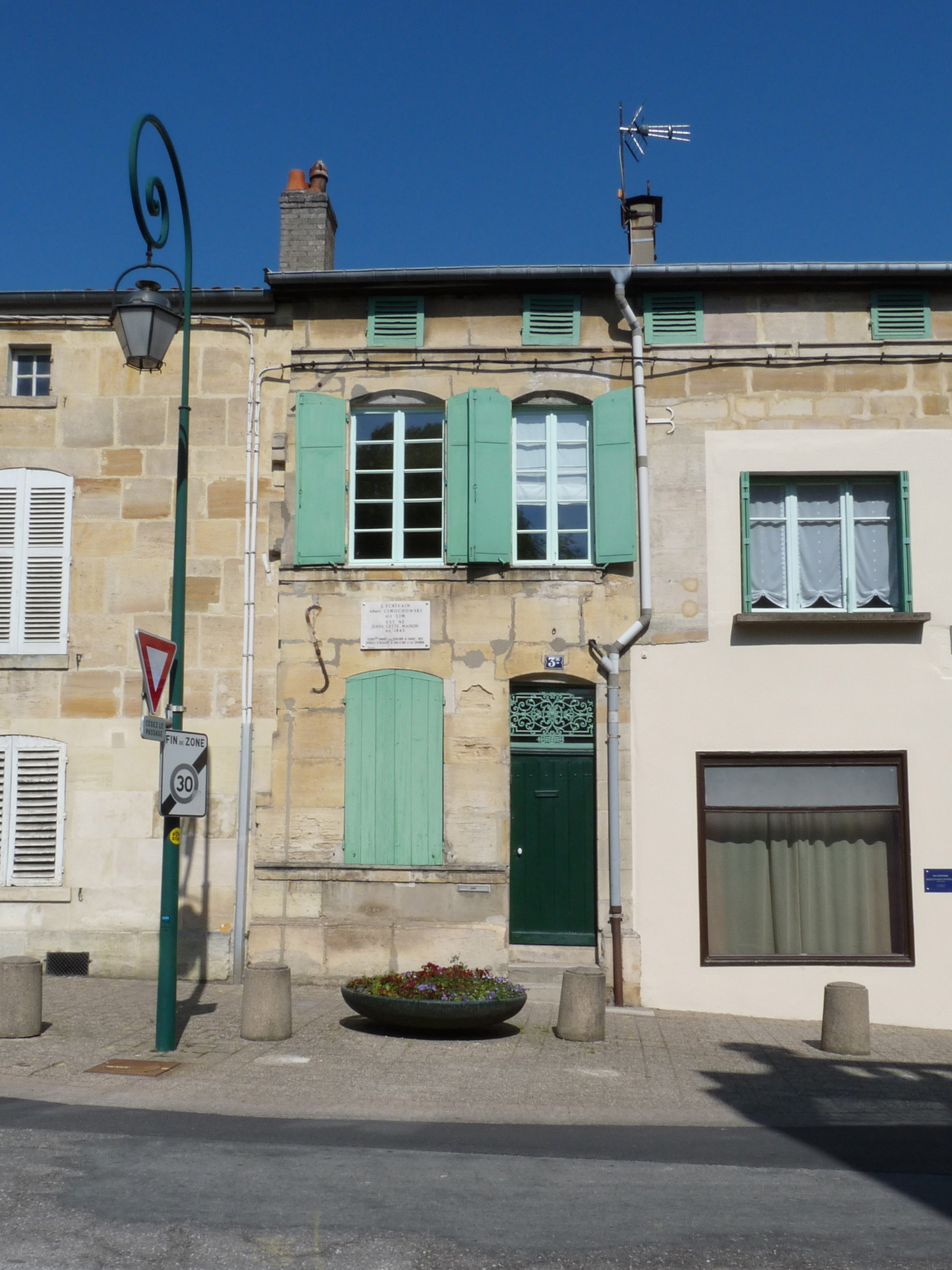
- Birth house of Albert Cim in Bar-le-Duc
- Born: 22 October 1845; Bar-le-Duc
- Died: 8 May 1924 (aged 78); Paris
- Occupations: Novelist; Critic; Bibliographer

Albert-Antoine Cimochowski, called Albert Cim, (22 October 1845 – 8 May 1924) was a French novelist, literary critic and bibliographer.

== Biography ==
Albert Cimochowski, born to a French mother and a Polish officer who fled to France after the 1830 November Uprising, began a career in public service with the Postes et télégraphes in Paris in 1861. Writing under the name Albert Cim, he entered journalism, producing articles on philology, criticism, and bibliography, pieces that were quickly noticed. He collaborated with many newspapers, including "lights" ones (La Gaudriole) and held the Revue littéraire column of Le Radical from 1881 to 1894, then of the National from 1895 to 1897. He also participated in writing the Dictionnaire de la langue française by Littré. Meanwhile, he published books for children and novels, which earned him the title of five-time winner of the Académie française, and documentary, literary, and bibliographic studies. In 1896, he was appointed a librarian by the Under Secretary for Postes and Telegraphs. He was also a member of the Société des gens de lettres of which he was twice the vice-president.

== Works ==
- 1880: Jeunesse, mœurs de province
- 1885: Service de nuit
- 1887: Amis d'enfance
- 1887: Institution de demoiselles, mœurs parisiennes
- 1888: Deux malheureuses Text online
- 1888: La Rue des Trois Belles
- 1889: Un Coin de province
- 1890: Les Prouesses d'une fille
- 1891: Bas-Bleus
- 1892: Bonne Amie
- 1893: En pleine gloire, histoire d'une mystification
- 1893: Spectacles enfantins
- 1894: Demoiselles à marier
- 1894: Joyeuse Ville
- 1894: Histoire d'un baiser Text online
- 1895: Fils unique. Le neveu de Mlle Papillon Text online
- 1896: Le Célèbre Barastol, vie et aventures d'un commis voyageur
- 1896: Grand'-Mère et petit-fils
- 1896: Fils unique. Le Neveu de Mlle Papillon
- 1897: Césarin, histoire d'un vagabond Text online
- 1898: La Petite Fée
- 1898: Jeunes Amours
- 1899: Émancipées
- 1900: Farceurs
- 1900: Mademoiselle Cœur d'Ange, histoire d'une tante, de ses neveux, de ses nièces et de ses bêtes
- 1902: Une bibliothèque : l'art d'acheter les livres, de les classer, de les conserver et de s'en servir Text online
- 1903: Le Dîner des gens de lettres : souvenirs littéraires Text online
- 1903: Amateurs et voleurs de livres : emprunteurs indélicats, voleurs par amour des livres, voleurs par amour de l'argent; vols dans les bibliothèques publiques, chez les éditeurs, libraires, bouquinistes, etc. (Reprint: Ides et Calendes, Neuchâtel, 1998).
- 1903: Le Petit Léveillé Text online
- 1904: Le Roman d'un bon garçon
- 1904: Contes et souvenirs de mon pays Text online
- 1905: Mes amis et moi
- 1905–1908: Le Livre : historique, fabrication, achat, classement, usage et entretien (5 volumes)
- 1906: Les Quatre fils Hémon
- 1910: Le Chansonnier Émile Debraux, roi de la goguette, 1796-1831
- 1910: Bureaux et bureaucrates, mémoires d'un employé des PTT
- 1911: La Revanche d'Absalon
- 1912: Disparu ! Histoire d'un enfant perdu
- 1912: Mes vacances : chasse à l'ours; deux amis, le père Laverdure et son chien Finaud; la brouette de mon grand-père; pensionnaires !… etc., etc.
- 1913: Le Gros Lot
- 1913: Mystificateurs et mystifiés célèbres
- 1914: Entre camarades
- 1919: Les Coulisses du monde littéraire : Nina de Villard et son salon
- 1919: Les Femmes et les livres
- 1920: Récréations littéraires. Curiosités et singularités, bévues et lapsus, etc. Text online
- 1921: Nouvelles Récréations littéraires et historiques. Curiosités et Singularités. Bévues et Lapsus, etc. Historiens. Philosophes. Orateurs. Médecins. Politiciens. Journalistes. Ecclésiastiques. Femmes écrivains. Appendice. Coquilles typographiques
- 1921: Deux cousins
- 1923: Petit Manuel de l'amateur de livres (multiples formats Text online)
- 1924: Amis d'enfance
- 1924: Le Travail intellectuel. L'ordre, la clarté, l'écriture, manies des écrivains Text online

== Sources ==
- Biographical elements after C.-E. Curinier, Dictionnaire national des contemporains, vol. II, 1899-1919, (p. 329–330)
