= Nantois =

- Commune
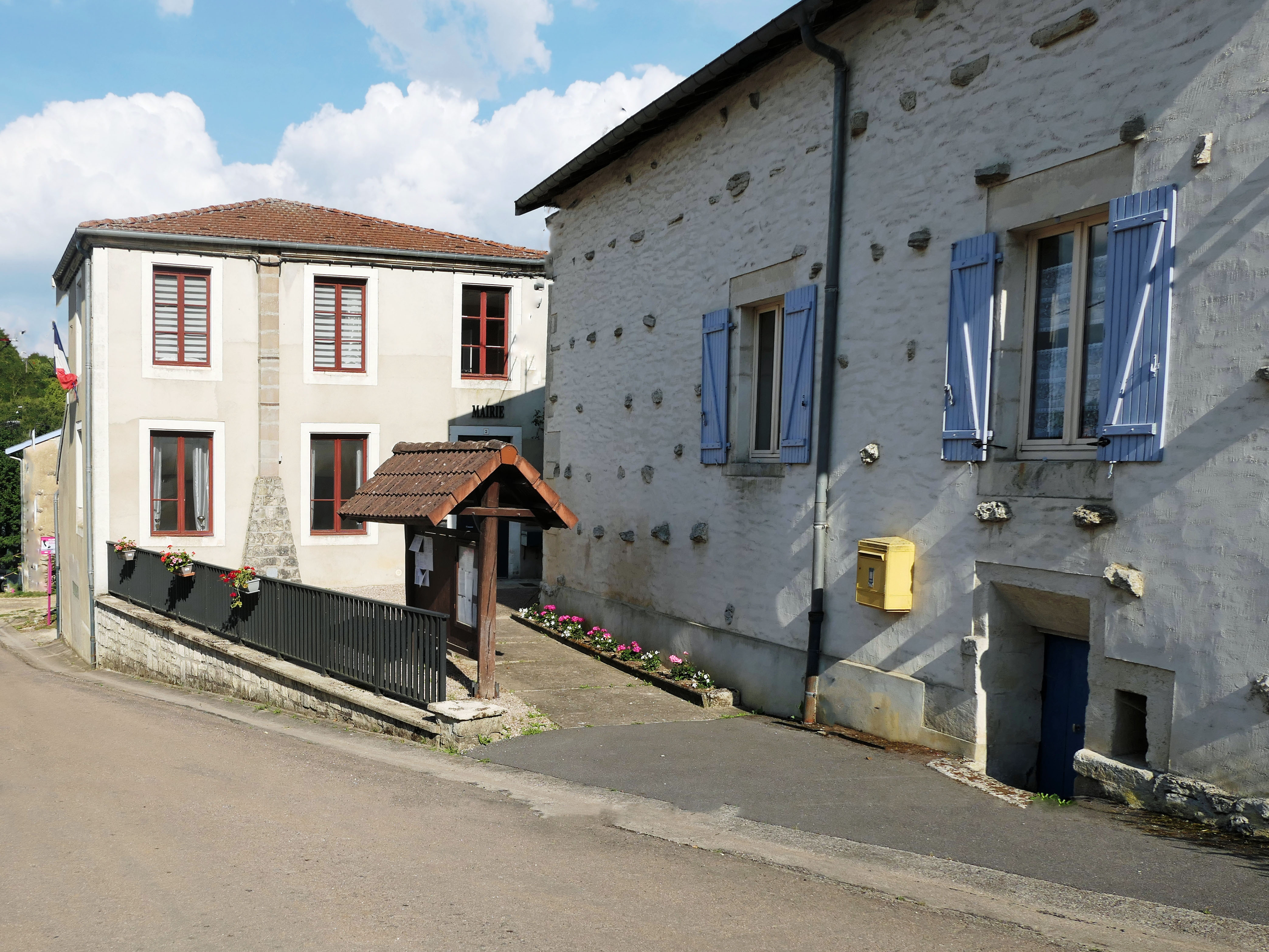

- Coat of arms
- Location of Nantois
- Location within France Location within Grand Est
- Coordinates: 48°38′18″N 5°21′07″E
- Country: France
- Region: Grand Est
- Department: Meuse
- Arrondissement: Bar-le-Duc
- Canton: Ligny-en-Barrois
- Intercommunality: CA Bar-le-Duc - Sud Meuse

Government
  - Mayor (2020–2026): Marie-Françoise Navelot
- Area^{1}: 6.05 km^{2} (2.34 sq mi)
- Elevation: 289 m (948 ft)
- Highest elevation: 342 m (1,122 ft)
- Lowest elevation: 234 m (768 ft)
- Population (2023): 73
  - Density: 12/km^{2} (31/sq mi)
- Time zone: UTC+01:00 (CET)
  - Summer (DST): UTC+02:00 (CEST)
- INSEE/Postal code: 55376 /55500
- ^{1} French Land Register data, which excludes lakes, ponds, glaciers > 1 km^{2} (0.386 sq mi or 247 acres) and river estuaries.

Nantois (French pronunciation: [nɑ̃twa]) is a commune in the Meuse department in Grand Est in north-eastern France. It is 21 km from Bar-le-Duc, the department capital.

== Notable people ==
- Ernest Bradfer (1833–1882), iron master and politician born in Nantois

== See also ==
- Communes of the Meuse department
