= Nicole Maestracci =

French lawyer and magistrate (1951–2022)

Member of the Constitutional Council
- In office 14 March 2013 – 13 March 2022
- Appointed by: François Hollande
- President: Jean-Louis Debré; Laurent Fabius
- Preceded by: Pierre Steinmetz
- Succeeded by: Jacqueline Gourault

Personal details
- Born: 13 February 1951 Paris, France
- Died: 7 April 2022 (aged 71) Paris, France
- Education: French National School for the Judiciary
- Profession: Lawyer

Nicole Maestracci (13 February 1951 – 7 April 2022) was a French lawyer and magistrate. She was a member of the Constitutional Council between 2013 and 2022. She died on 7 April 2022 at the age of 71.

== Biography ==
Born into a family of six children, whose father was a high-ranking civil servant of Corsican origin, she was an early activist in the “Trotskyism student movement” and later in the Syndicat de la Magistrature. After graduating in law and literature, she passed her bar exam. She was a member of the Paris Bar from 1974 to 1977.

A judicial auditor in 1977, she began her career as a magistrate as a juvenile court judge in Melun (1979-1982), then as a sentence enforcement judge in Paris (1983-1984). She then joined the central administration of the Ministry of Justice (1984-1987).

Advisor to the Interministerial Delegate for Road Safety at the Ministry of Public Works from 1987 to 1988, she became technical advisor to the Keeper of the Seals, Minister of Justice Pierre Arpaillange and Henri Nallet from 1988 to 1992. She then served as a sentence enforcement judge in Bobigny (1992-1996), then as an advisor and chamber president at the Paris Court of Appeal (1996-1998). She then headed the Interministerial Mission to Combat Drugs and Drug Addiction (MILDT) from 1998 to 2002, before becoming President of the Melun Regional Court from 2003 to 2010.

Former President of FNARS (2004-2012) and First President of the Rouen Court of Appeal since September 2011, she is Chair of the organizing committee for the consensus conference on the prevention of recidivism, which presented its conclusions to the Keeper of the Seals, Minister of Justice on February 20, 2013.

Nicole Maestracci is considered “a figure” of the Syndicat de la Magistrature.

On February 12, 2013, she was appointed by François Hollande, President of the Republic, to sit on the Constitutional Council (France) for a nine-year term. On the following March 14, she was sworn in by the President of the Republic.

She died on April 7, 2022 in Paris, aged 71.
