= Jacqueline Gourault =

French politician

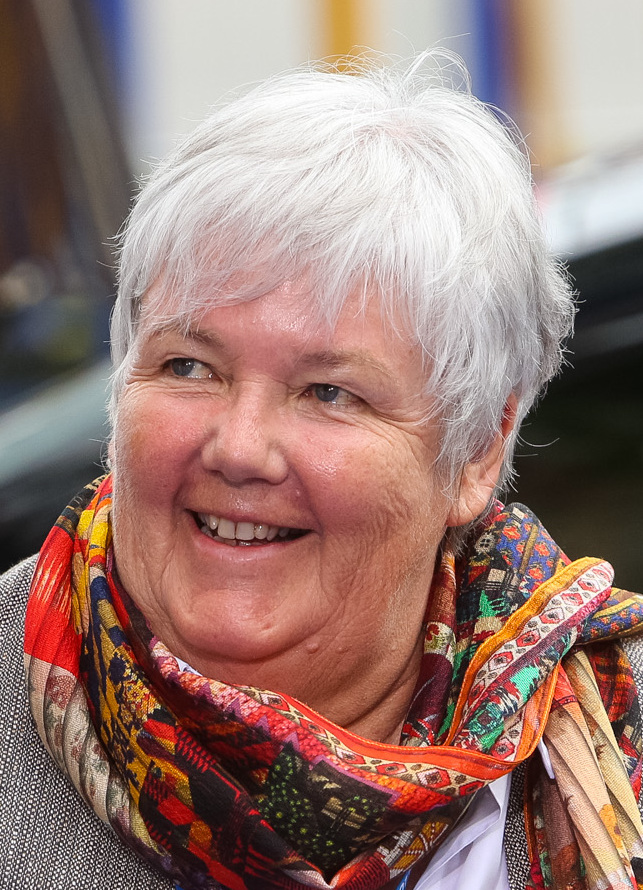
- Gourault in 2017

Member of the Constitutional Council
- Incumbent
- Assumed office 14 March 2022
- Appointed by: Emmanuel Macron
- President: Laurent Fabius
- Preceded by: Nicole Maestracci

Minister of Territorial Cohesion and Relations with Local Authorities
- In office 16 October 2018 – 5 March 2022
- Prime Minister: Édouard Philippe; Jean Castex
- Preceded by: Jacques Mézard
- Succeeded by: Joël Giraud

Delegate Minister to the Minister of the Interior
- In office 21 June 2017 – 16 October 2018
- Prime Minister: Édouard Philippe

Senator for Loir-et-Cher
- In office 1 October 2001 – 22 Juillet 2017

Mayor of La Chaussée-Saint-Victor
- In office 20 March 1989 – 30 March 2014
- Preceded by: Danièle Charron
- Succeeded by: Stéphane Baudu

Personal details
- Born: Jacqueline Doliveux; 20 November 1950 (age 75) Montoire-sur-le-Loir, France
- Party: UDF (until 2007); MoDem (from 2007)

Jacqueline Gourault (French: [ʒa.klin ɡu.ʁo]; née Doliveux, born 20 November 1950) is a French politician of the Democratic Movement (MoDem) who served as Minister of Territorial Cohesion and Relations with Local Authorities in the governments of successive Prime Ministers Édouard Philippe and Jean Castex from 2018 to 2022. She previously served as Minister attached to the Minister of the Interior from 2017 to 2018. In 2022, she was appointed to the Constitutional Council by President Emmanuel Macron.

== Early life and education ==
Born Jacqueline Doliveux, she is the daughter of a livestock dealer in Montoire-sur-le-Loir, Martial. His wife Madeleine worked with him. Her husband, Gérard, took over the horse breeding of his father. A history and geography teacher, including at high school Sainte-Marie de Blois, she became active in politics in 1974, during the campaign of Valéry Giscard d'Estaing.

== Political career ==
=== Mayor of La Chaussée-Saint-Victor ===
Elected a municipal councillor in 1983, Gourault served as Mayor of La Chaussée-Saint-Victor from 1989 to 2014.

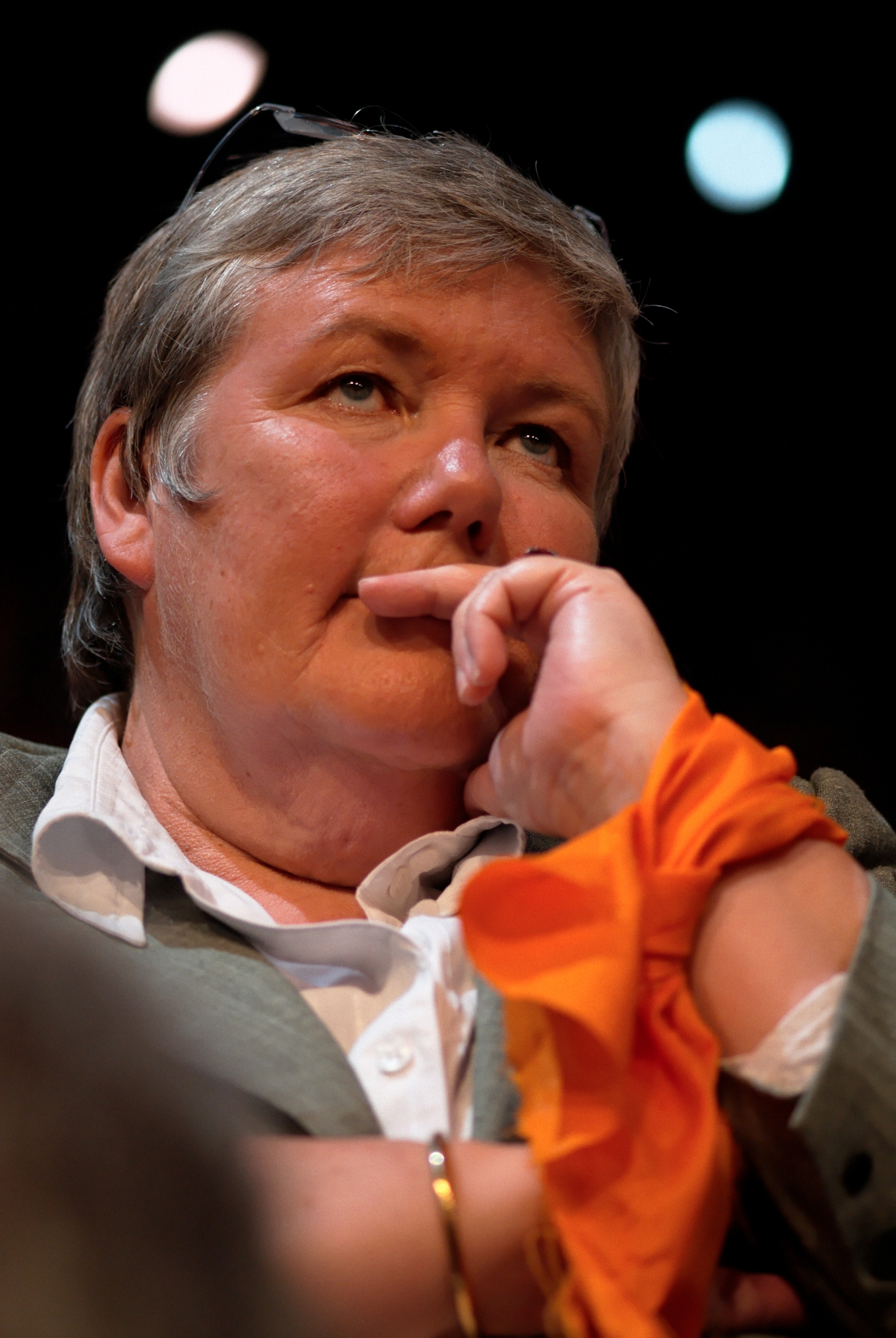
Gourault at a François Bayrou rally for the 2007 presidential election

In the weeks prior to the 1993 legislative election, Gourault emerged on the departmental political scene by campaigning against Socialist Jack Lang, then Mayor of Blois. Although he was reelected with 51.5% of the vote, she managed to have his election nullified by the Constitutional Council, which also sentenced him to one year of ineligibility. In the 1994 by-election, the Socialist candidate Michel Fromet, Jack Lang's substitute in 1993, was elected with 59.7% of the vote. In 1997, she returned for the legislative election and was again defeated (46.8%) by Lang.

In 2014, Gourault returned as a municipal councillor of La Chaussée-Saint-Victor on the list led by Stéphane Baudu, who subsequently assumed the mayorship.

=== Senator for Loir-et-Cher ===
Gourault led the campaign for the Union for French Democracy's Nicolas Perruchot, who became mayor of the city of Blois in the 2001 municipal elections. The same year, she was elected, in the first round, a member of the Senate, representing the Loir-et-Cher department. In the 2004 regional election in Centre, she led the UDF list, which placed third.

Gourault later became part of the leadership team of the Democratic Movement, officially created on 1 December 2007 at the initiative of former presidential candidate François Bayrou, who assumed its leadership. He included her in his shadow cabinet in 2010, in preparation for the 2012 presidential election; in this capacity, Gourault served as opposition counterpart to Minister of Education Luc Chatel.

Gourault was reelected a Senator for Loir-et-Cher in the first round, with 53.2% of the vote, in the 2011 Senate election. In October 2014, she was elected to the vice presidency of the Senate.

Gourault supported Alain Juppé in the 2016 The Republicans presidential primary. She supported Emmanuel Macron in the 2017 presidential election. In the 2017 Senate election, Gourault was reelected Senator for Loir-et-Cher.

=== Member of the Government ===
On 21 June 2017, Gourault was appointed minister attached to Minister of State, Minister of the Interior Gérard Collomb.

On 12 December 2017, Prime Minister Édouard Philippe entrusted Gourault with the informal function of monitoring the "Corsican file", following the victory of the nationalists in the territorial election. In 2018, Philippe mandated her with the mission of opening the dialogue between the local elected officials of the Haut-Rhin and Bas-Rhin to organise the merger of these two departments.

On 16 October 2018, Gourault was appointed Minister of Territorial Cohesion and Relations with Local Authorities, succeeding Jacques Mézard.

On 5 March 2022 a relatively minor cabinet reshuffle was announced, with Jacqueline Gourault stepping down and being replaced in her role as Minister of Territorial Cohesion and Relations with Local Authorities by Secretary of State Joël Giraud. On the same day, she was appointed to the Constitutional Council. She took office on 14 March 2022.

Political offices
Preceded by Jacques Mézard	Minister of Territorial Cohesion; 2018–2022	Succeeded by Joël Giraud
Legal offices
Preceded by Nicole Maestracci	Member of the Constitutional Council; 2022–present	Incumbent
