= Ernest Grosjean =

French organist and composer

Ernest Grosjean (18 December 1844 – 28 December 1936) was a French organist and composer.

== Biography ==
Born in Vagney (Vosges), Ernest Grosjean was the nephew and pupil of Jean-Romary Grosjean, founder and director of the Journal des organistes.

In addition to his uncle, he had successively Henri Hess, Camille-Marie Stamaty and Alexis Chauvet as masters of piano, organ, harmony, music composition and fugue.

He made his debut as organist in the cathedral of Uzès (Gard) in 1864, before competing for the position of organist, and later of maître de chapelle of the Verdun Cathedral, that he held from 1868 until 1935, even though the Jacquot-Jeanpierre organ of Rambervillers (Vosges), built in 1898, was dismantled during the First World War to preserve it. The instrument was rebuilt and inaugurated on 25 March 1935 jointly by the titular master Marcel Dupré and abbot Pierre Camonin who succeeded him in June of the same year.

Grosjean was the maternal grandfather of Élisabeth Brasseur, a choral conductor who founded and directed in Versailles the Chorale Élisabeth Brasseur from 1920 to her death in 1972.

Grosjean died in Versailles at the age of 92 on 28 December 1936.

== Publications ==
Grosjean wrote teaching works including a harmony course, which earned him the approval of several eminent composers; a quantity of works for the organ, 30 Verse, 82 Pieces, etc.; works for voices, piano and various instruments.

- Soixante-dix pièces faciles for organ (reprint Musica Rinata, 2007).
- Pièces pour orgue ou harmonium (reprint Armelin Musica, 2007).
- Noël d'alsace et de Lorraine.
- Les anges dans nos campagnes, variations for organ.
- Offertoire O filii et filiæ - pour le temps pascal.
- Marche nuptiale, in the Journal des Organistes, reprinted by abbott Delépine in the Échos Jubilaires des Maîtres de l’Orgue (v. 1908).
- Aria cantabile for organ, in the Journal des Organistes (1880).
- Memento for organ, ed. Combre.

In the séries Les Maîtres Contemporains de l'Orgue (1912) by abbot Joseph Joubert:

- Offertoire bref or Communion
- Prélude
- Méthode pour l'accompagnement du chant grégorien, Saint-Laurent-sur-Sèvre: L.-J. Biton (1917).

== Sources ==
- Biographical notes published in Joseph Joubert, Maîtres contemporains de l'orgue, volume I, Édition Maurice Senart and Cie, 1912, p. 4.
