= Vincent Warnier =

French classical organist

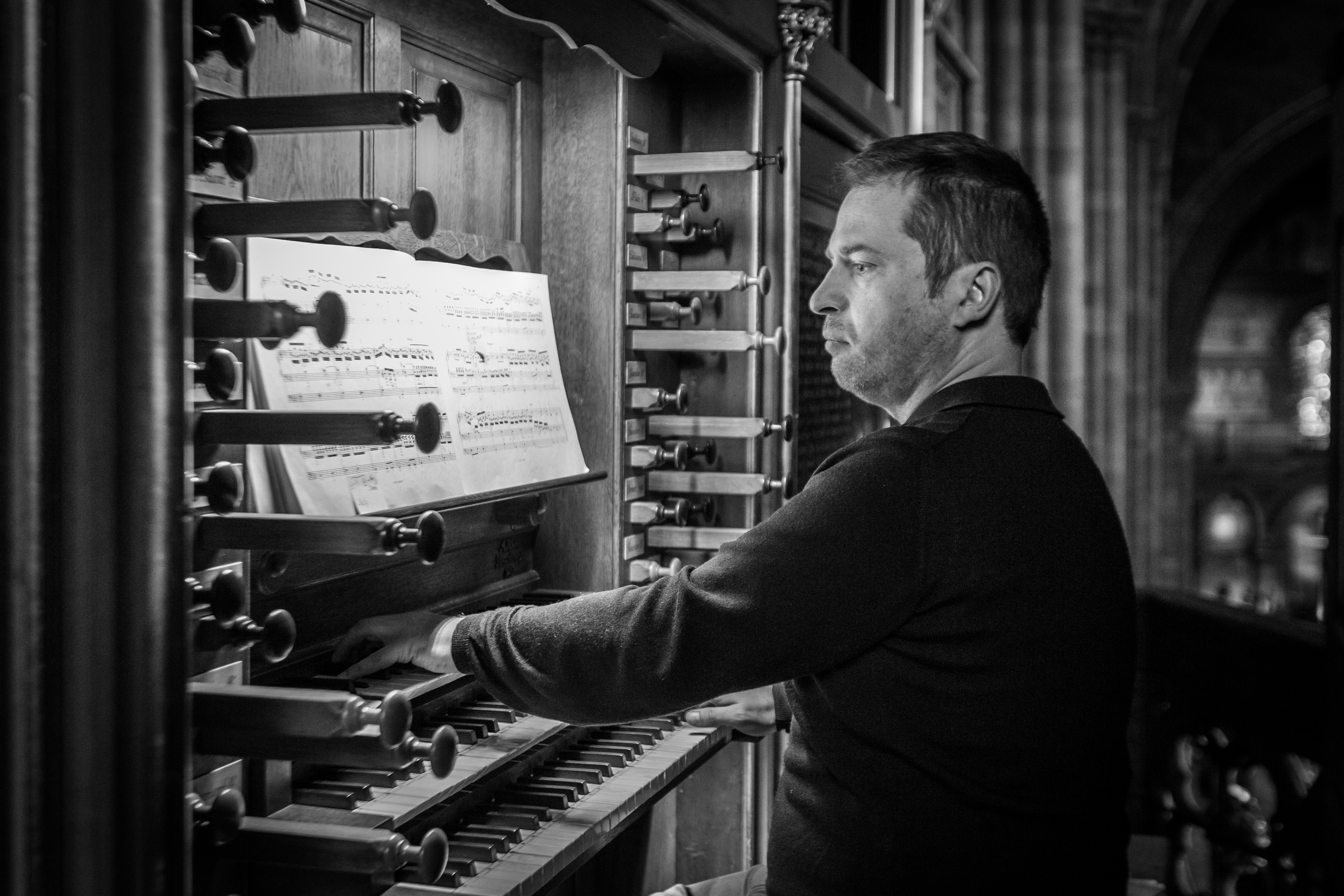
Vincent Warnier playing the organ of Strasbourg Cathedral, April 2015.

Vincent Warnier (born 14 October 1967) is a contemporary French classical organist.

== Biography ==
Born in Hayange (Moselle), Warnier completed his musical studies at the Conservatoire de Strasbourg (organ class of Daniel Roth and André Stricker), the Conservatoire of Rueil-Malmaison (class of Marie-Claire Alain) and the Conservatoire de Paris, where he won numerous prizes (organ with Michel Chapuis and Olivier Latry).

In 1992, he was awarded the first prize for interpretation at the Chartres Grand Prix.

In 1995, he became co-titular organist of the Reformed Church of the Annunciation in Paris. Then, in 1997, he became co-titular organist with Thierry Escaich, of the Saint-Étienne-du-Mont church in Paris. That same year, he was entrusted with the grand Théodore Jacquot organ of Verdun Cathedral, succeeding canon Pierre Camonin. He has been in residence at the Auditorium-Orchestre national de Lyon since September 2013.

Considered a leading instrumentalist and improviser, Vincent Warnier leads an international concert career. He performs regularly in Japan and the main European countries. His attachment to a second profession which he leads in parallel with the first is also worth noting: that of music teacher. An associate professor, he taught at the Poitiers University, then at the College Stanislas de Paris. He is now a professor in the specialized music sections of the Lycée Racine (Paris).

Regularly invited on the airwaves of France Musique, he participated from 2011 to 2013 in Benjamin François' weekly disc review show, Le Jardin des critiques, then was a columnist on his Sunday show Musiques sacrées. After being a regular contributor to Renaud Machart's program Le Matin des musiciens, he continues this collaboration today in Le Mitan des musiciens.

== Discography ==
Vincent Warnier's discography is rich with about twenty recordings ranging from Johann Sebastian Bach to contemporary music: Thierry Escaich, Éric Tanguy, Jacques Lenot. Since 2002, his recordings have been published at Intrada.

=== Most recent recordings ===
- Autour du concerto de Poulenc (Intrada, 2006)

Francis Poulenc: Concerto for organ - Jean-Philippe Rameau: excerpts from Indes galantes, the Bourgeois gentilhomme and Dardanus - Daniel Roth: Licht im Dunkel, poem for orchestra - Jacques Lenot: La Gerusalemme celeste, for organ and orchestra (world premiere, first worldwide recording: Les Siècles - François-Xavier Roth, direction; Recorded on 28 and 29 April 2006 in Saint-Étienne-du-Mont

- Maurice Duruflé: intégrale de l'œuvre pour orgue (Intrada, 2007); Recorded in Saint-Étienne-du-Mont from 22 to 24 January 2006
- Johann Sebastian Bach; Ultima verba (Intrada, 2008): Autour des 18 Chorals "de Leipzig" and the Variations canoniques; Recorded from 12 to 14 September 2007 at Masevaux (Haut-Rhin)
- Johann Sebastian Bach: Toccatas et Fugues (Intrada, 2011); Toccatas and fugues and Passacaille et Fugue en ut mineur by Bach; Recorded on 27 and 28 July 2009 in Saint-Louis-en-l'Île in Paris
- Camille Saint-Saëns: Danse macabre (arr. E. Lemare/V. Warnier), Cyprès et Lauriers, Symphony n° 3 "with organ" (Naxos Records, 2015): Orchestre national de Lyon, Leonard Slatkin (conductor); Recorded in November 2013 at the Orgue de l'Auditorium Maurice-Ravel in Lyon
