= Fagnon =

- Commune
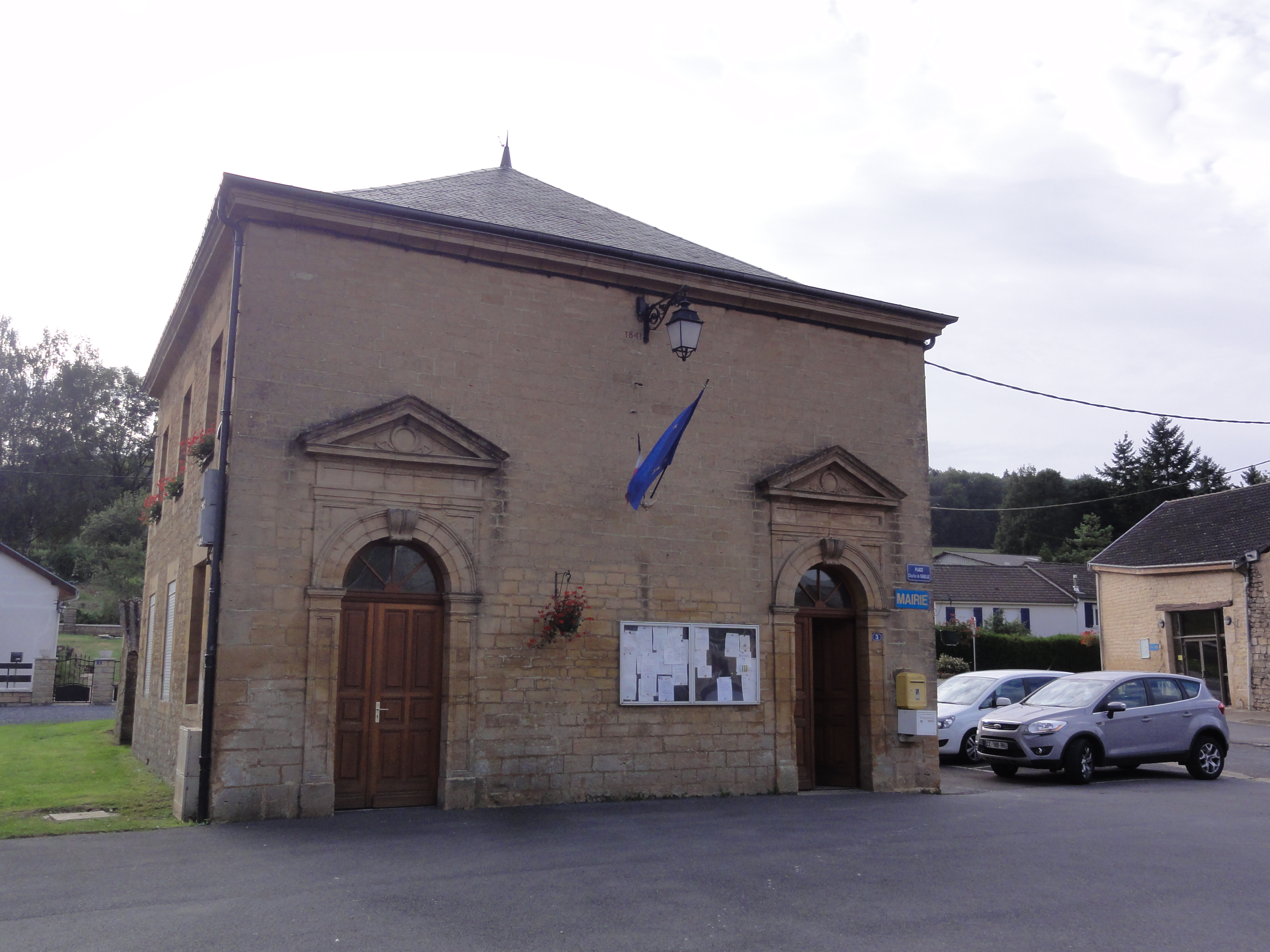
- The town hall in Fagnon

- Coat of arms
- Location of Fagnon
- Location within France Location within Grand Est
- Coordinates: 49°44′14″N 4°38′11″E
- Country: France
- Region: Grand Est
- Department: Ardennes
- Arrondissement: Charleville-Mézières
- Canton: Charleville-Mézières-1
- Intercommunality: Ardenne Métropole

Government
  - Mayor (2020–2026): Coralie Durand
- Area^{1}: 9.98 km^{2} (3.85 sq mi)
- Elevation: 173 m (568 ft)
- Population (2023): 339
  - Density: 34.0/km^{2} (88.0/sq mi)
- Time zone: UTC+01:00 (CET)
  - Summer (DST): UTC+02:00 (CEST)
- INSEE/Postal code: 08162 /08090
- ^{1} French Land Register data, which excludes lakes, ponds, glaciers > 1 km^{2} (0.386 sq mi or 247 acres) and river estuaries.

Fagnon (French pronunciation: [faɲɔ̃]) is a commune in the Ardennes department in the Grand Est region, northern France.

== Population ==
Historical population
Year	Pop.	±% p.a.
1968	189	—
1975	212	+1.65%
1982	282	+4.16%
1990	334	+2.14%
1999	345	+0.36%
2007	358	+0.46%
2012	335	−1.32%
2017	342	+0.41%
2023	339	−0.15%
Source: INSEE

== See also ==
- Communes of the Ardennes department
