= Monique Pelletier (politician) =

French judge and politician (1926–2025)

Member of the Constitutional Council
- In office 28 March 2000 – 8 March 2004
- Appointed by: Jacques Chirac
- Preceded by: Roland Dumas
- Succeeded by: Pierre Steinmetz

Minister Responsible for Women's Rights
- In office 12 September 1978 – 4 March 1981
- Preceded by: Françoise Giroud
- Succeeded by: Yvette Roudy

Personal details
- Born: Monique Denyse Bédier; 25 July 1926 Trouville-sur-Mer, France
- Died: 19 October 2025 (aged 99) Neuilly-sur-Seine, France
- Political party: UDF
- Education: Lycée Racine
- Occupation: Judge

Monique Pelletier (French: [mɔnik pɛltje]; 25 July 1926 – 19 October 2025) was a French judge and politician of the Union for French Democracy (UDF). She was a part of a generation of women in French politics in the later twentieth century, and advocated for women's rights throughout her career. She served on the Constitutional Council for four years, and was the third woman to serve on the council.

== Life and career ==
Born in Trouville-sur-Mer in Normandy on 25 July 1926, Pelletier studied at the Lycée Racine in Paris. She earned her law license and was admitted to the Paris Bar at the age of 19. From 1948 to 1960, she was an assessor in Seine, then in Nanterre from 1966 to 1975. From 1969 to 1974, she headed the women's committee for the Centre Democracy and Progress. In 1971, she was elected to the municipal council of Neuilly-sur-Seine and became deputy mayor in 1977. That year, she was tasked by President Valéry Giscard d'Estaing to draft a report on the drug problem in France, in which she urged the government to provide more support for drug addicts.

In 1978, Pelletier was named secretary of state to Minister of Justice Alain Peyrefitte. That September, she was named Minister Responsible for Women's Rights, succeeding Françoise Giroud. She endorsed the renewal of the Veil Act, which legalized abortion, in 1979 and the criminalization of rape in 1980. In January 1979, she had the Council of Ministers adopt "five measures in favor of women" to experiment with quotas for women on lists of candidates for elections. The proposal was passed by the National Assembly, but failed in the Senate due to a lack of support.

Alongside Françoise Giroud and Simone Veil, Pelletier was a key player among the new generation of women in French politics. She joined the UDF upon its formation in 1978, opposing the Republican Party figures such as Alain Madelin, François Léotard, and Charles Millon. During the 1981 presidential election, she campaigned for incumbent Valéry Giscard d'Estaing and was a spokeswoman his committees. After Giscard's defeat in the election and her defeat in the following legislative election, she returned to private practice with Ngo Cohen Amir-Aslani.

On 22 March 2000, Pelletier was nominated to the Constitutional Council by President Jacques Chirac, replacing Roland Dumas. The third woman to ever serve on the Council, she was succeeded by Pierre Steinmetz on 8 March 2004. After her retirement, she became involved in the rights of disabled people following a stroke suffered by her husband. In 2016, it was revealed that she had been sexually assaulted by a member of the Senate in 1979, who forcibly kissed her at the end of an interview.

Pelletier died at Neuilly-sur-Seine on 19 October 2025, at the age of 99.

== Publications ==
- Le Droit dans ma vie (1973)
- Mission d'études sur l'ensemble des problèmes de la drogue (Report, 1978)
- Nous sommes toutes responsables (1981)
- La Ligne brisée (1995)
- Le Soleil peut attendre (2011)
- Souvenirs irrespectueux d'une femme libre (2017)

== Decorations ==
- Grand Officer of the Ordre national du Mérite (2010)
- Grand Cross of the Legion of Honour (2021)
