= Mila Racine =

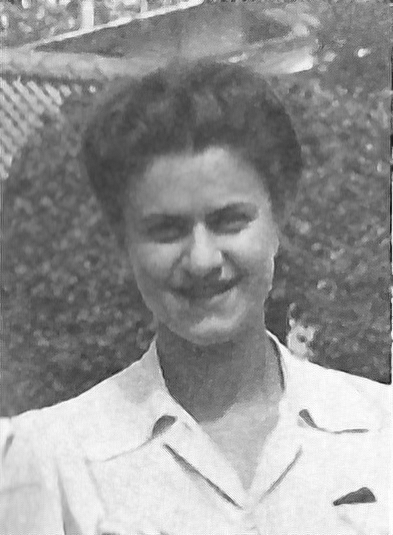
- Born: 14 September 1921; Moscow
- Died: 30 March 1945 (aged 23); Mauthausen Concentration Camp, Austria

Mila Racine (14 September 1921 - 30 March 1945) was a member of the French Jewish underground resistance network during World War II. She is best known for smuggling Jewish children out of France and into Switzerland.

In October of 1943, Racine was caught by the Gestapo. She was imprisoned at Ravensbruck and then Mauthausen where she was killed in an allied bombardment in March of 1945.

She was posthumously awarded the Medaille de la Resistance and the Croix de Guerre.

== Biography ==
Racine was born in Moscow to George-Hirsch and Bertha-Basha Racine. She had two siblings, Emmanuel and Sasha. The Racines moved to Paris in 1926. Upon the German invasion, they relocated to the South of France.

Racine was a member of the Women’s International Zionist Organization. She was recruited by Simon Lévitte of Eclaireurs Israelites de France (EIF) to work in a documentation center in Moissac. Lévitte relocated the document center to Grenoble when the Germans took control of southern France. Racine also moved to Grenoble and continued working in the document center which was run by EIF and the Zionist Youth Movement (MJS).

After the Germans took Grenoble, Racine, using the name Marie Anne Richemond, worked with a network of underground activists to smuggle Jewish children into Switzerland.

On 21 October 1943 Racine and her underground colleague Roland Epstein were arrested by German border police in Saint-Julien-en-Genevois while attempting to smuggle thirty children across the border. They were imprisoned along with the children at Pax Hotel in Annemasse which had been converted to a Gestapo jail. The Mayor of Annemasse secured the release of some of the children and offered to help Racine, but she declined his help due to concern for the remaining children.

Racine hid her Jewish identity and was imprisoned at Ravensbrück. She was later sent to Mauthausen where she was killed in an Allied bombardment in March of 1945.

Racine was posthumously awarded the Medaille de la Resistance and the Croix de Guerre.
