= Bar-le-Duc =

- Prefecture and commune
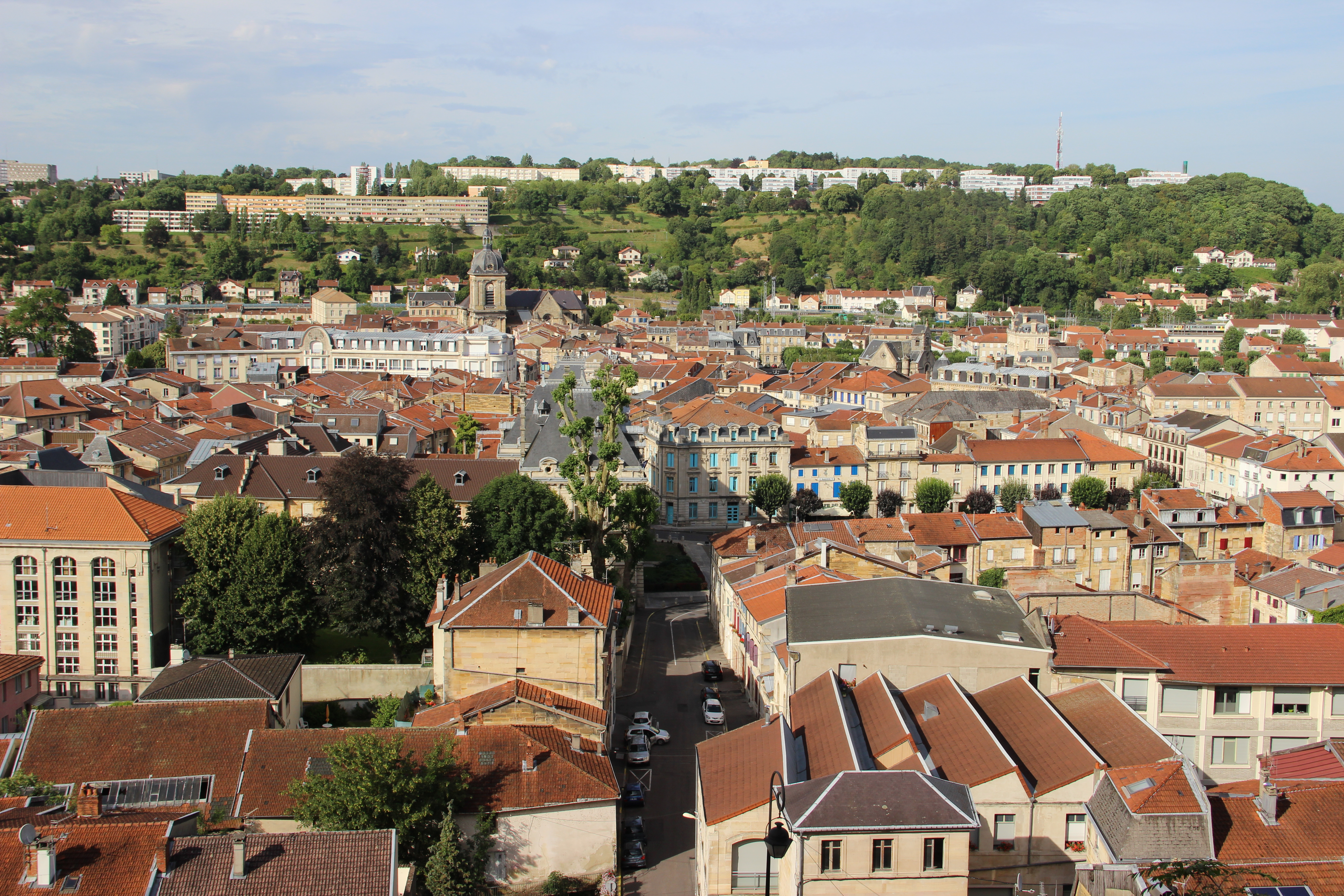

- Coat of arms
- Location of Bar-le-Duc
- Location within France Location within Grand Est
- Coordinates: 48°46′19″N 5°09′37″E
- Country: France
- Region: Grand Est
- Department: Meuse
- Arrondissement: Bar-le-Duc
- Canton: Bar-le-Duc-1 and 2
- Intercommunality: CA Bar-le-Duc - Sud Meuse

Government
  - Mayor (2020–2026): Martine Joly (UDI)
- Area^{1}: 23.62 km^{2} (9.12 sq mi)
- Elevation: 240 m (790 ft)
- Highest elevation: 327 m (1,073 ft)
- Lowest elevation: 175 m (574 ft)
- Population (2023): 14,607
  - Density: 618.4/km^{2} (1,602/sq mi)
- Time zone: UTC+01:00 (CET)
  - Summer (DST): UTC+02:00 (CEST)
- INSEE/Postal code: 55029 /55000
- ^{1} French Land Register data, which excludes lakes, ponds, glaciers > 1 km^{2} (0.386 sq mi or 247 acres) and river estuaries.

Bar-le-Duc (French pronunciation: [baʁ lə 'dyk]), formerly known as Bar, is a commune in the Meuse département, of which it is the capital. The department is in Grand Est in northeastern France.

The lower, more modern and busier part of the town extends along a narrow valley, shut in by wooded or vine-clad hills, and is traversed by the Ornain, which is crossed by several bridges. It is bordered on the north-east by the Marne–Rhine Canal and on the south-west by a small arm of the Ornain called the Canal des Usines, on the left bank of which the upper town (Ville Haute) is situated.

The highly rarefied Bar-le-duc jelly, also known as Lorraine jelly, is a spreadable preparation of white currant or red currant fruit preserves. First mentioned in the historical record in 1344, it is also colloquially referred to as "Bar caviar".

== History ==
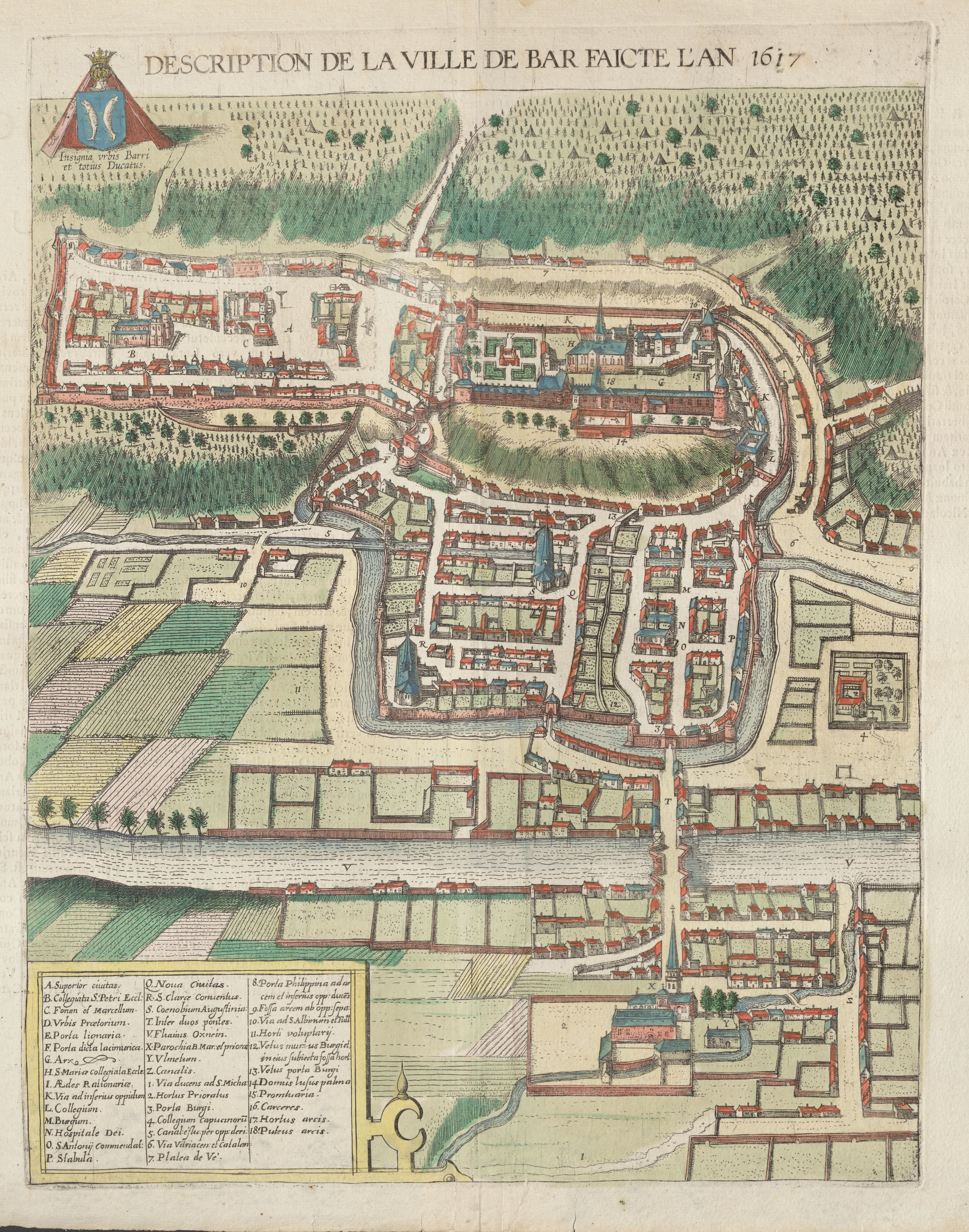
Bar-le-Duc in 1617

Bar-le-Duc was at one time the seat of the county, from 1354 the Duchy of Bar. Though probably of ancient origin, the town was unimportant until the 10th century when it was fortified by Frederick I of Upper Lorraine. Bar was an independent duchy from 1354 to 1480, when it was acquired by Duchy of Lorraine.

The Ville Haute, which is reached by steps and steep narrow thoroughfares, is intersected by a long, quiet street, bordered by houses of the 15th, 16th and 17th centuries. In this quarter are the remains (16th-century) of the château of the dukes of Bar, dismantled in 1670, the old clock-tower and the college, built in the latter half of the 16th century. The church of Saint-Étienne (constructed during the 14th and 15th centuries) contains the Cadaver Tomb of René of Chalon, a skilfully carved effigy in white stone of a half-decayed corpse. It was erected to the memory of René of Châlon (died 1544) and is the work of 16th-century artist Ligier Richier, a pupil of Michelangelo.

The lower town contains the official buildings and the churches of Notre-Dame, the most ancient in the town, and St Antony, with 14th-century frescoes. Among the statues of distinguished natives of the town is one of Nicolas Oudinot, whose house serves as the hôtel-de-ville. Other sights include Notre-Dame Bridge, with five arches surmounted by a chapel in the middle.

Bar-le-Duc served as the assembly point for essential supplies going to the besieged city of Verdun during the Battle of Verdun in 1916. Thousands of trucks, carrying men, equipment and food, travelled north, around the clock, on the road linking Bar-le-Duc to Verdun. The route was given the name Voie Sacrée (Sacred Way) by the writer and politician Maurice Barres in April 1916, a reference to the ancient Roman Sacra Via, leading to triumph.

== Population ==
Historical population

Year	Pop.	±% p.a.
1793	9,111	—
1800	8,961	−0.24%
1806	9,970	+1.79%
1821	11,432	+0.92%
1831	12,496	+0.89%
1836	12,383	−0.18%
1841	12,526	+0.23%
1846	13,191	+1.04%
1851	14,816	+2.35%
1856	13,835	−1.36%
1861	14,922	+1.52%
1866	15,334	+0.55%
1872	15,175	−0.17%

Year	Pop.	±% p.a.
1876	16,728	+2.47%
1881	17,485	+0.89%
1886	18,860	+1.53%
1891	18,761	−0.11%
1896	18,249	−0.55%
1901	17,693	−0.62%
1906	17,307	−0.44%
1911	17,068	−0.28%
1921	16,261	−0.48%
1926	16,365	+0.13%
1931	16,550	+0.23%
1936	16,697	+0.18%
1946	15,460	−0.77%

Year	Pop.	±% p.a.
1954	16,609	+0.90%
1962	18,346	+1.25%
1968	19,159	+0.73%
1975	19,288	+0.10%
1982	18,471	−0.62%
1990	17,545	−0.64%
1999	16,944	−0.39%
2007	16,002	−0.71%
2012	15,759	−0.31%
2017	14,985	−1.00%
2023	14,607	−0.42%

Source: EHESS and INSEE (1968-2023)

== Notable residents ==
Bar-le-Duc was the birthplace of:

- Jean de Lorraine (1498–1550), Cardinal de Lorraine, Bishop of Metz, Archbishop of Narbonne
- Mary of Guise (1515–1560), queen consort of Scotland and mother of Mary, Queen of Scots
- Francis, Duke of Guise (1519–1563), soldier and politician
- Louis Joblot (1645–1723), mathematician and microscopist
- Nicolas Oudinot (1767–1847), marshal of France
- Jean-Joseph Regnault-Warin (1773–1844), writer, pamphleteer
- Rémi Joseph Isidore Exelmans (1775–1852), marshal of France
- Pierre Michaux (1813–1883), inventor
- Edmond Laguerre (1834–1886), mathematician
- Albert Cim (1845–1924), novelist, literary critic and bibliographer
- Henri Poincaré (1854–1912), mathematician and physicist
- Job (1858–1931), illustrator
- Raymond Poincaré (1860–1934), statesman
- Pierre de Bréville (1861–1944), composer
- Lucien Poincaré (1862–1920), physicist
- Pierre Camonin (1903–2003), canon and organist
- Jean Dries (1905–1973), painter
- Michel Bernard (born 1958), writer and senior official
- Anaïs Delva (born 1986), singer and actress
- Benjamin Compaoré (born 1987), athlete

Other notable residents were:

- Jean-François Jacqueminot (1787–1865), who established a great silk factory
- Ernest Bradfer (1833–1882), who established a major iron works in the town.

== Gallery ==
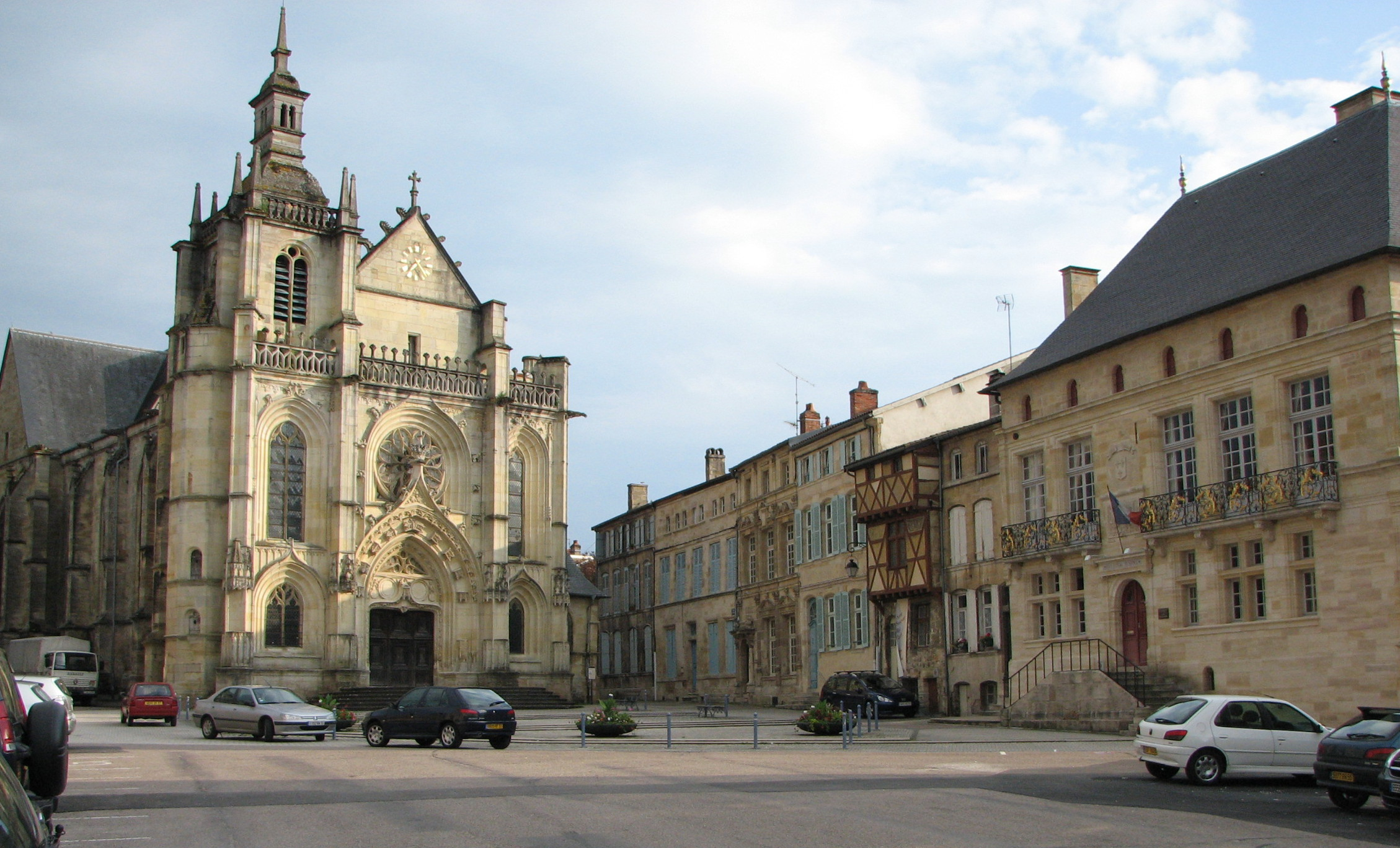
Saint-Étienne Church and the court house (right) on Saint-Pierre Square in Bar-le-Duc

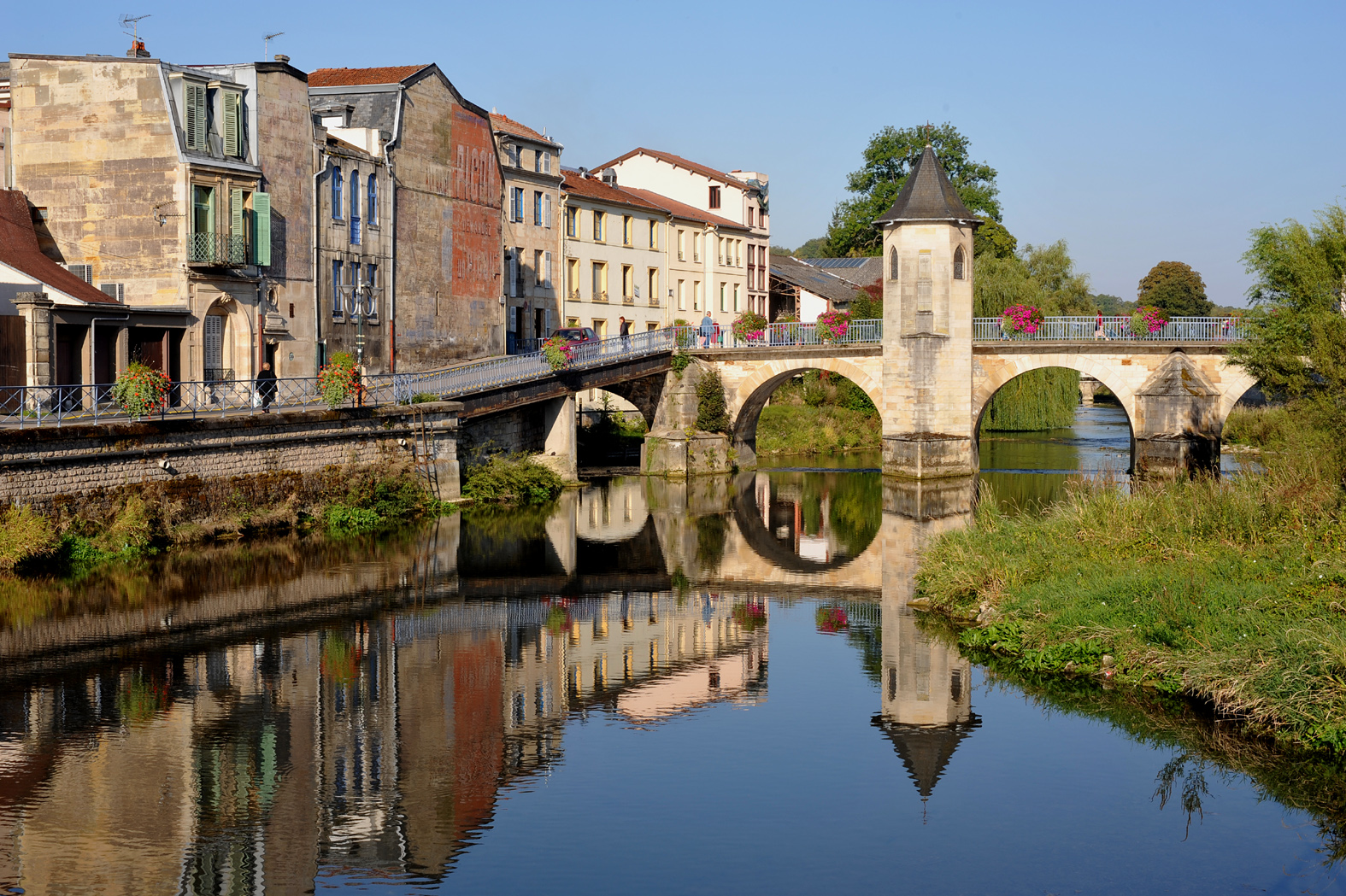
Notre-Dame Bridge over the Ornain

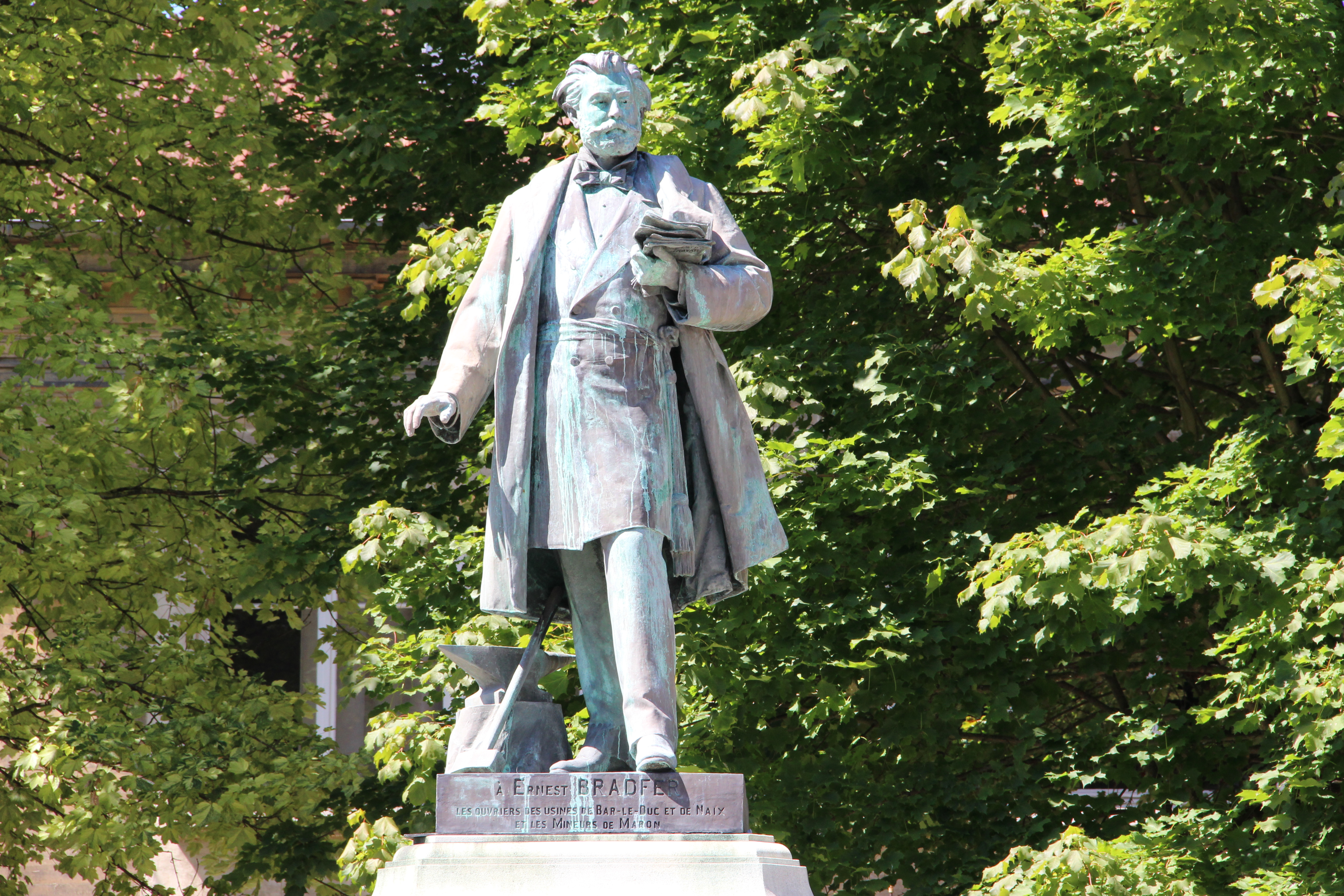
Statue of Ernest Bradfer (1833–1882)

== Twin cities ==
As of 2023 Bar-le-Duc is twinned with:

- Griesheim (Germany) since 1978
- Wilkau-Haßlau (Germany) since 1994
- Gyönk (Hungary) since 1995

Cultural exchanges are made throughout the year and the twinning committee also offers German lessons.

== See also ==
- Battle of Bar-le-Duc (1037)
- Communes of the Meuse department
- Parc naturel régional de Lorraine
- Raymond Couvègnes
